= Spiliotopoulos =

Spiliotopoulos (Greek: Σπηλιωτόπουλος) is a Greek surname. Notable people with the surname include:

- Aris Spiliotopoulos (born 1966), Greek politician
- Evan Spiliotopoulos, Greek-American screenwriter
- Panagiotis Spiliotopoulos (1891–1962), Greek army officer
- Spilios Spiliotopoulos (born 1941), Greek politician
