= Vangelis Meimarakis =

Greek politician

- Βαγγέλης Μεϊμαράκης
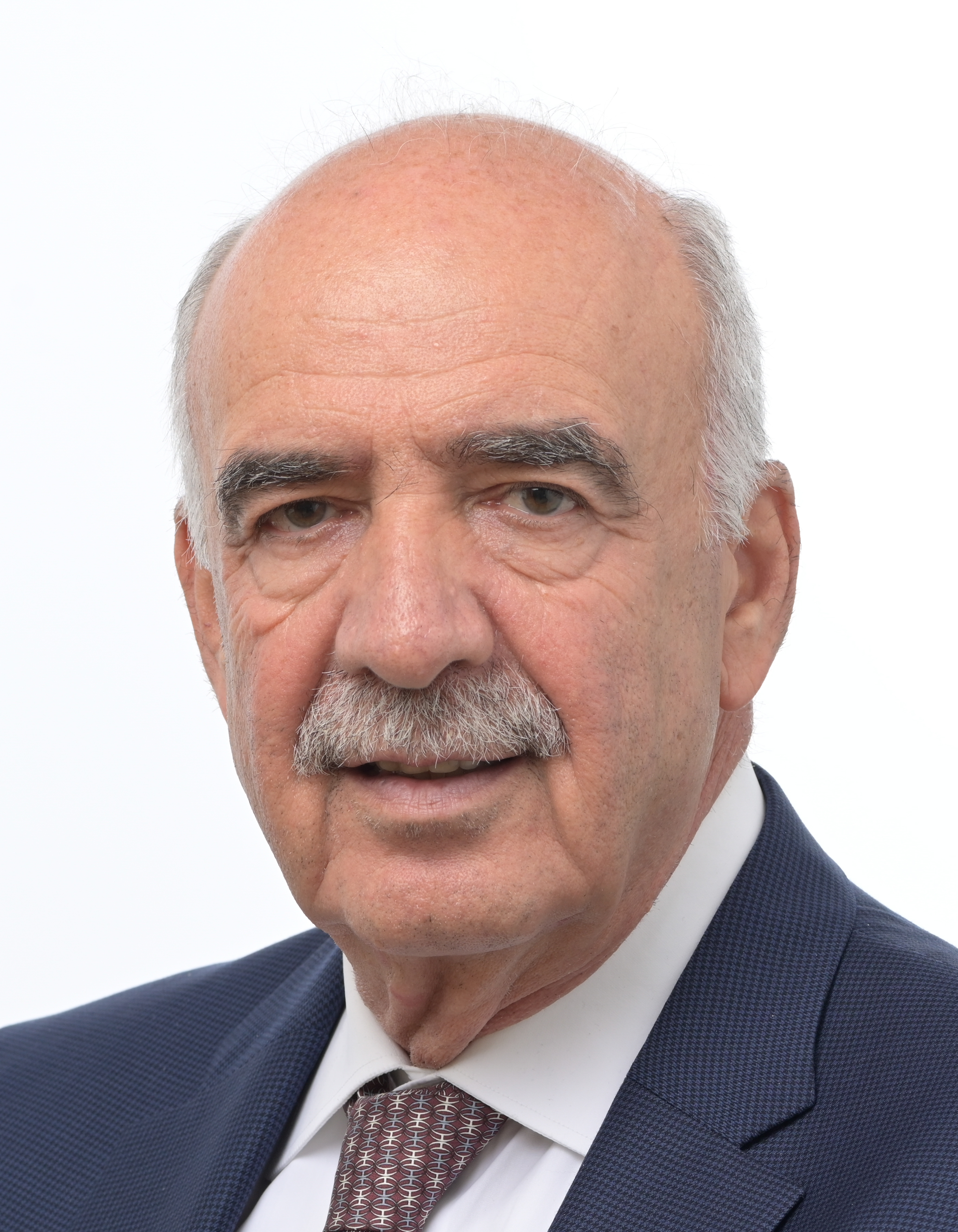
- Official portrait, 2024

Leader of the Opposition
- In office 21 September 2015 – 24 November 2015
- Prime Minister: Alexis Tsipras
- Preceded by: Himself (August 2015)
- Succeeded by: Giannis Plakiotakis
- In office 5 July 2015 – 27 August 2015
- Prime Minister: Alexis Tsipras
- Preceded by: Antonis Samaras
- Succeeded by: Himself (September 2015)

Interim President of New Democracy
- In office 5 July 2015 – 24 November 2015
- Deputy: Stavros Dimas; Dimitris Avramopoulos
- Preceded by: Antonis Samaras
- Succeeded by: Giannis Plakiotakis (interim)

10th Speaker of the Hellenic Parliament
- In office 29 June 2012 – 6 February 2015
- President: Karolos Papoulias
- Preceded by: Vyron Polydoras
- Succeeded by: Zoi Konstantopoulou

Minister for National Defence
- In office 15 February 2006 – 7 October 2009
- Prime Minister: Kostas Karamanlis
- Preceded by: Spilios Spiliotopoulos
- Succeeded by: Evangelos Venizelos
Parliamentary offices
Member of the Hellenic Parliament
In office 18 June 1989 – 25 April 2019
Constituency	Athens B
Member of the European Parliament
Incumbent
Assumed office 2 July 2019
Constituency	Greece

Personal details
- Born: 14 December 1953 (age 72) Athens, Kingdom of Greece
- Party: New Democracy
- Spouse: Ioanna Kolokota
- Children: 2
- Education: University of Athens; Panteion University
- Profession: Politician; Lawyer

Evangelos-Vasileios "Vangelis" Meimarakis (Greek: Ευάγγελος-Βασίλειος "Βαγγέλης" Μεϊμαράκης, pronounced [eˈvaɲɟelos vaˈsili.os vaɲˈɟelis mei̯maˈracis]; born 14 December 1953) is a Greek politician who served as the acting President of New Democracy and Leader of the Opposition in Greece from 5 July to 24 November 2015, competing as the challenger to Prime Minister Alexis Tsipras in the September 2015 Greek legislative election. He lost in the run-off of the New Democracy leadership election, 2015–16. Since 2019, he has been a Member of the European Parliament.

Meimarakis previously served as the Speaker of the Hellenic Parliament from 2012 to 2014 and as Minister for National Defence from 2006 to 2009. He was a Member of the Hellenic Parliament for Athens B from 1989 until 2019.

== Early life and education ==
Meimarakis was born in Athens and is of Cretan descent. His father was a Member of the Hellenic Parliament with ERE representing Heraklion.

Meimarakis joined New Democracy in 1974 as a student at Panteion University. That year, he helped found the Youth Organisation of New Democracy (ONNED).

== Political career ==
=== Early political career ===
Meimarakis was appointed chairman of the ONNED Executive Committee in 1984, and led the organisation to its 1st Conference in March 1987. He has been a member of the New Democracy Central Committee since the 2nd Party Conference in 1986.

He was first elected as a New Democracy Member of the Hellenic Parliament representing Athens B in the general elections of 1989 (June and November). He has since been reelected in 1990, 1993, 1996 and 2000.

Meimarakis was one of New Democracy's parliamentary representatives from 1991 to 1992. He served as Deputy Minister for Sports from 1992 to 1993. In March 2001, at New Democracy's 5th Conference, he was elected as Secretary of the Central Committee, the first person to hold this role. He was reelected as Secretary in July 2004, and remained in this role until 15 February 2006, when he was appointed as the Minister for National Defense in the First Cabinet of Kostas Karamanlis.

=== Speaker of the Hellenic Parliament (2012–2015) ===
On 29 June 2012, he became Speaker of the Hellenic Parliament, a position he held until the next Parliament was elected in January 2015.

=== Leader of the New Democracy (2015) ===
In July 2015, Antonis Samaras resigned as leader of New Democracy following the 'No' vote in the bailout referendum. Meimarakis took over from Samaras as an interim leader. In this capacity he led the party into the snap election on 20 September 2015, at which New Democracy were defeated for a second time in nine months by SYRIZA. Meimarakis did however succeed in slightly increasing the ND vote share from 27.8% to 28.1%. Despite this, their seat tally dropped from 76 to 75.

Meimarakis continued as interim leader following the September election, announcing that a New Democracy leadership election would take place before the end of the year and that he would be a candidate. On 24 November, Meimarakis appointed the secretary of the New Democracy parliamentary group, Giannis Plakiotakis, as a vice president of the party, before resigning and therefore making Plakiotakis the new interim leader.

=== Member of the European Parliament (2019–present) ===
Meimarakis has been a Member of the European Parliament since the 2019 European elections. He has since been serving on the Committee on Foreign Affairs and its Subcommittee on Security and Defence. Since 2021, he has been part of the Parliament's delegation to the Conference on the Future of Europe.

Within the centre-right European People's Party Group (EPP), Meimarakis is one of the deputies of chairman Manfred Weber.

== Personal life ==
Meimarakis is married to Ioanna Kolokota, the daughter of Greek actress Nitsa Marouda, and they have two daughters. He is fluent in English.

Meimarakis is seen as down-to-earth, with Vassilis Monastiriotis of the London School of Economics commenting that he appeals to: "a broad cross-section: both working-class voters, who see him as a man of the people, and the traditional higher-income New Democracy supporters, who see him as a cunning operator able to hit Tsipras below the belt".

Political offices
Preceded by Spilios Spiliotopoulos	Minister for National Defence; 2006–2009	Succeeded by Evangelos Venizelos
Preceded by Vyron Polydoras	Speaker of the Hellenic Parliament; 2012–2015	Succeeded by Zoe Konstantopoulou
Preceded by Antonis Samaras	Leader of the Opposition; 2015	Succeeded by Giannis Plakiotakis
Party political offices
Preceded by Antonis Samaras	President of New Democracy; Acting; 2015	Succeeded by Giannis Plakiotakis; Acting
Order of precedence
Preceded by Vyron Polydoras as Former Speaker	Order of precedence of Greece; Former Speaker	Succeeded by Nikos Voutsis as Former Speaker
