= 2009 New Democracy leadership election =

| ← 1997 | 29 November 2009 | 2015–16 → |
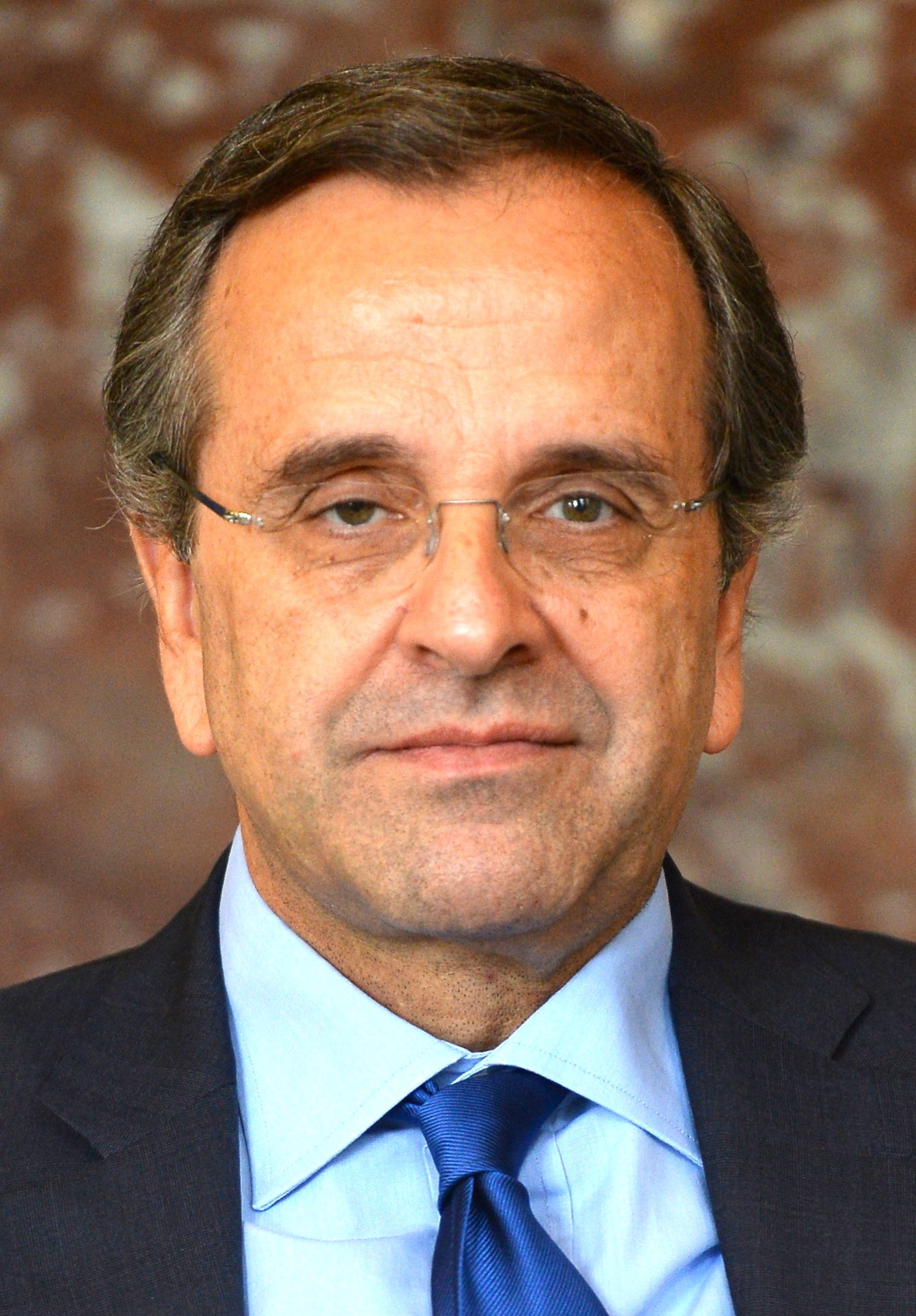

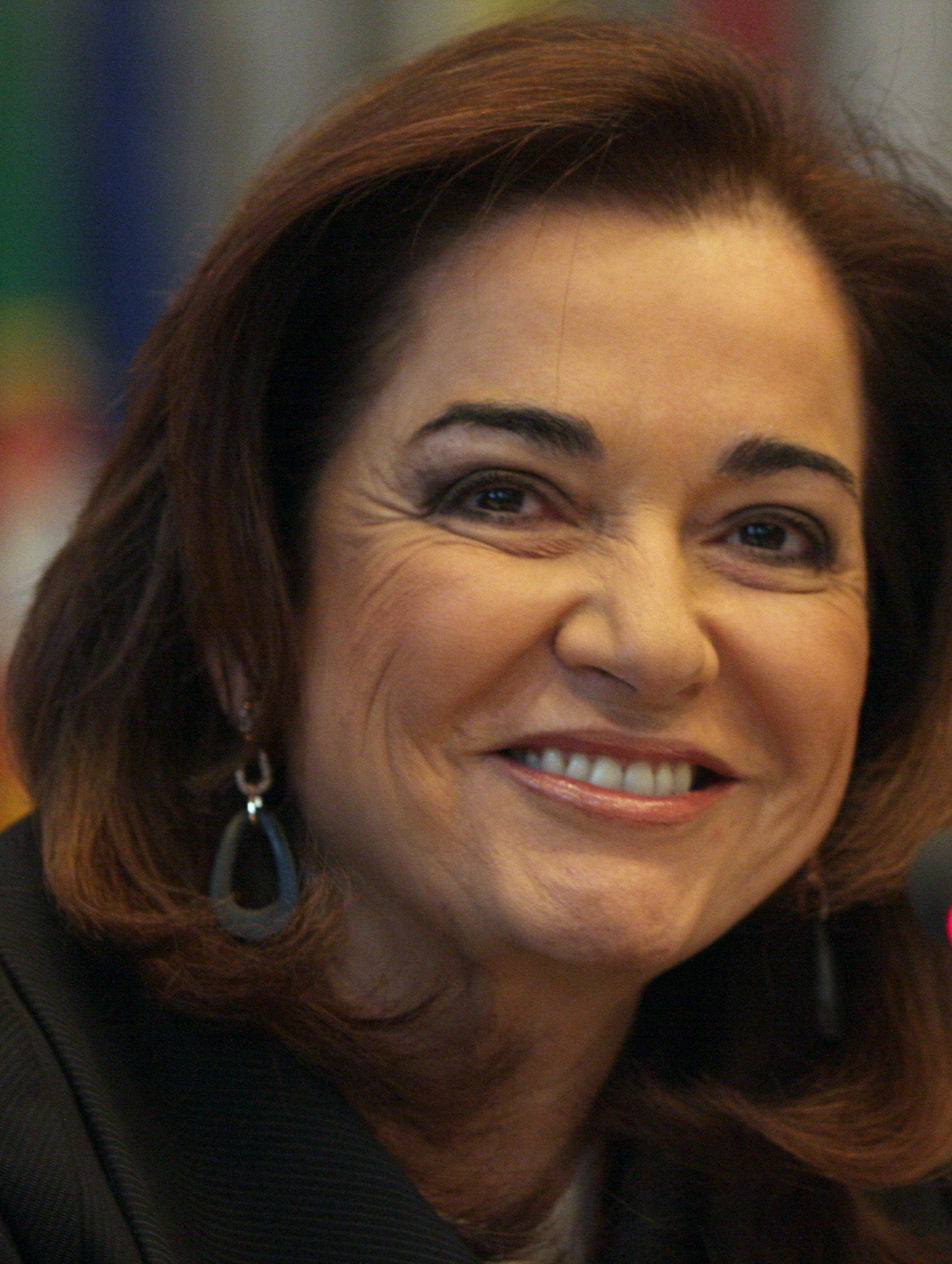
| Candidate | Antonis Samaras | Dora Bakoyannis |
| 1st round | 386,400; 50.06% | 306,625; 39.72% |
President of ND before election
Kostas Karamanlis
Elected President of ND
Antonis Samaras

The 2009 New Democracy leadership election was held on 29 November 2009, following the official announcement of the resignation of Kostas Karamanlis, after more than 12 years (since 21 March 1997) as leader of New Democracy, the main centre-right political party and one of the two major parties in Greece (at that time, the other of the two major parties was PASOK, the social democratic and center-left political party).

Karamanlis announced that he would start procedures for the election of a new president on 4 October 2009, after the defeat of majority party New Democracy in the 2009 Greek legislative election, which was held on the same day. Antonis Samaras succeeded Karamanlis as the party's leader having won 50.06 percent of the votes at first round: for this reason, no second round was required and Samaras took office on 30 November 2009 as ND party President and Leader of Opposition (against PASOK and George Papandreou's cabinet).

== Results ==
The results of the election.

| Candidate | Main political office | Votes | % |
|---|---|---|---|
| Antonis Samaras | Minister for Culture and Sport from 8 January 2009 to 6 October 2009 in the second cabinet of Kostas Karamanlis | 386,400 | 50.06 |
| Dora Bakoyannis | elected Mayor of Athens in October 2002 local election, she took office from 1 January 2003 to 14 February 2006, first female Mayor of Athens. | 306,625 | 39.72 |
| Panagiotis Psomiadis | MP elected in 1990, 1993, 1996, 2000 general election and Businessman elected Prefect of Salonicco in October 2002 and October 2006 local election | 78,870 | 10.22 |
| Total | 771,895 | 100.00 | |
| Valid votes | 771,895 | 98.69 | |
| Invalid ballots | 10,241 | 1.31 | |
| Votes cast / turnout | 782,136 | 100.00 | |

== Background ==
In March 2004, New Democracy formed a cabinet for a first time under Kostas Karamanlis after their win in the 2004 Greek legislative election and received a fresh mandate for a second term in the untimely 2007 election. On September 2, 2009, Karamanlis called early general elections for a second time during his incumbency as Prime Minister of Greece, stressing the need for economic reform to tackle the impact of the 2008 financial crisis on the economy of Greece. He also blamed main opposition PASOK for these early polls, accusing them of creating a protracted pre-election climate until next March when the members of the Hellenic Parliament were to vote for the election of the President of Greece, as PASOK had proclaimed their intention to vote against incumbent Karolos Papoulias (member of PASOK, elected in March 2005) in order to force the government to call early general election, in a period when opinion polls had been giving a victory for PASOK by a large margin.
