= 2015–16 New Democracy leadership election =

New Democracy leadership election, 2015–16
- 20 December 2015– 10 January 2016
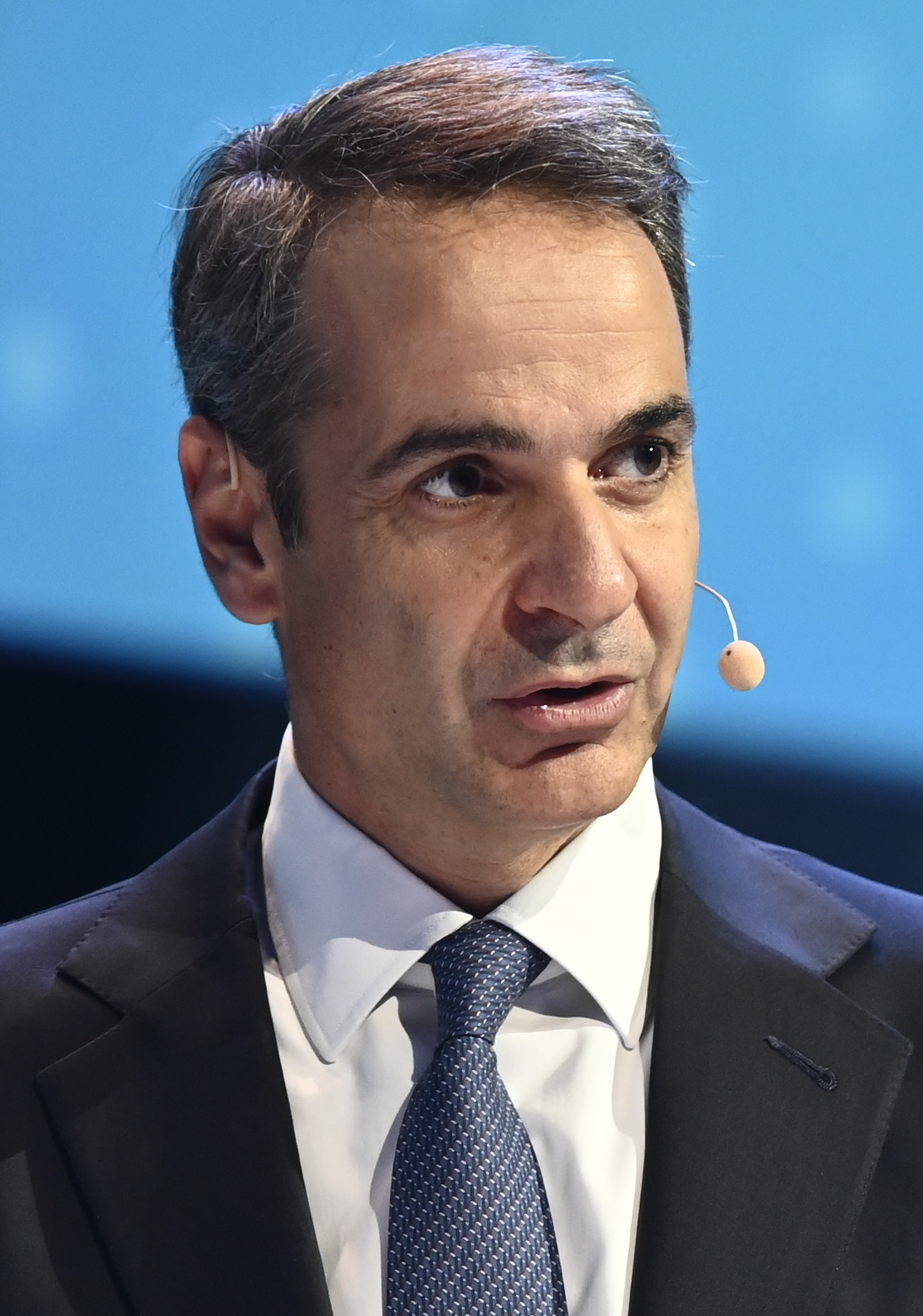

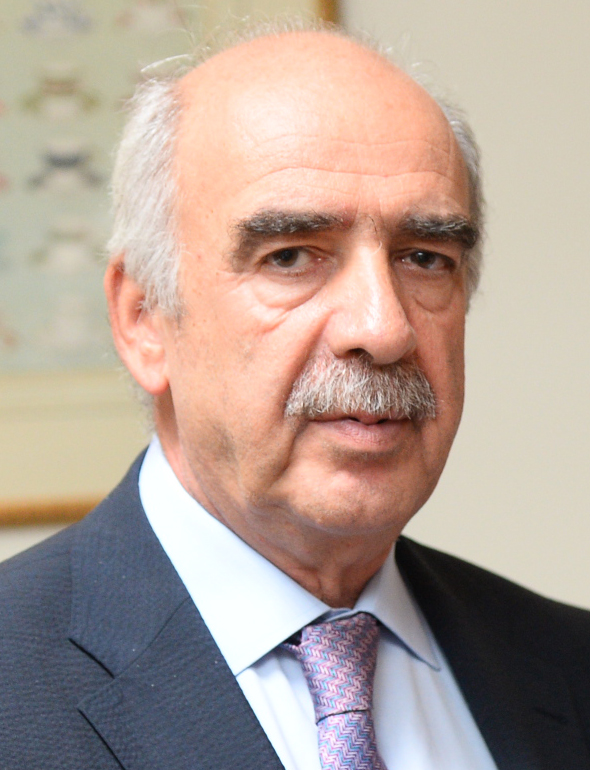

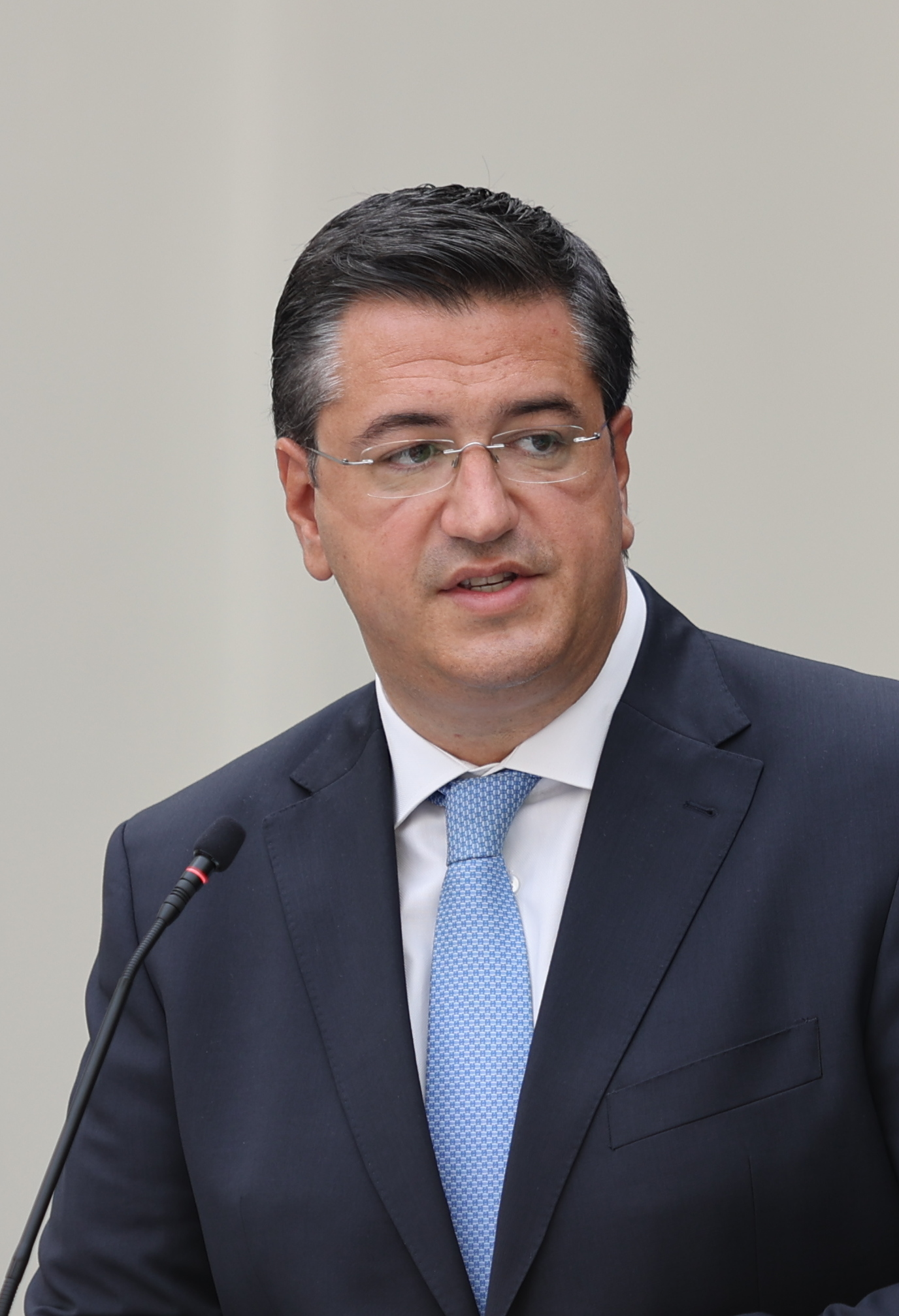

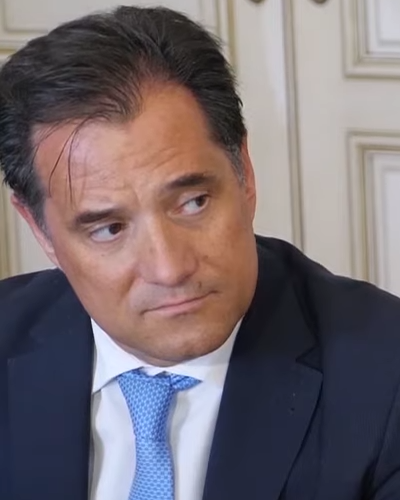
Candidate	Kyriakos Mitsotakis	Vangelis Meimarakis
Party	ND	ND
Popular vote	115,162 (1st round); 173,297 (2nd round)	160,823 (1st round); 157,224 (2nd round)
Percentage	28.5% (1st round); 52.4% (2nd round)	39.8% (1st round); 47.6% (2nd round)
Candidate	Apostolos Tzitzikostas	Adonis Georgiadis
Party	ND	ND
Popular vote	82,028 (1st round)	46,065 (1st round)
Percentage	20,3% (1st round)	11.4% (1st round)
President of ND before election
Ioannis Plakiotakis (acting)
Elected President of ND
Kyriakos Mitsotakis

The 2015–16 New Democracy leadership election refers to the two-round election to determine the next president of New Democracy, after the resignation of Antonis Samaras on 5 July 2015. The first round was held on 20 December 2015 and the second round was held on 10 January 2016. Kyriakos Mitsotakis was elected as the new president.

== Procedure ==
Whilst the election had originally been expected to be held on 30 August 2015, 57 MPs called for interim leader Vangelis Meimarakis to stay on until spring 2016, postponing the leadership election. However, following ND's election loss in the early September 2015 elections, leadership elections were planned to be held before year's end.

The central electoral committee of the party met on 24 September at the request of interim leader Vangelis Meimarakis, to begin the electoral process. They set out a timetable as follows:

- 1 October - end of candidate registration period
- 4 October - end of objection period
- 5 October - final approved list of candidates

=== Technical issues ===
On 21 November, when testing the electronic voting system, the Central Electoral Committee found a number of issues, which meant that the election could not start at the scheduled time of 07:00 on 22 November. Furthermore, another issue arose on the evening of the 22 that caused the Central Electoral Committee to replace 50 electoral delegates. They then took a unanimous decision to postpone the election.

Mitsotakis issued a statement saying: "We owe a big apology to all the New Democracy supporters, and also to all Greek citizens. Unfortunately the election process can no longer take place today. This is no time to be seeking who is responsible. The time for that will come later." Meimarakis threatened to withdraw his candidacy if the election was not postponed, and Georgiadis called the failure a "fiasco" and asked for the resignation of all the members of the Central Electoral Committee.

Both Mitsotakis and Tzitzikostas called for Meimarakis to step down as interim leader and appoint a new interim leader. On 24 November, Meimarakis appointed Ioannis Plakiotakis, the secretary of the parliamentary group, as a Vice President of New Democracy. Later that day, Meimarakis resigned as the interim President, appointing Plakiotakis as the new interim President.

== Candidates ==
Candidate	Image	Constituency	Office	Source
Adonis Georgiadis		Athens B	Minister of Health (2013–2014)	
Vangelis Meimarakis		Athens B	Speaker of the Hellenic Parliament (2012–2015)	
Kyriakos Mitsotakis		Athens B	Minister of Administrative Reform and e-Governance (2013–2015)	
Apostolos Tzitzikostas		None	Regional Governor of Central Macedonia (2013–2024)	

=== Declined ===
- Dimitris Avramopoulos, Vice President of New Democracy, European Commissioner for Migration, Home Affairs and Citizenship, former Minister for National Defence, former Minister for Foreign Affairs, former Minister of Health and Social Security, former Minister of Tourism, former Mayor of Athens
- Dora Bakoyannis, former Minister for Foreign Affairs, former Mayor of Athens, former Minister of Culture
- Nikos Dendias, former Minister for National Defence, former Minister of Development and Competitiveness, former Minister of Public Order and Citizen Protection, former Minister of Justice
- Kostas Karamanlis, former Prime Minister of Greece, former President of New Democracy, former Minister of Culture, former Leader of the Opposition
- Olga Kefalogianni, former Minister of Tourism
- Vassilis Kikilias, former Minister of Public Order and Citizen Protection
- Makis Voridis, former Minister of Health, former Minister of Infrastructure, Transport and Networks

== Results ==
The results of the election. In the first round only the valid votes were announced.

Candidate	First election 20 December 2015		Second election 10 January 2016	
Candidate	Votes	%	Votes	%
Kyriakos Mitsotakis	115,162	28.50	173,297	52.43
Vangelis Meimarakis	160,823	39.80	157,224	47.57
Apostolos Tzitzikostas	82,028	20.30		
Adonis Georgiadis	46,065	11.40		
Total	404,078	100.00	330,521	100.00
Valid votes	404,078	—	330,521	98.74
Invalid ballots	—	—	3,077	0.92
Blank ballots	—	—	1,154	0.34
Votes cast / turnout	—	—	334,752	100.00
