= Panos Panagiotopoulos =

Greek politician (born 1957)

Panos Panagiotopoulos Πάνος Παναγιωτόπουλος
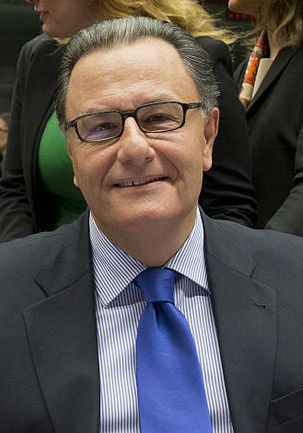

Minister for Culture and Sport
- In office 25 June 2013 – 10 June 2014
- Prime Minister: Antonis Samaras
- Preceded by: Konstantinos Arvanitopoulos (Education, Religious Affairs, Culture and Sport)
- Succeeded by: Konstantinos Tasoulas

Minister for National Defence
- In office 21 June 2012 – 25 June 2013
- Prime Minister: Antonis Samaras
- Preceded by: Frangoulis Frangos
- Succeeded by: Dimitris Avramopoulos

Minister for Employment and Social Protection
- In office 10 March 2004 – 15 February 2006
- Prime Minister: Kostas Karamanlis
- Preceded by: Dimitris Reppas
- Succeeded by: Savvas Tsitouridis

Personal details
- Born: 11 December 1957 (age 68) Athens, Greece
- Party: New Democracy
- Spouse: Maouzi Tsaldari
- Children: 1
- Education: University of Athens; Paris 8 University

Panos Panagiotopoulos (Greek: Πάνος Παναγιωτόπουλος; born 11 December 1957) is a Greek politician of the New Democracy party.

Panagiotopoulos was a Member of the European Parliament (MEP) from 1999 to 2009. He was the spokesman for the Hellenic Government (2007) as well as for New Democracy party (November 2009 – January 2011). He also served as the Minister of Employment and Social Protection in Kostas Karamanlis's 2004 cabinet. He has served as Minister for Culture and Sport from June 2013 to June 2014 and as Minister for Defence from June 2012 to June 2013.

== Biography ==
Panagiotopoulos was born in Athens in 1957. He originated from Arcadia and Evrytania. He served his military service in the Hellenic Air Force from 1978 to 1980. He studied civil engineering in National Technical University of Athens and law in National and Kapodistrian University of Athens as well as in University of Vincennes in Saint-Denis. He is also a graduate of the French Institute of Athens. He currently resides in Athens. He is fluent in English and French.He was married to Maouzi Tsaldari and he has a son.

Political offices
Preceded by Frangoulis Frangos	Minister for National Defence; 2012–2013	Succeeded by Dimitris Avramopoulos
