= Eugenia Manolidou =

Greek musician

- Born: Eugenia Karagiannidou; Athens, Greece
- Other name: Eugenia Manolides
- Occupations: Composer and conductor

Eugenia Karagiannidou (Greek: Ευγενία Καραγιαννίδου; born in Athens, Greece), better known as Eugenia Manolidou (Μανωλίδου) or Manolides, is a Greek classical composer, conductor and is married to politician and Minister for Health of Greece Adonis Georgiadis.

== Biography ==
Eugenia Karagiannidou was born in Athens, Greece. Eugenia married painter Theodore Manolides, in 1995. They separated in 2002 but Theodore denied filing the divorce for quite a while. Afterward she lived with the editor, New Democracy party Vice President and former Minister Adonis Georgiades. She has given birth to 4 children, 2 of which with Theodore (Alexandros, 1996 and Olympia Theodora, 1998) and 2 with Adonis, called Perseus (2005) and Alcaeus (2014). Eventually Eugenia and Adonis got married on June 22, 2009.

== Education and career as conductor ==
Eugenia Manolidou started piano lessons at the age of 5 and she kept practising all along, though her goal has always been composing. During her childhood, her father died. At some point, she paused her piano studies in Conservatory J.S. Bach, with Russian teacher Alla Halapsis. After graduation from high school, she began to study management but soon enough she pursued her dream overseas. In New York she managed to get accepted into the Juilliard School. She studied composition and orchestration with composer Daron Hagen as well as orchestral conducting with the founder of the New York Grand Opera Company, Vincent La Selva. At the same time, she resumed advanced piano studies with soloist Julie Jordan. Four years later, in 1998, she returned to Europe for postgraduate studies with Belgian composer and conductor Robert Janssens at the Royal Conservatory of Brussels. She previously stated in her CV that in 2005 she obtained a master's degree in the History of Civilization from the Alpine Universität in Zurich, an institution whose existence has been called into question.

== TV presenter ==
In 2008 she began presenting the TV show "Moment of Truth", in which contestants were called to answer in public to questions about private matters, the sincerity of their answers being checked with the use of a lie detector and the money prize increasing as they advanced in the game. The show met with great success, but caused intense controversy and was characterized by part of the press as a typicl case of "trash TV". The next year the National Council for Radio and Television decided that the show would be permanently cancelled, holding that, despite the sanctions and fines that had been repeatedly imposed, its content hadn't changed. According to the Council's rationale, the show, using the money prize as an enticement, was pushing contestants to reveal private personal data, resulting to their personality's degradation.

She was a constestant in the first season of Greek TV series Dancing with the Stars, finishing third, and returned to the show a guest judge in its fourth season.

== Classical Education Work ==
Since 2016, Eugenia Manolidou has devoted her career to the promotion of Ancient Greek, particularly for younger audiences. As Director of Elliniki Agogi, a pioneering educational institution founded in 1994, she leads programs that make Ancient Greek accessible and engaging for children aged 3 to 16.

Her educational approach emphasizes experiential learning, combining ancient texts with music, theater, storytelling, and modern teaching methods, as described in the official educational philosophy of Elliniki Agogi.

Manolidou has authored several educational books aimed at introducing Ancient Greek language and culture to children, including:

- Μανθάνω καὶ Γράφω τὰ γράμματα τοῦ ἀλφαβήτου,
- Γράφω, Σβεννύω καὶ Μανθάνω λέξεις,
- and the historical series Ιχνηλάτες της Ιστορίας (Volumes 1 and 2),

all published by Ellinoekdotiki.

She contributed to the development of the first global certification in Classical Greek, in collaboration with PeopleCert. She regularly presents her work at international conferences, such as Jornadas de Cultura Clásica in Spain, and organizes the annual Delphi Classics symposium during the Delphi Economic Forum, which brings together international scholars and educators in Classical Studies.

In November 2024, she participated as a speaker at the inaugural World Conference of the Classics in Beijing, representing Elliniki Agogi’s initiatives in Classical education at a global level.

Manolidou has published academic articles in the Journal of Classics Teaching (Cambridge University Press), such as:

- "Ancient Greek for Kids: From Theory to Praxis" (2022),
- and "In Greek We Trust! Παίζοντες Μανθάνομεν" (2023).

Her work has been featured in major media outlets, including:

- Kathimerini,
- To Vima,
- CNN Greece,
- China Daily,
- and El Español.

She has been criticized for propagating the pseudoscientific view that "Ancient Greek has a mathematical structure" and for using fabricated quotes in her speeches, as well as for inaccurately presenting social media posts advertising Elliniki Agogi as being written in Ancient Greek.

== Discography ==
- 1999 – Meanings and Symbols: Eugenia's first attempt to express her musical perception of 14 meaningful and symbolic myths of ancient Greece, “an infinite source of inspiration”, as the composer has often stated since. Primarily recorded in New York in 1998, her last year as a student in the Juilliard School, where she conducted a chamber music ensemble under the supervision of her professor Daron Hagen. A later recording in May 1999 with Bulgarian Symphony Orchestra SIF 309 was released in Greece from Kunduru Music/Universal. This album is not available anymore.
- 2001 – Greek Hymns: Eugenia's second album presents a musical interpretation of 10 of the Orphic hymns. Recorded in Czech Republic with Filharmonie Bohuslava Martinů, soprano Hara Kefala, tenor Konstantinos Paliatsaras and choir. It was released in Greece by Als SA. It is no longer available.
- 2004 – Archetypon (i.e. Original Model): Featuring Manolides' first symphony Mythical Couples plus 2 compositions of hers dedicated to her country and Alexander the Great. Mythical Couples is in fact a symphonic poem in 4 movements and was recorded back in October 1998 with Bulgarian Symphony Orchestra SIF 309. Both Hymn to Greece and Hymn to Alexander were recorded with Czech Filharmonie Bohuslava Martinů, soprano Hara Kefala and bass-baritone Tassos Apostolou.
- 2004 – Gaia (i.e. Earth): Music of ballet in 2 acts Gaia which was recorded in September 1999 with Bulgarian Symphony Orchestra SIF 309 and staged the same year in Wuppertal.
- 2007 – Epos (i.e. Logos): Epos technically is a lyric drama in 3 acts for full symphony orchestra, soloists, choir and narrator. It was recorded in 2005 in Athens with members of Athens State Orchestra, soprano Hara Kefala, tenor Konstantinos Paliatsaras, bass-baritone Tassos Apostolou, alto Nona Voudouri, baritone Theodoros Efstratiades, narrator George Spanopoulos and Polymnia vocalis as chorus. Ioannis Ganassos assisted Eugenia Manolidou in writing the lyrics.
- 2003 to 2009 – Hercules: The real face of the great hero, Alexander the Great: The living legend, Iliad-Odyssey: A series of educational recordings for children with her husband depicting Greek history and mythology as fairytales with the use of music, narration and sound effects.
