= Minister for National Defence (Greece) =

Greek government minister

- Υπουργός Εθνικής Άμυνας
- Coat of arms of the Hellenic Republic

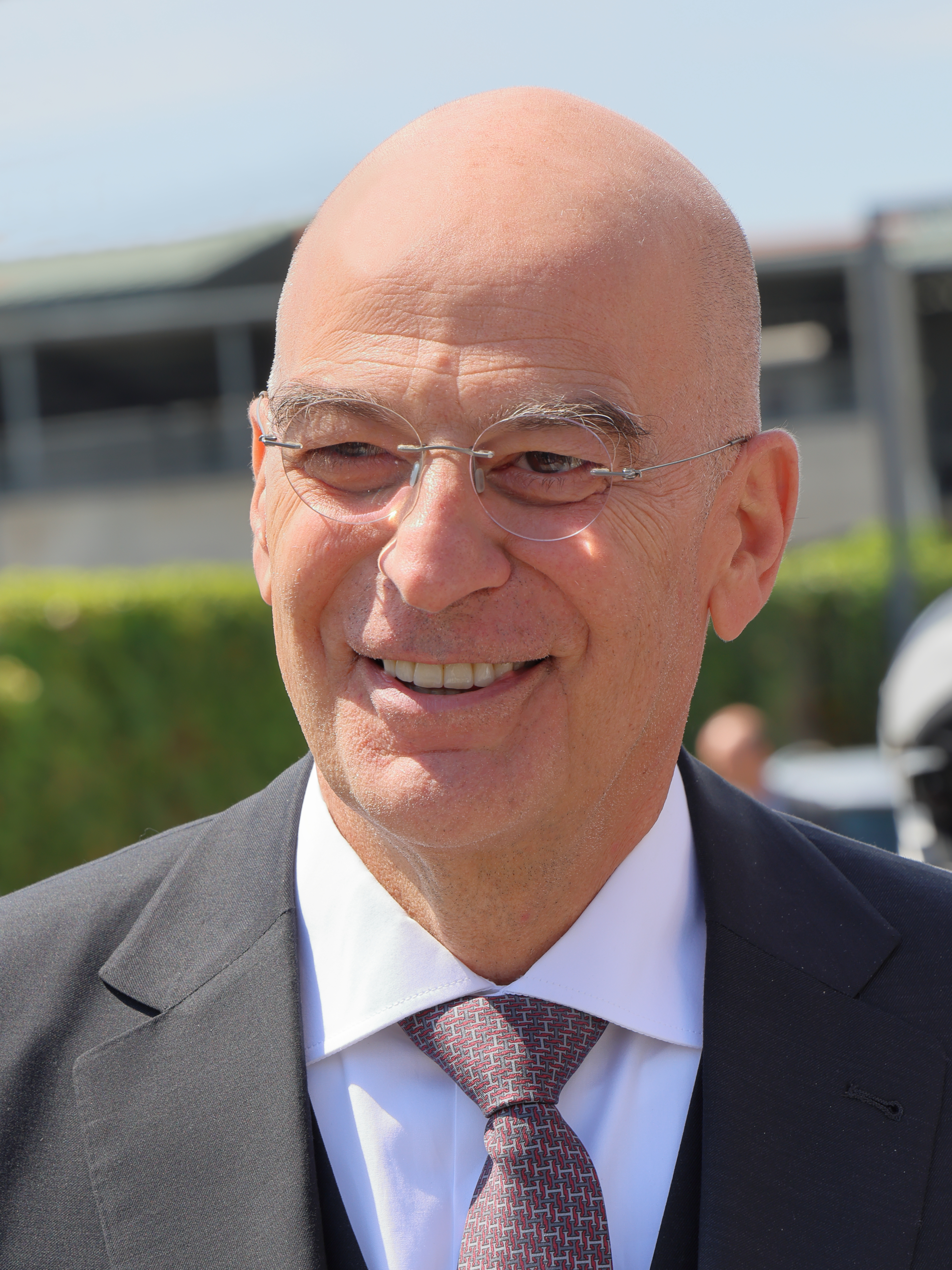
- Incumbent; Nikos Dendias since 27 June 2023
- Appointer: Prime Minister of Greece
- Inaugural holder: Konstantinos Koumoundouros
- Formation: 1899

The Minister for National Defence of Greece (Greek: Υπουργός Εθνικής Άμυνας, romanized: Ypourgós Ethnikī́s Ámynas) is a government minister responsible for the running of the Ministry of National Defence. The current minister is Nikos Dendias in the Second Cabinet of Kyriakos Mitsotakis.

== List of defence ministers since 1996 ==
| Name | Took office | Left office | Party |
|---|---|---|---|
| Akis Tsochatzopoulos | 24 September 1996 | 23 October 2001 | Panhellenic Socialist Movement |
| Yiannos Papantoniou | 23 October 2001 | 10 March 2004 | Panhellenic Socialist Movement |
| Spilios Spiliotopoulos | 10 March 2004 | 15 February 2006 | New Democracy |
| Evangelos Meimarakis | 15 February 2006 | 7 October 2009 | New Democracy |
| Evangelos Venizelos | 7 October 2009 | 17 June 2011 | Panhellenic Socialist Movement |
| Panos Beglitis | 17 June 2011 | 11 November 2011 | Panhellenic Socialist Movement |
| Dimitris Avramopoulos | 11 November 2011 | 17 May 2012 | New Democracy |
| Frangoulis Frangos | 17 May 2012 | 21 June 2012 | Independent, former Chief of Army General Staff; caretaker cabinet |
| Panos Panagiotopoulos | 21 June 2012 | 25 June 2013 | New Democracy |
| Dimitris Avramopoulos | 25 June 2013 | 3 November 2014 | New Democracy |
| Nikos Dendias | 3 November 2014 | 27 January 2015 | New Democracy |
| Panos Kammenos | 27 January 2015 | 27 August 2015 | Independent Greeks |
| Ioannis Giangos | 28 August 2015 | 21 September 2015 | Independent, former Chief of National Defence General Staff; caretaker cabinet |
| Panos Kammenos | 23 September 2015 | 14 January 2019 | Independent Greeks |
| Evangelos Apostolakis | 14 January 2019 | 9 July 2019 | Independent, former Chief of National Defence General Staff |
| Nikos Panagiotopoulos | 9 July 2019 | 26 May 2023 | New Democracy |
| Alkiviadis Stefanis | 26 May 2023 | 27 June 2023 | Independent, former Chief of Army General Staff; caretaker cabinet |
| Nikos Dendias | 27 June 2023 | Incumbent | New Democracy |
