= Elliniki Agogi =

Greek educational organisation

- Ελληνική Αγωγή
- Founded: 1995
- Founder: Adonis Georgiades
- Location: Greece
- Key people: Eugenia Manolidou (Director)
- Website: https://www.ellinikiagogi.gr

Elliniki Agogi (Greek: Ελληνική Αγωγή) is an educational organisation based in Greece, founded in 1995 by Adonis Georgiades. It is dedicated to the teaching and promotion of Ancient Greek language and Greek cultural heritage through experiential, interactive, and historically rooted educational programs. Since 2016, the organisation has been under the academic direction of Eugenia Manolidou, who has expanded its scope nationally and internationally.

== Educational Philosophy and Method ==
Elliniki Agogi follows an active / experiential teaching approach (ενεργός / βιωματική μέθοδος), which aims to bring Ancient Greek to life through dramatization, storytelling, reenactment, music, and theatrical performance. The method is grounded in modern linguistic research but remains faithful to the classical structure and spirit of the Ancient Greek language.

Courses are available for children (ages 3–16) and adults, and the curriculum includes language, mythology, ancient history, ancient drama, philosophy, and lessons conducted in simple but authentic Ancient Greek. Students are introduced to core texts such as Aesop's fables, Plato’s dialogues, Xenophon, the Gospels, and Homeric epics. All lessons emphasize love for the language and cultural continuity from antiquity to modern Greece.

== Activities and Public Engagement ==
In addition to regular classes in Athens and online, Elliniki Agogi organizes:

• Summer camps and museum visits

• Educational programs for schools

• Educational excursions to historical sites

• Seminars for teachers (e.g., Ελληνίζοντες Διδάσκομεν)

• Delphi Classics, a symposium within the Delphi Economic Forum

• Public performances of Ancient Greek theater by students

== Publications ==
Elliniki Agogi began as a magazine in 1995, focusing on Greek language, history, and philosophy. Most texts were printed in polytonic script. Today, the organisation publishes children's books, textbooks, and educational materials through Ellinoekdotiki and other publishers.
