= Dimitris Avramopoulos =

Greek politician

- Δημήτρης Αβραμόπουλος
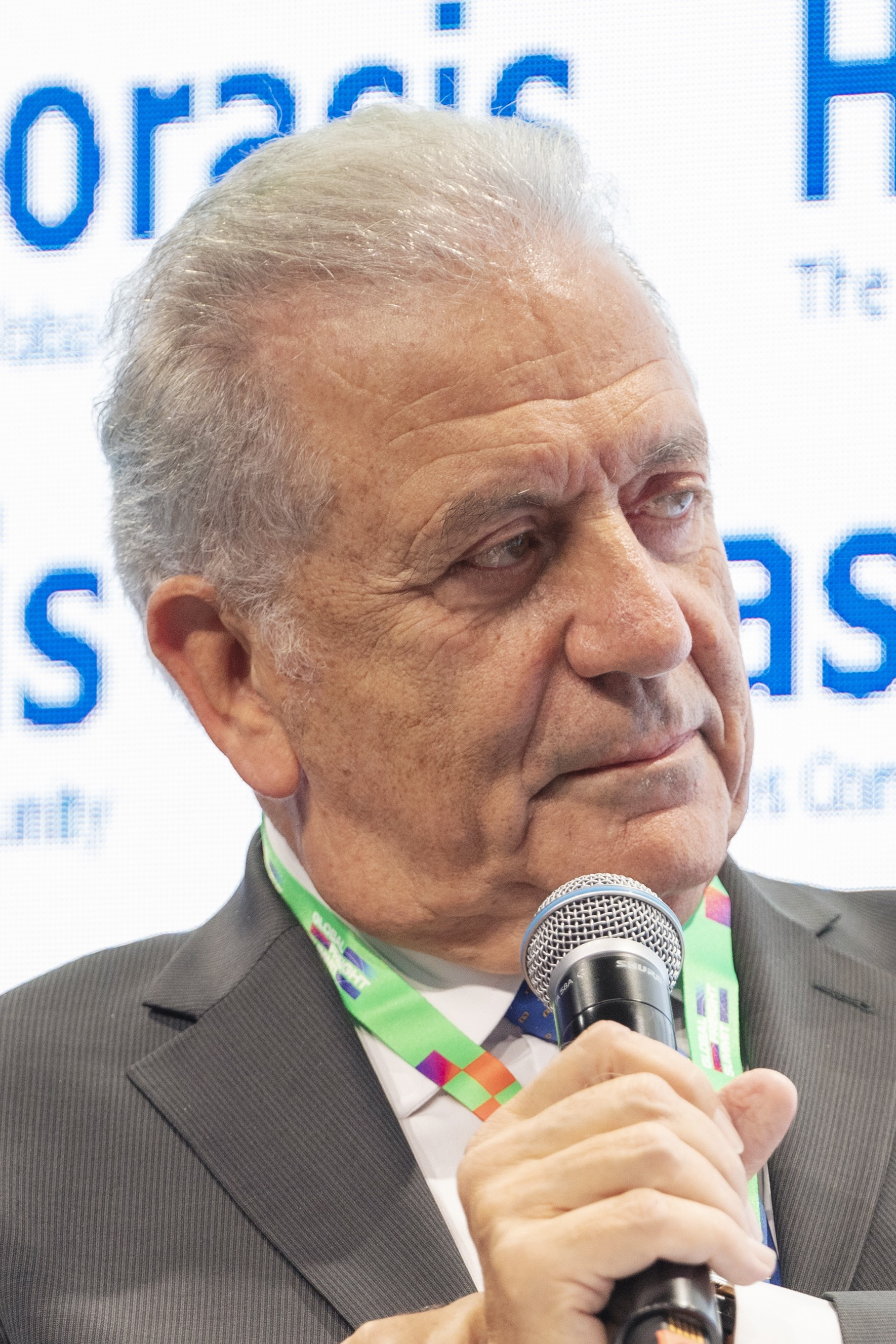
- Avramopoulos in 2024

Member of the Hellenic Parliament
- Incumbent
- Assumed office 21 May 2023
- In office 7 March 2004 – 31 December 2014
- In office 10 October 1993 – 31 December 1994

European Commissioner for Migration, Home Affairs and Citizenship
- In office 1 November 2014 – 30 November 2019
- Commission: Juncker
- Preceded by: Cecilia Malmström (Home Affairs); Martine Reicherts (Justice, Fundamental Rights and Citizenship)
- Succeeded by: Ylva Johansson

Deputy Leader of New Democracy
- In office 2 July 2010 – 8 March 2015 Serving with Stavros Dimas
- Leader: Antonis Samaras
- Preceded by: Position established
- Succeeded by: Adonis Georgiadis

Minister for National Defence
- In office 25 June 2013 – 31 October 2014
- Prime Minister: Antonis Samaras
- Preceded by: Panos Panagiotopoulos
- Succeeded by: Nikolaos Dendias
- In office 11 November 2011 – 17 May 2012
- Prime Minister: Lucas Papademos
- Preceded by: Panagiotis Beglitis
- Succeeded by: Frangoulis Frangos

Minister for Foreign Affairs
- In office 21 June 2012 – 25 June 2013
- Prime Minister: Antonis Samaras
- Preceded by: Petros Molyviatis
- Succeeded by: Evangelos Venizelos

Minister of Health and Social Solidarity
- In office 15 February 2007 – 7 October 2009
- Prime Minister: Kostas Karamanlis
- Preceded by: Nikitas Kaklamanis
- Succeeded by: Mariliza Xenogiannakopoulou

Minister of Tourism
- In office 18 March 2004 – 15 February 2006
- Prime Minister: Kostas Karamanlis
- Preceded by: Akis Tsochatzopoulos (Development)
- Succeeded by: Fani Palli-Petralia

Mayor of Athens
- In office 1 January 1995 – 31 December 2002
- Preceded by: Leonidas Kouris
- Succeeded by: Dora Bakoyannis

Personal details
- Born: 6 June 1953 (age 73) Athens, Kingdom of Greece
- Party: New Democracy
- Spouse: Vivian Spanoudi
- Children: 2
- Education: University of Athens; Université libre de Bruxelles

Dimitris Avramopoulos (Greek: Δημήτρης Αβραμόπουλος; born 6 June 1953) is a Greek politician of the conservative New Democracy party, and former career diplomat. He has served in various high-level cabinet posts, including Minister for Foreign Affairs and Minister for National Defence, and was Mayor of Athens from 1995 to 2002. He served as EU Commissioner for Migration, Home Affairs and Citizenship in the Juncker Commission between 2014 and 2019.

== Personal life ==
Avramopoulos was born in Athens in 1953, into a family which had originally come from Ilia and Elliniko in Arcadia. He served his 26 months military service from 1978 to 1980 in the Hellenic Air Force.

He is married to Vivian, with whom he has two sons, Filippos and Iasonas. Apart from his native Greek, he speaks English, French and Italian fluently.

== Diplomatic career ==
In 1980, Avramopoulos joined the Ministry of Foreign Affairs in Athens, where he worked until 1993. From 1988 to 1992, he served as Greek Consul to Belgium in Liège. At the same time he was a Special Adviser to Konstantinos Mitsotakis, President and Leader of the New Democracy. During this time he also represented Greece in Vienna at the Conference for Security and Co-operation in Europe. In 1992 he became official spokesman of the Greek Ministry of Foreign Affairs and was appointed Consul General of Greece in Geneva. In 1993 he was promoted to director of the Prime Minister of Greece's Diplomatic Office.

== Political career ==
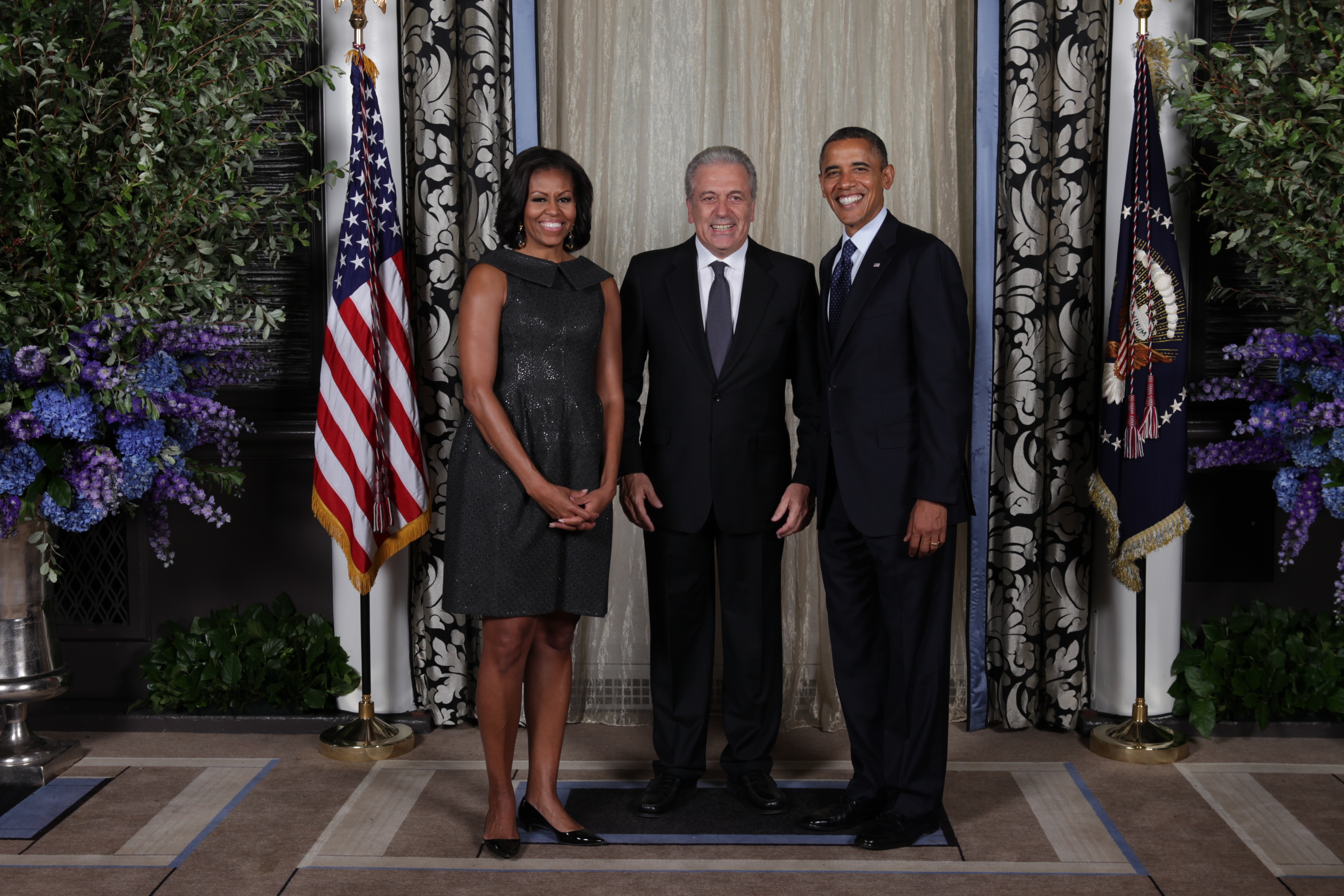
Dimitri Avramopoulos, Foreign Minister of Greece, with President Obama and the First Lady, at the 67th UN General Assembly in 2012

=== Mayor of Athens ===
In 1993, Avramopoulos resigned from Greek diplomatic service to enter parliamentary politics as a member of New Democracy and was elected a member of its Central Committee. From 1993 to 1994 he served as a Member of the Hellenic Parliament. In 1994 he was elected Mayor of Athens, and was re-elected in October 1998 in a historic first-round landslide victory. From 1995 to 1999 he served as chairman of the Central Union of Local Authorities of Greece.

In 1995 he founded the “Permanent Conference of the Mayors of the Capitals of South-East Europe” and served as its first President. From 1996 to 2000 he served as vice-president of the executive committee of the International Union of Local Authorities (IULA) and from 1997 to 2002, as a member of the Committee of the Regions of the European Union. Elected as president of the Summit Conference of the Mayors of the World in 2000, he served until 2002, during which time he founded the "World Union of Olympic Cities", "Athens’ International Prize for Democracy", and “World Institute of Global and Cities’ Diplomacy”, Rome.

=== Ministerial posts ===
In March 2001, he split from New Democracy with his Movement of Free Citizens (KEP), but in a surprising move merged back in June 2002. When in 2004 New Democracy won the parliamentary elections, Avramopoulos was appointed Minister of Tourism, serving until 2006, and afterwards, from 2006 until 2009, as Minister of Health and Social Solidarity.

In the October 2009 election, Avramopoulos was re-elected to the Hellenic Parliament representing the constituency of Athens A. After the election of Antonis Samaras to the “New Democracy” Party Presidency he was appointed President of the Organizing Committee of the 8th Party Congress held at Athens in June 2010. In July 2010, he became Vice-President of “New Democracy”, serving until 1 November 2014.

On 11 November 2011 he was appointed Minister for National Defence in the coalition government of Lucas Papademos, resigning from his parliamentary seat, thus adhering to the New Democracy policy that no serving Opposition Party Deputies may hold ministerial office.

At the 6 May 2012 election, Avramopoulos was returned as Deputy for Athens A, being re-elected in the 17 June 2012 general election. On 21 June 2012 he was appointed Minister for Foreign Affairs. After the Cabinet reshuffle of 25 June 2013 he became Greek Minister for Defence again, serving until his nomination as Greece's European Commissioner in November 2014.

=== European Commissioner for Migration and Home Affairs ===
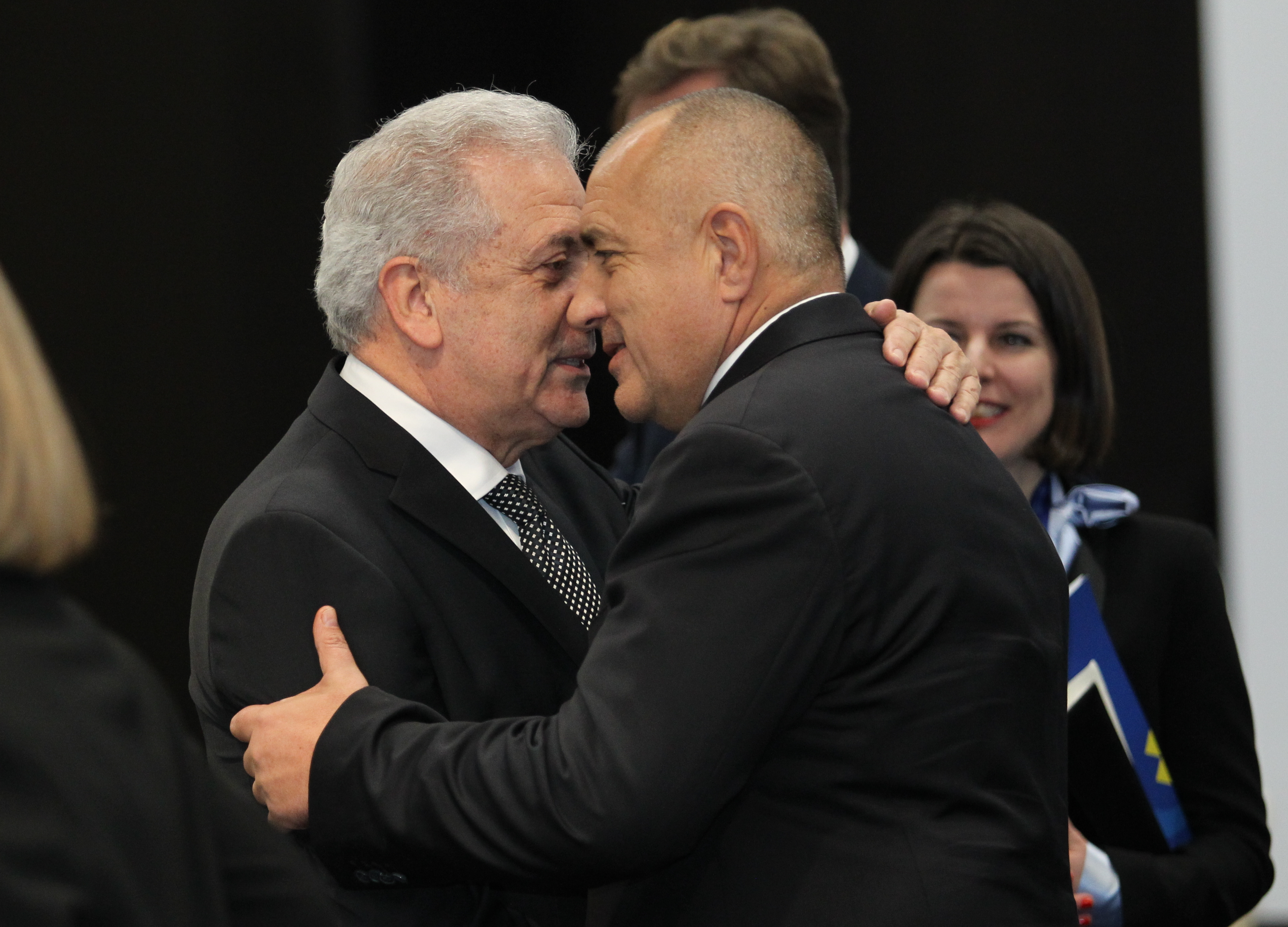
Avramopoulos and Bulgarian Prime Minister Boyko Borisov in 2018

On 27 July 2014, Prime Minister Antonis Samaras nominated Avramopoulos as Greece's next member of the European Commission. Before the nomination, Dora Bakoyiannis was widely seen to be a strong contender for the Commission post. Samaras also defied calls from the centre-left Pasok party for Maria Damanaki to continue as European Commissioner.

Jean-Claude Juncker then nominated Avramopoulos as European Commissioner for Migration and Home Affairs. In this capacity, Avramopoulos shares competency over cyber-security matters with Günther Oettinger.

In the aftermath of the victory of the left-wing SYRIZA party in the 25 January election in 2015, Avramopoulos' name was widely circulated in Greek media as the most likely choice for SYRIZA's candidate in the second round of the election for the Presidency of Greece. According to the Greek media reports, the nomination would be seen both as a gesture of conciliation with the right, but would crucially also enable SYRIZA to nominate its own European Commissioner. On 30 January Samaras phoned Avramopoulos and assured him that New Democracy would support his eventual nomination.

Avramopoulos criticized the 2019 Turkish offensive into north-eastern Syria. He said that "the European Union remains committed to the unity, sovereignty and territorial integrity of the Syrian state".

=== Member of Parliament ===
Avramopoulos was elected to the Hellenic Parliament in Elis at the June 2023 Greek legislative election.

=== Qatargate ===
From February 2021 to February 2022, Avramopoulos was paid €5,000 per month as a member of the board of the Brussels-based Non-governmental organization (NGO) Fight Impunity, having received approval from the EU ethics panel to take up the position. The founder and director of the NGO, Antonio Panzeri later confessed to orchestrating the Qatar corruption scandal at the European Parliament. In June 2026, the Belgian judiciary confirmed that a European arrest warrant had been issued for Avramopoulos in connection with the investigation into the scandal. Avramopoulos denied any wrongdoing. Later that month, Avramopoulos appealed to the Supreme Court of Greece to annul the arrest warrant on the grounds that it failed to include sufficient detail of the charges against him.

== Other positions ==
From the outset of his political career, Avramopoulos served for twenty years as Honorary President of the Athens’ International Prize for Democracy for UNESCO in Paris (until 2013). He has also been Chairman of the Steering Committee on Cities´ Diplomacy, established by the Global Forum (Rome) and the World Bank Institute (Washington D.C.). He was elected President of the “World Institute of Global and Cities’ Diplomacy”, an independent NGO based in Rome as well as Executive President of the “World Union of Olympic Cities”, an Olympic Games NGO.

== Greek-Turkish rapprochement ==
Avramopoulos has a friendly relation with the Turkish President Recep Tayyip Erdoğan since they were Mayors of Athens and Istanbul respectively. He is deemed one of the main proponents of Greek-Turkish rapprochement. Also this year the two former Mayors came together to discuss topics regarding Migration, Borders and Security on European and EU-level in Istanbul on 3 June 2019. On the same day, Avramopoulos also met with Turkish Interior Minister Süleyman Soylu to discuss about the same topic.

== Academic degrees ==
Avramopoulos read Public Law and Political Science at Athens University Law School, graduating with the degree of Bachelor of Arts (BA). He then undertook postgraduate studies receiving a Master's degree in European Studies at the Institute of European Affairs, Université libre de Bruxelles. He has been conferred honorary doctorates by Adelphi University (Long Island, New York), Deree College (Athens), Drexel University (Philadelphia) and Kingston University (London), and has been elected Honorary Professor of Peking University (Beijing) and of the European College of Parma (Italy).

== Honours ==
Avramopoulos has received numerous honors from European States as well as many countries around the world for his diplomatic, public and charitable service:

Grand Cross, Order of the Phoenix (Greece)

Grand Cross, Order of Civil Merit (Spain)

Grand Cross, Order of the Crown (Belgium)

Grand Cross, Order of Leopold II (Belgium)

Grand Cross, Order of the Polar Star (Sweden)

Grand Cross, Order of the Lion (Finland)

Grand Cross, Order of Merit (Portugal)

1st Class, Order of the White Star (Estonia)

Commander, Order of Merit (Poland)

Commandeur de l’Ordre de la Couronne de Chêne (Luxembourg)

Grand Decoration, Honour for Services to the Republic (Austria)

Companion, National Order of Merit (Malta)

Officer, Legion d'Honneur (France)

Officer, Order of Merit (Luxembourg)

Knight, National Order of Merit (France)

Commander, Order of Merit (Germany)

Grand Cordon, National Order of the Cedar (Lebanon)

1st Class, Order for Civil Merit (Bulgaria)

Knight, Order of Makarios III (Cyprus)

Grand Cross, Order of Diego de Losada (Venezuela)

1st Class, Order of the Star (Yugoslavia)

And, from the Ecumenical Orthodox Patriarchate of Constantinople, the Patriarchate of Jerusalem and the Patriarchate of Alexandria:

- Grand Cross, Order of the Holy Sepulchre
- Grand Cross, Order of the Apostle and Evangelist Mark
- Grand Cross, Order of Saints George and Constantine.

=== Distinctions and awards ===
Avramopoulos received, in 2006, the “Vincitore Assoluto” Award of the Premio Internazionale “Giuseppe Sciacca”, and has been presented with distinctions by many foreign Cities and Municipalities: Famagusta, Barcelona, Beijing, Beirut, Berlin, Boston, Brooklyn N.Y., Bucharest, Caracas, Chicago, Crotone, Florence, Genoa, Jakarta, Havana, Istanbul, Kyiv, Ljubljana, Los Angeles, Miami -Florida, Massachusetts, Montreal, Moscow, New Jersey, New York, Nicosia, Paris, Philadelphia, Providence, Rhode Island, Rome, Sofia, State of Illinois, Sydney, Tbilisi, Tirana, Toronto, Valletta, Washington D.C., Xi'an, Yerevan. He has been honoured with the Honorary Freedom of 40 Greek and foreign cities. In November 2017, he became Honorary Member of the Propeller Club of the United States Port of Piraeus and he received the Award of Excellence of the Propeller Club of the United States Port of Piraeus for his strenuous effort and impact on developing a new European Policy on regular Migration. In December 2017, the Department of International and European Studies of the University of Piraeus awarded Mr. Avramopoulos the first "Themistocles" prize for his contribution to the management of the EU migration and security crisis.

Political offices
Preceded by Leonidas Kouris	Mayor of Athens; 1995–2002	Succeeded by Dora Bakoyannis
Preceded by Akis Tsochatzopoulos as Minister for Development	Minister for Tourism; 2004–2007	Succeeded by Fani Palli-Petralia
Preceded by Nikitas Kaklamanis	Minister for Health and Social Solidarity; 2007–2009	Succeeded by Mariliza Xenogiannakopoulou
Preceded by Panagiotis Beglitis	Minister for National Defence; 2011–2012	Succeeded by Frangoulis Frangos
Preceded by Petros Molyviatis	Minister for Foreign Affairs; 2012–2013	Succeeded by Evangelos Venizelos
Preceded by Panos Panagiotopoulos	Minister for National Defence; 2013–2014	Succeeded by Nikolaos Dendias
Preceded by Maria Damanaki	Greek European Commissioner; 2014–2019	Succeeded by Margaritis Schinas
Preceded by Cecilia Malmström as European Commissioner for Home Affairs	European Commissioner for Migration, Home Affairs and Citizenship; 2014–2019	Succeeded by Ylva Johansson
Preceded by Martine Reicherts as European Commissioner for Justice, Fundamental Rights and Citizenship	European Commissioner for Migration, Home Affairs and Citizenship; 2014–2019	Succeeded by Ylva Johansson
