= Giannis Plakiotakis =

Greek politician

- Γιάννης Πλακιωτάκης
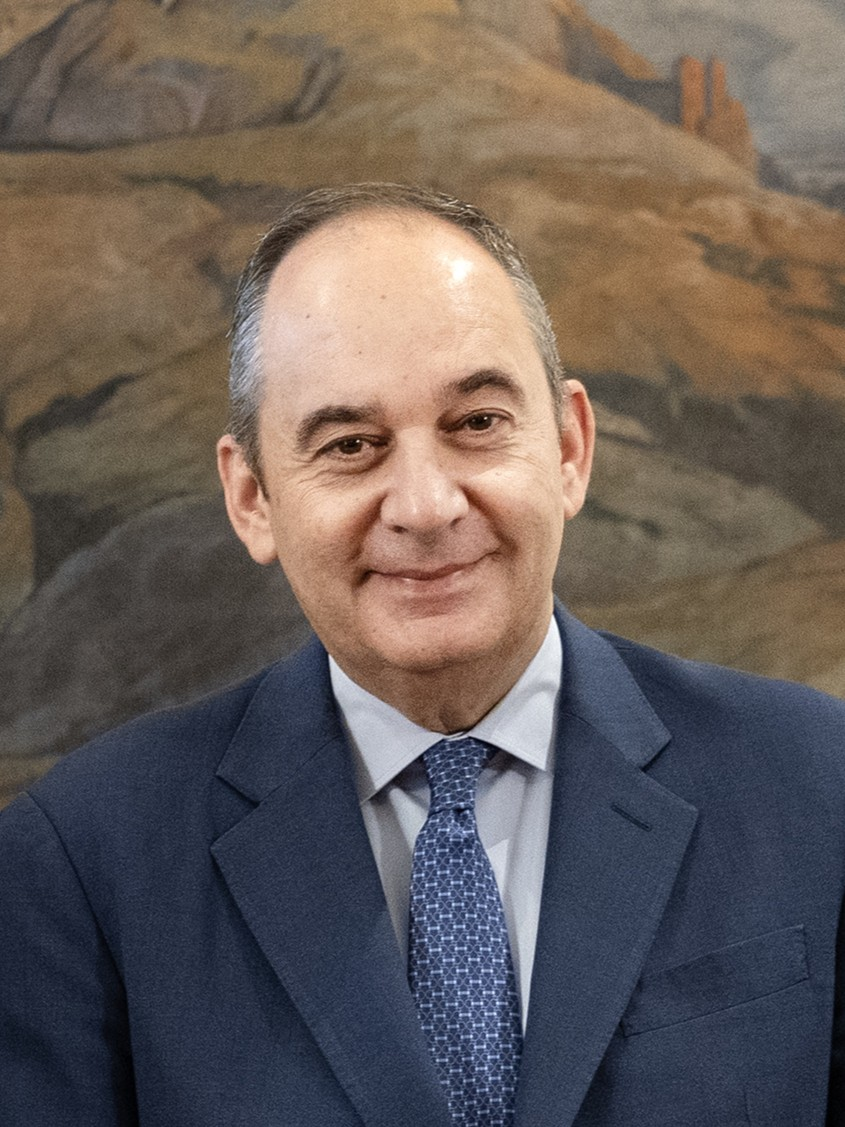
- Plakiotakis in 2026

Deputy Speaker of the Hellenic Parliament
- Incumbent
- Assumed office 4 July 2023
- President: Konstantinos Tasoulas; Nikitas Kaklamanis
- Preceded by: Nikitas Kaklamanis

Minister for Shipping and Island Policy
- In office 9 July 2019 – 26 May 2023
- Prime Minister: Kyriakos Mitsotakis
- Preceded by: Fotis Kouvelis
- Succeeded by: Theodoros Kliaris

Leader of the Opposition
- In office 24 November 2015 – 10 January 2016
- Prime Minister: Alexis Tsipras
- Preceded by: Vangelis Meimarakis
- Succeeded by: Kyriakos Mitsotakis

Interim President of New Democracy
- In office 24 November 2015 – 10 January 2016
- Preceded by: Vangelis Meimarakis (interim)
- Succeeded by: Kyriakos Mitsotakis

Member of the Hellenic Parliament
- Incumbent
- Assumed office 7 March 2004
- Constituency: Lasithi

Personal details
- Born: 10 July 1968 (age 58) Athens, Greece
- Party: New Democracy
- Education: University of Wales; University of London; City University London

Giannis Plakiotakis (Greek: Γιάννης Πλακιωτάκης; born 10 July 1968) is a Greek politician who served as the acting President of New Democracy following the resignation of Vangelis Meimarakis. He has been a Member of the Hellenic Parliament (MP) for Lasithi since 2004.

== Early life and education ==
Plakiotakis was born in Athens and studied biochemical engineering at the University of Wales. He then completed a Master's degree in biochemical engineering at the University of London before completing another master's degree in business administration at City University London.

== Political career ==
Plakiotakis has been a member of New Democracy since 1987. He was a municipal advisor for the Sitia municipality from 1990 to 2002. He was first elected as a New Democracy Member of the Hellenic Parliament for Lasithi in 2004, being re-elected in every election since.

In October 2007, Plakiotakis was appointed as a Deputy Minister for National Defence. In 2015, he was the secretary of the New Democracy parliamentary group.

On 24 November 2015, Vangelis Meimarakis appointed Plakiotakis as a Vice President of New Democracy whilst he considered whether or not to resign. Later that day, Meimarakis resigned, appointing Plakiotakis as the interim President of the party until the conclusion of the New Democracy leadership election.

Party political offices
Preceded by Vangelis Meimarakis; Acting	President of New Democracy; Acting; 2015–2016	Succeeded by Kyriakos Mitsotakis
Political offices
Preceded by Vangelis Meimarakis	Leader of the Opposition; 2015–2016	Succeeded by Kyriakos Mitsotakis
