= Frangoulis Frangos =

Greek army officer (born 1951)

Frangoulis Frangos Φραγκούλης Φράγκος

Minister for National Defence
- In office 17 May 2012 – 21 June 2012
- Preceded by: Dimitris Avramopoulos
- Succeeded by: Panos Panagiotopoulos

Chief of the Hellenic Army General Staff
- In office 6 August 2009 – 1 November 2011
- Preceded by: Dimitrios Voulgaris
- Succeeded by: Konstantinos Ziazias

Personal details
- Born: 1951 (age 74–75) Komotini, Greece
- Occupation: Hellenic Army officer

Military service
- Allegiance: Greece
- Branch: Hellenic Army
- Years: 1970–2011
- Rank: General
- Commands: Chief of the Hellenic Army General Staff; Commander of the First Army

General Frangoulis Frangos (Greek: Φραγκούλης Φράγκος, born Komotini 1951) is a retired Greek Army officer, former chief of the Hellenic Army General Staff and former Minister for National Defence.

He was born in Komotini and entered the Hellenic Military Academy in 1970, graduating in 1974 first of his class and being named a Second Lieutenant of Infantry. He is a graduate of the Supreme War School and of the NATO Defence College. He also pursued studies in law at the University of Athens, continuing with post-graduate courses in European and International Law at the Panteion University. Frangos also received a doctorate in Geopolitics from the Ionian University. He served in Special Forces units early in his career, qualifying as a paratrooper, as well as in staff and command positions of larger formations, as well as Greece's army attaché and defence attaché in the Greek embassy in Ankara, Turkey. Frangos commanded the 32nd Marines Brigade in 2002–2003, before being assigned to head the Hellenic National Defence General Staff's Planning Directorate. In 2004 he was promoted to major general and assumed command of the Inter-service Military Intelligence Directorate. In 2006 he assumed command of the 16th Mechanized Infantry Division. A year later he was promoted to Lt. General and assumed command of the II Army Corps, and in 2008 he was placed as commander of the First Army in Larissa. On 6 August 2009, by decision of the Government Council for Foreign Affairs and Defence, he was appointed Chief of the Hellenic Army General Staff, a position he held until a surprise major reshuffle in the Greek military leadership on 1 November 2011. Frangos retired with the rank of full General.

On 17 May 2012 he was named as Minister for National Defence in the caretaker cabinet of Panagiotis Pikrammenos, which led the country until the June general election.

General Frangos is married and has two children. He also speaks English, Russian and Turkish.

Political offices
Preceded by Dimitris Avramopoulos	Minister for National Defence of Greece; 17 May – 21 June 2012	Succeeded by Panos Panagiotopoulos
Military offices
Preceded by Lt General Dimitrios Voulgaris	Chief of the Hellenic Army General Staff; 6 August 2009 – 1 November 2011	Succeeded by Lt General Konstantinos Ziazias
