= List of international prime ministerial trips made by Antonis Samaras =

This is a list of international trips made by Antonis Samaras, as Prime Minister of Greece, from 20 June 2012 to 26 January 2015.

== Summary of international trips ==
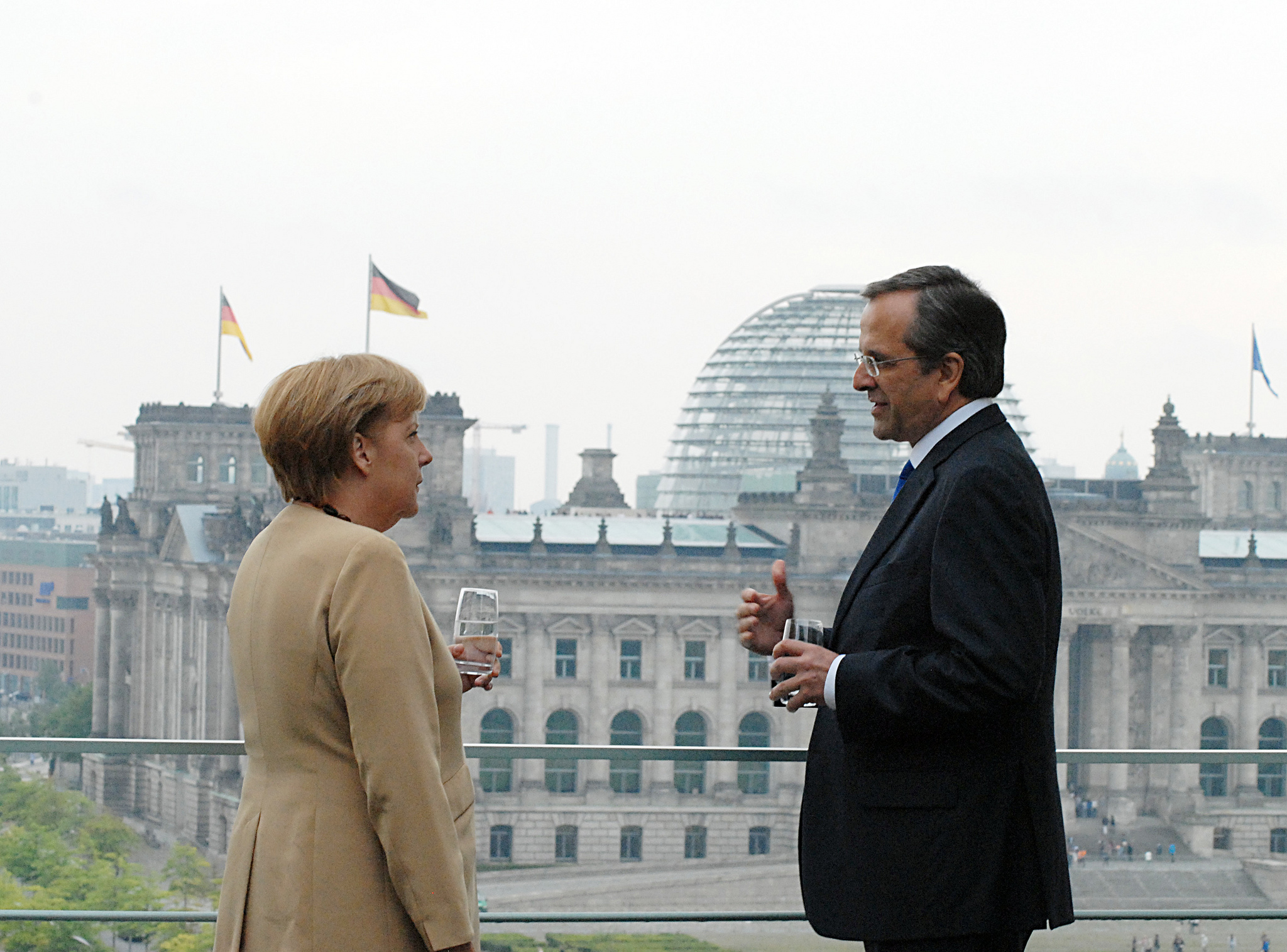
Antonis Samaras and Angela Merkel in Berlin (2012).

=== 2012 ===
Country	Areas visited	Date(s)	Details
Germany	Berlin	24 August	Met with Chancellor Angela Merkel.
France	Paris	25-26 August	Met with President Francois Hollande.
Italy	Rome	20-22 September	Met with Prime Minister Mario Monti and Pope Benedict XVI.
Belgium	Brussels	18-19 October	Joined the EU summit.
Belgium	Brussels	13-14 November	Joined the EU summit.
Malta	Valletta	15 November	Met with Prime Minister Lawrence Gonzi.
Belgium	Brussels	22-23 November	Joined the EU summit.
Belgium	Brussels	15-16 December	Joined the EU summit.

=== 2013 ===
Country	Areas visited	Date(s)	Details
Germany	Berlin	7-8 January	Met with Chancellor Angela Merkel.
Qatar	Doha	29-30 January	Met with Prime Minister Hamad bin Jaber Al Thani and Crown Prince Tamim bin Hamad Al Thani.
Belgium	Brussels	7-9 February	Joined the EU summit.
Turkey	Istanbul	4-5 March	Met with Prime Minister Recep Tayyip Erdoğan.
Belgium	Brussels	13-14 March	Joined the EU summit.
China	Beijing	16-18 May	Met with Premier Li Keqiang and President Xi Jinping.
Azerbaijan	Baku	19 May	Met with President Ilham Aliyev.
Belgium	Brussels	22 May	Joined the EU summit.
Finland	Helsinki	5-6 June	Met with Prime Minister Jyrki Katainen.
Belgium	Brussels	27-28 June	Joined the EU summit.
USA	Washington, D.C.	7-10 August	Met with President Barack Obama and Secretary-General of the U.N. Ban Ki-moon.
Belgium	Brussels	17 September	Went to assume the Presidency of the Council of the E.U.
Israel	Jerusalem	7-8 October	Met with Prime Minister Benjamin Netanyahu.
Belgium	Brussels	24-25 October	Joined the EU summit.
Germany	Berlin	21-22 November	Met with Chancellor Angela Merkel.
Belgium	Brussels	18-19 December	Joined the EU summit.

=== 2014 ===
Country	Areas visited	Date(s)	Details
Russia	Moscow	27-28 January	Met with President Vladimir Putin.
Belgium	Brussels	20-21 March	Joined the EU summit.
Belgium	Brussels	27 May	Joined the EU summit.
Azerbaijan	Baku	21 September	Met with President Ilham Aliyev.
Germany	Berlin	23 September	Met with Chancellor Angela Merkel.
Italy	Milan	17 October	Joined the Asia–Europe Meeting.
Belgium	Brussels	23-24 October	Joined the EU summit.
Cyprus	Nicosia	6-8 November	Met with President Nicos Anastasiades and delivered a speech in front of the Cypriot House of Representatives.

=== 2015 ===
Country	Areas visited	Date(s)	Details
France	Paris	11 January	Met with President François Hollande. Joined the Republican marches.
