= Panagiotis Beglitis =

Greek politician (born 1957)

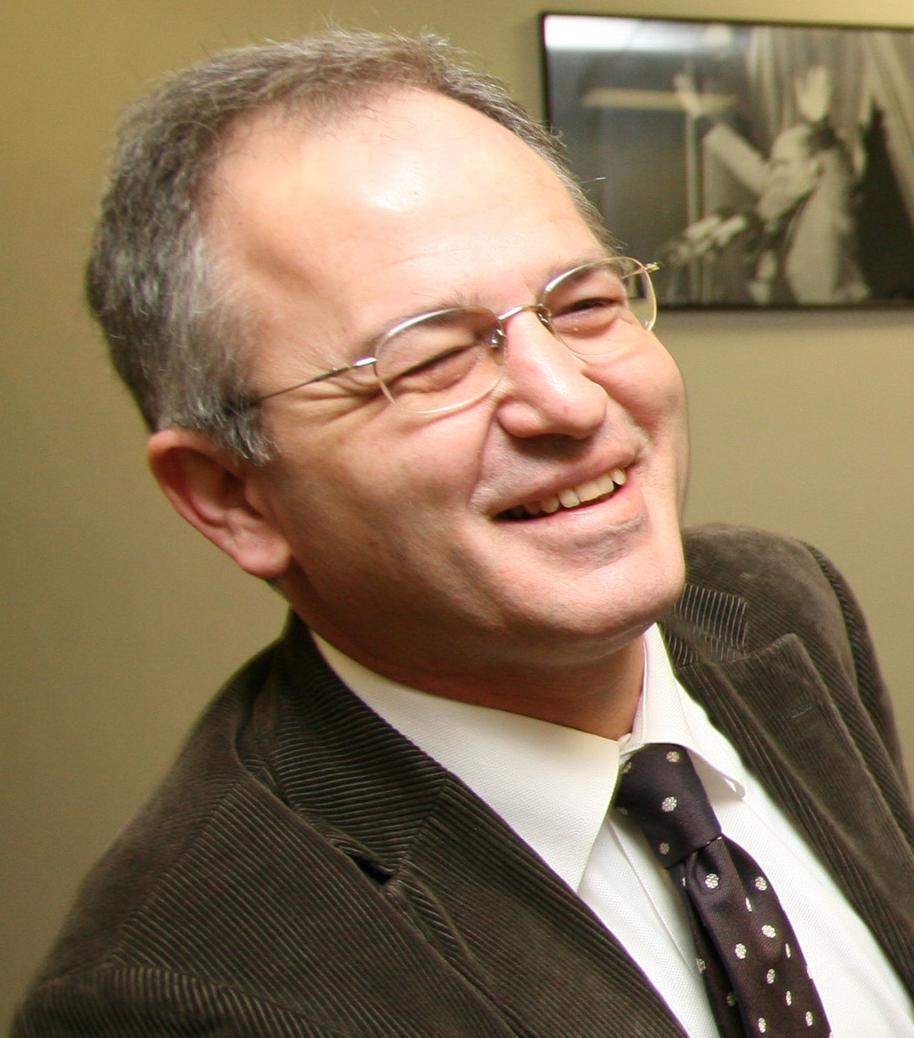
Panagiotis Beglitis, a Greek politician

Panagiotis Beglitis (Greek: Παναγιώτης Μπεγλίτης) (born 25 February 1957, Velo) is a Greek politician, who from 2004-07 was a Member of the European Parliament (MEP) for the Panhellenic Socialist Movement, part of the Party of European Socialists.

In the 2007 Greek legislative election he was elected to the Hellenic Parliament for Corinthia, and consequently resigned from the European Parliament. Beglitis served as Minister for National Defence between 17 June and 11 November 2011, and as Alternate Minister between 7 October 2009 and 16 June 2011.
