= Adonis Georgiadis =

Greek politician (born 1972)

- Άδωνις Γεωργιάδης
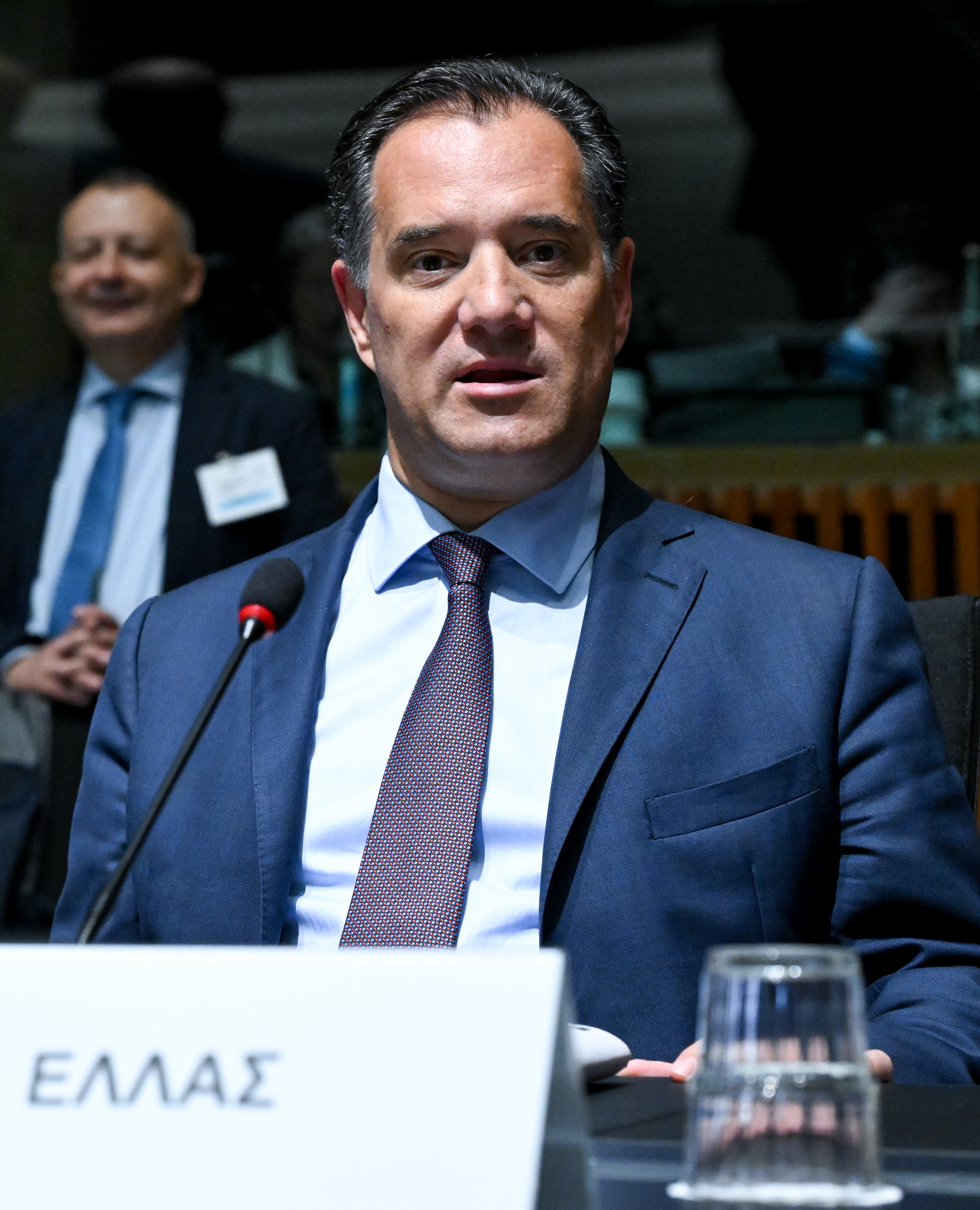
- Georgiadis in 2024

Minister for Health
- Incumbent
- Assumed office 4 January 2024
- Prime Minister: Kyriakos Mitsotakis
- Preceded by: Michalis Chrisochoidis
- In office 25 June 2013 – 10 June 2014
- Prime Minister: Antonis Samaras
- Preceded by: Andreas Lykourentzos
- Succeeded by: Makis Voridis

Minister for Labour and Social Security
- In office 27 June 2023 – 4 January 2024
- Prime Minister: Kyriakos Mitsotakis
- Preceded by: Patrina Paparrigopoulou (caretaker)
- Succeeded by: Domna Michailidou

Minister for Development and Investment
- In office 9 July 2019 – 26 May 2023
- Prime Minister: Kyriakos Mitsotakis
- Preceded by: Yannis Dragasakis (Economy and Development)
- Succeeded by: Eleni Louri-Dendrinou (caretaker)

Deputy Minister for Development, Competitiveness and Shipping
- In office 11 November 2011 – 11 February 2012
- Prime Minister: Lucas Papademos

Vice President of New Democracy
- Incumbent
- Assumed office 18 January 2016 Serving with Kostis Hatzidakis
- President: Kyriakos Mitsotakis

Member of the Hellenic Parliament
- Incumbent
- Assumed office 7 July 2019
- Constituency: Athens B1
- In office 6 May 2012 – 12 June 2019
- In office 16 September 2007 – 17 February 2012
- Constituency: Athens B

Personal details
- Born: 6 November 1972 (age 53) Athens, Greece
- Party: New Democracy (2012–present); Popular Orthodox Rally (2003–2012)
- Spouse: Eugenia Manolidou
- Children: 2
- Education: University of Athens (BA)
- Website: www.adonisgeorgiadis.gr

Spyridon-Adonis Georgiadis (Greek: Σπυρίδων-Άδωνις Γεωργιάδης; born 6 November 1972), commonly known as Adonis Georgiadis, is a Greek politician, author, publisher and former telemarketer. Often described as being on the far-right of the political spectrum, he currently serves as Vice President of New Democracy and Minister for Health in the Second Cabinet of Kyriakos Mitsotakis.

He previously served in the same cabinet as Minister for Labour and Social Security (2023–2024), Minister for Development and Investment in the First Cabinet of Kyriakos Mitsotakis (2019–2023), Minister for Health in the Cabinet of Antonis Samaras (2013–2014) and Deputy Minister for Development, Competitiveness and Shipping in the Cabinet of Lucas Papademos (2011–2012).

== Early career ==
Georgiadis started working at his father's bookstore at the age of 15. He graduated with a Bachelor of Arts in history from the Department of History and Archaeology of the School of Philosophy of the University of Athens at the age of 31.

== Political career ==
Georgiadis joined the Popular Orthodox Rally (LAOS) in 2003, serving as party spokesman from December 2003 to August 2007. He ran for the office of Prefect of Athens in the 2006 local elections. On 16 September 2007, he was elected a member of the Hellenic Parliament for the Athens B constituency, and was re-elected in October 2009. He ran as the LAOS candidate for Governor of Attica in the 2010 local elections.

On 11 November 2011, Georgiadis was appointed Deputy Minister for Development, Competitiveness and Shipping in the coalition government of Lucas Papademos. He resigned the position on 11 February 2012, amidst a row with party leader Georgios Karatzaferis over the latter's opposition to the Second Economic Adjustment Programme for Greece. On 13 February, he and Makis Voridis were expelled from the LAOS parliamentary group for voting in favor of the second bailout against the party line. On 17 February, Georgiadis joined New Democracy, having given up his parliamentary seat to LAOS. He was subsequently re-elected on the New Democracy ticket at the elections held in May and June 2012, and has retained his seat at every election held since, representing Athens B until 2019 and Athens B1 thereafter.

He was appointed Minister for Health in the coalition government of Antonis Samaras, serving from June 2013 to June 2014. As minister, Georgiadis gave complete free pharmaceutical coverage to more than 2.000.000 uninsured citizens, with the cost being set at 340 million euros. In September 2014, Georgiadis was appointed parliamentary spokesman for New Democracy.

His consistent electoral success has seen him rise through the party ranks, and he was one of the four candidates in the 2015–16 New Democracy leadership election. He campaigned for liberal reforms, tax and spending cuts and a battle against the "ideological hegemony" of the Left. In the first round, he received 46,065 votes (11.40%) and finished last among the four candidates. In the second round, he supported Kyriakos Mitsotakis, who won the election and became the new party leader. On 18 January 2016, Georgiadis was appointed one of the party's two vice-presidents, serving alongside Kostis Hatzidakis ever since.

== Television ==
Until his expulsion from LAOS, Georgiadis often appeared on TeleAsty, a television channel founded and run by party leader Georgios Karatzaferis. On his daily programme Ellinon Egersis (Greek: Ἑλλήνων Ἔγερσις, "Hellenes' Awakening"), which later moved to Kontra Channel, he and his brother Leonidas commented on current affairs and advertised books of mainly historical and philological interest, both from the family's own publishing house and other Greek publishers. He also publishes the magazine Elliniki Agogi, which covers issues of national and historical interest. In 1994, Georgiadis founded an organization of the same name to promote the teaching of the language and civilization of ancient Greece to children and adults.

== Author ==
Georgiadis has written Homosexuality in Ancient Greece: the Myth Collapses in which he argues that whereas homosexuality was present in Ancient Greece as in other countries, its extent and social acceptance have been inflated. In a 2015 TV show discussing his book, he claimed that "homosexuality did not exist in Ancient Greece". He had also previously written a Guide to Ancient Greek Coins.

He has also written the historical novel Theodora Phranza: or, the Fall of Constantinople. Greek journalist Tasos Kostopoulos has claimed that this book is the product of plagiarism of a 19th-century English book by John Mason Neale. Moreover, according to Kostopoulos, Georgiadis added some characters to the English original, including Bartholomew, a Jewish advisor to the Sultan Mehmet. In the book, Bartholomew has the following dialogue with the Sultan: "You are a really valuable advisor. Had it not been for your advice, I do not know whether I would be here now, besieging Constantinople. You must really hate the Greeks, since you work so relentlessly for their destruction." To which the Jew answers: "I hate them! Nobody in the world will be happier than I when Constantinople will fall to your hands." Kostopoulos' claims were supported by a number of Greek journalists. Georgiadis reply was that he had never hidden he had adapted a previous work.

== Other activities ==
- European Bank for Reconstruction and Development (EBRD), Ex-Officio Member of the Board of Governors (since 2019)

== Political positions ==
Georgiadis' speaking style might have a nuance of the more formal katharevousa. He also advocates the use of the polytonic system for writing the Greek language; Elliniki Agogi is written in this system, which has not been the prevailing practice in Greek publishing since the 1980s. Georgiadis has called for more research to investigate whether the introduction of the monotonic system was beneficial or not to the Greek culture and education. Once appointed Deputy Minister for Development, Competitiveness and Shipping he changed the signs at his ministry to conform to the polytonic system.

Georgiadis often condemns the opinions expressed in left-wing publications such as Eleftherotypia or by left-wing politicians such as those of Syriza, with both parties having exchanged sharp-tongued criticism. He also routinely condemned the policies of the two former leading Greek parties, New Democracy and the Panhellenic Socialist Movement, which he viewed as two sides of the same coin. He has often used the term tholokoultoura (Greek: θολοκουλτούρα; hazy-culture) to group his left-wing ideological opponents:

The hazy-culture is a very specific thing: it is a group of people who believe that to remember our national ancestry is a factor of conservatism. They are today the best allies of globalization. What is the goal of globalization? It wants to destroy every notion of a national tradition and a national memory so as to transform the totality of the population of our planet into simple customers of multi-national corporations and into complacent subjects of the world-ruling Superpower.

— Adonis Georgiadis in Greek TV show Erevna hosted by Pavlos Tsimas, March 13, 2007

He often states that the destruction of the Greek economy and Greek society began in 1981 with the election of Andreas Papandreou as PM and the party of PASOK.

During the recent 2015-16 New Democracy leadership election, he accused Syriza of being "a second-time PASOK". He described himself as "liberal" in economic matters, while often stated that is necessary to break the "hegemony of the Left on the ideas" inside the Greek society. He stated "I want to be in Greece, what Nicolas Sarkozy is in France", while rejected the policies of Marine Le Pen and her euroscepticism as anti-European.

Another case of criticism to the Left from Georgiadis' side is about the educational system, and especially the universities system. According to him, the leftists dominate the Greek universities. He has many times expressed his will for the abolition of the "university asylum" (laws that forbid to the Greek police the entry to a Greek university), stating that it is only a tool for the anarchists to burn and destroy Greek universities.

Georgiadis is in favour of putting an end to Greece's "eternal students", people who have been enrolled at university for years without graduating. However, he came under attack from Greek media when in December 2012 it became known that he had earned his degree at the age of 31.

Georgiadis is pro-Israel, saying that he "admires" it, and denies the Gaza genocide. He has stated "Israel is a democracy and that's why we support it while Gaza is not". He has also disputed or publicly doubted the United Nations and the International Court of Justice.

== Controversy ==
He has been criticised, among other things, because of his past with the Popular Orthodox Rally party, for a series of far-right positions that he has formulated, but also for the closure of five hospitals in Athens and Thessaloniki during his tenure as Minister for Health. For a number of years he advertised antisemitic content from the book of Konstantinos Plevris, an event for which he later apologised to the Jewish community. He himself denies that he has been a far-rightist.

Georgiadis, in the past, has been accused of "troubling remarks about Jews and his public promotion of an anti-Semitic book by a pro-claimed anti-semite". Georgiadis has countered that he sells these books like other Greek bookstores, saying that he disagrees with their content. In October 2015, when he was a candidate for New Democracy, he described the engagement with the Plevris Book of the Jews as "the biggest mistake of my political career to date," but he said he never was an anti-Semite. In January 2017, at the Holocaust memorial day, he publicly apologized for tolerating the views of people who showed disrespect to Greek Jews, for supporting and promoting the anti-semitic book of Konstantinos Plevris “Jews: The Whole Truth” and for his friendly relations with him.

Regarding the Athens Polytechnic Uprising, Georgiadis has claimed that "there was no one dead inside the Polytechnic School, not a single one! The Polytechnic Uprising is the foundational political myth of the ideological domination of the Left in Greece". They got the police report of the previous day, of the same day and of the next day and whoever died in Attica of whatever reason became a victim of snipers." His statements have been criticized by the media. Syriza has called Georgiadis's claims an "ahistorical abjection".

On 16 November 2017, Georgiadis announced that he would cease working as a telemarketer. A few days earlier he came under intense criticism after it was revealed that the healing effects supposedly provided by the nanotechnological jackets that he was promoting were in fact void and based on pseudoscience. Fellow telemarketer Makis Triandafillopoulos had been previously convicted of fraud for selling exactly the same model of nano jackets following an investigation by the Greek consumer protection agency.

On February 1, 2021, Georgiadis mocked the move of the restaurant businessmen to hand over the keys of their shops to the Prime Minister Kyriakos Mitsotakis who with one of the most extreme quarantines for COVID-19 in the world has banned the operation of these businesses for months. More specifically, Georgiadis told SKAI TV that any restaurant businessman can hand over the keys and his own business to him in order to operate it.

In May 2021, Georgiadis in a TV appearance supported the distinctions between Greek citizens and tourists regarding the observance of the measures against COVID-19. More specifically, Georgiadis stated that the traffic restrictions in Greece may apply after May 15, 2021, when tourism opens in the country, but that these restrictions will apply only to Greek citizens and not to tourists.

== Attacks against Georgiadis' bookstore ==
One of the bookstores of Georgiadis publishers (Ekdoseis Georgiadi), in the Exarcheia district of Athens, has been targeted and burnt 17 times by unidentified opponents. Georgiadis has since moved this bookstore, stating that he did so to protect the anti-riot police that was tasked to protect his business. In November 2012, Georgiadis closed down his bookshop.

== Personal life ==
He is married to classical composer and reality TV celebrity Eugenia Manolidou raising a son and a daughter from her previous marriage, and two own sons named Athanasios-Perseas born 2009 and Alkaios-Anastasios, born 2014.

Political offices
Preceded by Andreas Lykourentzos	Minister for Health; 2013–2014	Succeeded by Makis Voridis
Preceded by Yannis Dragasakis (Economy and Development)	Minister for Development and Investment; 2019–2023	Succeeded by Eleni Louri-Dendrinou (caretaker)
Preceded by Patrina Paparrigopoulou (caretaker)	Minister for Labour and Social Security; 2023–2024	Succeeded by Domna Michailidou
Preceded by Michalis Chrisochoidis	Minister for Health; 2024–present	Incumbent
