= Spilios Spiliotopoulos =

Greek politician (born 1941)

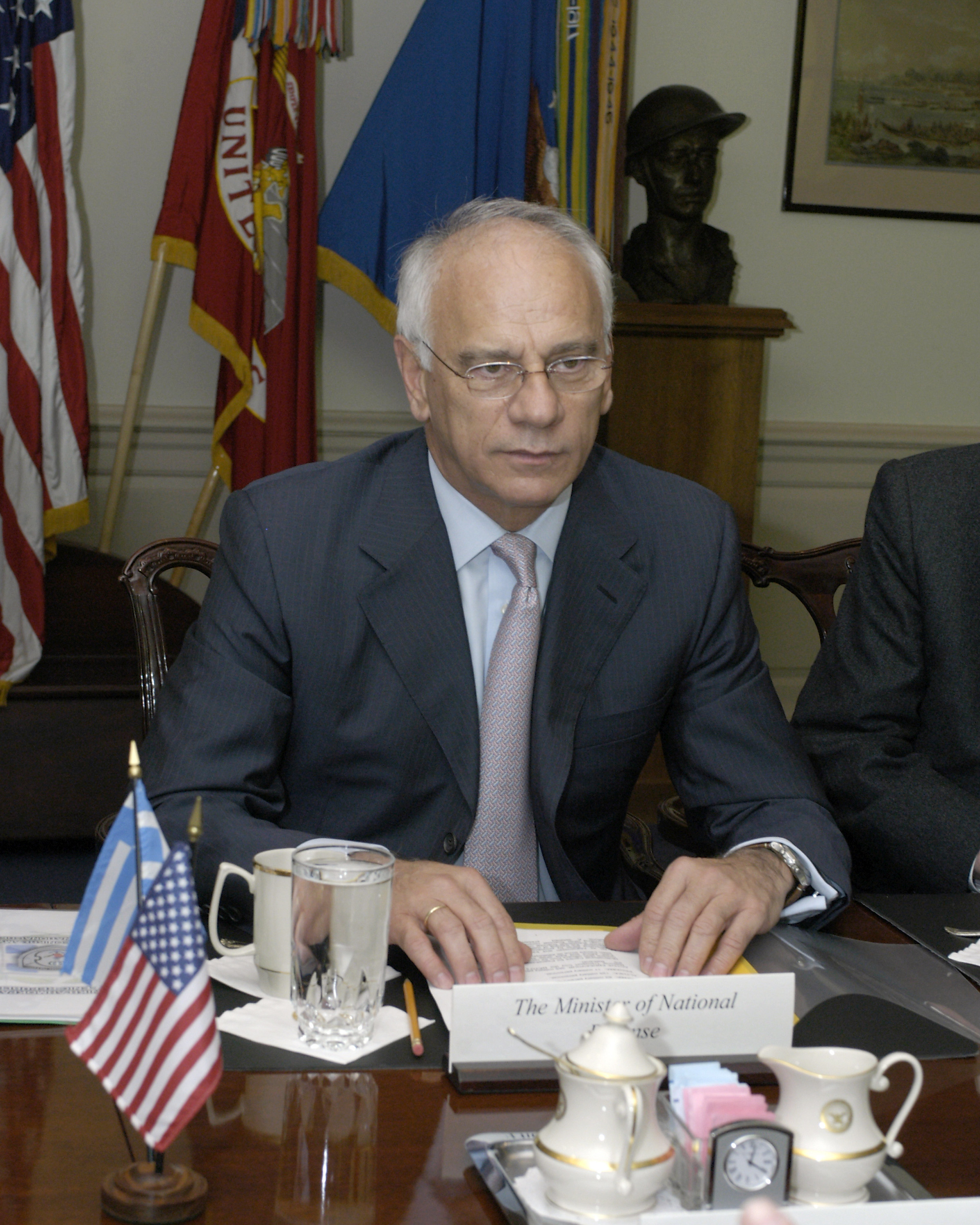
Spilios Spiliotopoulos

Spilios Spiliotopoulos (Greek: Σπήλιος Σπηλιοτόπουλος; born 1941 in Patras) was the Greek Minister of National Defence from May 2004 until February 2006. A graduate of the Hellenic Air Force Academy, Spiliotopoulos also holds degrees in law and philosophy. From 1980 he was an Adjutant to the President of the Hellenic Republic Konstantinos Karamanlis and in 1985 he resigned from the air force. He is a member of the New Democracy party and has been a member of parliament since 1989. From 1992–93, he served as Deputy Minister of National Defense. On August 7, 2007, he announced that he would not participate in the 2007 election.

Preceded by Yiannos Papantoniou	Minister for National Defense; 10 March 2004– 15 February 2006	Succeeded by Vangelis Meimarakis
