= Antonis Samaras =

Prime Minister of Greece (2012–2015)

- Αντώνης Σαμαράς
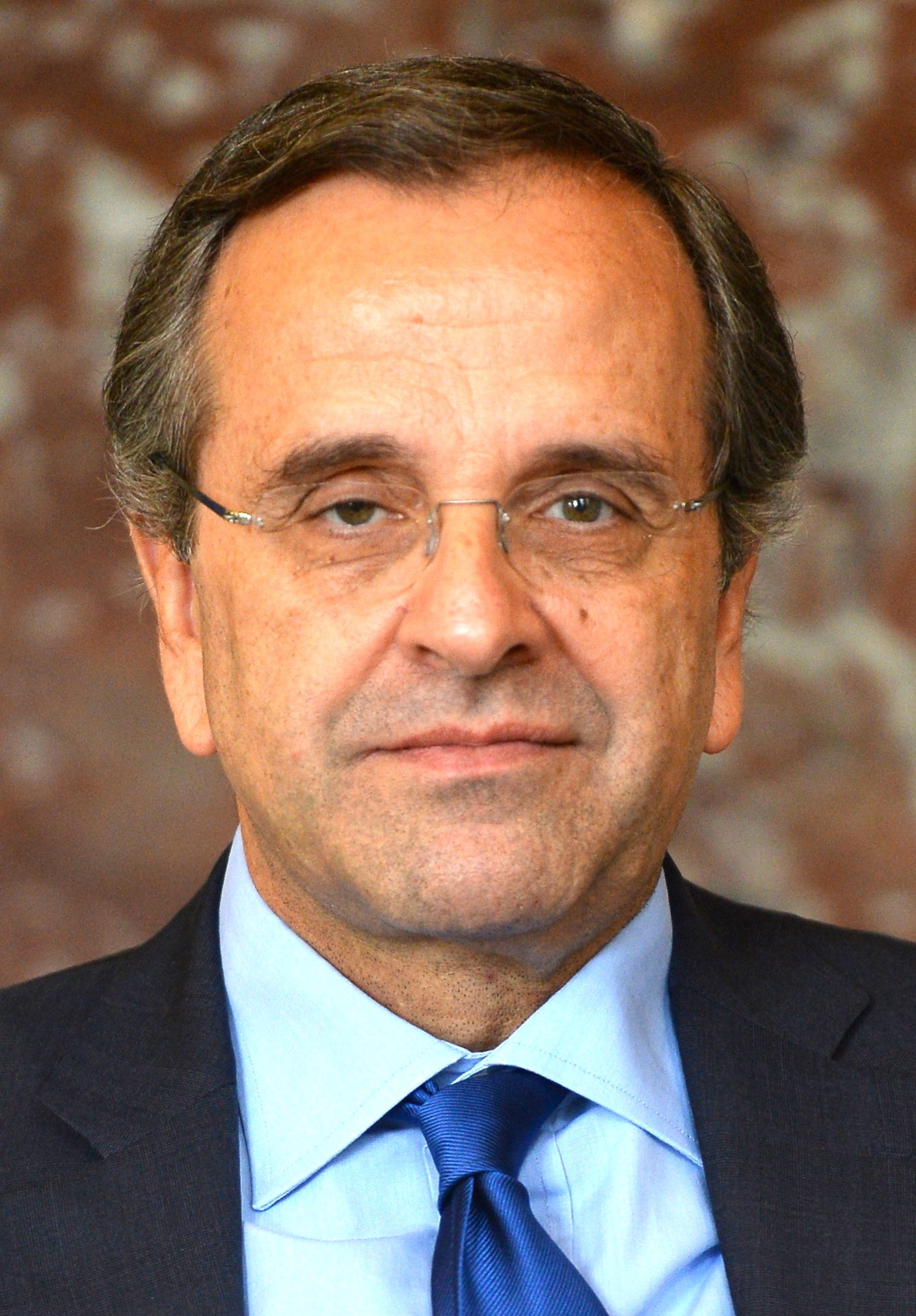
- Samaras in 2014

Prime Minister of Greece
- In office 20 June 2012 – 26 January 2015
- President: Karolos Papoulias
- Deputy: Evangelos Venizelos (Note: Venizelos was Deputy Prime Minister from 2013 to 2015.)
- Preceded by: Panayiotis Pikrammenos (caretaker)
- Succeeded by: Alexis Tsipras
Other political offices
Leader of the Opposition
In office 26 January 2015 – 5 July 2015
Prime Minister	Alexis Tsipras
Preceded by	Alexis Tsipras
Succeeded by	Vangelis Meimarakis
In office 30 November 2009 – 16 May 2012 (Note: While Samaras’s party participated in the government of Lucas Papademos, Samaras remained Leader of the Opposition because he himself was not a member of the government.)
Prime Minister	George Papandreou; Lucas Papademos
Preceded by	Kostas Karamanlis
Succeeded by	Alexis Tsipras (June 2012)
President of New Democracy
In office 30 November 2009 – 5 July 2015
Deputy	Stavros Dimas; Dimitris Avramopoulos
Preceded by	Kostas Karamanlis
Succeeded by	Vangelis Meimarakis (interim)
Minister of Culture
In office 8 January 2009 – 6 October 2009
Prime Minister	Kostas Karamanlis
Preceded by	Michalis Liapis
Succeeded by	Pavlos Geroulanos (Culture and Tourism)
Minister for Foreign Affairs
In office 11 April 1990 – 13 April 1992
Prime Minister	Konstantinos Mitsotakis
Preceded by	Georgios Papoulias
Succeeded by	Konstantinos Mitsotakis
In office 23 November 1989 – 16 February 1990
Prime Minister	Xenophon Zolotas
Preceded by	Georgios Papoulias
Succeeded by	Georgios Papoulias
Minister of Finance
In office 2 July 1989 – 12 October 1989
Prime Minister	Tzannis Tzannetakis
Preceded by	Dimitris Tsovolas
Succeeded by	Georgios Agapitos
Member of the European Parliament
In office 20 July 2004 – 25 September 2007
Constituency	Greece

Member of the Hellenic Parliament
- Incumbent
- Assumed office 16 September 2007
- Constituency: Messenia
- In office 20 November 1977 – 24 August 1996
- Constituency: Messenia

Personal details
- Born: 23 May 1951 (age 75) Athens, Greece
- Party: Independent (2024–present)
- Other political affiliations: Political Spring (1993–2004); New Democracy (1977–1992, 2004–2024)
- Spouse: Georgia Kretikou (m. 1990)
- Children: 2
- Relatives: Emmanouil Benakis (great-great-grandfather); Penelope Delta (great-grandmother)
- Education: Amherst College (BA); Harvard University (MBA)
- Profession: Politician; Economist

Antonis Samaras (Greek: Αντώνης Σαμαράς, pronounced [anˈdonis samaˈɾas]; born 23 May 1951) is a Greek politician who served as Prime Minister of Greece from 2012 to 2015. A member of the New Democracy party, he was its president from 2009 until 2015. He also founded the Political Spring party, which he led as president from 1993 to 2004, when he returned to New Democracy. He has been Member of the Greek Parliament (MP) for Messenia since 2007, having previously served at the same role from 1977 to 1996. He was also a Member of the European Parliament for Greece from 2004 to 2007. Samaras started his national political career as Minister of Finance in 1989; he served as Minister of Foreign Affairs from 1989 to 1992 (with a brief interruption in 1990) and Minister of Culture in 2009. Samaras was expelled from the ruling party in November 2024.

In September 1993, two New Democracy MPs defected from the parliamentary group, aligning with Samaras's party, causing Konstantinos Mitsotakis's government to lose its parliamentary majority and resign, triggering new elections. Samaras's role in the government's fall led to a complete rift between the two politicians, Mitsotakis and Samaras. In spite of this, he rejoined the party in 2004 and was elected to its leadership in a closely fought intra-party election in late 2009. He was the seventh party leader since it was founded in 1974.

In the years that followed, he remained a member of parliament representing the region of Messenia, until November 2024 when he was again expelled from the party's parliamentary group and from New Democracy, due to his criticism of the foreign policy of the government of Kyriakos Mitsotakis.

== Early life and education ==
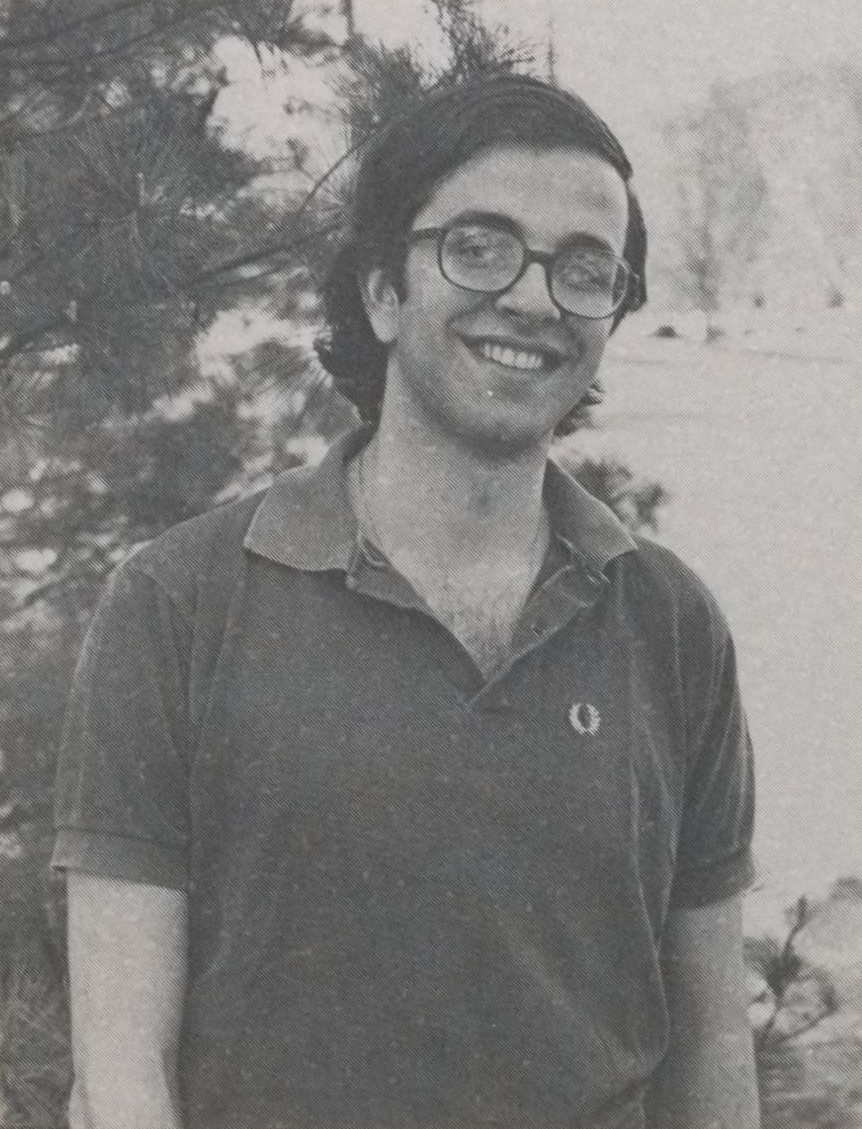
Samaras in the Amherst College yearbook, 1974

Born in Athens, Samaras is the son of Konstantinos Samaras (a professor of cardiology) and Lena (née Zannas, a maternal granddaughter of author Penelope Delta). His brother, Alexander, is an architect. His paternal uncle, George Samaras, was a long-standing Member of Parliament for Messinia in the 1950s and 1960s.

Samaras grew up among well-connected families of Athens. At the age of 17, he won the Greek Teen Tennis Championship. He attended school in the Athens College (founded by his maternal great-grandfather, Stefanos Delta, and his great-great-grandfather, Emmanouil Benakis) and graduated from Amherst College in 1974 with a degree in economics, and then from Harvard University in 1976 with an MBA.

Samaras and former Prime Minister George Papandreou were dormitory roommates during their student years at Amherst College, but became bitter political rivals. He is married and has a daughter and a son. His daughter Lena, a civil engineer, died from a cardiac arrest and a seizure on 7 August 2025 at the age of 34.

== Political career ==
=== Early political involvement ===
Samaras has been elected as a member of parliament, initially for Messinia, from 1977 onward. In 1989 he became minister of finance, later advancing to become the minister of foreign affairs in the New Democracy government of Prime Minister Konstantinos Mitsotakis (1990–1993), from which post he caused the Macedonia naming dispute to ignite. In a meeting of the Greek political leaders under the president of the republic on the naming dispute on 13 April 1992, Samaras presented his own conditions for the solution of the crisis. These were rejected by both the president of the republic, Konstantinos Karamanlis, as well as the prime minister, Konstantinos Mitsotakis. Samaras was subsequently removed from Minister of Foreign Affairs.

=== Foundation of Political Spring ===
After being removed from his post, Samaras founded his own party, Political Spring (Greek: Πολιτική Άνοιξη, romanised as Politiki Anoixi), located politically to the right of New Democracy. The defection of one Member of Parliament from New Democracy to Samaras's party caused the government's fall from power in 1993.

Political Spring gained 4.9% of the vote in the 1993 general election, earning ten seats in the Hellenic Parliament. It gained 8.7% in the 1994 European Parliament election, earning two seats. Its decline began in the 1996 general election, when it gained 2.94 per cent, just below the 3 per cent threshold necessary to enter parliament. It participated in the 1999 European Parliament election, but only got 2.3%, which was not enough to elect MEPs.

=== Return to New Democracy ===
Political Spring did not participate in the 2000 general election; Samaras publicly supported the New Democracy party. Before the 2004 general election, Samaras dissolved his party, rejoined New Democracy and he was elected a Member of the European Parliament (MEP) in the 2004 European elections.

In the 2007 general election he was elected to the Hellenic Parliament for Messinia and consequently resigned from the European Parliament. He was succeeded by Margaritis Schinas. In January 2009 he was appointed Minister of Culture following a government reshuffle. In this capacity he inaugurated the new Acropolis Museum in July 2009. He was reelected in Messenia in 2009.

After New Democracy resoundingly lost the 2009 legislative election, Kostas Karamanlis resigned as head of the party, prompting a leadership race, and Samaras ran for the post. Early polls showed he was running neck-and-neck with the perceived initial favorite Dora Bakoyanni, the former Foreign Minister and former Athens mayor. Shortly thereafter, another leadership candidate, former Minister Dimitris Avramopoulos, announced he was resigning his candidacy and would instead support Samaras. In a break with previous practice, an extraordinary party congress resolved that the new leader would be elected by party members in a countrywide ballot. Samaras's candidacy soared in opinion polls and finished the race as a favorite.

=== Leader of the Opposition (2009–2012, 2015) ===
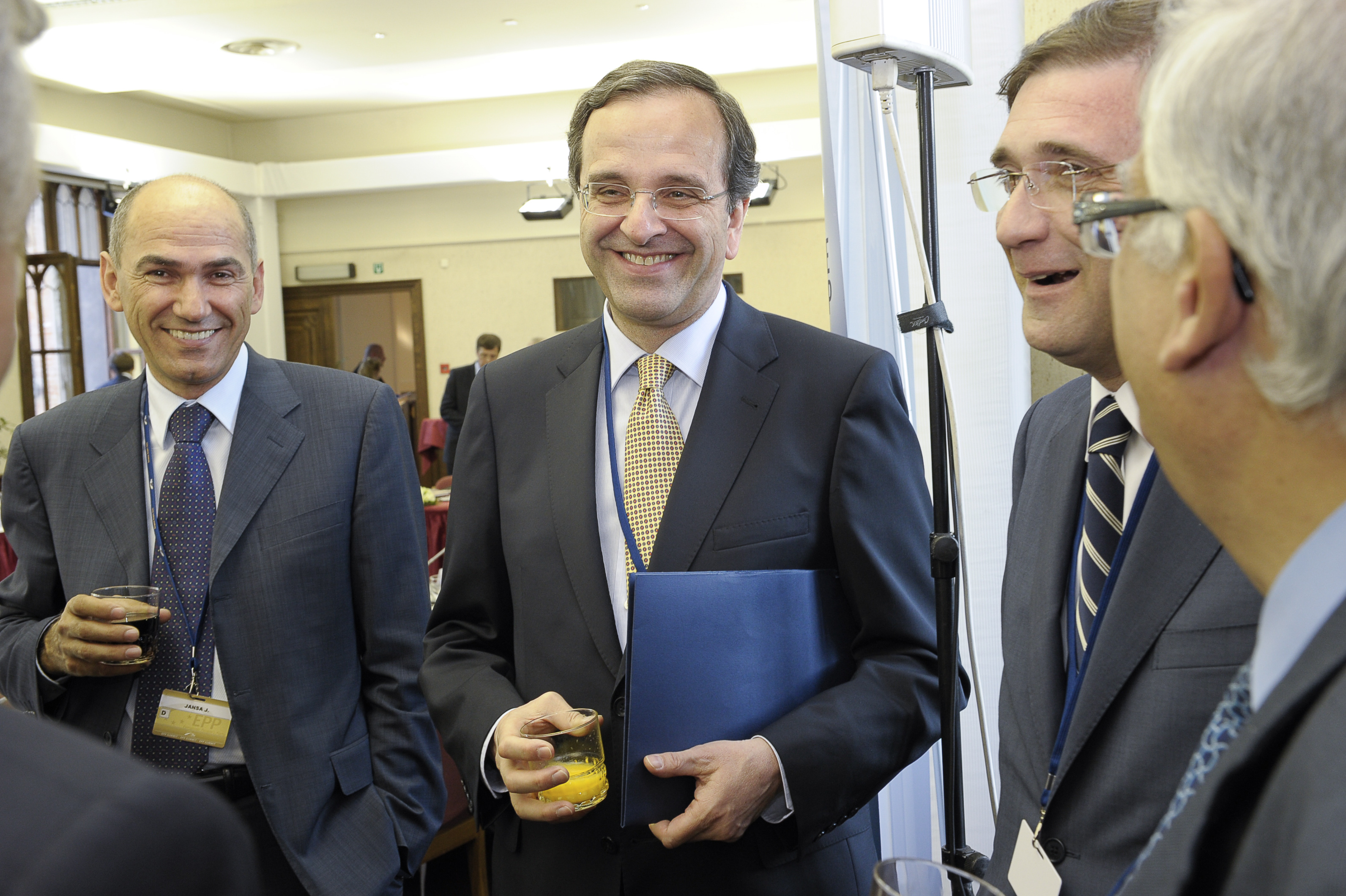
Samaras at a summit of the European People's Party in 2010

In the early morning hours of 30 November 2009, Samaras was elected the new President of New Democracy. Following early results showing Samaras in a comfortable lead, Bakoyanni, his main rival, conceded defeat and called Samaras to congratulate him. He accepted his election with a speech at the party headquarters, and pledged to carry out a broad ideological and organizational reform, aspiring to regain majority status. He was later instrumental in the expulsion of Bakoyanni (2010) for defying the party line and voting for an austerity measure required for European Union-International Monetary Fund backed lending.

Prime Minister George Papandreou announced his government's plans on 31 October to hold a referendum on the acceptance of the terms of a Eurozone bailout deal. The referendum was to be held in December 2011 or January 2012. Following vehement opposition from both within and outside the country, Papandreou however scrapped the plan a few days later on 3 November.

On 5 November, Papandreou's government only narrowly won a confidence vote in the Greek Parliament, and he called for immediate elections. The next day, Papandreou met with opposition leaders trying to reach an agreement on the formation of an interim national unity government. However, Samaras only gave in after Papandreou agreed to step aside, allowing the EU bailout to proceed and paving the way for elections on 19 February 2012.

After several days of intense negotiations, the two major parties along with the Popular Orthodox Rally agreed to form a grand coalition headed by former Vice President of the European Central Bank Lucas Papademos. On 10 November, George Papandreou formally resigned as Prime Minister of Greece. The new coalition cabinet and Prime Minister Lucas Papademos were formally sworn in on 11 November 2011.

=== Prime Minister of Greece (2012–2015) ===
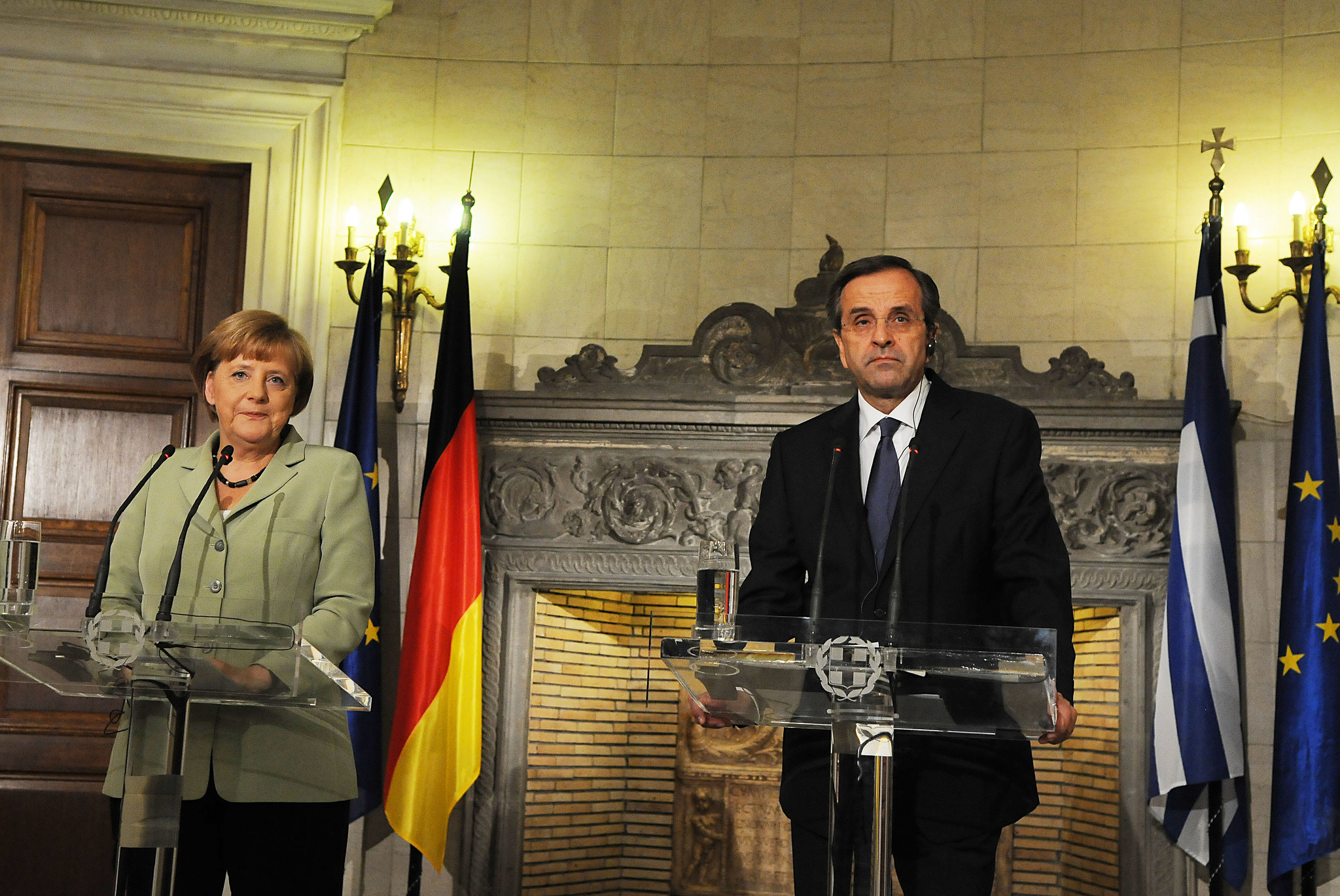
Samaras with Angela Merkel in Athens

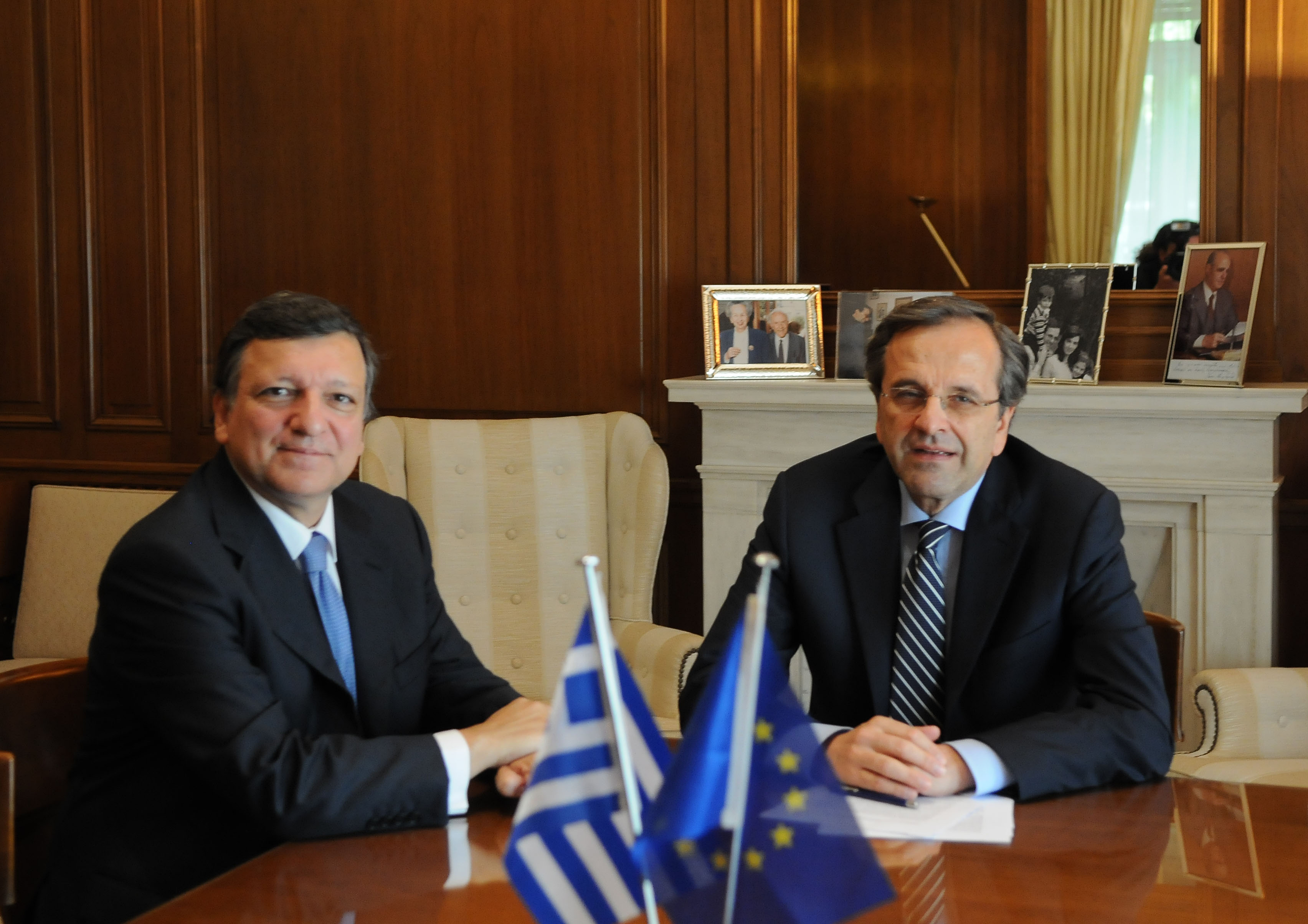
Samaras with José Manuel Barroso in Athens

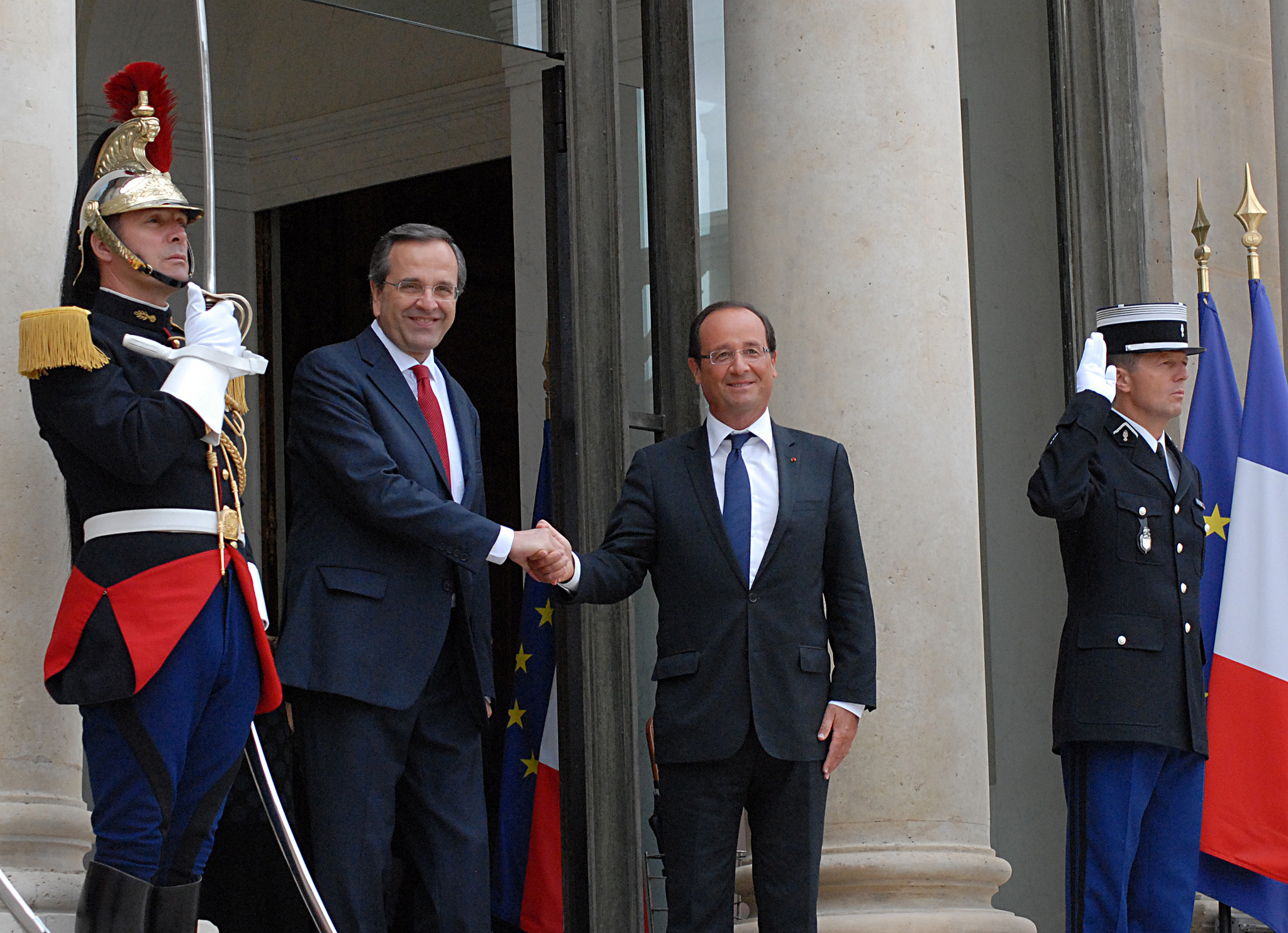
Samaras with François Hollande in Paris

Following the May 2012 general election in which the New Democracy party became the largest party in the Hellenic Parliament, Samaras was asked by Greek President Karolos Papoulias to try to form a government. However, after a day of negotiations with the other parties, Samaras officially announced he was giving up the mandate to form a government. The task passed to Alexis Tsipras, Leader of Syriza, the second largest party, who was also unable to form a government. After the Panhellenic Socialist Movement (PASOK) also failed to negotiate a successful agreement to form a government, emergency talks with the president of Greece ended with a new election being called while the outgoing chairman of the Council of State Panayiotis Pikrammenos was appointed as Prime Minister of Greece in a caretaker government composed of independent technocrats.

Voters once again took to the polls in the widely watched June 2012 election. The New Democracy party came out on top in a stronger position with 129 seats, compared to 108 in the May election. On 20 June 2012, Samaras successfully formed a coalition with the PASOK (now led by former Finance Minister Evangelos Venizelos) and the Democratic Left (DIMAR). The new government had a majority of 28 (which was later reduced to 18), with Syriza, the Independent Greeks (ANEL), Golden Dawn (XA) and the Communist Party (KKE) comprising the opposition. The PASOK and DIMAR chose to take a limited role in Samaras's Cabinet, being represented by party officials and independent technocrats instead of MPs.

The Democratic Left left the coalition on 21 June 2013 in protest at the closure of the nation's public broadcaster Hellenic Broadcasting Corporation (ERT), leaving Samaras with a slim majority of 153 ND and PASOK MPs combined. The two remaining parties proceeded to negotiate a cabinet reshuffle that resulted in a significantly expanded role for PASOK in the new coalition government. A further reshuffle followed the 2014 European Parliament election.

Samaras implemented a series of reforms and austerity measures with the aim of reducing government budget deficits and making the Greek economy competitive. In 2013 he passed reform bills approving the layoff of 15,000 public employees, among them high school teachers, school guards and municipal policemen. At the same time, he cut value-added tax (VAT) in restaurants to 13 percent from 23 percent. He also passed a bill instituting the Single Property Tax and the auction of houses. The Minister of Administrative Reform and e-Governance Kyriakos Mitsotakis implemented an evaluation process on the public sector to locate surplus staff members.

Greece achieved a primary government budget surplus in 2013. In April 2014, Greece returned to the global bond market as it successfully sold €3 billion worth of five-year government bonds at a yield of 4.95%. Greece's credit rating was upgraded by Fitch from B− to B. Greece returned to growth after six years of economic decline in the second quarter of 2014, and was the eurozone's fastest-growing economy in the third quarter. Tourism also grew. It is estimated that throughout 2013 Greece welcomed over 17.93 million tourists, an increase of 10% compared to 2012. More than 22 million tourists visited Greece in 2014. On healthcare, Minister for Health Adonis Georgiadis gave complete free pharmaceutical coverage to more than 2.000.000 uninsured citizens, with the cost being set at 340 million euros.

On 9 December 2014, Samaras announced the candidacy of New Democracy politician Stavros Dimas for the position of President of Greece. Dimas failed to secure the required majority of MPs of the Hellenic Parliament in the first three rounds of voting. According to the provisions of the Constitution of Greece, snap elections were held on 25 January 2015, which were won by Syriza. Tsipras succeeded Samaras, who resigned as Leader of New Democracy on 5 July 2015, following the overwhelming victory of the "No" vote in the bailout referendum, naming Vangelis Meimarakis as transitional leader. Samaras had been backing a "Yes" vote, together with his party, before the referendum.

=== Post-premiership ===
In 2023, Samaras made controversial statements against the LGBTQI+ community, suggesting that LGBTQI+ rights have no place in Europe. He also disputed gender identity, arguing that only biological gender is real, and made xenophobic remarks against migrants, claiming that "they are tearing Europe apart". These remarks drew public backlash, with the Minister of State, Akis Skertsos, failing to condemn them, stating that as a former Prime Minister, he has every right to express himself however he sees fit.

On 16 November 2024, Samaras was expelled from New Democracy after he criticised foreign minister Giorgos Gerapetritis and his handling of negotiations with Turkey as well as the handling of previous issues by the government of Kyriakos Mitsotakis in an interview with the newspaper To Vima. In response Samaras accused Mitsotakis of "arrogance and loss of nerve" in removing him. Also stated that "no one can force me to sacrifice my conscience", accused the prime minister of being cut off from the ND base and stressed that "the judge of all of us will be the people and history".

== See also ==
- List of international prime ministerial trips made by Antonis Samaras

== Notes ==
Political offices
Preceded by Dimitris Tsovolas	Minister of Finance; 1989	Succeeded by Georgios Agapitos
Preceded by Georgios Papoulias	Minister for Foreign Affairs; 1989–1990	Succeeded by Georgios Papoulias
Preceded by Georgios Papoulias	Minister for Foreign Affairs; 1990–1992	Succeeded by Konstantinos Mitsotakis
Preceded by Michalis Liapis	Minister of Culture; 2009	Succeeded by Pavlos Geroulanos as Minister of Culture and Tourism
Preceded by Kostas Karamanlis	Leader of the Opposition; 2009–2012	Succeeded by Alexis Tsipras
Preceded by Panayiotis Pikrammenos	Prime Minister of Greece; 2012–2015	Succeeded by Alexis Tsipras
Preceded by Alexis Tsipras	Leader of the Opposition; 2015	Succeeded by Vangelis Meimarakis; Acting
Party political offices
Position established	President of Political Spring; 1993–2004	Position abolished
Preceded by Kostas Karamanlis	President of New Democracy; 2009–2015	Succeeded by Vangelis Meimarakis; Acting
Order of precedence
Preceded by Panayiotis Pikrammenos as former Prime Minister	Order of precedence of Greece; Former Prime Minister	Succeeded by Alexis Tsipras as former Prime Minister
