= Cabinet of George Papandreou =

Greek government (2009–2011)

- Cabinet of Greece

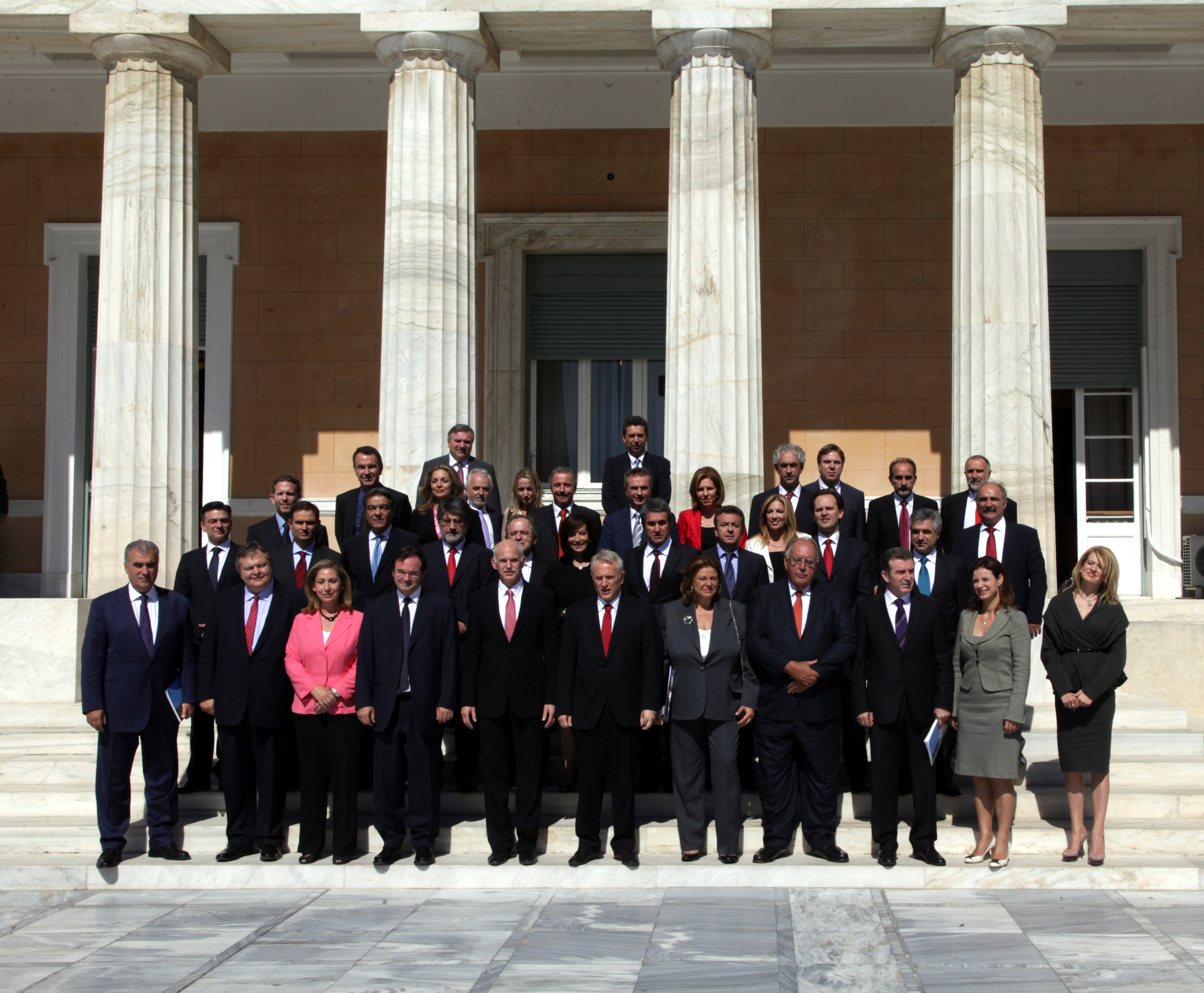
- Initial cabinet of George Papandreou outside the Hellenic Parliament on October 7, 2009
- Date formed: 7 October 2009
- Date dissolved: 11 November 2011

People and organisations
- Head of state: Karolos Papoulias
- Head of government: George Papandreou
- Deputy head of government: Theodoros Pangalos (until 17/06/11); Evangelos Venizelos (from 17/06/11)
- Member parties: Panhellenic Socialist Movement (PASOK)
- Status in legislature: Majority government
- Opposition parties: New Democracy; Communist Party of Greece (KKE); Popular Orthodox Rally (LAOS); Coalition of the Radical Left (SYRIZA)
- Opposition leader: Kostas Karamanlis (until 30/11/09); Antonis Samaras (from 30/11/09)

History
- Election: 2009 Greek legislative election
- Legislature term: 13th (2009–2012)
- Predecessor: Kostas Karamanlis II cabinet
- Successor: Lucas Papademos cabinet

Following the 4 October 2009 general elections in Greece, George Papandreou, the leader of PASOK, formed a government, which was sworn in on 7 October. A major cabinet reshuffle was made in September 2010. The cabinet was succeeded by the Lucas Papademos's Coalition Cabinet.

== The 2009 cabinet ==
The cabinet had 36 members, 14 ministers and 22 deputy ministers, a reduction in the size of government as promised by the PA.SO.K. leader during his campaign for the country’s parliamentary elections. Twenty-four of the new members of the government had no previous ministerial experience. Nine of the members were women, a very large proportion by Greek standards, while five of them were named to head ministries among the 14 portfolios. Papandreou appointed himself foreign minister, a portfolio he held in a previous Pasok government.

=== Changes in government structure ===
The new cabinet featured less ministries than usual in the past (four less than the previous cabinet), and significant changes in several of them:

- the post of a Vice-President of the Government has been re-introduced and given a coordinating role over the Government Council for Foreign Affairs and Defense (KYSEA) and the committee on Economic and Social Policy.
- the united Ministry for Economy and Finance has been split up again, with the Ministry for Economy also taking over the role of the Ministry for Development and most functions of the Ministry for Mercantile Marine.
- the regional ministries, namely the Ministry for Macedonia–Thrace and the Ministry for the Aegean and Island Policy, were abolished. Instead, a Deputy Minister of the Ministry of Finance, Competitiveness and Mercantile Marine resided in Macedonia.
- the Ministry for Transport and Communications was merged with the Public Works sector of the Ministry for the Environment, Physical Planning and Public Works, while a dedicated Ministry for the Environment, Energy and Climate Change is created.
- the General Secretariats of Public Order (supervising the Hellenic Police and Hellenic Fire Service) and of Civil Defence of the Ministry for the Interior, together with the Hellenic Coast Guard (previously under the purview of the Ministry for Mercantile Marine) are joined into the new Ministry for the Protection of the Citizen. In essence, it forms a revival, in a revised form, of the old Ministry for Public Order.
- the ministries of Culture and Tourism were merged.

=== Ministers ===
Office	Incumbent	Party	Dates
Prime Minister	George Papandreou	Panhellenic Socialist Movement	6 October 2009
Deputy Prime Minister	Theodoros Pangalos	Panhellenic Socialist Movement	7 October 2009
Minister for the Interior, Decentralization and Electronic Governance	Giannis Ragousis	Panhellenic Socialist Movement	7 October 2009
Minister for Finance	Giorgos Papakonstantinou	Panhellenic Socialist Movement	7 October 2009
Minister for Foreign Affairs	George Papandreou	Panhellenic Socialist Movement	7 October 2009
Minister for National Defence	Evangelos Venizelos	Panhellenic Socialist Movement	7 October 2009
Minister for the Economy, Competitiveness and Shipping	Louka Katseli	Panhellenic Socialist Movement	7 October 2009
Minister for the Environment, Energy and Climate Change	Tina Birbili	Panhellenic Socialist Movement	7 October 2009
Minister for Education, Lifelong Learning and Religious Affairs	Anna Diamantopoulou	Panhellenic Socialist Movement	7 October 2009
Minister for Infrastructure, Transport and Networks	Dimitris Reppas	Panhellenic Socialist Movement	7 October 2009
Minister for Labour and Social Security	Andreas Loverdos	Panhellenic Socialist Movement	7 October 2009
Minister for Health and Social Solidarity	Mariliza Xenogiannakopoulou	Panhellenic Socialist Movement	7 October 2009
Minister for Rural Development and Food	Katerina Batzeli	Panhellenic Socialist Movement	7 October 2009
Minister for Justice, Transparency and Human Rights	Haris Kastanidis	Panhellenic Socialist Movement	7 October 2009
Minister for Citizen Protection	Michalis Chrisochoidis	Panhellenic Socialist Movement	7 October 2009
Minister for Culture and Tourism	Pavlos Geroulanos	Panhellenic Socialist Movement	7 October 2009
Minister of State to the Prime Minister	Haris Pamboukis	Panhellenic Socialist Movement	7 October 2009
Alternate Minister for Foreign Affairs	Dimitris Droutsas	Panhellenic Socialist Movement	7 October 2009
Alternate Minister for National Defence	Panos Beglitis	Panhellenic Socialist Movement	7 October 2009

== The 2010 cabinet ==
Prime Minister Papandreou's second cabinet was sworn in on 7 September 2010, after a major cabinet reshuffle with 48 cabinet members comprising the new government, of which seven members were alternate ministers – up from two in the previous Cabinet – and 24 deputy ministers. The majority of Cabinet members are M.P.s from the ruling PA.SO.K. party. The Ministry of Maritime Affairs, Islands and Fisheries - essentially the re-established Merchant Marine ministry - was established.

=== Ministers ===
Office	Incumbent	Party	Dates
Prime Minister	George Papandreou	Panhellenic Socialist Movement	6 October 2009
Deputy Prime Minister of Greece	Theodoros Pangalos	Panhellenic Socialist Movement	7 October 2009
Minister for the Interior, Decentralization and Electronic Governance	Giannis Ragousis	Panhellenic Socialist Movement	7 October 2009
Minister for Finance	Giorgos Papakonstantinou	Panhellenic Socialist Movement	7 October 2009
Minister for Foreign Affairs	Dimitris Droutsas	Panhellenic Socialist Movement	7 September 2010
Minister for National Defence	Evangelos Venizelos	Panhellenic Socialist Movement	7 October 2009
Minister for Regional Development and Competitiveness	Michalis Chrisochoidis	Panhellenic Socialist Movement	7 September 2010
Minister for Maritime Affairs, Islands and Fisheries	Giannis Diamantidis	Panhellenic Socialist Movement	7 September 2010
Minister for the Environment, Energy and Climate Change	Tina Birbili	Panhellenic Socialist Movement	7 October 2009
Minister for Education, Lifelong Learning and Religious Affairs	Anna Diamantopoulou	Panhellenic Socialist Movement	7 October 2009
Minister for Infrastructure, Transport and Networks	Dimitris Reppas	Panhellenic Socialist Movement	7 October 2009
Minister for Labour and Social Security	Louka Katseli	Panhellenic Socialist Movement	7 September 2010
Minister for Health and Social Solidarity	Andreas Loverdos	Panhellenic Socialist Movement	7 September 2010
Minister for Rural Development and Food	Kostas Skandalidis	Panhellenic Socialist Movement	7 September 2010
Minister for Justice, Transparency and Human Rights	Haris Kastanidis	Panhellenic Socialist Movement	7 October 2009
Minister for Citizen Protection	Christos Papoutsis	Panhellenic Socialist Movement	7 September 2010
Minister for Culture and Tourism	Pavlos Geroulanos	Panhellenic Socialist Movement	7 October 2009
Minister of State to the Prime Minister	Haris Pamboukis	Panhellenic Socialist Movement	7 October 2009
Deputy Minister to the Prime Minister and Government Spokesman	George Petalotis	Panhellenic Socialist Movement	7 September 2010
Alternate Minister for Foreign Affairs with responsibility for the European Union	Mariliza Xenogiannakopoulou	Panhellenic Socialist Movement	7 September 2010
Alternate Minister for National Defence	Panagiotis Beglitis	Panhellenic Socialist Movement	14 October 2009
Alternate Minister for Regional Development and Competitiveness	Sokratis Xynidis	Panhellenic Socialist Movement	7 September 2010
Alternate Minister for the Environment, Energy and Climate Change	Nikolaos Sifounakis	Panhellenic Socialist Movement	7 September 2010
Alternate Minister for Education, Lifelong Learning and Religious Affairs	Fofi Gennimata	Panhellenic Socialist Movement	7 September 2010
Alternate Minister for Labour and Social Security	Giorgos Koutroumanis	Panhellenic Socialist Movement	7 September 2010
Alternate Minister for Labour and Social Security responsible for the Medias	Tilemachos Chytiris	Panhellenic Socialist Movement	7 September 2010

== The 2011 cabinet ==
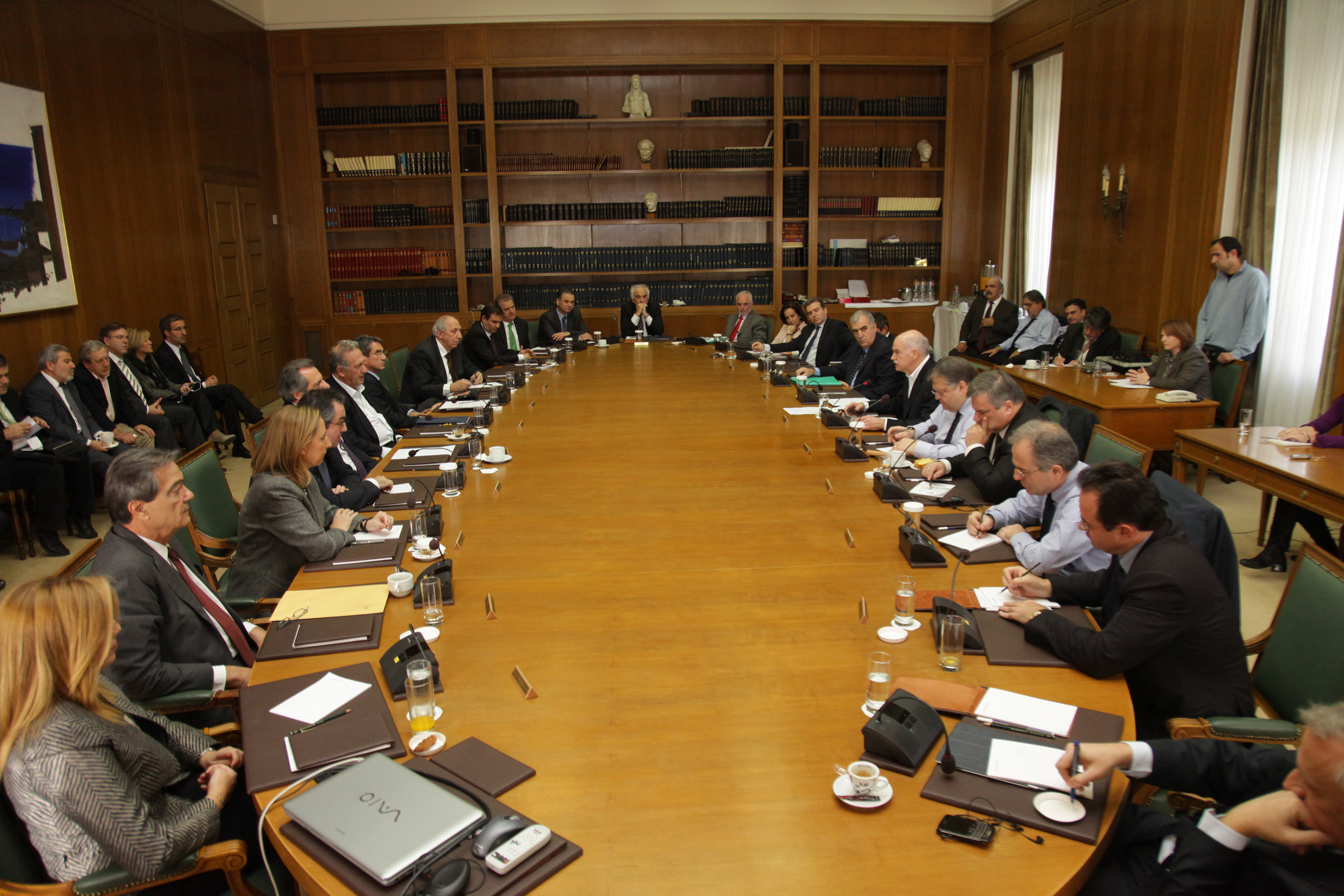
Cabinet meeting, 8 November 2011

Prime Minister George A. Papandreou announced a Cabinet reshuffle on 15 June 2011 amidst the worsening Greek debt crisis and mounting protests. The new cabinet was announced and sworn in on 17 June. It features 41 members, seven down from the 2010 cabinet, and a new ministry, that of Administrative Reform, split off from the Interior Ministry. The Ministry for Maritime Affairs, Islands and Fisheries, established in 2010, was dissolved and merged with the Ministry for Regional Development and Competitiveness.

The new cabinet received a vote of confidence on 21 June 2011, with 155 (51.7%) votes in favour (all from PA.SO.K. members), 143 (47.7%) against, and two (0.7%) abstentions.

=== Ministers ===
Office	Incumbent	Party	Dates
Prime Minister	George Papandreou	Panhellenic Socialist Movement	6 October 2009
Deputy Prime Minister	Theodoros Pangalos	Panhellenic Socialist Movement	7 October 2009
Deputy Prime Minister and Minister for Finance	Evangelos Venizelos	Panhellenic Socialist Movement	17 June 2011
Minister for the Interior	Haris Kastanidis	Panhellenic Socialist Movement	17 June 2011
Minister for Administrative Reform and e-Governance	Dimitris Reppas	Panhellenic Socialist Movement	17 June 2011
Minister for Foreign Affairs	Stavros Lambrinidis	Panhellenic Socialist Movement	17 June 2011
Minister for National Defence	Panos Beglitis	Panhellenic Socialist Movement	17 June 2011
Minister for Development, Competitiveness and Shipping	Michalis Chrisochoidis	Panhellenic Socialist Movement	7 September 2010
Minister for the Environment, Energy and Climate Change	Giorgos Papakonstantinou	Panhellenic Socialist Movement	17 June 2011
Minister for Education, Lifelong Learning and Religious Affairs	Anna Diamantopoulou	Panhellenic Socialist Movement	7 October 2009
Minister for Infrastructure, Transport and Networks	Giannis Ragousis	Panhellenic Socialist Movement	17 June 2011
Minister for Labour and Social Security	Giorgos Koutroumanis	Panhellenic Socialist Movement	17 June 2011
Minister for Health and Social Solidarity	Andreas Loverdos	Panhellenic Socialist Movement	7 September 2010
Minister for Rural Development and Food	Kostas Skandalidis	Panhellenic Socialist Movement	7 September 2010
Minister for Justice, Transparency and Human Rights	Miltiadis Papaioannou	Panhellenic Socialist Movement	17 June 2011
Minister for Citizen Protection	Christos Papoutsis	Panhellenic Socialist Movement	7 September 2010
Minister for Culture and Tourism	Pavlos Geroulanos	Panhellenic Socialist Movement	7 October 2009
Minister of State and Government Spokesman	Elias Mossialos	Panhellenic Socialist Movement	17 June 2011
Alternate Minister of Finance	Filippos Sachinidis	Panhellenic Socialist Movement	17 June 2011
Alternate Minister of Finance	Pantelis Oikonomou	Panhellenic Socialist Movement	17 June 2011
Alternate Minister for Foreign Affairs	Mariliza Xenogiannakopoulou	Panhellenic Socialist Movement	7 September 2010
Alternate Minister for Development, Competitiveness and Shipping	Sokratis Xynidis	Panhellenic Socialist Movement	7 September 2010
Alternate Minister for Development, Competitiveness and Shipping	Haris Pamboukis	Panhellenic Socialist Movement	27 June 2011
Alternate Minister for the Environment, Energy and Climate Change	Nikolaos Sifounakis	Panhellenic Socialist Movement	7 September 2010
Alternate Minister for Education, Lifelong Learning and Religious Affairs	Fofi Gennimata	Panhellenic Socialist Movement	7 September 2010

Prime Minister George A. Papandreou also announced the formation of a Government Committee (Κυβερνητική Επιτροπή) composed of leading ministers:

- Dimitris Reppas
- Haris Kastanidis
- Evangelos Venizelos
- Michalis Chrysohoidis
- Giorgos Papakonstantinou
- Anna Diamantopoulou
- Giannis Ragousis
- Andreas Loverdos
- Kostas Skandalidis
- Christos Papoutsis

== See also ==
- Cabinet of Greece
- List of cabinets of Greece
