= Cabinet of Lucas Papademos =

- Cabinet of Greece

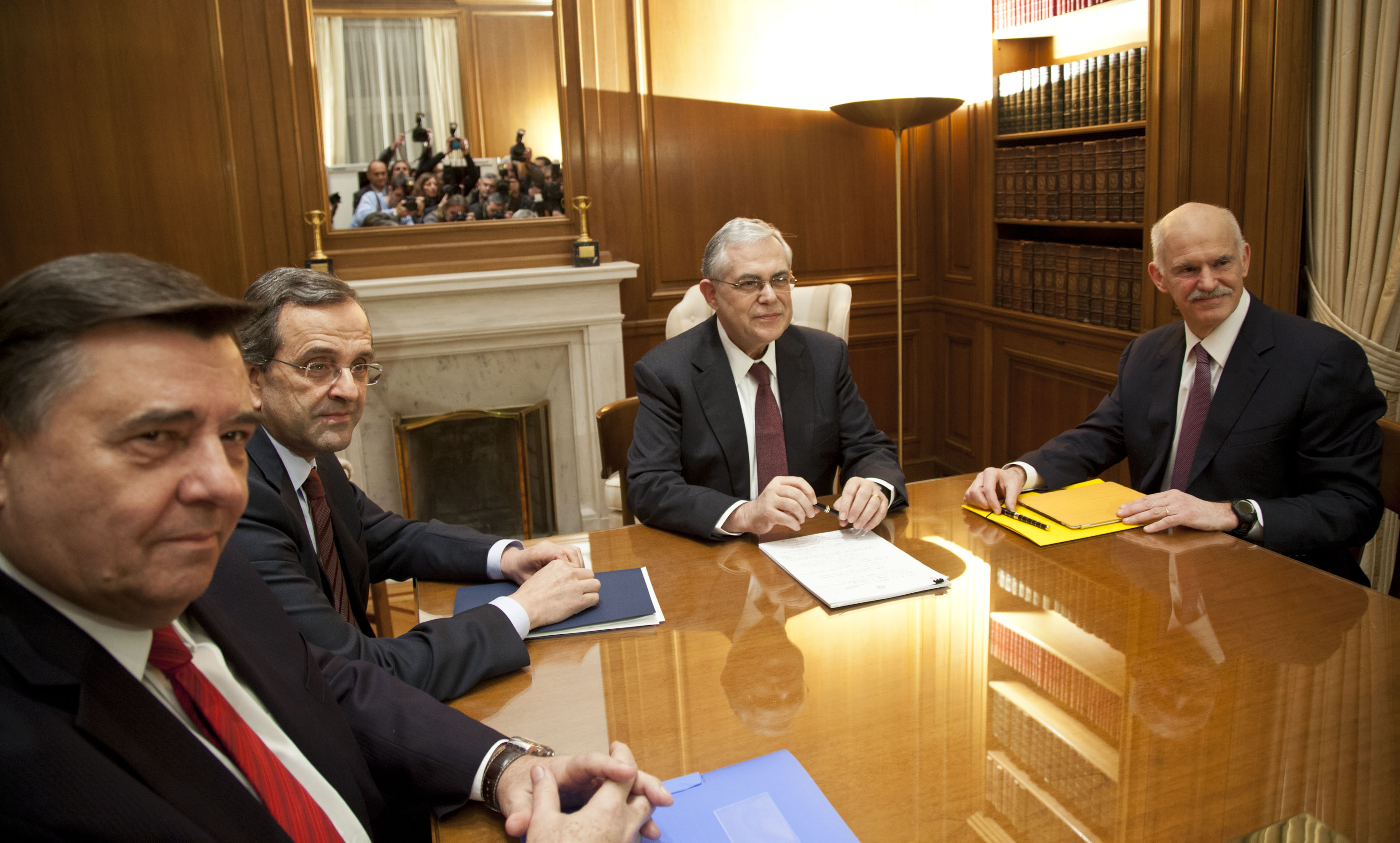
- Prime minister Papademos (c.) and party leaders George A. Papandreou (PASOK) (r.), Antonis Samaras (ND) (l.), Giorgos Karatzaferis (LAOS) (fl.)
- Date formed: 11 November 2011
- Date dissolved: 17 May 2012

People and organisations
- Head of state: Karolos Papoulias
- Head of government: Lucas Papademos
- Deputy head of government: Theodoros Pangalos; Evangelos Venizelos (until 21 March 2012)
- Member parties: New Democracy, PASOK, LAOS (until 10/02/12)
- Status in legislature: Ecumenical government
- Opposition parties: Communist Party of Greece (KKE); Popular Orthodox Rally (LAOS) (from 10/02/12); Coalition of the Radical Left (SYRIZA); Democratic Left (DIMAR) (from 22/03/12); Independent Greeks (ANEL) (from 03/04/12)

History
- Election: Without election
- Legislature term: 13th (2009–2012)
- Predecessor: Cabinet of George Papandreou
- Successor: Pikrammenos Caretaker Cabinet

The Cabinet of Lucas Papademos succeeded the cabinet of George Papandreou, as an interim three-party coalition cabinet, leading a coalition government formed by the Panhellenic Socialist Movement (PASOK) party, New Democracy party and Popular Orthodox Rally party, after Papandreou's decision to step down, and allow a provisional coalition government to form with the task to take Greece out of a major political crisis caused by the country's debt crisis. It was the first coalition cabinet in Greece since the 1989–1990 Ecumenical Cabinet of Xenophon Zolotas.

The Prime Minister Lucas Papademos and the Cabinet were formally sworn in on 11 November 2011.

== Government formation process ==
On November 6, Prime Minister George Papandreou met with opposition leaders to try to reach an agreement on the formation of an interim government, after a narrow confidence vote win in parliament. A day earlier, the leader of the opposition New Democracy party Antonis Samaras had rejected the proposal and called for an immediate election. After Papandreou agreed to step aside, however, the two leaders announced their intention to form a national unity government that would allow the EU bailout to proceed and pave the way for elections on 19 February 2012. The Communist Party and the Coalition of the Radical Left Party, refused Papandreou's invitation to join talks on a new unity government. After several days of intense negotiations, the two major parties along with the Popular Orthodox Rally agreed to form a grand coalition headed by former European Central Bank vice-president Lucas Papademos.

On November 10, George Papandreou formally resigned as Prime Minister of Greece, and the new coalition cabinet and Prime Minister Lucas Papademos were formally sworn in on 11 November 2011.

The national unity government's main task was to allow the EU bailout to proceed and to pave the way for elections on 19 February 2012. Papademos, who was not an elected MP, has said his priority will be to keep Greece in the eurozone.

== The cabinet ==
In total, 48 people including the prime minister make up the government, seven more than its immediate predecessor. There are 12 new ministers in its ranks, of which nine have been sworn into government office for the first time, including the new premier. Broadly, most Cabinet members served in the previous government of George Papandreou. Nevertheless, the new coalition government also includes six members hailing from the main opposition New Democracy party.

On 10 February 2012, the Popular Orthodox Rally withdrew from the coalition government after refusing to support the latest austerity deal. The party's only cabinet minister, Makis Voridis, was expelled by Georgios Karatzaferis for supporting the package but retained his portfolio after consultations with the prime minister. A few days later, he joined New Democracy and surrendered his parliamentary seat to LAOS.

A minor cabinet reshuffle was announced in March 2012, after Christos Papoutsis resigned as Minister for Citizen Protection in order to pursue the PASOK leadership. He was replaced by Michalis Chrisochoidis, who was succeeded as development minister by Anna Diamantopoulou. She was replaced in the education portfolio by Georgios Babiniotis, a professor of linguistics and former rector of the University of Athens.

Office	Incumbent	Party	Since
Prime Minister	Lucas Papademos	Independent	11 November 2011
Deputy Prime Minister	Theodoros Pangalos	PASOK	7 October 2009
Minister for Finance	Philippos Sachinidis	PASOK	21 March 2012
Minister for the Interior	Tasos Giannitsis	PASOK	11 November 2011
Minister for Administrative Reform and e-Governance	Dimitris Reppas	PASOK	17 June 2011
Minister for Foreign Affairs	Stavros Dimas	New Democracy	11 November 2011
Minister for National Defence	Dimitris Avramopoulos	New Democracy	11 November 2011
Minister for Development, Competitiveness and Shipping	Anna Diamantopoulou	PASOK	7 March 2012
Minister for the Environment, Energy and Climate Change	Giorgos Papakonstantinou	PASOK	17 June 2011
Minister for Education, Lifelong Learning and Religious Affairs	Georgios Babiniotis	Independent	7 March 2012
Minister for Infrastructure, Transport and Networks	Makis Voridis	Popular Orthodox Rally (until 2012)	11 November 2011
Minister for Infrastructure, Transport and Networks	Makis Voridis	New Democracy (since 2012)	11 November 2011
Minister for Labour and Social Security	Giorgos Koutroumanis	PASOK	17 June 2011
Minister for Health and Social Solidarity	Andreas Loverdos	PASOK	7 September 2010
Minister for Rural Development and Food	Kostas Skandalidis	PASOK	7 September 2010
Minister for Justice, Transparency and Human Rights	Miltiadis Papaioannou	PASOK	17 June 2011
Minister for Citizen Protection	Michalis Chrisochoidis	PASOK	7 March 2012
Minister for Culture and Tourism	Pavlos Geroulanos	PASOK	7 October 2009
Minister of State	Georgios Stavropoulos	Independent	11 November 2011
Minister of State and government spokesman	Pantelis Kapsis	Independent	2 December 2011

== See also ==
- Cabinet of Greece
- List of cabinets of Greece
