= Third cabinet of Costas Simitis =

Third Cabinet of Costas Simitis
- Cabinet of Greece

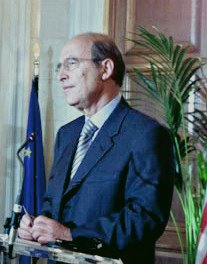
- Simitis during Bill Clinton's visit to Athens.
- Date formed: 13 April 2000
- Date dissolved: 10 March 2004

People and organisations
- Head of state: Konstantinos Stephanopoulos
- Head of government: Costas Simitis
- Member parties: Panhellenic Socialist Movement (PASOK)
- Status in legislature: Majority government
- Opposition parties: New Democracy (ND); Communist Party of Greece (KKE); Synaspismos (SYN)
- Opposition leader: Kostas Karamanlis

History
- Election: 2000 Greek legislative election
- Legislature term: 10th (2000–2004)
- Predecessor: Costas Simitis II cabinet
- Successor: Kostas Karamanlis I cabinet

Costas Simitis served as a Prime Minister of Greece for three consecutive terms (1996-2004), at the head of the Panhellenic Socialist Movement (PASOK). His third cabinet was formed after the 2000 elections and was succeeded by the first cabinet of Kostas Karamanlis (New Democracy).

== Third Simitis cabinet, 2000–2004 ==
Office	Incumbent	Since
Prime Minister	Costas Simitis	13 April 2000
Minister for Foreign Affairs	George Papandreou	13 April 2000
replaced by	Tasos Giannitsis	13 February 2004 (interim)
Minister for National Defence	Akis Tsochatzopoulos	13 April 2000
replaced by	Yiannos Papantoniou	24 October 2001
Minister for the Interior, Public Administration and Decentralization	Vasso Papandreou	13 April 2000
replaced by	Kostas Skandalidis	24 October 2001
replaced by	Nikos Alivizatos	13 February 2004 (interim)
Minister of Economy and Finance	Yiannos Papantoniou	13 April 2001
replaced by	Nikos Christodoulakis	24 October 2001
Minister for Justice	Michalis Stathopoulos	13 April 2000
replaced by	Filippos Petsalnikos	24 October 2001
Minister for the Environment, Physical Planning and Public Works	Kostas Laliotis	13 April 2000
replaced by	Vasso Papandreou	24 October 2001
Minister for National Education and Religious Affairs	Petros Efthymiou	13 April 2000
Minister for Transport and Communications	Christos Verelis	13 April 2000
Minister of Labour and Social Solidarity	Tasos Giannitsis	13 April 2000
replaced by	Dimitris Reppas	24 October 2001
Minister for Health and Social Security	Alekos Papadopoulos	13 April 2000
replaced by	Konstantinos Stefanis	13 June 2002
Minister for Agriculture	Giorgos Anomeritis	13 April 2000
replaced by	Georgios Drys	24 October 2001
Minister for Public Order	Michalis Chrisochoidis	13 April 2000
replaced by	Giorgos Floridis	7 July 2003
Minister for Culture	Theodoros Pangalos	13 April 2000
replaced by	Evangelos Venizelos	20 November 2000
Minister for Culture	Christos Papoutsis	13 April 2000
replaced by	Evangelos Venizelos	20 November 2000
Minister for Development	Nikos Christodoulakis	13 April 2000
replaced by	Akis Tsochatzopoulos	24 October 2001
Minister for Mercantile Marine	Christos Papoutsis	13 April 2000
replaced by	Giorgos Anomeritis	24 October 2001
replaced by	Georgios Paschalidis	7 July 2003
Minister for the Press and the Media	Dimitris Reppas	13 April 2000
replaced by	Christos Protopapas	24 October 2001
replaced by	Georgios Romaios	13 February 2004 (interim)
Minister for Macedonia and Thrace	Georgios Paschalidis	13 April 2000
replaced by	Haris Kastanidis	7 July 2003
Minister for the Aegean	Nikolaos Sifounakis	13 April 2000
Minister of State	Miltiadis Papaioannou	13 April 2000
replaced by	Stefanos Manikas	24 October 2001
replaced by	Alexandros Akrivakis	7 July 2003
