= List of ministries of Greece =

This is a list of ministries of Greece. Greece is a country in Southern Europe, politically considered part of Western Europe. Greece is a parliamentary republic. Executive power is exercised by the president of the Republic and the government. Legislative powers are exercised by a 300-member elective unicameral Parliament.

- Ministry of Rural Development and Food
- Ministry of Justice
- Ministry of Digital Governance
- Ministry of National Defense
- Ministry of Foreign Affairs
- Ministry of Labour and Social Security
- Ministry of the Interior
- Ministry of National Economy and Finance
- Ministry of Education, Religious Affairs and Sports
- Ministry of the Environment and Energy
- Ministry of Development
- Ministry of Culture
- Ministry of Citizen Protection
- Ministry of Health
- Ministry of Migration and Asylum
- Ministry of Infrastructure and Transport
- Ministry of Maritime Affairs and Insular Policy
- Ministry of Tourism
- Ministry of Social Cohesion and Family
- Ministry of the Climate Crisis and Civil Protection
- Ministry of State

== See also ==
- Foreign Relations of Greece
- Politics of Greece
- Economy of Greece
- History of Modern Greece
