= Greek Civil Service =

The Civil Service of the Hellenic Republic, or Public Sector (Greek:Δημόσιος τομέας), includes the General Government, the Legal Entities of Public Law, as well as the enterprises that do not belong to the General Government, and organizations of Chapter A of Law 3429/2005 (A 314), regardless of whether they have been excluded from its application.

In February 2022, 565,418 people served in the Greek Civil Service.

== Structure ==
The General Government consists of the Central Government, Local Government Organizations (Local Authorities of First and Second Degree) and the Social Security Organizations. The sub-sector of the Central Government includes the Central Administration and the Legal Entities of Public Law, as well as the Legal Entities of Private Law that are included in the General Government and do not belong to the sub-sectors of LGOs and SSOs. The Central Administration includes the Presidency of the Republic, the Ministries, the Decentralized Administrations as well as the Independent Authorities that do not have legal status. Hellenic Parliament is also included, for statistical reasons, in the Central Administration, in accordance with its regulations, regarding the expenditure budget and its balance.

The local government sub-sector includes the First and Second degree Local Government Organizations (Municipalities and Regions)

The SSO subsector includes Social Security funds, Employment Agencies and Health Care Providers.

=== LEPL ===
Legal Entities of Public Law are legal entities whose mission is to exercise public authority and pursue public purposes. Public enterprises are considered the legal entities in which the state is the sole or principal, 50 + 1%, shareholder.

The compilation of the Register of Services and Bodies of the Greek Administration is based primarily on the regulations of Law 1892/1990 (article 51 par. 1 - Government Gazette A' 101) and Law 1943/1991 (4 par. 6 Government Gazette A' 50 ), as replaced by article 18 par. 9 of Law 2198/1994 (Government Gazette A '43) and article 3 par. 6 of Law 3229/2004 (Government Gazette A' 38), which determine, in accordance with organic criterion, the categories of public bodies of the Greek Administration, which constitute the Public Sector.
