= Occupational therapy in Greece =

Occupational Therapy in Greece is a recognized and institutionalized health and rehabilitation profession, with roots that can be traced back to the Second World War. The profession has followed international standards and today it is practiced in a multitude of health, welfare and education structures.

== History ==
The first applications of Occupational Therapy in Greece began in 1946 through programmes of the United Nations Relief and Rehabilitation Agency (UNRRA) and the Hellenic Red Cross, aiming at the rehabilitation of war-injured and disabled individuals in hospitals such as Rizarios Hospital and KAT Hospital.

The first Greek certified occupational therapist, Roula Grigoriadou, graduated in 1949 from Dorset House in the United Kingdom. She was followed by Lina Syrrou, Anna Deligianni and Sophia Douma, all of whom completed their studies in the United States.

In 1954, occupational therapy was institutionally incorporated into the Dromokaiteion Hospital as an aid to psychiatric rehabilitation.

== Education ==
The first public school of Occupational Therapy was founded in 1977 at the Centre for Higher Technical Education (Greek: Κέντρα Ανώτερης Τεχνικής Επαγγελματικής Εκπαίδευσης, Κ.Α.Τ.Ε.Ε.), while later it was integrated into TEI of Athens. In 2018, the Department of Occupational Therapy was incorporated into the University of West Attica (UniWA; Greek: Πανεπιστήμιο Δυτικής Αττικής, ΠΑΔΑ), providing undergraduate and postgraduate studies.

In 2019, the second public Department of Occupational Therapy was established at the University of Western Macedonia (UoWM; Greek: Πανεπιστήμιο Δυτικής Μακεδονίας), in Ptolemaida. The curriculum was officially certified by the World Federation of Occupational Therapists (WFOT) in 2021.

== Legal and professional framework ==
Occupational therapy is a legally registered health profession in Greece and is practiced exclusively by qualified occupational therapists with a professional license. The profession is supervised by the Panhellenic Association of Ergotherapists (PSE - L.E.P.L.), which maintains the Registry of Occupational Therapists.

Occupational therapists work in public and private settings, such as hospitals, rehabilitation centres, psychiatric institutions, schools, day centres and in-home care.

== Contemporary developments and perspectives ==
Occupational Therapy in Greece is constantly developing, with new areas of application emerging such as:

- Communal occupational therapy
- Support for children with developmental disorders
- Interventions in education
- Services for the elderly
- Home-based occupational therapy

There is an increasing demand for occupational therapists, particularly due to the ageing population and the need for rehabilitation and enhancement of functionality.

== See also ==
- Occupational Therapy
- Occupational Therapist
- Panhellenic Association of Ergotherapists
