= Papagiannopoulos =

Papagiannopoulos is a surname. Notable people with the surname include:

- Sotirios Papagiannopoulos
- Dionysis Papagiannopoulos
- Nikos Papagiannopoulos
