= Panhellenic Association of Ergotherapists =

The Panhellenic Association of Ergotherapists (aka PAE, in Greek ΠΣΕ) is a Legal Entity of Public Law (aka LEPL, in Greek ΝΠΔΔ) based in Athens, which was established on March 28, 2017 and it is supervised by the Ministry of Health (Greece). Ιt has its own property, financial, administrative and management autonomy and independence and is not funded by the State Budget.

== Aims of the Association ==
The main aims of the Panhellenic Association of Ergotherapists are "to promote and develop occupational therapy as an independent and autonomous science, as well as to provide high quality services to the community"

== Organisation and Management ==
=== Organisation ===
The organization of the Panhellenic Association of Ergotherapists is as follows:

- Central Command, based in Athens
- 1st Regional Department - Central Greece, Thessaly, Aegean Islands & Crete, based in Athens
- 2nd Regional Department - Macedonia & Thrace, based in Thessaloniki
- 3rd Regional Department - Epirus, Etoloakarnania, Ionian Islands, Peloponnese, based in Patras

=== Governing bodies ===
The governing bodies of the Panhellenic Association of Ergotherapists are:

1. General Assembly of Representatives
2. Board of directors

There, also, exist the:

- Supreme Disciplinary Board
- Central Audit Committee.

==== Regional Departments ====
The governing bodies of each of the Regional Departments are:

1. Regional Assembly
2. Regional Council

Also, there exist the:

- Audit Committee
- Primary Disciplinary Board.

== Practice of the profession of Occupational Therapist in Greece ==
In order to practice the profession of Occupational Therapist in Greece, it is mandatory to register to the Panhellenic Association of Ergotherapists as a regular member. This regular membership is subject to mandatory annual renewal and the certificate of registration of the relevant Regional Department of the Panhellenic Association of Ergotherapists is a necessary supporting document for the issuance of the Attestation of notification for the practice of the profession of occupational therapist by the competent services.

== See also ==
- American Occupational Therapy Association
- American Occupational Therapy Foundation
- Occupational therapy
- Occupational therapy in Greece
