= Ministry for the Press and the Media =

Greek government department

The Ministry for the Press and the Media of Greece (Greek: Υπουργείο Τύπου και Μέσων Μαζικής Ενημέρωσης) was a government department of Greece.

== History ==
The ministry has its origins in the Department of Press and Tourism formed on 29 August 1936. Until 1974, the Department functioned in various organisational forms, such as General Directorate of Press and Information, the Department of Press and Information, the Ministry of Press and Information, either as a self-contained department, or under the Office of the Prime Minister, sometimes as part of the government presidency, and other times under the Ministry of Foreign Affairs.

From 1974 to 1994, it functioned as the Secretariat General of Press and Information under the Ministry of the Presidency of the Government. In 1994, under Presidential Decree 181, it was consolidated as the Ministry of Press and Mass Media.

In 2004, the ministry was dissolved and two General Secretariats under the Prime Minister were established: The Secretariat General of Communication and the Secretariat General of Information, which incorporated the functions of the defunct ministry.

On 26 May 2004, the prime minister placed the two secretariats under the aegis of the Minister of State.

== List of ministers (1994–2004) ==
Name	Took office	Left office	Party
Evangelos Venizelos	July 8, 1994	September 15, 1995	Panhellenic Socialist Movement
Tilemachos Chytiris	September 15, 1995	January 22, 1996	Panhellenic Socialist Movement
Dimitris Reppas	January 22, 1996	August 30, 1996	Panhellenic Socialist Movement
Dimitrios Konstas	August 30, 1996	September 25, 1996	Panhellenic Socialist Movement
Dimitris Reppas	September 25, 1996	March 20, 2000	Panhellenic Socialist Movement
Anargyros Fatouros	March 20, 2000	April 13, 2000	Panhellenic Socialist Movement
Dimitris Reppas	April 13, 2000	October 24, 2001	Panhellenic Socialist Movement
Christos Protopapas	October 24, 2001	February 13, 2004	Panhellenic Socialist Movement
Georgios Romaios	February 13, 2004	March 10, 2004	Panhellenic Socialist Movement
