= Vasilios Magginas =

Greek politician (1949–2015)

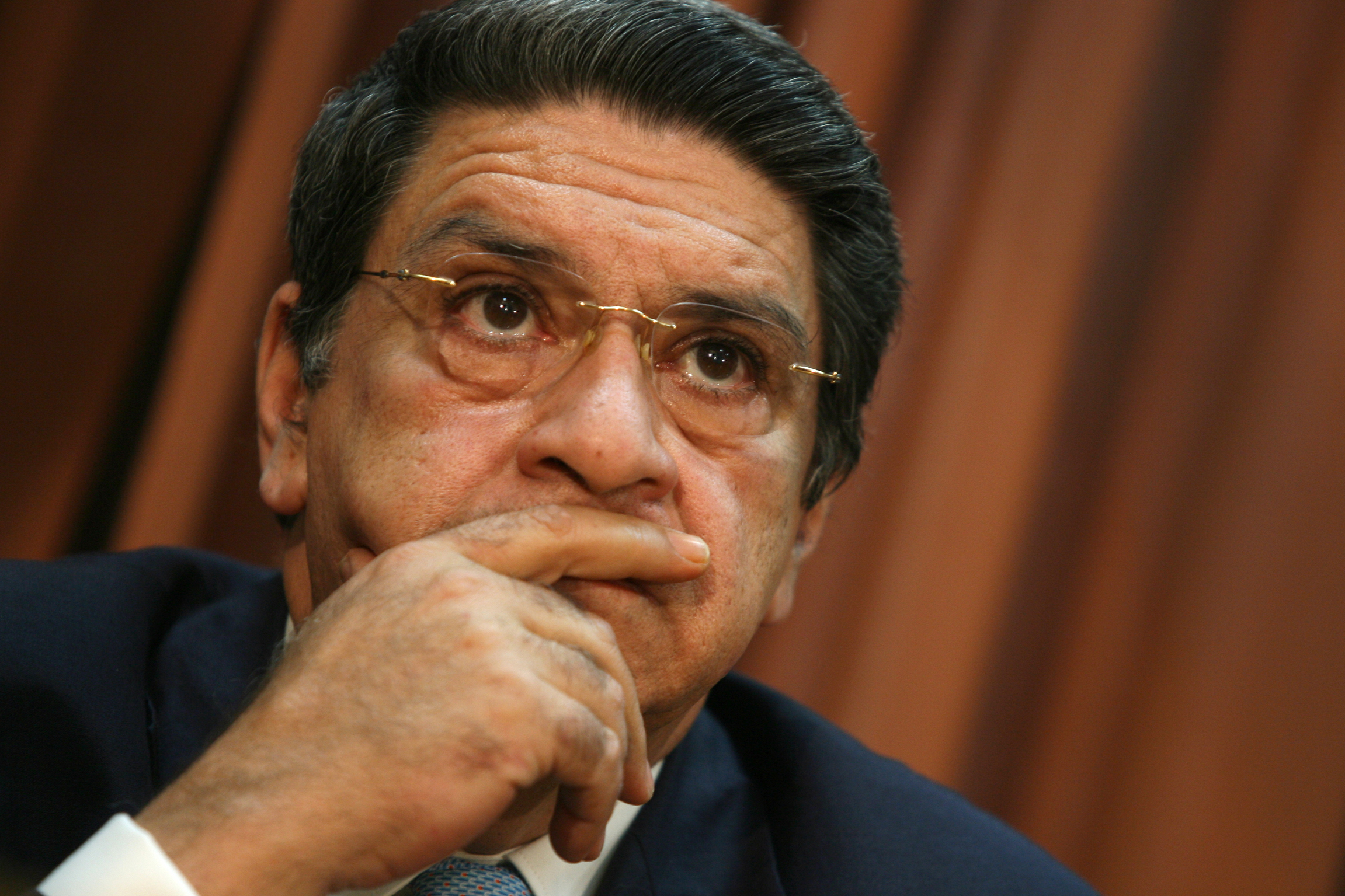
- Born: 22 October 1949; Athens
- Died: 6 March 2015 (aged 65); Athens

Vasilios Magginas (Greek: Βασίλης Μαγγίνας; 22 October 1949 – 6 March 2015) was a Greek politician, member of the Greek Parliament for the New Democracy for the Aetolia-Acarnania constituency and government minister.

He was from Astakos, Aetolia-Acarnania, and was elected MP with New Democracy in all the general elections from 1993 to 2007.

He held the government posts of spokesman for the government led by Constantine Mitsotakis from 1992 until 1993 and Minister of Employment in 2007 under Kostas Karamanlis.

Magginas resigned as a minister on 15 December 2007 after facing negative publicity over allegations he employed illegal, uninsured immigrants at his holiday residence.

He died on 5 March 2015 from post-operative complications of gangrenous cholecystitis.

| Preceded by Savvas Tsitouridis | Minister of Employment; 2007 | Succeeded by Fani Palli-Petralia |
