= Vasileios Tsiatouras =

Greek police officer

Vasileios Tsiatouras (Greek: Βασίλειος Τσιατούρας) is a Greek police officer who served as Chief of the Hellenic Police in 2008–2009.

He was born in the village of Petra in Ioannina regional unit, and entered the Hellenic Gendarmerie in 1971 as an NCO. In 1976 he attended the Gendarmerie Officers School and graduated in 1979. From 1985 until 1999 he served in the Crime and Homicide Division of the Athens Security Directorate, eventually rising to lead the department himself. In 1999 he organized the Internal Affairs Service of the Police, which he also directed until 2002. As a Police Brigadier General, in 2002–2004 he was head of the Athens Security Directorate. Promoted to Major General in October 2004, he was appointed as head of the Attica General Police Directorate. On 1 March 2006 he was promoted to Lieutenant General and Police Inspector for Southern Greece, then on 2 March 2007 he was placed as Chief of the Police Headquarters Staff, and on 1 March 2008 he was appointed Chief of the Police, holding the post until his resignation on 22 October 2009.

== Sources ==
- "Βασίλειος Τσιατούρας". Hellenic Police website (in Greek).

Police appointments
Preceded by Lt. General Anastasios Dimoschakis	Chief of the Hellenic Police; 1 March 2008 – 22 October 2009	Succeeded by Lt. General Eleftherios Oikonomou
