= Tilemachos Chytiris =

Greek politician

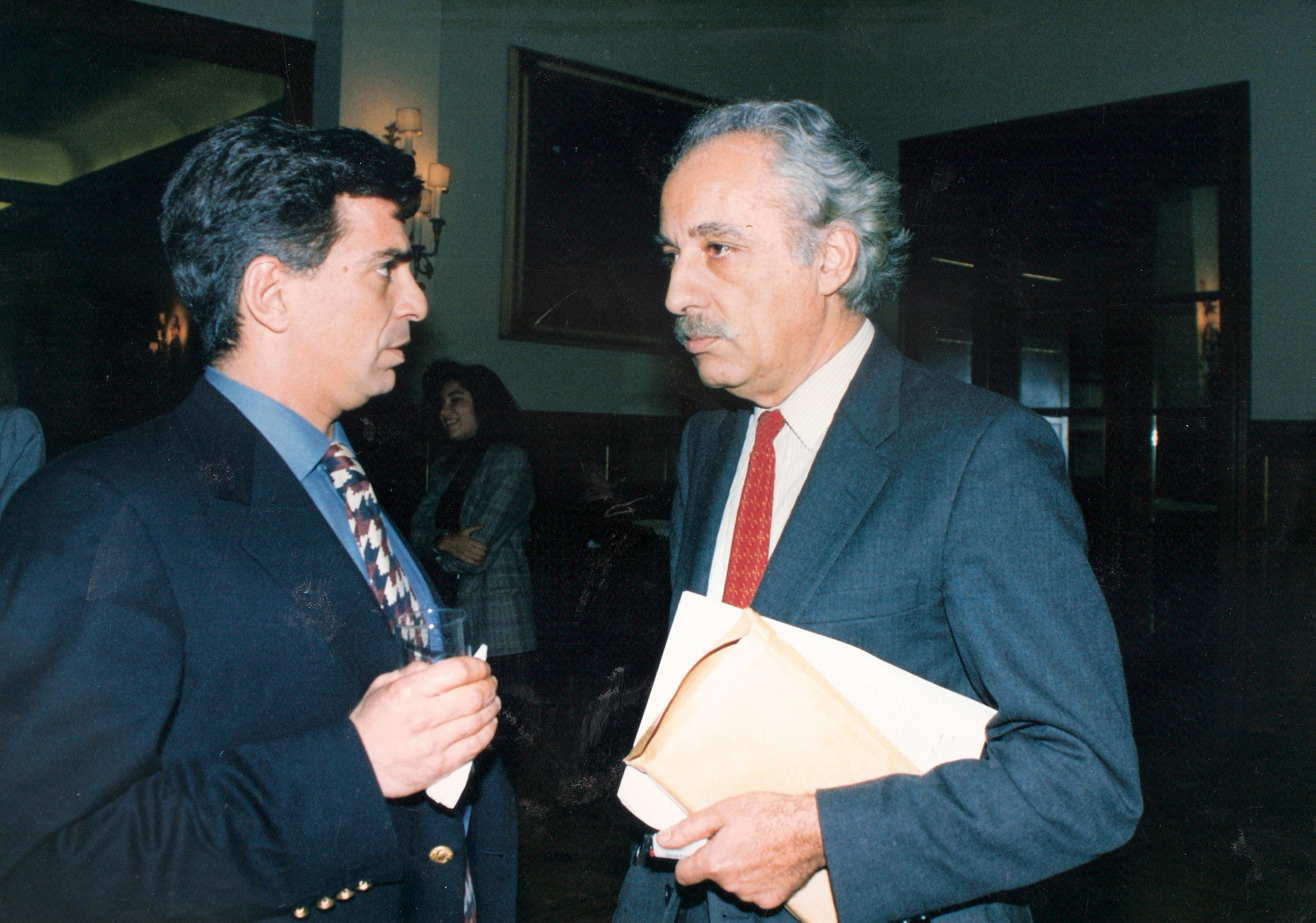
Tilemachos Chytiris on the right

Tilemachos Chytiris (Greek: Τηλέμαχος Χυτήρης; born 30 August 1945) is a Greek politician from the Panhellenic Socialist Movement (PASOK) who has served as member of Parliament and a minister. He has also published poetry collections.

== Biography ==
He was born in 1945 in Corfu. His father, Gerasimos Chytiris, was an important author, journalist and folklorist of the island. He studied Philosophy at the University of Florence and Agriculture at the University of Pisa. He was a member of the Lambrakis Democratic Youth and took part in the Anti-Junta movement against the Greek military junta of 1967–74.

He worked as press advisor in the Greek Embassy in Bucharest (1982-1984) and in London (1984-1987). From 1987 to 1989 he was special Secretary at the Ministry for the Presidency of the Government. In 1989 Andreas Papandreou appoints him as his spokesman for media. In 1990 he became a member of the Central Committee of PASOK. He was elected in Athens B constituency in the 1993 elections and reelected in every election until 2009. He served as deputy minister of Presidency (1993-4), deputy minister for the Press and the Media (1994-5) and minister for the Press and the Media (1995-6). From 2000 to 2004 he was deputy minister Ministry for the Press and the Media in the third Cabinet of Costas Simitis. In the cabinet of George Papandreou he served as alternate Minister for Culture and Tourism responsible for the Media until 2011.

When he was in Florence he met the famous Greek singer Maria Farantouri with whom he got married and has a son, Stephanos.

Along with his political career, Tilemachos Chytiris has published several poetry collections and some of his poems have been translated and published in Italian, French, English, German and Romanian.

== Works ==
The collections he has published include:

- Poiimata ek promeletis (Ποιήματα εκ προμελέτης) (1968-1972)
- Thema (Θέμα) (1972-1977)
- Topoi Neoi (Τόποι Νέοι) (1982-1984)
- San na sinevi (Σαν Να Συνέβη) (1984-1986)
- Kalokairi (Καλοκαίρι) (2001)
- Kitrini Skoni (Κίτρινη Σκόνη) (2006)
- Ti menei ap to rodo & Mikro Manifesto (Τι μένει απ' το Ρόδο" & "Μικρό μανιφέστο) (2010)
