= Katerina Batzeli =

Greek politician (born 1958)

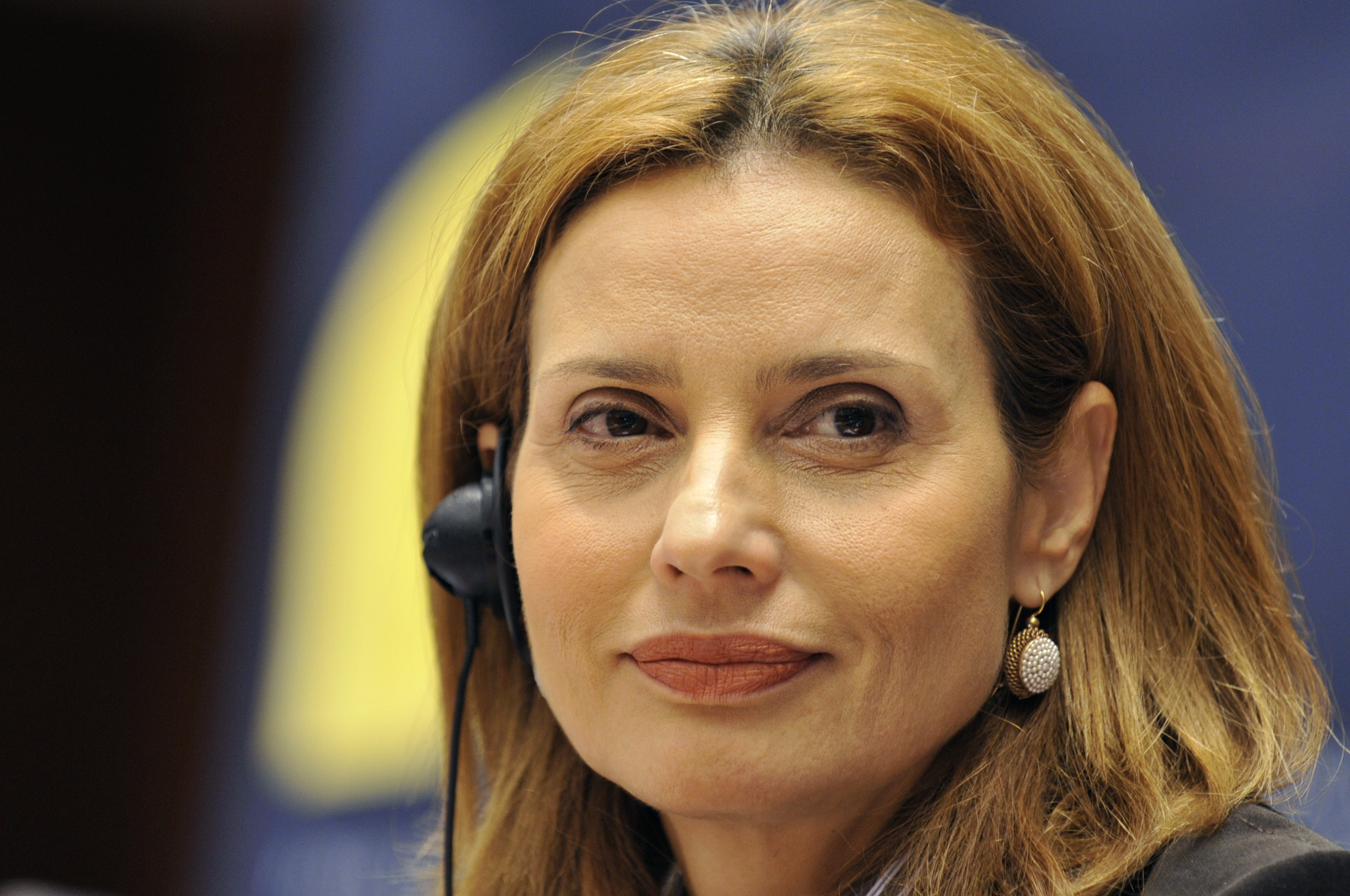
Katerina Batzeli

Aikaterini Batzeli (Greek: Αικατερίνη Μπατζελή; born 25 May 1958, in Athens) is a Greek politician, Member of Parliament in Greece and a former Member of the European Parliament (MEP) for the Panhellenic Socialist Movement, part of the Party of European Socialists. She served as the Minister for Rural Development and Food from 7 October 2009 to 7 September 2010, as part of the First Cabinet of George Papandreou.

As MEP, Batzeli advocated strongly for the retention of the European Union's subsidy program for vineyards One of her last acts as MEP, she co-sponsored the 2009 declaration in support of the Special Olympics.
