= Sokratis Xynidis =

Greek politician

Sokratis Xynidis Σωκράτης Ξυνίδης MP
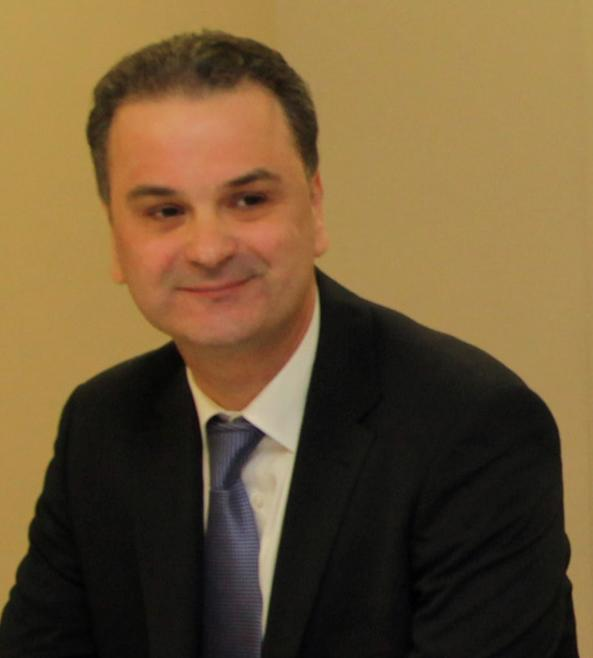

Alternate Minister for Regional Development and Competitiveness
- In office 7 September 2010 – 17 May 2012
- President: Karolos Papoulias
- Prime Minister: George Papandreou

Personal details
- Born: 14 June 1963 (age 63) Xanthi, Greece
- Party: PASOK (2009–2012)
- Other political affiliations: KINAL
- Education: Democritus University of Thrace
- Profession: Lawyer

Sokratis Xynidis (Greek: Σωκράτης Ξυνίδης; born 14 June 1963 in Xanthi, Greece) is a Greek politician and former member of the Hellenic Parliament for the Panhellenic Socialist Movement (PASOK). He served as Alternate Minister for Regional Development and Competitiveness (2010–2012) and General Secretary of PASOK under George Papandreou.

== Early life ==
Sokratis was born on June 14, 1963, in Xanthi. He studied Law at the Democritus University of Thrace.

In 2009 he was elected Member of Parliament for Xanthi with PASOK.

Since October 2009 he has been Secretary General of the National Council of PASOK, and since September 2010 he has been Deputy Minister of Development, Competitiveness and Shipping in the Government of Georgios Papandreou 2009, a position he retained in the same ministry and in the Government of Lucas Papademos in 2011.

He is married to Elina Stavridou, with whom he had 2 children.
