= Fani Palli-Petralia =

Greek lawyer and politician

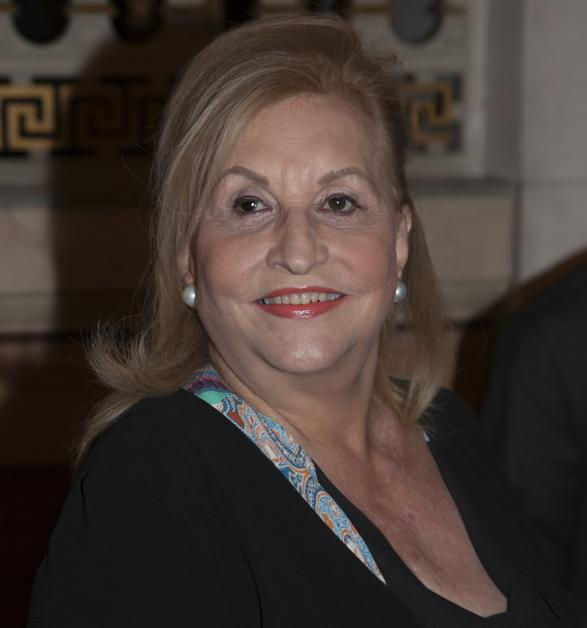
Fani-Palli Petralia

Fani Palli-Petralia (born August 10, 1943) is a Greek lawyer, New Democracy politician and a former Minister for Employment and Social Protection. She is also a former Minister of Tourism, the first woman to hold this position.

== Life ==
Born in Athens, she studied law at the University of Athens. She is married to Nikos Pallis and has three daughters and a son.

== Political life ==
- She was elected MP for the Athens B constituency in the general elections of 1985, 1989 (June and November), 1990, 1993, 1996 and 2000.
- She was elected to the ND Central Committee in 1990 and the Executive Committee in 1997. In 1999, she became president of the European Women’s Union. In 2002, she was elected president of the International Democratic Union of Women.
- She served as Deputy Minister for Culture from 1990 to 1991 and Deputy Minister for Health, Welfare and Social Security from 1992 to 1993. She was Alternate Minister for Culture from 2004 to 2006.
- She was appointed Minister for Tourism on 15 February 2006, and was not included in the Cabinet that was appointed after the September 2007 parliamentary election.
- On 18 December 2007, Palli-Petralia returned to the cabinet as Minister for Employment and Social Protection.

Preceded by Post created	Alternate Minister for Culture; 2004–2006	Succeeded by Post abolished
Preceded by Dimitris Avramopoulos	Minister for Tourism; 2006–2007	Succeeded by Aris Spiliotopoulos
Preceded by Vasilios Magginas	Minister for Employment and Social Protection; 2007–2009	Succeeded by Andreas Loverdos
