= Eleftherios Oikonomou =

Greek police officer and politician

Eleftherios Oikonomou (Greek: Ελευθέριος Οικονόμου; born 12 April 1956) is a former Chief of the Hellenic Police, and former Minister for Citizen Protection of Greece. Since 9 July 2019, he is the Deputy Minister for Citizen Protection, responsible for anti-crime policy, in the Cabinet of Kyriakos Mitsotakis.

He was born in 1956 in the town of Konitsa, in Epirus. In 1974, he was hired by the Greek Gendarmerie (merged with the Cities Police to form today's Hellenic Police in 1984) and graduated from the Officers Academy; Oikonomou subsequently served for many years in the elite State Security Division (Διεύθυνση Κρατικής Ασφάλειας), responsible for protecting Greece's democratic form of government

In 2001, he was appointed as the first Press Spokesman of the Police and the Ministry of Public Order, responsible for the Police's overall media strategy, a post he held until 2006; Early during his tenure, the police managed to destroy the Revolutionary Organization 17 November terrorist group, propelling Oikonomou to nationwide prominence.

As a Police Brigadier General he served as head of the Attica Aliens Directorate and First Deputy Director of the Attica Security Sub-Directorate until March 2008. Promoted to Major General, he was placed in charge of the Police VIP security directorate. On 3 March 2009 he was promoted to Lieutenant General and placed as Inspector General for Southern Greece, while on 5 November 2009 he was named Chief of the Hellenic Police. He held the post until 17 October 2011, when he was appointed General Secretary for Public Order.

On 6 March 2012, he was appointed Deputy Minister for Citizen Protection in a reshuffle of the Lucas Papademos cabinet, and on 17 May 2012, he was named Minister of Citizen Protection in the interim government of Panagiotis Pikrammenos, a post he held until 21 June 2012.

He is married and has one daughter.

== Sources ==
- "Ελευθέριος Οικονόμου". Hellenic Police website (in Greek).

Police appointments
Preceded by Lt. General Vasileios Tsiatouras	Chief of the Hellenic Police; 5 November 2009 – 17 October 2011	Succeeded by Lt. General Nikos Papagiannopoulos
Government offices
Preceded by Michalis Chrisochoidis	Minister for Citizen Protection; 17 May – 21 June 2012	Succeeded by Nikos Dendias
Preceded by Katerina Papakosta	Deputy Minister for Citizen Protection; 9 July 2019 – present	Incumbent
