= Miltiadis Papaioannou =

Greek politician (born 1947)

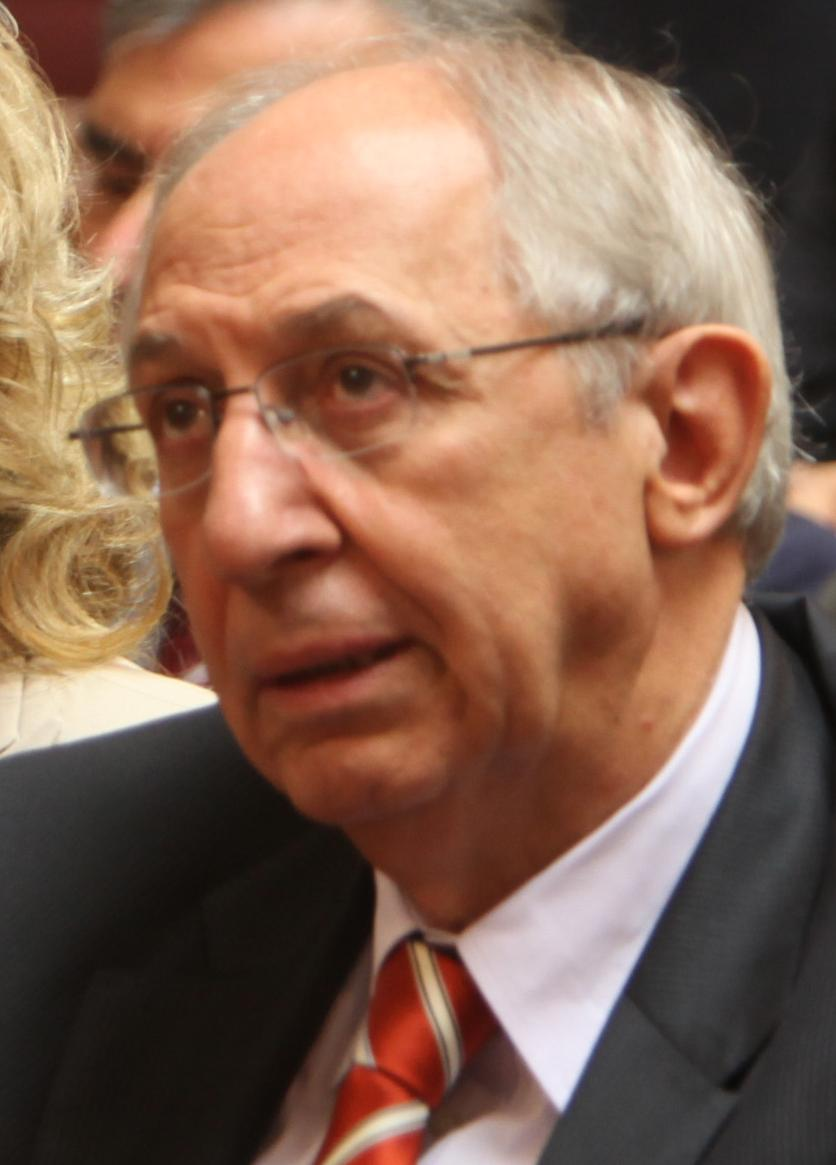
Miltos Papaioanou

Miltiadis Papaioannou (Greek: Μιλτιάδης Παπαϊωάννου, born 1947) is a Greek politician of the Panhellenic Socialist Movement (PASOK).

He was born in the village of Lykouria (now part of the municipality of Kalavryta) in Achaea. He studied law at the Aristotle University of Thessaloniki and has worked as a lawyer. He became a member of the PASOK political organization from its foundation, and has been elected into the Hellenic Parliament from 1981 for the Athens B constituency except for the 1989, 1993 and 2007 elections. He has served in the following cabinet posts: Deputy Minister of the Interior (1982), Minister of Justice (1985), Deputy Minister to the Presidency of the Government and Government Spokesman (1986), General Secretary of the Ministry of National Economy (1993), Minister of Labour and Social Security (1996), Minister of State (2000). From 17 June 2011 until 17 May 2012 he occupied the post of Minister of Justice, Transparency and Human Rights.
