= Anna Diamantopoulou =

Greek politician

- Άννα Διαμαντοπούλου
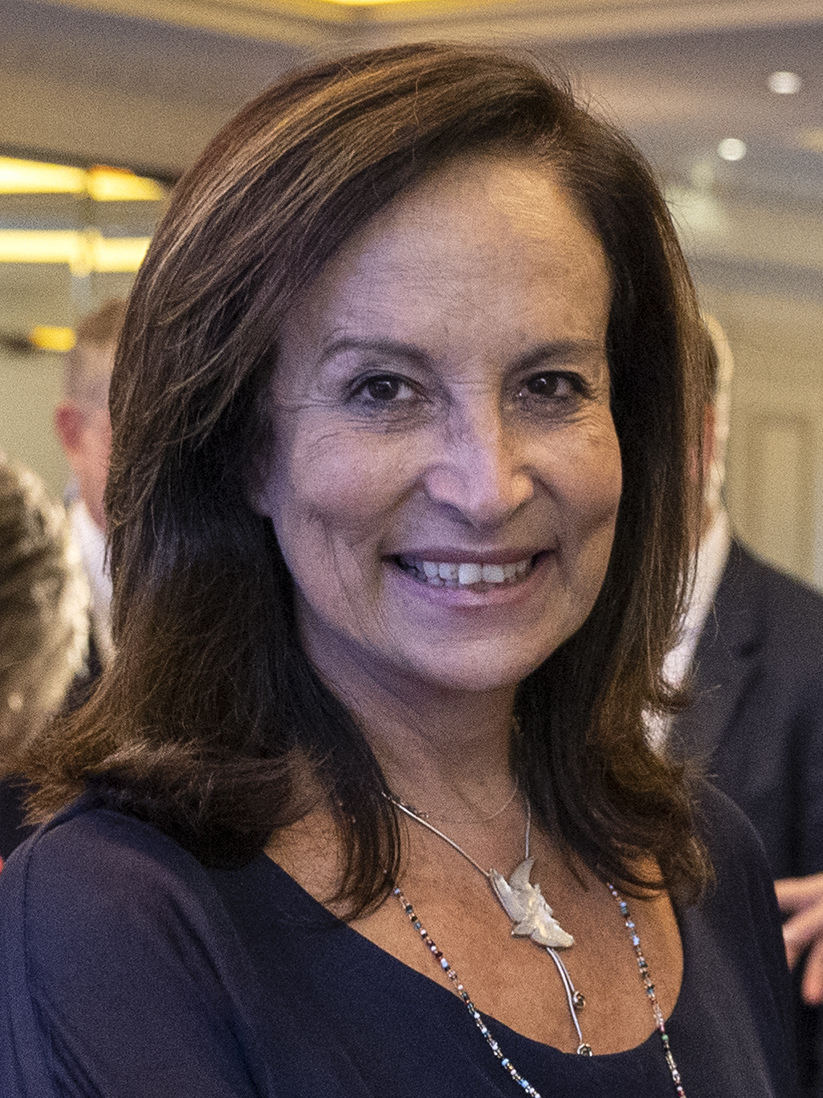
- Diamantopoulou in 2023

Minister for Development, Competitiveness and Shipping
- In office 7 March 2012 – 17 May 2012
- Prime Minister: Lucas Papademos
- Preceded by: Michalis Chrisochoidis
- Succeeded by: Yannis Stournaras

Minister for Education, Lifelong Learning and Religious Affairs
- In office 7 October 2009 – 7 March 2012
- Prime Minister: George Papandreou; Lucas Papademos
- Preceded by: Aris Spiliotopoulos (National Education and Religious Affairs)
- Succeeded by: Georgios Babiniotis

European Commissioner for Employment and Social Affairs
- In office 25 September 1999 – 18 February 2004
- President: Romano Prodi
- Preceded by: Pádraig Flynn
- Succeeded by: Stavros Dimas

Member of the Hellenic Parliament
- In office 22 September 1996 – 16 September 1999
- In office 7 March 2004 – 11 April 2012

Personal details
- Born: 26 February 1959 (age 67) Kozani, Greece
- Party: Panhellenic Socialist Movement
- Spouse: Giannis Savalanos
- Children: Haridimos
- Education: Aristotle University of Thessaloniki; Panteion University
- Website: www.diamantopoulou.gr

Anna Diamantopoulou (Greek: Άννα Διαμαντοπούλου; born 26 February 1959) is a Greek civil engineer and politician of the Panhellenic Socialist Movement (PASOK) who currently serves as president of the Athens-based think tank "DIKTIO" Network for Reform in Greece and Europe.

Earlier in her career, Diamantopoulou served as Minister of Education as well as Minister for Development, Competitiveness and Shipping. She also served as European Commissioner for Employment, Social Affairs and Equal Opportunities in the Prodi Commission, a post she held between 1999 and 2004. She has since held various positions, including in corporate boards.

== Education and academic career ==
Diamantopoulou attended Aristotle University of Thessaloniki where she received training in civil engineering and then earned graduate degree with honours on regional development from the Panteion University.

She was a lecturer at various academic institutions including Bocconi, Boston and Harvard universities, Goethe University Frankfurt, London School of Economics, Aristotle University of Thessaloniki, National and Kapodistrian University of Athens, University of Modena and Reggio Emilia, Queens College, City University of New York, and Massachusetts Institute of Technology.

== Political career ==
=== Career in national politics ===
Diamantopoulou joined the Panhellenic Socialist Movement (PASOK) youth organisation in 1976 and was elected as president of the university's civil engineering students’ union a year later.

Diamantopoulou's political career began in 1984, when she was appointed a Prefect (Governor) of Kastoria. Appointed at the age of 25, she was the youngest ever Governor in the history of Greek State. Two years later, she was appointed Secretary General for Adult Education and later for Youth. She was appointed President of the Hellenic Organization of Small and Medium-Sized Enterprises and Handicraft (EOMMEX) in 1993 and left the position to become Secretary General for Industry.

Diamantopoulou's parliamentary career began in 1996 when she was elected to represent the district of Kozani. In the government of Prime Minister Costas Simitis, she was appointed Deputy Minister for Development in charge of responsible for industrial restructuring as well as the privatization of 100 state companies, a position she left in order to become a European Commissioner.

=== Member of the European Commission, 1999–2004 ===
From 1999 until 2004, Diamantopoulou served as the European Commissioner for Employment, Social Affairs and Equal Opportunities in the European Commission led by President Romano Prodi, which made her the youngest person and second woman to be appointed Member of the European Commission by the Greek government.

During her mandate in the Prodi Commission, Diamantopoulou completed various legislative initiatives, including the “Agenda for Social Policy” for the EU. The agenda included a series of strategies and programs which aimed at securing equal opportunities for men and women, improving working conditions, legislating against discrimination at work and the fight against social exclusion.

Another initiative was the European Health Insurance Card, considered at the time to be a step towards a Social Europe. She promoted agreement on the White Paper on Corporate Social Responsibility, establishing CSR as an important aspect in European business agenda. Diamantopoulou was also the legislator behind the establishment and implementation of the regular issuance of EU guidelines for a European Employment Strategy.

Diamantopoulou led efforts on the European Commission's legislative initiative against discrimination in 2003, by introducing a directive against discriminations based on gender, origin, religion, handicap and sexual orientation. The directive aimed to outlaw sexism in areas like television programming, advertising, taxation, newspaper content and education as well as to ensure equal access to goods and services for women and men, e.g. not pay more for health insurance because you are a woman who may have a child.

In 2003 Diamantopoulou and Pehr Gyllenhammar held a nomination ceremony of European awards which acknowledged the excellence in the fields of lifelong learning, diversity and gender equality.

=== Minister of Education, 2009–2012 ===
On 4 October 2009 Diamantopoulou was re-elected as a Member of Parliament and served as Minister for Education, Lifelong Learning and Religious Affairs in the cabinet of George Papandreou.

As minister, Diamantopoulou introduced the major legislative reform of Higher Education in the “Metapolitefsi Period” overhauling the existing status quo. The so-called “Diamantopoulou Law” included reforms for primary and secondary education ranging from rationalization of resources to educational content, the introduction of “Digital School” in all levels of education system and the introduction of a new Framework for Lifelong Learning. The “Diamantopoulou Law” is considered an example of parliamentary consensus, as it was approved by a supermajority of 255 MPs. She also introduced legislation to partially liberalize higher education by permitting private sponsorship of science, technology and business programmes at state universities.

=== Minister of Competitiveness, 2012 ===
Later on, Diamantopoulou was appointed Minister of Competitiveness, Development and Shipping. Upon taking office, she suspended more than 100 civil servants involved in awarding investment grants, following the arrest of two officials for taking bribes. She also managed to unblock EU funds left unspent by her predecessors. One of her major achievements was the introduction of the “Competitiveness Bill”, a legislation for removing existing barriers for entrepreneurship, exports, tourism and other economic activities.

Diamantopoulou was among a number of prominent PASOK politicians who were voted out in the May 2012 Greek legislative election.

=== Post-Ministerial politics ===
In prospects of the 2024 PASOK – KINAL leadership election she announced her interest in competing among others against Nikos Androulakis for the leadership of the PASOK-KINAL party on 6 October 2024.

== Later career ==
In 2012 Diamantopoulou became a Fisher Family Fellow at the John F. Kennedy School of Government and in 2015 was named Distinguished Scholar by the Lee Kuan Yew School of Public Policy.

Since 2013, Diamantopoulou has been presiding over DIKTIO-Network for Reform in Greece and Europe, a leading Athens-based independent, non-partisan and non-profit think tank that aims to undertake cutting-edge policy research and practical policy advice. The purpose of DIKTIO's establishment has been to effectively forge partnerships for policy change at the domestic level and promote informed debate about Greece's role in the European Union and the world. DIKTIO is the first Greek think tank to host major international personalities for closed-door discussion with high-level Greek stakeholders.

In 2020 Diamantopoulou was named as possible candidate to the post of OECD secretary general to succeed Angel Gurria in 2021, having been nominated by Prime Minister Kyriakos Mitsotakis.

== Writing career ==
Diamantopoulou is also known for her authorship of various books on Greece and its European integration. Such an example would be her Exipni Ellada (Intelligent Greece) which outlines the need for innovation, goal-oriented endeavours and professional approaches as the key prerequisites for social and economic progress. Her other books are: European Integration and Governance: A Comparison with the US Model in Transatlantic Relations: Cooperation or Competition and The Future of Europe: A Discussion for All – A Question of Participation. In 2020, Anna Diamantopoulou published a book in Greek, on progress and peace in the 21st century, with foreword by EU High Representative/Vice-president Josep Borrell.

== Other activities ==
=== Corporate boards ===
- Coca-Cola Hellenic Bottling Company, Independent Non-Executive Member of the Board of Directors (since 2020)
- Kekst CNC, Member of the Global Advisory Board (since 2021)

=== Non-profit organizations ===
- Bussola Institute, Member of the Advisory Board
- Delphi Economic Forum, Member of the Advisory Board
- European Council on Foreign Relations (ECFR), Member
- European Movement International, Member of the Honorary Council
- Foundation for European Progressive Studies (FEPS), Member of the Scientific Council
- Friends of Europe, Member of the Board of Trustees
- Institute for Cultural Diplomacy (ICD), Member of the Advisory Board
- Trilateral Commission, Member of the European Group

== Awards ==
- Legion of Honour (2002)

Anna Diamantopoulou was on one of the juries for the Women of Europe Awards.

== Sources ==
- Official Website of Anna Diamantopoulou – Biography (in Greek)
- Biography of Anna Diamantopoulou in the Official Website of the Hellenic Parliament (in Greek) – (in English)
- Interview with President of DIKTIO Greece, Anna Diamantopoulou
- H.E. Anna Diamantopoulou at Bussola Institute
- Anna Diamantopoulou at Politico

Political offices
Preceded by Christos Papoutsis	Greek European Commissioner; 1999–2004	Succeeded by Stavros Dimas
Preceded by Pádraig Flynn	European Commissioner for Employment and Social Affairs; 1999–2004	Succeeded by Stavros Dimas
Preceded by Aris Spiliotopoulos as Minister for National Education and Religious Affairs	Minister for Education, Lifelong Learning and Religious Affairs; 2009–2012	Succeeded by Georgios Babiniotis
Preceded by Michalis Chrisochoidis	Minister for Development, Competitiveness and Shipping; 2012	Succeeded by Yannis Stournaras
