= Nikos Papagiannopoulos =

Chief of the Hellenic Police
- Incumbent
- Assumed office 2011

Personal details
- Born: 1956 (age 69–70) Aetolia-Acarnania, Greece
- Education: National and Kapodistrian University of Athens, Panteion University
- Profession: Law Enforcement

Lieutenant General Nikos Papagiannopoulos (Greek: Νίκος Παπαγιαννόπουλος, born in 1956, in Aetolia-Acarnania, Greece) is the Chief of the Hellenic Police since October 2011.

== Early life and education ==
Nikos Papagiannopoulos was born in 1956 at Katafygio, a town in Aetolia-Acarnania. He entered the Academy of the Cities Police in 1975 and graduated first in his class in 1982. He holds two bachelor's degrees, one from the Law School of the National and Kapodistrian University of Athens and one from the School of Public Administration (Panteion University) .

In addition, Lieutenant General Nikos Papagiannopoulos holds a special degree from the Zosimaia Academy, as well as a certificate from the School of National Security (an elite institution for training high-ranking officers of the Hellenic Police).

== Career ==
In his early career, he served in the Attica Immediate Response Directorate, but later on he moved to less frontline and more administrative departments.

From 2006 until 2009 he commanded the Branch of Organization and Legislation and the Branch of Personnel and Human Resources at the central Headquarters of the Hellenic Police in Athens.

On 5 November 2009, he was promoted to Lieutenant General and assigned as Chief of Staff at the Headquarters, a post he held until 17 October 2011, when he was named Chief of the Hellenic Police.

Lieutenant General Nikos Papagiannopoulos is married and has two daughters.

Police appointments
Preceded by Lt. General Eleftherios Oikonomou	Chief of the Hellenic Police since 17 October 2011	Incumbent
