= Haris Pamboukis =

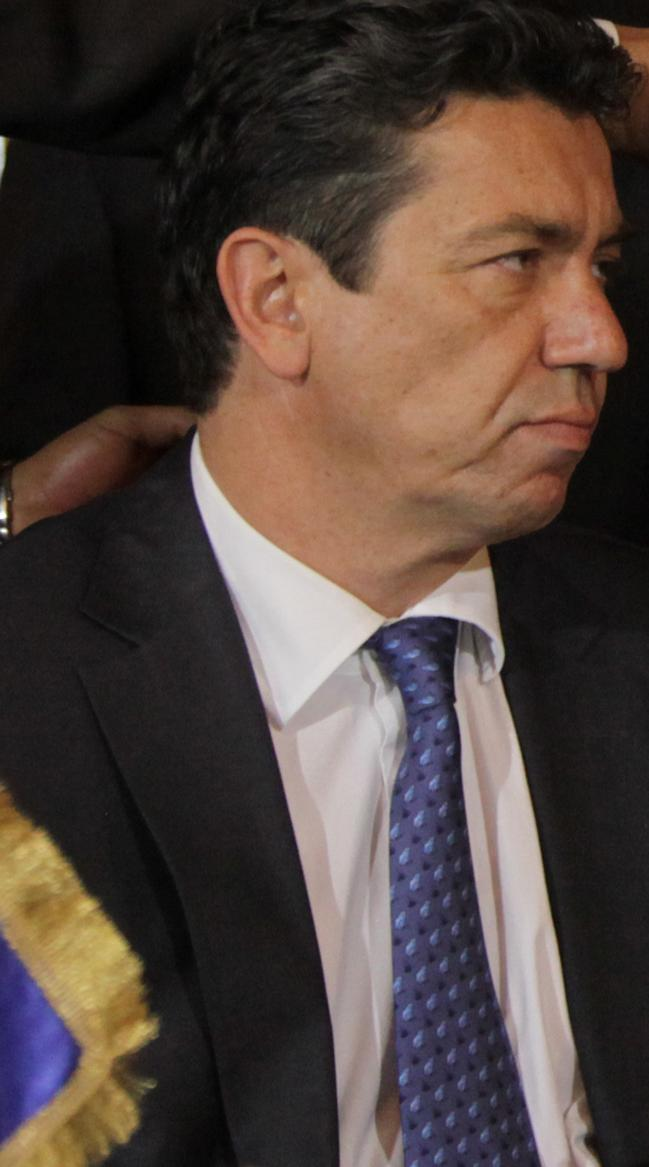

Deputy Minister of Development Competitiveness and Mercantile Shipping
- In office 27 June 2011 – 26 August 2011
- Prime Minister: George Papandreou

Minister of State
- In office 7 October 2009 – 17 June 2011
- Prime Minister: George Papandreou
- Succeeded by: Elias Mossialos

Personal details
- Born: 1958, Athens
- Profession: Professor of Private International Law (1991-2025)

Haris Pamboukis (also written: Pampoukis, born June 29, 1958 in Athens) is a Greek Academic, Professor Emeritus of private international law and international business transactions at the National and Kapodistrian University of Athens, Faculty of Law (1991-2025), lawyer licensed to practice law before the Supreme Court and ex Minister of State (and for a short period, Deputy Minister of Development) in the government of George Papandreou (2009-2011). He is the author of numerous articles in Greek, English, and French, and has published several legal monographs, legal opinions and political essays.

== Biography ==
Haris Pamboukis was born in Athens in 1958 and has two children.

=== Legal career ===
He studied law in Paris (Paris I- Panthéon - Sorbonne) from where he also obtained a PhD with honors in 1990 (Docteur d'Etat en droit). His thesis, under the title “L'acte public étranger en droit international privé” (Lagarde Bibliothèque de Droit Privé, t.219, Paris (1987), prologue Paul Lagarde), was published in 1993 in Librairie de Droit et de la Jurisprudence, has earned several national and international awards, and has been cited internationally in the field of private international law.

From 1990 until 1996, he served as chief editor of the Journal Revue Hellenique de Droit International.

Since 2020, he has served as the Director of the Hellenic Institute of International and Foreign Law.

He is a lawyer licensed to practice law before the Supreme Court (since 1996), and has served as scientific Supervisor at the Athens Bar Association Committee on the modernization of the legal profession. Furthermore, he has appeared as a lawyer before the European Court of Human Rights, in Strasbourg, and the Court of Justice of the European Union, in Luxembourg, while he has also served as arbitrator in many institutional (ICC, LCIA) and ad hoc arbitrations.

He has been elected as a member of the Unidroit (1998, Rome), as well as of many national and foreign scientific institutions, while he has actively participated in many legal conferences. He has also served as the representative of the Hellenic Republic in the Hague Conference on Private International Law (HCCH) as well as the UNCITRAL.

As a lawyer, he specializes in Private International Law, International Business Transactions, International Arbitration and Alternative Dispute Resolution. He has experience in mediation and negotiations in international commercial disputes and in drafting legislation in the field of offshore companies, international sales, and privatizations. He had served as a regular member of the Special Court (hearing cases on miscarriage of justice and the salaries of Justices). He had been a member of the Greek Committee of Nationality and of the Special Supreme Court.

Today, he is considered one of the pre-eminent lawyers in international litigation and is a founding partner of PMN-Pamboukis – Maravelis- Nikolaidis & Associates law firm (Alpha Law), a boutique law firm specializing in international transactions and international arbitration.

As of August 2025, he is a Member of the Institute of International Law (Institut de Droit International).

=== Academic career ===
In 1991, he was unanimously elected as lecturer at the Athens Law School and since October 2009, upon unanimous election, he has been a Professor of Private International Law and International Business Transactions at the Athens Law School.

He taught at the undergraduate and postgraduate level, the courses of Private International Law, International Business Transactions and International Arbitration. From 2014 until his retirement, he oversaw and guided the Athens Law School teams participating in the Willem C. Vis International Commercial Arbitration Moot.

In 2003, he delivered a special course at the Hague Academy of International Law, under the title “Droit international privé holistique: droit uniforme et droit international privé”, which was published in the essays of the Hague Academy of International Law in 2008.

In 2017, he taught the Special Course at the Arbitration Academy of International Law, under the title: ‘The annulled arbitral award’.

During the winter semester of 2024 he was a visiting professor at the Paris I – Panthéon-Sorbonne University.

In the summer of 2024 he revisited the Hague Academy of International Law, delivering the general course under the title "The metamorphoses of the private international law" (‘Les métamorphoses en droit international privé', in french).

In June 2025, he retired from the Athens Law School, delivering his final lecture as a full Professor on the topic of “The Value Dimension of Private International Law”. In this lecture, he delved into the transformations of Private International Law, the evolution of the concept of international justice in private law, and the enduring relevance of interpretative choices in the context of the globalization of law.

Haris Pamboukis takes part in a range of academic activities and regularly attends conferences on private international law.

=== Political career ===
He has served as special counsel to the Deputy Minister of Foreign Affairs (1996-1997) and subsequently as General Secretary of Administration and Organisation at the Ministry of Foreign Affairs (1999—2000), under the Prime Minister, George Papandreou. During that period (1999), he participated in the preparation of the Helsinki Summit (which was very important for the Greek-Turkish relations) and the Copenhagen Conference, where the unconditional admission of Cyprus into the EU was decided.

In October 2009, he was appointed as Minister of State in the government of George Papandreou. In 2010, he was credited as the key architect of the geopolitical plan to open channels of cooperation with the BRICS countries (particularly Russia and China), the Arab world, and Israel.

As Minister, he publicly advocated for political unity and civic dialogue. In an interview with Ethnos newspaper, he proposed the establishment of a Marshall-style development program. He also highlighted overregulation and poor legislative practices as major challenges, recommending a comprehensive plan to streamline the legal framework and restore the rule of law.

He also suggested the creation of a distinguished authority under the Prime Minister, a type of Ministry under the Prime Minister, a plan that was never completed, as well as a complete plan on continuous governance.

During the government reshuffle in September 2010, his responsibilities focused on attracting foreign strategic investments. In this capacity, he construed the law on fast-track (which also reflects his political philosophy on growth), which limited the bureaucracy and facilitated large investments. In the field of attracting investments, he signed a memorandum of cooperation with Qatar worth 5 billion eur, in New York. He also prepared the exploitation of the Ellinikon area (the former airport near Athens). Last but not least, he contributed to the determination of the compensation due incurred by Siemens for moral damages to the Greek state.

He also conceived and coordinated the drafting of the laws on transparency, as well as the reform of the Greek Insolvency Code (specifically former Article 99).

In June 2011, he was appointed as Deputy Minister of Mercantile Shipping and suggested the recovery of the Ministry of Mercantile, a proposal that was not accepted. On 25 August 2011, he resigned from his post in the Government.

His resignation was received positively by both the media and the public. Although he is not currently active in politics, he continues to be widely respected for his intellect, expertise, and integrity in both political and social spheres.

=== Other activities ===
Professor Haris Pamboukis has given numerous interviews in the Greek and International media, among others, in Bloomberg, CNN, ARTE and Fox China. He has also written articles for almost all prestigious Greek newspapers, as well as in the French Le Monde, Huffington Post and others. He has also co-written with Jacques Attali.

He has published his opinion on public and political affairs in four books:

- "On Hope" - A Greek national plan to overcome economic crisis, Ant. Livanis Publications, 2016
- "Logos Koinos" (Common Sense), Ant. Livanis Publications, 2007
- "Higher Education of the Future", Ant. Livanis Publications, 2007.
- "Three aspirations", Ant. Livanis Publications, 2006.

He is a Member of the Boards of Directors of the Greek Companies DANAOS Corporation, AKTOR Group of Companies (since 2022), Alter Ego Media (since 2024), and the Hellenic Airport (since 2016).

Finally, he has been awarded the Honorary Distinction "Légion d’honneur - commandeur" by the President of the French Republic.

=== Legal bibliography ===
A shortened list of his academic works includes:

- Arbitration, Nomiki Vivliothiki Publications, 2024 (in Greek).
- Methodology of Private International Law, 2nd ed., Nomiki Vivliothiki Publications, 2021 (in Greek).
- Private International Law, Nomiki Vivliothiki Publications, 2020, 992 pages (in Greek).
- Recognition and Enforcement of foreign arbitral awards under the New York Convention (1958), Nomiki Vivliothiki Publications, 2019 (in Greek).
- EU Succession Regulation No 650/2012, A Commentary (Editor), Nomiki Vivliothiki Publications / Nomos / Beck, 2017 (in English).
- Law of International Transactions, Nomiki Vivliothiki Publications, 2009 (in Greek).
- Droit international privé holistique : droit uniforme et droit international privé, RCADI Tome 330, 9-474, 2008 (in French).
- Lex Mercatoria as the law applicable to international contracts, Ant. N. Sakkoulas publications, 1996 (in Greek).
- L’acte public étranger en droit international privé, pref. P. Lagarde, Paris, LGDJ, p. 360+xxii, 1993 (in French).
- Le contrat de transfert de techniques en droit international privé, Athènes, PUG, 1990, 91p.
