= Aristeidis Dimitratos =

Greek politician (1902–1986)

Aristeidis Dimitratos (Greek: Αριστείδης Δημητράτος) (1902–1986) was a Greek trade union functionary and politician. Dimitratos was a founding member of the Socialist Workers' Party of Greece (SEKE), precursor to the Communist Party of Greece (KKE) and General Secretary of the General Confederation of Greek Workers (GSEE). Dimitratos flipped from the left wing to the right wing during the dictatorial regime of Ioannis Metaxas, serving as Minister of Labor from 1936 to 1941. During the Axis occupation of Greece, Dimitratos fled the country, remaining as Minister of Labor in the Greek government in exile until dismissed in February 1942 in a move to liberalize that body.

After spending the rest of World War II in the United States, where he cooperated with American military intelligence, Dimitratos returned to Greece in September 1945. He was elected as a parliamentary deputy in 1946 and again from 1956 to 1961 under the banner of the right wing National Radical Union (ERE), serving again as Minister of Labor from 1958 to 1961.

== Biography ==
=== Early years ===
Aristeidis Dimitratos was born in Cefalonia, Greece on January 31, 1902, into a family of intellectuals. Dimitratos attended primary school in his native Cefalonia before moving to Athens, where he attended secondary school.

During his school years in Athens, Dimitratos became active in the Greek labor movement, becoming active in the Socialist youth movement and agitating among the country's tobacco workers.

=== Left-wing politician ===
In 1918 Aristeides Dimitratos was a founding member of the Socialist Workers' Party of Greece (SEKE), direct forerunner of the Communist Party of Greece (KKE). Aristeides' commitment to the Greek radical movement was shared by his brother Nikos Dimitratos and his cousin Panagis Dimitratos, the two of whom served consecutively as the first and second General Secretaries of the SEKE.

Ariseides was elected Secretary of the Socialist Federation of Youth in Greece, youth section of the SEKE, in 1919. He moved his membership to the Communist Party of Greece when that organization was established from the SEKE.

In 1926 Dimitratos was elected head of the General Confederation of Greek Workers (GSEE) for Macedonia and Thrace. He remained active in the Greek Communist movement until 1928, at which time he left the party and began to concentrate his activities as a moderate trade union functionary. He was elected General Secretary of the GSEE in 1929 and re-elected as the national head of that organization in 1933.

=== Right-wing politician ===
During the first half of the 1930s, Dimitratos' politics moved from radicalism towards conservative nationalism and staunch anti-communism. In the summer of 1936 General Ioannis Metaxas seized power in a coup d'etat, installing a new right-wing government remembered as the 4th of August Regime. Aristeides Dimitratos was tapped as Minister of Labor by Metaxas, and he remained in that capacity until the Nazi invasion of Greece in April 1941.

Following the German invasion, the Metaxas regime went into exile, with Dimitratos remaining as Minister of Labor of this shadow government until he was dismissed in February 1942 as part of an effort to make the government-in-exile more liberal and representative of all political tendencies in Greek society. Dimitratos would spend the duration of the war in the United States, where he worked in cooperation with American military intelligence in 1944 and 1945.

Dimitratos returned to Greece in September 1945 where he immediately sought to regain control of the GSEE. The GSEE declined to reelect the former Metaxas official as its head, however, and Dimitratos was forced to make his own political way, helping to establish a new extreme right wing Labor Party, gaining election to the national parliament as deputy from Cefalonia under the banner of this new organization.

During the 1950s, Dimitratos became active in the right wing National Radical Union (ERE). He lost his bid for parliament in the elections of 1950 and 1951, but scored victories under the ERE banner in the elections of 1956, 1958, and 1961. In the 1958 cabinet of Konstantinos Karamanlis, Dimitratos was once again made Minister of Labor, remaining in that capacity until the end of the cabinet's tenure in 1961.

Aristeidis Dimitratos died in 1986.
