= Ministry of Health (Greece) =

Government ministry of Greece

- Υπουργείο Υγείας

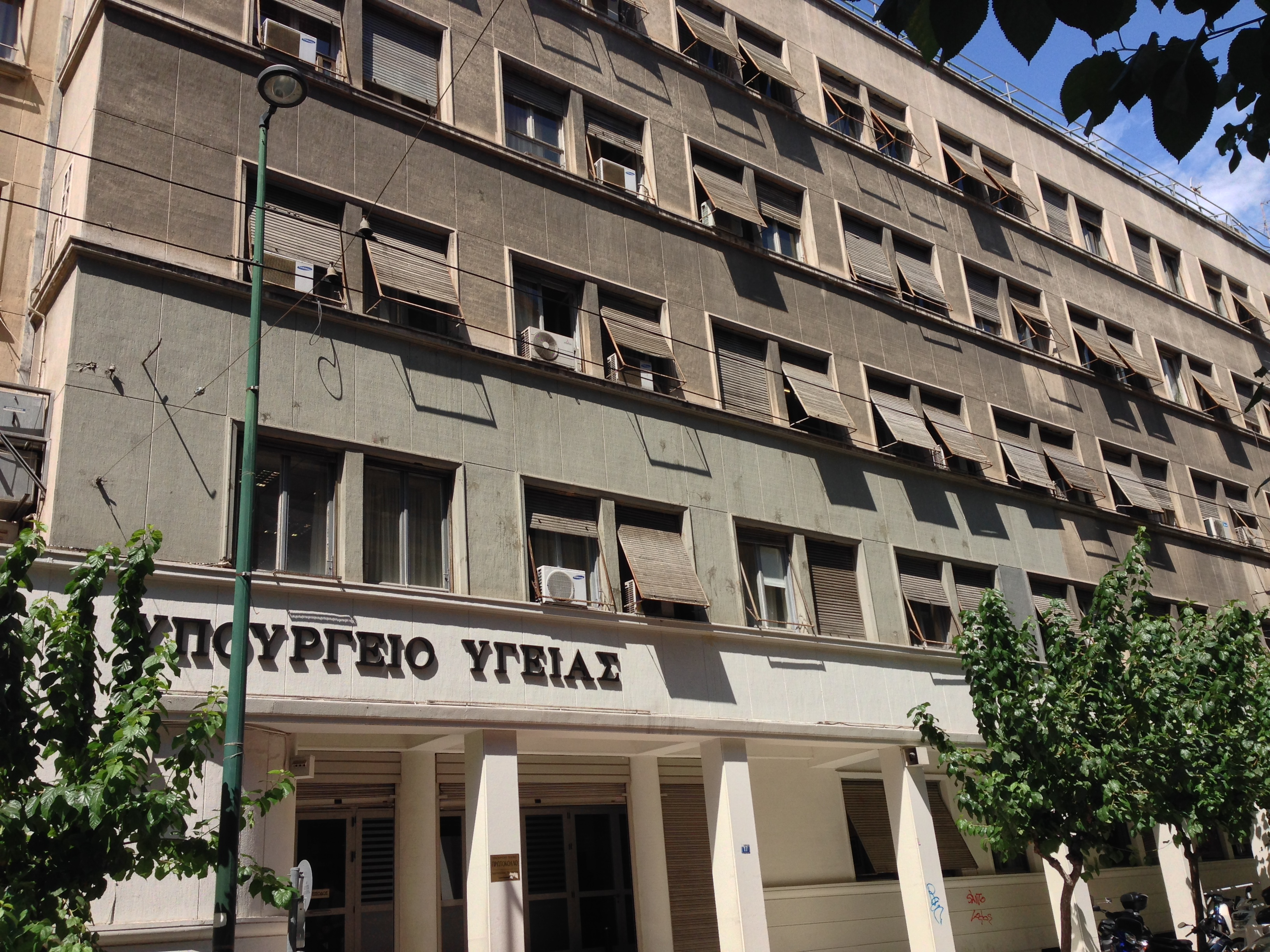
- Headquarters of the Ministry at Aristotelous street

Agency overview
- Formed: March 21, 2015
- Preceding agencies: Ministry for Health and Social Insurance (January - March 2015); Ministry of Health and Social Solidarity (2004 - 2012); Ministry of Health and Welfare (2004 - 1995)
- Jurisdiction: Government of Greece
- Headquarters: Athens
- Employees: 70.582 (2023); 94.164 (2012)
- Annual budget: 7.177.424.000 € (2025)
- Ministers responsible: Adonis Georgiadis; Ireni Agapidaki (alternate minister)
- Deputy Minister responsible: Marios Themistokleous
- Child agencies: General Secretariat for health services; General Secretariat for public health; General Secretariat for strategic planning
- Website: www.moh.gov.gr

The Ministry of Health (Greek: Υπουργείο Υγείας) is the government department responsible for managing the health system of Greece. The incumbent minister is Adonis Georgiadis.

== Historical background ==
The first systematic efforts to organize Greece's health services began during King Otto's reign, with the establishment of the country's initial health service in 1833. Named the "Hygienic Department," it was one of six departments within the newly formed Ministry of the Interior and was tasked with overseeing public health. From 1894 to 1914, the central administrative body for health services was the "Directorate of Public Hygiene and Perception", also under the Ministry of the Interior. Until 1914, no significant steps were taken to expand health services, as national resources and budget were primarily allocated to preparing a robust military. However, following the Balkan Wars, increased state attention was directed toward addressing the needs of retired soldiers. Consequently, in 1917, previously fragmented health and welfare services were consolidated under a new entity: the "Ministry of Social Welfare". This ministry was responsible for providing care to war victims, orphans, refugees, and families of conscripted soldiers.
In December 1922, after Asia Minor Catastrophe the Gonatas government established the "Ministry of Health, Welfare, and Assistance", which absorbed the "Ministry of Social Welfare" created in 1917. Since then, the Ministry of Health has typically encompassed social welfare and, from around 1970, social insurance.

Today, however, social welfare responsibilities and social security functions have been reassigned to the Ministry of Labour and Social Security.

The longest serving Minister of Health was Spiros Doxiadis, Minister of Health in the governments of Constantine Karamanlis, who served for a total of 48 months and 5 days.

== List of ministers ==
=== Health and Social Solidarity (2004–2012) ===
Name	Took office	Left office	Party	Notes
Nikitas Kaklamanis	10 March 2004	15 February 2006	New Democracy	First Cabinet of Kostas Karamanlis
Dimitris Avramopoulos	15 February 2006	7 October 2009	New Democracy	First and Second Cabinet of Kostas Karamanlis
Mariliza Xenogiannakopoulou	7 October 2009	7 September 2010	PASOK	Cabinet of George Papandreou
Andreas Loverdos	7 September 2010	17 May 2012	PASOK	Cabinet of George Papandreou until 11 November 2011; Cabinet of Lucas Papademos thereafter
Christos Kittas	17 May 2012	21 June 2012	Independent	Caretaker Cabinet of Panayiotis Pikrammenos

=== Health (2012–2015) ===
Name	Took office	Left office	Party	Notes
Andreas Lykourentzos	21 June 2012	25 June 2013	New Democracy	Cabinet of Antonis Samaras
Adonis Georgiadis	25 June 2013	10 June 2014	New Democracy	Cabinet of Antonis Samaras
Makis Voridis	10 June 2014	27 January 2015	New Democracy	Cabinet of Antonis Samaras

=== Health, Social Security and Social Solidarity (January 2015–September 2015) ===
Name	Took office	Left office	Party	Notes
Panagiotis Kouroumplis	27 January 2015	27 August 2015	Syriza	First Cabinet of Alexis Tsipras
Athanasios Dimopoulos	28 August 2015	21 September 2015	Independent	Caretaker Cabinet of Vassiliki Thanou-Christophilou

=== Health (since September 2015) ===
Name	Took office	Left office	Party	Notes
Andreas Xanthos	23 September 2015	9 July 2019	Syriza	Second Cabinet of Alexis Tsipras
Vasilis Kikilias	9 July 2019	31 August 2021	New Democracy	First Cabinet of Kyriakos Mitsotakis
Thanos Plevris	31 August 2021	26 May 2023	New Democracy	First Cabinet of Kyriakos Mitsotakis
Anastasia Kotanidou	26 May 2023	27 June 2023	Independent	Caretaker Cabinet of Ioannis Sarmas
Michalis Chrisochoidis	27 June 2023	4 January 2024	New Democracy	Second Cabinet of Kyriakos Mitsotakis
Adonis Georgiadis	4 January 2024	incumbent	New Democracy	Second Cabinet of Kyriakos Mitsotakis

== See also ==
- Health care in Greece
- List of hospitals in Greece
- Panhellenic Association of Ergotherapists
