= Giannis Ragousis =

Greek economist and politician

Giannis Ragousis MP
- Γιάννης Ραγκούσης
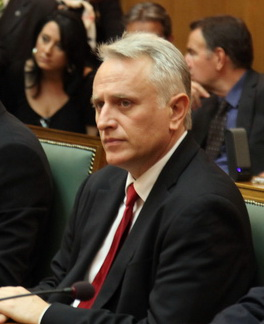

Alternate Minister for National Defence
- In office 11 November 2011 – 17 May 2012

Minister for Infrastructure, Transport and Networks
- In office 17 June 2011 – 11 November 2011
- President: Karolos Papoulias
- Prime Minister: George Papandreou
- Preceded by: Dimitris Reppas
- Succeeded by: Makis Voridis

Minister of the Interior
- In office 7 October 2009 – 17 June 2011
- President: Karolos Papoulias
- Prime Minister: George Papandreou
- Preceded by: Prokopis Pavlopoulos
- Succeeded by: Haris Kastanidis

Member of the Hellenic Parliament
- In office 7 July 2019 – 25 June 2023
- Constituency: Piraeus B

Personal details
- Born: 11 December 1965 (age 60) Athens, Greece
- Party: SYRIZA (2019-present), Panhellenic Socialist Movement (2007-2012)
- Other political affiliations: Movement for Change
- Spouse: Katerina Roussou (divorced) Marina Kontotoli (m. 2025)
- Children: 3
- Education: Aristotle University of Thessaloniki; Sussex University
- Profession: Economist and politician

Giannis Ragousis (Greek: Γιάννης Ραγκούσης; born 11 December 1965) is a Greek economist and politician of SYRIZA who had previously served in the government of Panhellenic Socialist Movement.

== Education ==
Giannis Ragousis graduated from the Department of Financial Studies of the Aristotle University of Thessaloniki with a major in economics. He completed his studies with a master's degree in Financial Development from the University of Sussex, U.K.. Giannis Ragousis is fluent in English.

== Politics ==
Giannis Ragousis, was a member of the Rectors Council, as well as the F.E.A.P.TH. from 1986, until 1989. From 1991 to 1993 he was the Secretary of PA.S.P., the youth division of the Panhellenic Socialist Movement (PASOK), as well as a member of the Central Council of the National Students Union of Greece (E.F.E.E.).

Giannis Ragousis was a member of the Central Committee of PASOK from 1994 until 1996. In 2003, he was elected Mayor of Paros, a post he held until 2007.

He was first elected to the Hellenic Parliament on 16 September 2007, having been appointed party spokesman on 15 August.

After the 2009 election, George Papandreou made Ragousis his Minister for the Interior, Decentralization and e-Governance. He kept the post until a cabinet reshuffle on 17 June 2011, when he was appointed Minister for Infrastructure, Transport and Networks. On 11 November 2011, he became the Alternate Minister for National Defence in the national unity government of Lucas Papademos. He challenged Fofi Gennimata as leader of Movement for Change after the dissolution of Panhellenic Socialist Movement, before becoming a candidate of SYRIZA for the 2019 Greek legislative election.

== Personal life ==
Giannis Ragousis was married to Katerina Roussou. They have a son, Nicolas and two daughters, Irene and Vassiliki.On December 26, 2025, he married the Trikala MP, Marina Kontotoli .

== Sources ==
- Biography, Hellenic Parliament website (in English)
- Giannis Ragousis in the Economist Conference
- Giannis Ragousis in the International Conference on e-government
- Giannis Ragousis in TedXAthens

Political offices
Preceded by Prokopis Pavlopoulos	Minister for the Interior, Decentralization and e-Governance; 7 October 2009 – 17 June 2011	Succeeded by Haris Kastanidis
Preceded by Dimitris Reppas	Minister for Infrastructure, Transport and Networks; 17 June 2011 – 11 November 2011	Succeeded by Makis Voridis
