= Giorgos Koutroumanis =

Greek politician

Minister of Labour and Social Security
- In office 17 June 2011 – 17 May 2012
- Preceded by: Louka Katseli
- Succeeded by: Antonis Roupakiotis

Personal details
- Born: 1955 (age 70–71) Neochori Kalavrita
- Party: Panhellenic Socialist Movement
- Spouse: Vasiliki Sotiropoulou
- Children: 1
- Education: University of Athens

George Koutroumanis (born 1955) is a Greek politician with the Panhellenic Socialist Movement and served as Minister of Labour and Social Security from 17 June 2011 to 17 May 2012 and has been working in the social security sector since 1984. After leaving his ministerial position, Koutroumanis remains a vocal figure in Greek fiscal politics.

== Early life and education ==
He was born in Neochori Kalavrita in 1955. Being a member of a farmers' family with many children, he spent his early years in Kalavrita and Patra. In 1973 he moved to Athens and while working in the private sector he continued his studies in mathematics at the University of Athens.

== Family ==
He is married to Vasiliki Sotiropoulou and he is the father to a son.
