= Government of Greece =

Government of the Hellenic Republic
- Central government
- Coat of arms of Greece

Overview
- State: Greece
- Leader: Prime Minister (Kyriakos Mitsotakis)
- Appointed by: President of the Republic (Konstantinos Tasoulas)
- Main organ: Ministerial Council
- Ministries: 20
- Responsible to: Parliament of the Hellenes
- Headquarters: Maximos Mansion
- Website: www.government.gov.gr

The Government of Greece, (Note: Greek: Κυβέρνηση της Ελλάδας, romanized: Kyvérnisi tis Helládas) officially the Government of the Hellenic Republic, (Note: Κυβέρνηση της Ελληνικής Δημοκρατίας, Kyvérnisi tis Hellinikís Dimokratías) is the collective body of the Greek state responsible for defining and directing the general policy of the country. It exercises the executive powers alongside the president of the republic and it is constituted by the cabinet which is composed by the prime minister, the ministers, and the deputy ministers.

Other collective government bodies—apart from the Ministerial Council—are the Committee on Institutions, the Government Council for Foreign Affairs and Defence and others, which manage particular government policy issues.

== See also ==
- List of cabinets of Greece
- List of members of the Hellenic Parliament, June 2023
- List of ministries of Greece
- List of prime ministers of Greece
- Second Cabinet of Kyriakos Mitsotakis
