= Christos Papoutsis =

Greek politician (born 1953)

- Χρήστος Παπουτσής
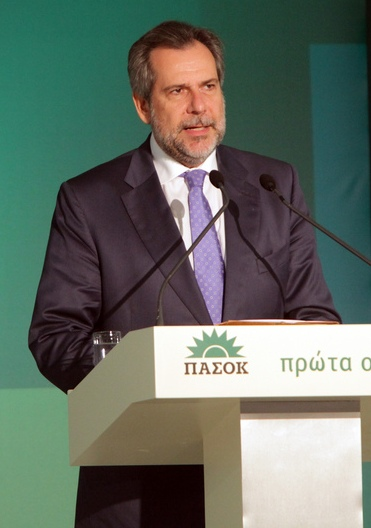
- Papoutsis in 2009

Member of the Hellenic Parliament
- In office 9 April 2000 – 6 May 2012

Minister for Citizen Protection
- In office 7 September 2010 – 7 March 2012
- Preceded by: Michalis Chrisochoidis
- Succeeded by: Michalis Chrisochoidis

Secretary of the Parliamentary Group and Parliamentary Spokesman
- In office November 2009 – September 2010
- Prime Minister: George Papandreou
- Preceded by: Dimitris Reppas
- Succeeded by: Vasilios Exarchos

Minister of Mercantile Marine
- In office April 13, 2000 – October 24, 2001
- Prime Minister: Costas Simitis
- Preceded by: Stavros Soumakis
- Succeeded by: Georgios Anomeritis

European Commissioner for Energy
- In office January 1995 – September 1999
- President: Jacques Santer
- Preceded by: Abel Matutes
- Succeeded by: Loyola de Palacio

Personal details
- Born: April 11, 1953 (age 73) Larissa, Greece
- Party: Panhellenic Socialist Movement (PASOK)
- Education: National and Kapodistrian University of Athens
- Profession: Politician
- Website: cpapoutsis.gr

Christos Papoutsis (Greek: Χρήστος Παπουτσής; born April 11, 1953) is a Greek socialist politician who has served as Minister for Citizen Protection (2010–12), Mercantile Marine Minister (2000–01) Member of the European Parliament (1984–95) and European Commissioner for Energy and Euratom Supply Agency, Small business and Tourism (1995–1999). He has also served as the Secretary of the Parliamentary Group and Parliamentary Spokesman for the Panhellenic Socialist Movement (PASOK), the majority party in Greece (2009–2010). He also was candidate for Mayor of Athens (2002).

== Early life and education ==
He was born in Larissa, Greece, in 1953 and later moved to Athens where he studied Economics at the National and Kapodistrian University. After his university years he became politically active in the Democratic Movement against the Greek military junta – dictatorship- of 1967–1974.

== Political career ==
On July 12, 2013, he was appointed as Greece's Representative to the World Bank.

=== 2010-2012 Minister of Citizen Protection ===
He served as Minister of Citizen Protection responsible for the national security of the country, with the PASOK government serving under Prime Minister George Papandreou (2010-2011), and in the coalition government under Prime Minister Lucas Papademos (2011-2012).

=== 2000-2012 Member of the Greek Parliament ===
Member of the Greek Parliament for Athens (PASOK party) through four general elections (2000, 2004, 2007, 2009), following his return to Greece after 16 years of serving in the European Institutions.
During this period held the positions of:

- Secretary of PASOK parliamentary group(2009-2010).
- Parliamentary Spokesman (2007–2010) of the President of PASOK George Papandreou.
- Vice Chairman of the Parliamentary Committee on European Affairs. Member of the Parliamentary Committee on Foreign Affairs and Defense policy.
- Member of the Committee on Economic Policy.
- Member of the Parliamentary Committee on Production and Trade.
- Member of the Committee on Environmental Protection.

Since 2000 he has been elected consecutively member of the Hellenic Parliament with PASOK (2000, 2004, 2007 and 2009 elections).

==== 2002 Candidate for Mayor of Athens ====
In 2002 he was a candidate for Mayor of Athens in the local elections. As Leader of the Opposition he served in the Municipal Council Athens (2002–2006).

==== 2000-2001 Minister of Mercantile Marine ====
Minister of Mercantile Marine in the Government of PASOK under Prime Minister Costas Simitis.

=== 1995-1999 European Commissioner ===
He was appointed European Commissioner for Energy under the Santer Presidency, with an extended portfolio pertaining to Energy, EURATOM Supply Agency, SMEs, Tourism and Social Economy. During his mandate he put forward a series of policies in the areas of Green Energy, Enterprise Policy, Commerce, Tourism and Social Economy.

During 1995 to 1999 held the following positions/had the following responsibilities:

- European Commissioner under the Presidency of the European Commission by Jacques Santer.
- Responsible for Energy Policy and EURATOM Supply Agency, Enterprise Policy, Commerce, Tourism and Social Economy.
- Represented the European Commission at the E.U. Councils of Ministers for Energy and for Competitiveness, the OECD Council of Ministers and the G8.

=== 1984-1995 Member of the European Parliament ===
From 1984 to 1995, he was elected Member of the European Parliament for three consecutive terms (1984, 1989, 1994). During this period he held the positions of Vice-President of the Socialist Group of the European Parliament (1987–1994) and Head of PASOK MEP delegation in the European Parliament (1989–1994).

Along with his mandate in the European Parliament, he served as International Relations Secretary and PASOK Representative at the Socialist International, from 1988 to 1994.

During 1984 - 1995 period held the following positions:

- Vice president of the Parliamentary Group of the European Socialist Party at the European Parliament (1987-1994).
- Head of PASOK MEP’s (1987-1994).
- Member of the Budget Committee.
- Member of the Committee on Economic, Monetary and Industrial Policy.
- Member of the Committee on Foreign Affairs, Security and Defense Policy.
- Member of the Inter-parliamentary delegation E.P.-USA Congress on relations between the European Union and the U.S. (1990 – 1995).
- Vice-President of the Inter-Parliamentary delegation E.P.-Canada (1984 – 1989).

== Publications ==
- European Destinations (Greek: Ευρωπαϊκές Διαδρομές), by Christos Papoutsis, 1994, ISBN 960-236-433-5
- The Colour of the Future (Greek: Το Χρώμα του Μέλλοντος), by Christos Papoutsis, 1998, ISBN 960-14-0006-0
- For Europe in the 21st Century (Greek: Για την Ευρώπη του 21ου Αιώνα), by Christos Papoutsis, 1999, ISBN 960-14-0154-7

Political offices
Preceded by Michalis Chrisochoidis	Minister for Citizen Protection; 2010–2012	Succeeded by Michalis Chrisochoidis
Preceded by Dimitris Reppas	Secretary of the Parliamentary Group and Parliamentary Spokesman for the majority party 2009–2010	Succeeded by Vasilios Exarchos
Preceded by Stavros Soumakis	Minister of Mercantile Marine; 2000–2001	Succeeded by Georgios Anomeritis
Preceded by Ioannis Paleokrassas	Greek European Commissioner; 1995–1999	Succeeded by Anna Diamantopoulou
Preceded by Abel Matutes	European Commissioner for Energy; 1995–1999	Succeeded by Loyola de Palacio
