= Legal Entity of Public Law =

According to the article 101 of the Constitution of Greece "The administration of the State shall be organized according to the principle of decentralization" and therefore the organization of the State includes both central and decentralized bodies. As central bodies we can refer to the Government, the Prime Minister as a single body of the State, the Ministries with their ministers and finally the big bodies of Administration such as the Council of State, the Independent Governing Authorities and the State Council of Law. Similarly, as decentralized bodies can be considered the Decentralized Administrations, the elected Regions and Municipalities, which are recognized by a decree issued by a proposal of the Minister of Interior Public Administration and Decentralization. In a broad sense, organizations that have elected administrations by the people can be considered as LEPLs, since although they are enshrined in the Constitution, the autonomy of Local Authorities is not envisaged, such as the legislative power of their bodies (ie, to establish autonomous rules of law).

There are also a number of legal entities that are established by the self-governing bodies and serve a specific and specialized purpose. Among these we can mention Hospitals, Public Higher Educational Faculties, Public Libraries and a number of other entities that fall within the full range of Public Administration (e.g. Public Law Offices of the Ministry of Agriculture and a series of other entities by other Ministries).

The LEPL are established and abolished only by an act of the authorized Legislative Body. They enjoy administrative and sometimes financial autonomy and are usually run by multimember boards. In other cases it is envisaged to have a second executive cooperative body (e.g. executive or steering committee).
