= Michalis Chrisochoidis =

Greek politician

- Μιχάλης Χρυσοχοΐδης
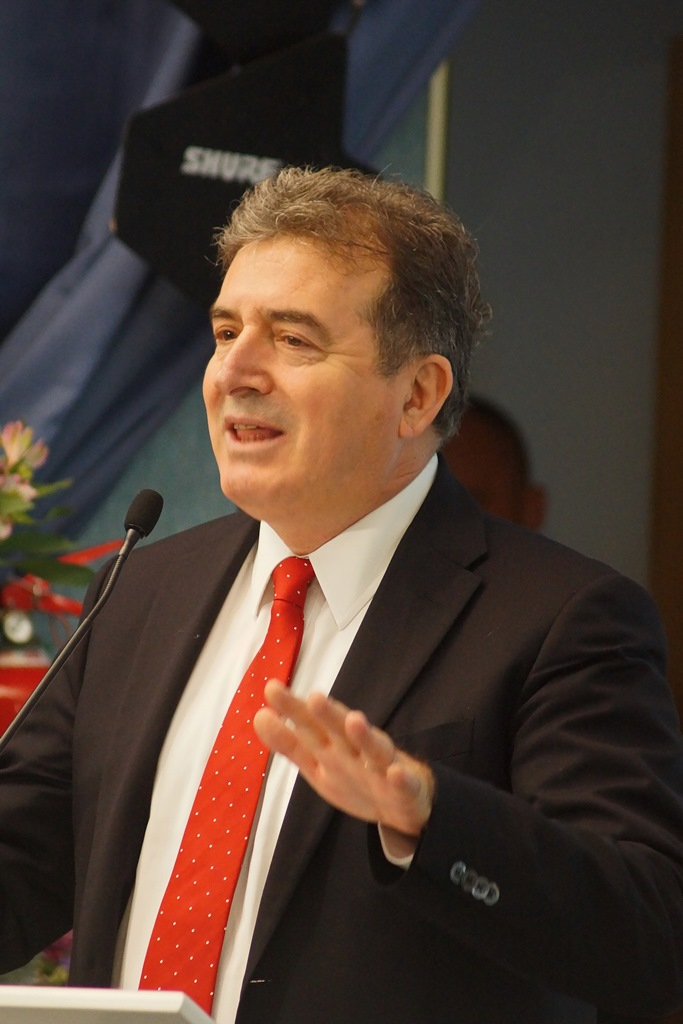
- Chrisochoidis in 2014

Minister for Citizen Protection
- Incumbent
- Assumed office 4 January 2024
- Prime Minister: Kyriakos Mitsotakis
- Preceded by: Giannis Oikonomou
- In office 9 July 2019 – 31 August 2021
- Prime Minister: Kyriakos Mitsotakis
- Preceded by: Olga Gerovasili
- Succeeded by: Takis Theodorikakos
- In office 7 March 2012 – 17 May 2012
- Prime Minister: Lucas Papademos
- Preceded by: Christos Papoutsis
- Succeeded by: Eleftherios Oikonomou
- In office 7 October 2009 – 7 September 2010
- Prime Minister: George Papandreou
- Preceded by: Spyridon Flogaitis (Interior)
- Succeeded by: Christos Papoutsis

Minister for Health
- In office 27 June 2023 – 4 January 2024
- Prime Minister: Kyriakos Mitsotakis
- Preceded by: Anastasia Kotanidou
- Succeeded by: Adonis Georgiadis

Minister for Infrastructure, Transport and Networks
- In office 25 June 2013 – 27 January 2015
- Prime Minister: Antonis Samaras
- Preceded by: Kostis Hatzidakis (Development, Competitiveness, Infrastructure, Transport and Networks)
- Succeeded by: Giorgos Stathakis (Economy, Infrastructure, Shipping and Tourism)

Minister for Development, Competitiveness and Shipping
- In office 7 September 2010 – 7 March 2012
- Prime Minister: George Papandreou; Lucas Papademos
- Preceded by: Louka Katseli (Economy, Competitiveness and Shipping)
- Succeeded by: Anna Diamantopoulou

Minister for Public Order
- In office 19 February 1999 – 7 July 2003
- Prime Minister: Costas Simitis
- Preceded by: Filippos Petsalnikos
- Succeeded by: Giorgos Floridis

Personal details
- Born: 31 October 1955 (age 70) Imathia, Greece
- Party: PASOK (1974–2019); Independent (2019–2022); New Democracy (since 2022)
- Education: University of Thessaloniki
- Website: chrisochoidis.gr

Michalis Chrisochoidis (Greek: Μιχάλης Χρυσοχοΐδης, born 31 October 1955) is a Greek politician and member of the Hellenic Parliament for the Athens B2 constituency with New Democracy. He currently serves as Minister for Citizen Protection in the Second Cabinet of Kyriakos Mitsotakis. He had served in the same role on four occasions (1999–2003, 2009–2010, 2012 and 2019–2021), as a member of PASOK and an independent politician. He has also served as Minister for the Economy, Competitiveness and Shipping (2010), Minister for Regional Development and Competitiveness (2010–2011), Minister for Development, Competitiveness and Shipping (2011–2012), Minister for Infrastructure, Transport and Networks (2013–2015) and Minister for Health (2023–2024).

== Life ==
Michalis Chrisochoidis was born on 31 October 1955, in the village of Nisi near Alexandreia in Imathia, Greece.

He graduated from the Law School of the Aristotle University of Thessaloniki. He started practicing law as an attorney in Veria in 1981.

In 1974, Chrisochoidis joined PASOK. Ηe served as prefect of Karditsa prefecture from 1987 to 1989. From June 1989 until PASOK's electoral collapse due to the Greek government-debt crisis, he was elected to parliament at every election, initially for Imathia (1989–2004) and from 2007 for the Athens B constituency. He failed to be returned to parliament at the January 2015 election.

Chrisochoidis was first appointed to government as the Deputy Minister for Trade (1994–1996). He subsequently served as Deputy Minister for Development (1996–1999), Minister for Public Order (1999–2003) and Minister for Citizen Protection (2009–2010). In September 2010, he was appointed Minister for Regional Development and Competitiveness. On 27 June 2011, the ministry merged with the Ministry of Maritime Affairs, Islands and Fisheries to form the Ministry of Development, Competitiveness and Shipping.

During his time at the Ministry of Public Order, the Revolutionary Organization 17 November, a major Greek urban guerrilla or terrorist group was dismantled in 2002, and six suspected members of Revolutionary Struggle were arrested in 2010.

In 1995, Chrisochoidis was appointed to the secretariat of the Party of European Socialists.

On 9 July 2019, Chrisochoidis was appointed Minister for Citizen Protection in the Cabinet of Kyriakos Mitsotakis and was consequently expelled from PASOK and the Movement for Change.

Political offices
Preceded by Filippos Petsalnikos	Minister for Public Order; 1999–2003	Succeeded by Giorgos Floridis
Preceded by Spyridon Flogaitis (Interior) (caretaker)	Minister for Citizen Protection; 2009–2010	Succeeded by Christos Papoutsis
Preceded by Louka Katseli	Minister for the Economy, Competitiveness and Shipping; 2010	Succeeded by himself (Regional Development and Competitiveness)
Preceded by himself (Economy, Competitiveness and Shipping)	Minister for Regional Development and Competitiveness; 2010–2011	Succeeded by himself (Development, Competitiveness and Shipping)
Preceded by himself (Regional Development and Competitiveness)	Minister for Development, Competitiveness and Shipping; 2011–2012	Succeeded by Anna Diamantopoulou
Preceded by Christos Papoutsis	Minister for Citizen Protection; 2012	Succeeded by Eleftherios Oikonomou (caretaker)
Preceded by Kostis Hatzidakis (Development, Competitiveness, Infrastructure, Transport and Networks)	Minister for Infrastructure, Transport and Networks; 2013–2015	Succeeded by Giorgos Stathakis (Economy, Infrastructure, Shipping and Tourism)
Preceded by Olga Gerovasili	Minister for Citizen Protection; 2019–2021	Succeeded by Takis Theodorikakos
Preceded by Anastasia Kotanidou (caretaker)	Minister for Health; 2023–2024	Succeeded by Adonis Georgiadis
Preceded by Giannis Oikonomou	Minister for Citizen Protection; 2024–present	Incumbent
