= Ministry of Labour and Social Security (Greece) =

Government ministry of Greece

- Υπουργείο Εργασίας και Κοινωνικής Ασφάλισης

Agency overview
- Formed: October 1935
- Type: Ministry
- Jurisdiction: Greek government
- Headquarters: Athens; 37°58′54.8″N 23°43′35.8″E
- Employees: 10.540 (2024)
- Annual budget: 18.678.084.000 € (2025)
- Minister responsible: Niki Kerameus
- Deputy Ministers responsible: Kostas karagkounis; Anna Efthymiou, for social security
- Agency executive: Secretary of the Ministry
- Child agency: General Secretariat of labour relations General Secretariat of social security
- Website: https://ypergasias.gov.gr/

The Ministry of Labour and Social Security (Greek: Υπουργείο Εργασίας και Κοινωνικής Ασφάλισης) is a government department of Greece. The Ministry is responsible for the labour market, employment, and social security.

Its current name was given in June 2023 when the second government of Kyriakos Mitsotakis renamed the "Ministry of Labour and Social Affairs" to the "Ministry of Labour and Social Security".

The incumbent minister is Niki Kerameus.

== History ==
The Ministry of Labour was first established in October 1935 by the Kondylis government, following the urging of Georgios Kartalis, who also served as its first Minister.
After one year, in January 1936, the new Demertzis government abolished the ministry.
Following the coup of August 4, 1936, by Ioannis Metaxas, the "Deputy ministry of Labour" was established, under the "Ministry of National Economy", with the responsibility "...to systematically ensure harmonious cooperation between labour and capital, to promote the National Economy and the moral and material upliftment of the working classes."
In November 1936, it was upgraded to an independent Deputy Ministry. Aristeidis Dimitratos, former General Secretary of the GSEE (General Confederation of Greek Workers), who, as a repentant communist, joined the conservative faction during this period, served as Deputy Minister. During his tenure as minister, state control over the labor market was strengthened, many professions were declared "closed" and "protected," and businesses were prohibited from dismissing employees without government approval. At the same time, a minimum daily wage was established, regardless of the days worked, industry-wide labor contracts were systematized, the eight-hour workday was further implemented, and labor legislation was more formally enforced.

With the onset of the military dictatorship, the Ministry of Labor was abolished, and its responsibilities were transferred to the Ministry of National Economy. A deputy minister responsible for employment issues was appointed to oversee these matters. When the Ministry of National Economy was dissolved under the Markezinis government, one of the five ministries that emerged from its dissolution was the Ministry of Employment. This "Ministry of Employment," established for the first time, essentially absorbed the responsibilities of the abolished "Ministry of Labor." It was responsible for implementing government policy on matters concerning the employment of the country's workforce.

In August 1976, the Konstantinos Karamanlis government reinstated the name Ministry of Labour. Konstantinos Laskaris served as the Minister of Labor for all the initial post-dictatorship New Democracy governments, holding the portfolio from November 21, 1974, until October 21, 1981. Laskaris was heavily criticized by the Left, particularly for Law 330/1976, which aimed to control the forms of labor demands, restricting spontaneous worker uprisings and granting increased intervention powers to the executive and judicial authorities.

In September 1995, the social security sector was detached from the Ministry of Health and Welfare, and the corresponding department, the "General Secretariat of Social Security", was incorporated into the Ministry of Labor, where it has remained since. The Ministry was renamed to the Ministry of Labor and Social Security.
In 2001, the government of Costas Simitis attempted a reform in social security policy, mainly in its pension arm, by increasing the retirement age (abolishing the 35-year service requirement and introducing the principle of retirement after 40 years of work), reducing pensions, and cutting early retirements, which sparked significant social unrest. This unrest also arose within the ranks of the ruling party, prompting Costas Simitis to "back down" and indefinitely postpone the reform.

== List of ministers ==
=== Employment and Social Protection (2004–2009) ===
Name	Took office	Left office	Party
Panos Panagiotopoulos	10 March 2004	15 February 2006	New Democracy
Savvas Tsitouridis	15 February 2006	30 April 2007	New Democracy
Vasilios Magginas	30 April 2007	17 December 2007	New Democracy
Fani Palli-Petralia	17 December 2007	7 October 2009	New Democracy

=== Labour and Social Security (2009–2012) ===
Name	Took office	Left office	Party
Andreas Loverdos	7 October 2009	7 September 2010	PASOK
Louka Katseli	7 September 2010	17 June 2011	PASOK
Giorgos Koutroumanis	17 June 2011	17 May 2012	PASOK
Antonis Roupakiotis	17 May 2012	21 June 2012	

=== Labour, Social Security and Welfare (2012–2015) ===
Name	Took office	Left office	Party
Ioannis Vroutsis	21 June 2012	27 January 2015	New Democracy

=== Labour and Social Solidarity (2015) ===
Name	Took office	Left office	Party
Panos Skourletis	27 January 2015	18 July 2015	Syriza

=== Labour, Social Insurance and Social Solidarity (2015–2019) ===
Name	Took office	Left office	Party
Georgios Katrougalos	18 July 2015	27 August 2015	Syriza
Dimitris Moustakas	28 August 2015	21 September 2015	Independent
Georgios Katrougalos	23 September 2015	5 November 2016	Syriza
Effie Achtsioglou	5 November 2016	9 July 2019	Syriza

=== Labour and Social Affairs (2019–2023) ===
Name	Took office	Left office	Party
Giannis Vroutsis	9 July 2019	5 January 2021	New Democracy
Kostis Hatzidakis	5 January 2021	26 May 2023	New Democracy
Patrina Paparrigopoulou	26 May 2023	27 June 2023	

=== Labour and Social Security (2023–present) ===
Name	Took office	Left office	Party
Adonis Georgiadis	27 June 2023	4 January 2024	New Democracy
Domna Michailidou	4 January 2024	14 June 2024	New Democracy
Niki Kerameus	14 June 2024	incumbent	New Democracy
