= Dimitris Reppas =

Greek politician

Dimitris Reppas MP
- Δημήτρης Ρέππας
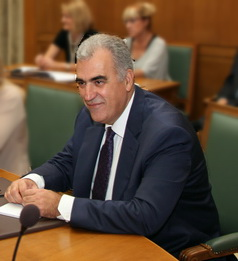

Minister for Administrative Reform
- In office 17 June 2011 – 17 May 2012
- President: Karolos Papoulias
- Prime Minister: George Papandreou

Minister for Infrastructure, Transport and Networks
- In office 7 October 2009 – 17 June 2011
- President: Karolos Papoulias
- Prime Minister: George Papandreou

Personal details
- Born: 6 July 1952 (age 74) Leonidio, Arcadia, Greece
- Party: Movement of Democratic Socialists (since 2015), PASOK (until 2015)
- Education: National and Kapodistrian University of Athens
- Profession: Politician
- Website: www.dimitrisreppas.gr

Dimitris Reppas (Greek: Δημήτρης Ρέππας; born July 6, 1952, in Leonidio, Arcadia) is a Greek politician of the Movement of Democratic Socialists and a current Member of the Hellenic Parliament. From 2009 to 2012 he served as Minister for Infrastructure, Transport and Networks and as the first Minister for Administrative Reform of Greece.

== Life ==
Dimitris Reppas was born in 1952 in Leonidio, Arcadia. He graduated from the School of Dentistry of the National and Kapodistrian University of Athens, and is a member of the Panhellenic Socialist Movement since 1974.

In 1975, he was elected as president of the students union of the Dental School of the National and Kapodistrian University of Athens and as a member of the National Students Union, in the first elections after the end of the Greek military junta of 1967–1974. From 1976 until 1981, he was the Deputy Secretary of the PASOK youth wing.

He was elected as a member of the Hellenic Parliament for the first time in 1981, as a member of Parliament for the prefecture of Arcadia. In 1984, he was elected as a member of the PASOK Central Committee. In 1993, he was a member of the Presidency of PASOK's Parliamentary Group.

In January 1996, he was appointed as Minister for Press and Public Transport as well as the Government Spokesman, a post that he held until 2001.

In October 2001, he was elected as a member of the Executive Office of the PASOK Central Committee. On 24 October 2001, he was appointed as Minister for Employment and Social Security, a position that he held until the elections of March 2004. With PASOK's return to power after the October 2009 elections, Reppas was appointed as the Minister for Infrastructure, Transport and Networks.

On 3 January 2015, it was announced that Reppas would join former prime minister Papandreou in leaving PASOK to found the new Movement of Democratic Socialists.

Dimitris Reppas is fluent in English. He is married with two children.

== Publications ==
- Face to Face with the Media

Political offices
Preceded by Evripidis Stylianidis (as Minister for Transport and Communications)	Minister for Infrastructure, Transport and Networks; 7 October 2009 – 17 June 2011	Succeeded by Giannis Ragousis
New title	Minister for Administrative Reform; 17 June 2011 – 17 Mai 2012	Incumbent
