= Cabinet of Greece =

Collective decision-making body of the Hellenic Republic

The cabinet of Greece, officially called the Ministerial Council (Greek: Yπουργικό Συμβούλιο), constitutes the Government of Greece (Greek: Κυβέρνηση της Ελλάδας). It is the collective decision-making body of the Hellenic Republic, composed of the Prime Minister and the Ministers. One or more Ministers may be appointed Vice President of the Government (Αντιπρόεδρος της Κυβερνήσεως, Deputy Prime Minister), by decree initiated by the Prime Minister. Ministers are appointed by the President on the advice of the Prime Minister.

The Council defines and directs the general policy of the Country, in accordance with the provisions of the Constitution and the laws. It is regulated by the Constitution of Greece.

The Council meets at the building of the Maximos Mansion since July 2019. The meetings are chaired by the Prime Minister.

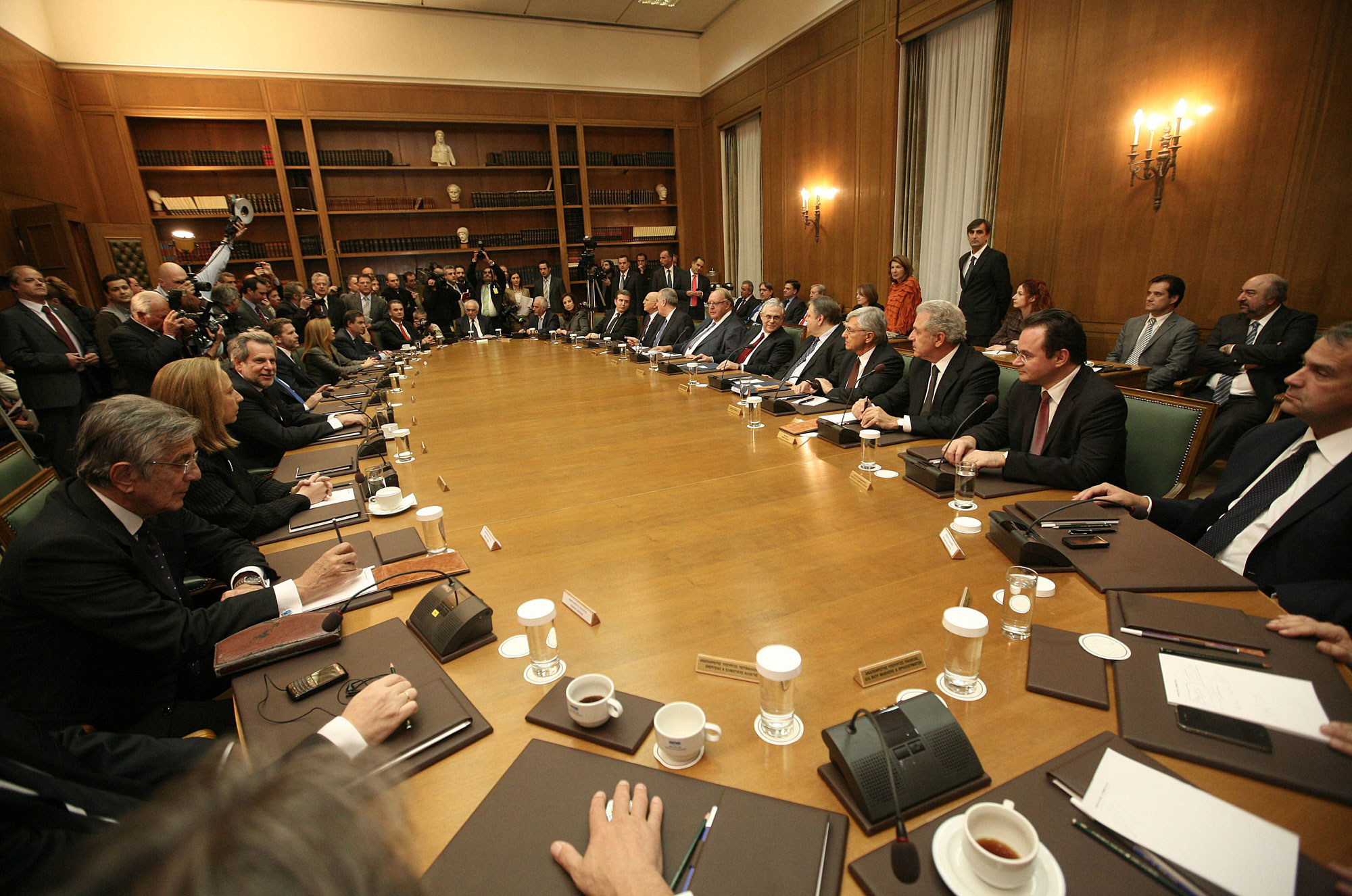
Cabinet of 2012

== Formation of government ==
After the elections, the President appoints the Prime Minister and hands him the mandate to form a government. He suggests the new Ministers and Deputy Ministers and the new government gets appointed by the President in a swearing-in ceremony with the Archbishop of Athens at the Presidential Mansion in Athens.

== See also ==
- List of cabinets of Greece

== Sources ==
- "THE CONSTITUTION OF GREECE - As revised by the parliamentary resolution of 27 May2008 of the VIIIth Revisionary Parliament" (PDF). Hellenic Parliament. Archived from the original (PDF) on 2009-11-22.
