= Ministry of Development (Greece) =

Government ministry of Greece

- Υπουργείο Ανάπτυξης
- Coat of arms of the Hellenic Republic

Ministry overview
- Formed: February 1996
- Preceding agencies: Minister for Industry, Energy and Technology; Ministry of Trade; Ministry of Tourism
- Jurisdiction: Greek government
- Headquarters: Athens
- Employees: 2.416 (2024)
- Annual budget: 818.045.000 € (2025)
- Minister responsible: Takis Theodorikakos
- Deputy minister responsible: Stavros Kalafatis; Lazaros Tsavdaridis
- Child agencies: Secretariat of the Ministry of Development; General Secretariat for Trade; General Secretariat for Industry; General Secretariat for Private Investment; General Secretariat for Research and Innovation
- Website: www.mindev.gov.gr

The Ministry of Development (Greek: Υπουργείο Ανάπτυξης), formerly known as the Ministry of Development and Investment, is a government department of Greece. Current minister is Takis Theodorikakos.

== History ==
The Ministry of Development was established on 1 February 1996 by Prime Minister Costas Simitis through the merger of three former ministries: the Ministry of Industry, Energy and Technology, the Ministry of Trade and the Ministry of Tourism. On 7 October 2009, it was abolished and replaced by the Ministry of the Economy, Competitiveness and Shipping (Υπουργείο Οικονομίας, Ανταγωνιστικότητας και Ναυτιλίας). The new ministry was established following the division of the Ministry of the Economy and Finance, when the national economy portfolio was merged with the Ministry of Development and the Mercantile Marine Ministry.

On 7 September 2010, it was renamed the Ministry of Regional Development and Competitiveness (Υπουργείο Περιφερειακής Ανάπτυξης και Ανταγωνιστικότητας) to reflect the impending re-establishment of a separate Ministry of Maritime Affairs, Islands and Fisheries. However, no Presidential Decree was issued to formalize the renaming, and the ministry retained its earlier official name despite the loss of the shipping portfolio on 30 September. After the reincorporation of the latter on 27 June 2011, it was renamed the Ministry of Development, Competitiveness and Shipping (Υπουργείο Ανάπτυξης, Ανταγωνιστικότητας και Ναυτιλίας). On 21 June 2012, it was split again from the Ministry of Shipping and merged instead with the Ministry of Infrastructure, Transport and Networks to become the Ministry of Development, Competitiveness, Infrastructure, Transport and Networks. The merger was reversed following a cabinet reshuffle on 25 June 2013, but on 27 January 2015 all three ministries were amalgamated into the Ministry of the Economy, Infrastructure, Shipping and Tourism in the first Tsipras cabinet. Οn 23 September 2015, it was renamed the Ministry of the Economy, Development and Tourism upon the restoration of the infrastructure and shipping ministries. On 5 November 2016, it was renamed the Ministry of the Economy and Development upon the restoration of the Ministry of Tourism. On 9 July 2019, it was renamed the Ministry of Development and Investment by the incoming New Democracy government. Upon the formation of the second Mitsotakis cabinet on 27 June 2023, it reverted to its original name.

== List of ministers ==
=== Development (1996–2009) ===
Name	Took office	Left office	Party
Vasso Papandreou	1 February 1996	19 February 1999	PASOK
Evangelos Venizelos	19 February 1999	13 April 2000	PASOK
Nikos Christodoulakis	13 April 2000	24 October 2001	PASOK
Akis Tsochatzopoulos	24 October 2001	10 March 2004	PASOK
Dimitris Sioufas	10 March 2004	19 September 2007	New Democracy
Christos Folias	19 September 2007	8 January 2009	New Democracy
Kostis Hatzidakis	8 January 2009	7 October 2009	New Democracy

=== Economy, competitiveness and shipping (2009–2010) ===
Name	Took office	Left office	Party
Louka Katseli	7 October 2009	7 September 2010	PASOK
Michalis Chrisochoidis	7 September 2010	30 September 2010	PASOK

=== Regional development and competitiveness (2010–2011) ===
Name	Took office	Left office	Party
Michalis Chrisochoidis	30 September 2010	27 June 2011	PASOK

=== Development, competitiveness and shipping (2011–2012) ===
Name	Took office	Left office	Party	Notes
Michalis Chrisochoidis	27 June 2011	7 March 2012	PASOK	Coalition Cabinet of Lucas Papademos from 11 November 2011
Anna Diamantopoulou	7 March 2012	17 May 2012	PASOK	Coalition Cabinet of Lucas Papademos from 11 November 2011
Yannis Stournaras	17 May 2012	21 June 2012	Independent	Caretaker Cabinet of Panagiotis Pikrammenos

=== Development, competitiveness, infrastructure, transport and networks (2012–2013) ===
Name	Took office	Left office	Party	Notes
Kostis Hatzidakis	21 June 2012	25 June 2013	New Democracy	Coalition Cabinet of Antonis Samaras

=== Development and competitiveness (2013–2015) ===
Name	Took office	Left office	Party	Notes
Kostis Hatzidakis	25 June 2013	10 June 2014	New Democracy	Coalition Cabinet of Antonis Samaras
Nikos Dendias	10 June 2014	3 November 2014	New Democracy	Coalition Cabinet of Antonis Samaras
Kostas Skrekas	3 November 2014	27 January 2015	New Democracy	Coalition Cabinet of Antonis Samaras

=== Economy, infrastructure, shipping and tourism (2015) ===
Name	Took office	Left office	Party	Notes
Giorgos Stathakis	27 January 2015	27 August 2015	Syriza	First Coalition Cabinet of Alexis Tsipras
Nikos Christodoulakis	28 August 2015	21 September 2015	PASOK	Caretaker Cabinet of Vassiliki Thanou-Christophilou

=== Economy, development and tourism (2015–2016) ===
Name	Took office	Left office	Party	Notes
Giorgos Stathakis	23 September 2015	5 November 2016	Syriza	Second Coalition Cabinet of Alexis Tsipras

=== Economy and development (2016–2019) ===
Name	Took office	Left office	Party	Notes
Dimitri B. Papadimitriou	5 Νοvember 2016	27 February 2018	Syriza	Second Coalition Cabinet of Alexis Tsipras
Yannis Dragasakis	28 February 2018	9 July 2019	Syriza	Second Coalition Cabinet of Alexis Tsipras

=== Development and investment (2019–2023) ===
Name	Took office	Left office	Party	Notes
Adonis Georgiadis	9 July 2019	26 May 2023	New Democracy	
Helen Louri-Dendrinou	26 May 2023	27 June 2023	Independent	Caretaker Cabinet of Ioannis Sarmas

=== Development (2023–present) ===
Name	Took office	Left office	Party
Kostas Skrekas	27 June 2023	14 June 2024	New Democracy
Takis Theodorikakos	14 June 2024	Incumbent	New Democracy
