= Ministry of Development, Competitiveness, Infrastructure, Transport and Networks (Greece) =

Greek Government Ministry

The Ministry of Development, Competitiveness, Infrastructure, Transport and Communications (Greek: Υπουργείο Ανάπτυξης, Ανταγωνιστικότητας, Υποδομών, Μεταφορών και Δικτύων) was a Greek Government Ministry. It was established on June 21, 2012, following a proposal by Prime Minister Antonis Samaras.

It ranked sixth in among the cabinet ministries, according to Prime Ministerial decision Y4/21.6.2012.

The first Minister was Kostis Hatzidakis, with Stavros Kalogiannis as Alternate Minister.

== Formation ==
The ministry was set up from departments of the former ministries of Infrastructure, Transport and Communications and Development, Competitiveness and Shipping—except those transferred to the Ministry of Shipping and Aegean—and the General Secretariat for Research and Technology, which was transferred from the former Ministry of Education, Lifelong Learning and Religious Affairs.

== See also ==
- Cabinet of Antonis Samaras
- Ministry of Infrastructure, Transport and Networks (Greece)
