= Gerasimos Arsenis =

Greek politician (1931–2016)

Gerasimos Arsenis MP
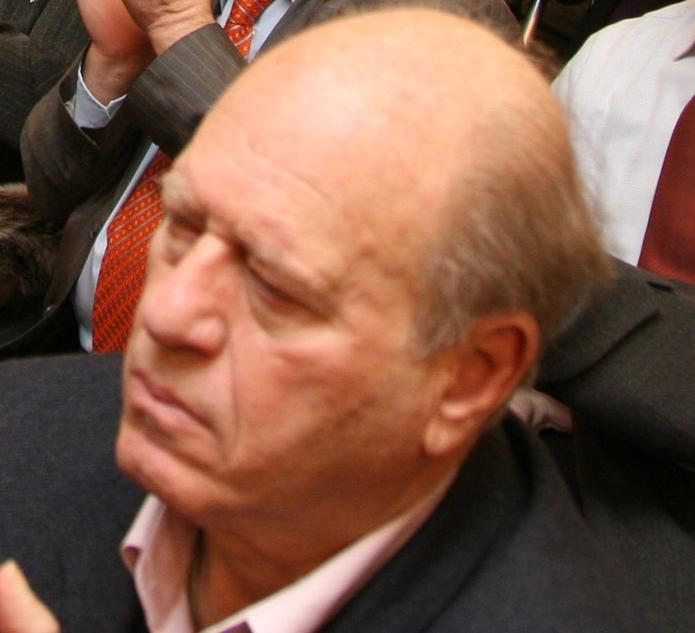

Governor of the Bank of Greece
- In office November 3, 1981 – February 20, 1984

Minister for National Defense of Greece
- In office 13 October 1993 – 24 September 1996
- Preceded by: Ioannis Varvitsiotis
- Succeeded by: Akis Tsochatzopoulos

Minister for National Education and Religious Affairs of Greece
- In office 25 September 1996 – 13 April 2000
- Preceded by: George Papandreou
- Succeeded by: Petros Efthymiou

Personal details
- Born: 30 May 1931 Kephalonia, Greece
- Died: 19 April 2016 (aged 84)
- Party: Panhellenic Socialist Movement
- Spouse: Louka Katseli
- Education: National and Kapodistrian University of Athens, Massachusetts Institute of Technology
- Profession: Lawyer, Economist, Politician

Gerasimos Arsenis (Greek: Γεράσιμος Αρσένης; 30 May 1931 – 19 April 2016) was a Greek politician who served as a Member of the Hellenic Parliament in various terms, as well as several appointments to Government Ministries in successive Governments with the Panhellenic Socialist Movement (PASOK).

== Life ==
Gerasimos Arsenis was born on the Greek island of Kephalonia. He went on to study law at the National and Kapodistrian University of Athens and after obtaining his degree, he continued his post-graduate studies in economics at the Massachusetts Institute of Technology (MIT). He spoke three languages, namely Greek, English and French.

It was his MIT thesis, entitled "The Two - Gap Analysis: A Proposal for North - South Cooperation" that got him recruited to the UN, and it formed the basis of the negotiations for the United Nations Conference on Trade and Development (UNCTAD).

From 1960 until 1964, Arsenis worked at the UN as an economist, implementing and establishing UNCTAD itself. In 1964 he was appointed to the position of Director of the Research Division of the OECD Development Centre in Paris, which post he held until 1966.

In 1967, Arsenis was appointed to the position of Senior Economist of the UNCTAD and, in 1974, he was promoted to the seat of Director of UNCTAD where he served until 1980. During this period as director, Arsenis engaged in research and participated in negotiations concerning reform of the International Monetary System (IMF). From 1974 until 1980, Arsenis also served as an independent expert with UNCTAD, providing consultancy to the Ministerial Committee of Twenty on the Reform of the International Monetary System..

While serving as Director of UNCTAD, Arsenis contributed to the development of numerous proposals – including the creation of special drawing rights (SDR), developmental assistance and coordination of program assistance for the World Bank and the generation of balance-of-payments financing that the IMF subsequently used for effective stabilization and development support schemes.

Gerasimos Arsenis also served as President of the Athens Development and Governance Institute (ADGI-INERPOST), and vice-president of the Marangopoulos Foundation for Human Rights.

Gerasimos Arsenis was married to Louka Katseli and was father to four children. He died on 19 April 2016, and his funeral was held in Athens at the Church of Agios Dionysios on 21 April 2016.

== Political career ==
Arsenis was a prominent member of the Panhellenic Socialist Movement (PASOK), and his first governmental appointment was as Governor of the Bank of Greece in November 1981, a post he held until February 1984. During this period, Arsenis oversaw the liberalization of the Greek financial system and modernization of its financial regulatory system. Arsenis acted as a policy advisor to numerous governments regarding foreign exchange, external financing and debt rescheduling. During his time in office in this administrative period, Arsenis was known as the ‘economy tsar’. As Minister of National Economy he advocated for decentralisation which he believed to be necessary in a participatory democracy, and he also introduced VAT to the economy.

In 1982 Gerasimos Arsenis was appointed Minister of National Economy, a position that he held until 26 July 1985. In March 1984, the Papandrou government decided to merge the Ministry of Finance with the Ministry of National Economy under Arsenis. He was appointed to serve additionally as Minister of Mercantile Marine on 5 June 1985.

The background to appointment was the collapse in the shipping industry that had been ongoing since the early 1980s due to an inflated fleet and the energy crisis. The Union of Greek Ship Owners (UGS) requested meetings with Prime Minister Papandreou throughout the shipping industry crisis, and looked to the government to step in and effectively manage the crisis. However, Papandreou refused all meeting requests with the UGS after January 1983 and so there had been no meaningful dialogue. There was brief hope that this would change when the Papandreou administration won the 1985 elections. However, Arsenis was appointed to the Ministry of Mercantile Marine along with his other portfolio, and it became apparent that the administration intended to dissolve the ministry. The backlash from the shipping industry was enormous, leading to a policy reversal, and in July 1985, a month later, Arsenis was removed from all ministerial positions.

Arsenis was expelled from PASOK in early 1986, due to disagreements between him and the policy and practice of Andreas Papandreou's administration. The following year, he published a book entitled Political Testimony in which he detailed his experiences in office, and accused the Prime Minister of being personally responsible for the failure of reforms.

In April 1987, he announced the formation of the Democratic Initiative party, which he intended to attract other dissilluisioned PASOK members, as well as independents on the left. The party was ultimately called the Greek Socialist Party for Democracy and Development (ESK). Arsenis did lead the party into the 18 June 1989 elections, receiving 0.21% of the votes, but he dissolved the party in 1989.

Arsenis returned to the Panhellenic Socialist Movement in 1989, which won the national elections of 1993, and was appointed Minister of Defence until 1996. He was the Minister of Defence during the Imia crisis, which brought Greece and Turkey close to war in December 1995. During his post as the Minister, he promoted the Joint Defence Dogma with Cyprus, restructured defence procurement, and pursued policies of co-operation in defence with a number of countries in the region.

Andreas Papandreou finally resigned as Prime Minister of Greece in January 1996, owing to longstanding health problems which had kept him on life support since the previous year, and after a two-month-long hospitalization which had incapacitated him and created a serious power-vacuum in Greece. Although Arsenis announced his candidacy to replace Papandreou, and was a favourite, with Costas Simitis, to win, he actually came in third after, Akis Tsohatzopoulos. Only party executives participated in this selection vote, not the wider party membership.

Gerasimos Arsenis and Akis Tsohatzopoulos were more committed to the socialist cause of PASOK, and arguably were more populist oriented, compared with the more moderate, austerity oriented Simitris, who appointed reformists in finance and economics.

In 1996, as part of the Costas Simitis administration, Arsenis was appointed Minister of National Education and Religious Affairs, a position that he held until 2000. Gerasimos Arsenis faced significant opposition for the educational system changes he proposed, including widespread demonstrations and strikes. Striking teachers were mostly from the left, and many were members of PASOK, and it was this, according to Maria Giannakou, that led Prime Minister Simitis to appoint a replacement minister for Arsenis in 2000.

Arsenis was a member of the Hellenic Parliament from 1986 to 1989 (one term), from 1990 to 2004 (four consecutive terms) and from 2006 to 2007 (one term).

Political offices
Preceded by Xenophon Zolotas	Governor of Bank of Greece; 3 November 1981 - 20 February 1984	Succeeded by Dimitrios Chalikias
Preceded by Prior administration	Minister of National Economy of Greece; March 1982 – 26 July 1985	Succeeded by Costas Simitis
Preceded by Ioannis Pottakis	Minister of Finance of Greece; 27 March 1984 – 26 July 1985	Succeeded by Dimitris Tsovolas
Preceded by Georgios Katsifaras	Minister of Mercantile Marine of Greece; 5 June 1985 – 26 July 1985	Succeeded by Efstathios Alexandris
Preceded by Ioannis Varvitsiotis	Minister for National Defence of Greece; 13 October 1993 – 24 September 1996	Succeeded by Akis Tsochatzopoulos
Preceded by George Papandreou	Minister for National Education and Religious Affairs of Greece; 25 September 1996 – 13 April 2000	Succeeded by Petros Efthymiou
