= Diamantidis =

Diamantidis (Greek: Διαμαντίδης) is a Greek surname. Notable people with the surname include:

- Antonis Diamantidis (1892–1945), Greek musician
- Giannis Diamantidis (born 1948), Greek politician
- Dimitris Diamantidis (born 1980), Greek basketball player
- Georgios Diamantidis (born 1984), Greek swimmer
