= Antonis Kotsakas =

Greek politician

Antonis Kotsakas (Greek: Αντώνης Κοτσακάς; born in 1947) is a Greek politician, former member of the Greek Parliament for the Panhellenic Socialist Movement (PASOK) for Chios and former minister. Now he is a member of Syriza.

He was born in Thymiana in Chios but grew up in Moschato. He worked as foreman in construction. He was a founding member of the Panhellenic Socialist Movement in 1974. In 1984 he became a member of the Central Committee of PASOK, a post in which he was reelected until 2009.

He was elected as MP of Chios in the election of June 1989 and held this seat until 2000. In 1993-4 he was deputy minister of Labour and from 1994 to 1996 was Minister for the Aegean.

In June 2011, he resigned as member of the National Council of PASOK over disagreements with the policies followed by the government of George Papandreou over the handling of the economic crisis of Greece and the agreements made with its creditors. He claimed that he didn't leave from PASOK, but that PASOK betrayed its ideas. He became a member of Syriza and along with other former politicians of PASOK, founded the Socialist Tendency in the party. In October 2015, he was elected to the Political Secretariat of Syriza. As a member of Syriza, he is considered to have helped with the organizing of other disappointed ex members of PASOK in Syriza.

Preceded by Nikolaos Aggelopoulos	Deputy Minister of Labour; 1993–1994	Succeeded by Giorgos Adamopoulos
Preceded by Kostas Skandalidis	Minister for the Aegean and Island Policy; 1994–1996	Succeeded by Elisavet Papazoi
