= Ioannis Skoularikis =

Greek politician (1928-2008)

Ioannis Skoularikis (Greek: Ιωάννης Σκουλαρίκης; 1 August 1928, Smila – 15 September 2008) or Yannis Skoularikis (Γιάννης Σκουλαρίκης) was a Greek politician of the Panhellenic Socialist Movement (PASOK) and cabinet member under Andreas Papandreou.

He was a lawyer, specializing in criminal law and labor law.

He was Minister of Public Order from 21 October 1981 to 9 May 1985, Alternate Minister of the Interior from 22 June 1988 to 17 March 1989, when he was appointed Minister of Justice, holding the post until 2 June. He then served again as Minister of Labor from 8 July 1994 to 15 September 1995.

As Minister of Public Order he was responsible for the creation of a new police force, the present-day Hellenic Police, which was created in 1984 by merging the old Gendarmerie and City Police, in order to create a more modern and democratic law enforcement agency. He also supported the creation of labor unions inside the Police, despite strong opposition from conservatives.

He died in September 2008.

Political offices
Preceded by Ioannis Katsadimas	Minister of Public Order; 21 October 1981 – 9 May 1985	Succeeded by Alexandros Floros
Preceded by Kosmas Sfyrios	Alternate Minister of the Interior; 22 June 1988 – 17 March 1989	Vacant Title next held by Christos Markogiannakis
Preceded by Vasileios Rotis	Minister of Justice; 17 March – 2 June 1989	Succeeded by Konstantinos Stamatis
Preceded by Evangelos Giannopoulos	Minister of Labor; 8 July 1994 – 15 September 1995	Succeeded by Stefanos Tzoumakas
