= Ministry for the Aegean =

The Ministry for the Aegean (Greek: Υπουργείο Αιγαίου) was a government department of Greece. It was founded in 1985 (Law 1558/1985), with Mytilene as its seat, and tasked with supervising the development of the long-neglected Aegean Islands.

In 2007 it was merged with the Ministry for Mercantile Marine to form the Ministry for Mercantile Marine, the Aegean and Island Policy. The new ministry retained a Deputy Minister with seat at Mytilene. In 2009 the ministry was split up, with the Mercantile Marine sector being absorbed by the Ministry for the Economy, Competitiveness and Shipping and the former Ministry for the Aegean department merged into the Ministry of Infrastructure, Transport and Networks as the General Secretariat for the Aegean and Island Policy. In September 2010, the General Secretariat was absorbed by the Ministry for Maritime Affairs, Islands and Fisheries.

== List of ministers ==
=== The Aegean (1985–2007) ===
#	Name	Took office	Left office	Party
1	Kosmas Spyriou	26 July 1985	5 February 1987	Panhellenic Socialist Movement
2	Petros Valvis	5 February 1987	16 November 1988	Panhellenic Socialist Movement
3	Evangelos Giannopoulos	16 November 1988	1 July 1989	Panhellenic Socialist Movement
4	Emmanuel Kefalogiannis	2 July 1989	7 October 1989	New Democracy
5	Antonis Foussas	12 October 1989	11 April 1990	New Democracy
6	Giorgios Misailides	11 April 1990	8 August 1992	New Democracy
7	Konstantinos Mitsotakis	8 August 1991	13 October 1993	New Democracy
8	Kostas Skandalidis	13 October 1993	7 July 1994	Panhellenic Socialist Movement
9	Antonis Kotsakas	7 July 1994	24 September 1996	Panhellenic Socialist Movement
10	Elisavet Papazoi	24 September 1996	19 February 1999	Panhellenic Socialist Movement
11	Stavros Benos	19 February 1999	13 April 2000	Panhellenic Socialist Movement
12	Nikolaos Sifounakis	13 April 2000	10 March 2004	Panhellenic Socialist Movement
13	Aristotelis Pavlidis	10 March 2004	19 September 2007	New Democracy

=== Mercantile marine, the Aegean and island policy (2007–2009) ===
Name	Took office	Left office	Party	Notes
Georgios Voulgarakis	19 September 2007	12 September 2008	New Democracy	Resigned
Anastasios Papaligouras	12 September 2008	7 October 2009	New Democracy	

== See also ==
- Cabinet of Greece
