= Caretaker Cabinet of Panayiotis Pikrammenos =

Caretaker Cabinet of Panagiotis Pikrammenos
- Cabinet of Greece

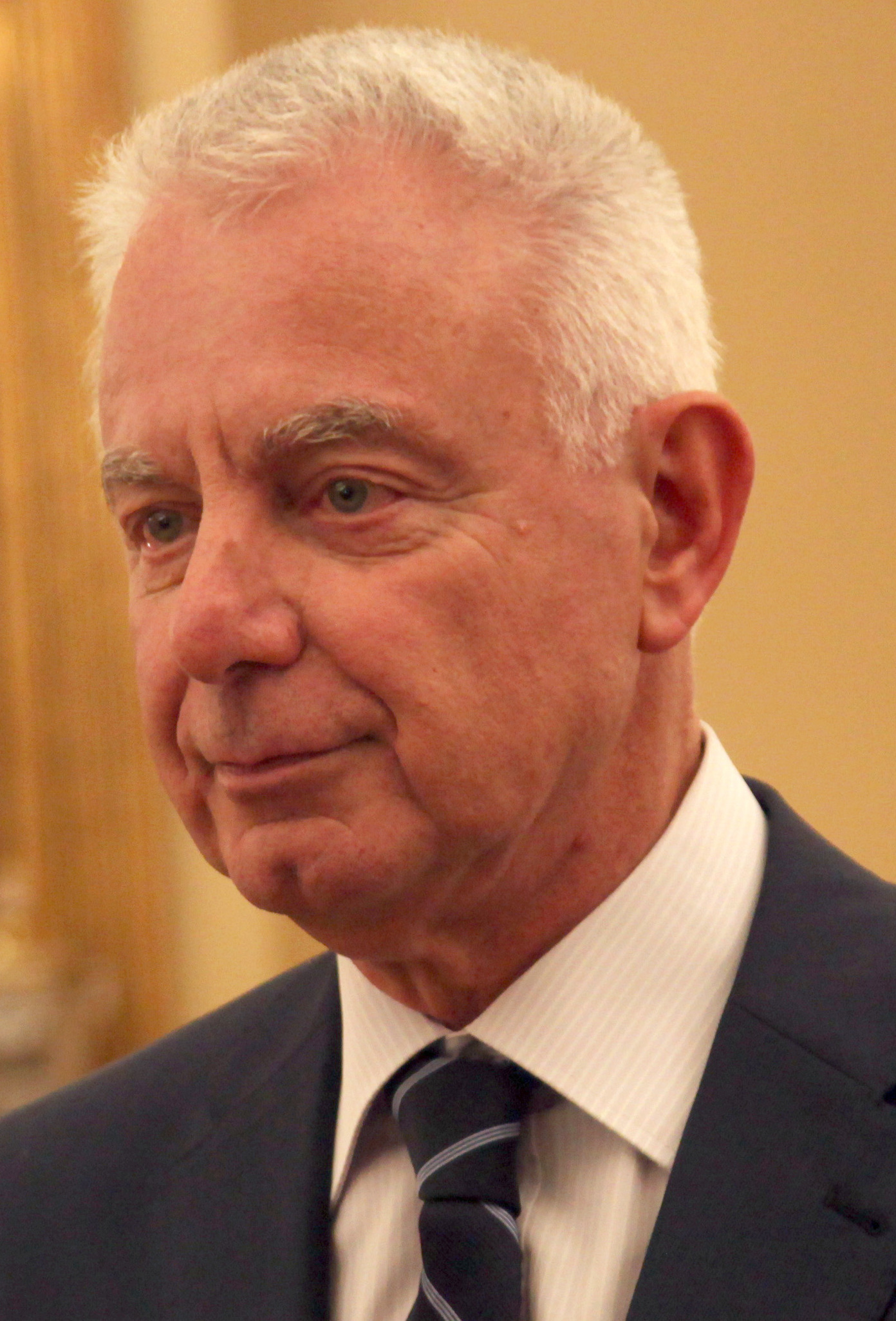
- Panagiotis Pikrammenos during the oath ceremony
- Date established: 17 May 2012
- Date dissolved: 21 June 2012

Leadership and composition
- Head of state: Karolos Papoulias
- Head of government: Panagiotis Pikrammenos
- No. of ministers: 17
- Member parties: Independents and others
- Status in legislature: Technocratic caretaker government
- Opposition parties: None (caretaker cabinets in Greece have no formal opposition)

Formation and history
- Legislature term: 14th (2012–2012)
- Predecessor: Papademos Cabinet
- Successor: Samaras Cabinet

The Caretaker Cabinet of Panagiotis Pikrammenos was sworn in on 17 May 2012 after the end of the period of office of the Cabinet of Lucas Papademos, when an inconclusive election on 6 May 2012 resulted in a hung parliament. According to the provisions of the Greek Constitution, President Karolos Papoulias appointed Panagiotis Pikrammenos, the outgoing chairman of the Council of State, as caretaker Prime Minister after none of the major parties was able to form a government. The subsequent elections were held on 17 June 2012, again resulting in a hung parliament, and this cabinet served until the formation of a coalition government on 21 June 2012.

== Ministers ==
Office	Incumbent	Party	Dates
Prime Minister	Panagiotis Pikrammenos	Independent	16 May 2012 – 20 June 2012
Minister for Administrative Reform and e-Governance	Pavlos Apostolidis	Independent	17 May 2012 – 21 June 2012
Minister for the Interior	Antonios Manitakis	Independent	17 May 2012 – 21 June 2012
Minister for Finance	Georgios Zanias	Independent	17 May 2012 – 23 June 2012
Minister for Foreign Affairs	Petros Molyviatis	New Democracy	17 May 2012 – 21 June 2012
Minister for National Defence	Frangoulis Frangos	Independent	17 May 2012 – 21 June 2012
Minister for Development, Competitiveness and Shipping	Yiannis Stournaras	Independent	17 May 2012 – 21 June 2012
Minister for the Environment, Energy and Climate Change	Grigoris Tsaltas	Independent	17 May 2012 – 21 June 2012
Minister for Education, Lifelong Learning and Religious Affairs	Angeliki-Efrosini Kiaou	Independent	17 May 2012 – 21 June 2012
Minister for Infrastructure, Transport and Networks	Simos Simopoulos	Independent	17 May 2012 – 21 June 2012
Minister for Labour and Social Security	Antonis Roupakiotis	Independent	17 May 2012 – 21 June 2012
Minister for Health and Social Solidarity	Christos Kittas	Independent	17 May 2012 – 21 June 2012
Minister for Rural Development and Food	Napoleon Maravegias	Independent	17 May 2012 – 21 June 2012
Minister for Justice, Transparency and Human Rights	Christos Geraris	Independent	17 May 2012 – 21 June 2012
Minister for Citizen Protection	Eleftherios Oikonomou	Independent	17 May 2012 – 21 June 2012
Minister for Culture and Tourism	Tatiana Karapanagioti	Panhellenic Socialist Movement	17 May 2012 – 21 June 2012
Minister of State	Antonis Argyros	New Democracy	17 May 2012 – 21 June 2012
