= Markogiannakis =

Markogiannakis is a Greek surname. Notable people with the surname include:

- Alexandros Markogiannakis (fl. 2023), Greek politician
- Christos Markogiannakis (born 1980), Greek novelist and criminartist
