= Sotiria Vasilakopoulou =

Greek trade unionist

Sotiria Vasilakopoulou (Greek: Σωτηρία Βασιλακοπούλου; 2 June 1959 – 28 July 1980) was a student of Panteion University and member of the Communist Youth of Greece who was killed in the gate of ETMA factory on July 28, 1980.

== Biography ==
She was born in Athens on June 2, 1959. She was a good student academically and after completing her elementary studies she was admitted to Panteion University. She became a member of the Communist Youth (KNE) in January 1978.

On the day of her death KNE members were disseminating announcements which informed the factory workers about the upcoming protests. Greece at the time was suffering from financial problems and the then opposition party PASOK (left-wing, socialist) was growing in popularity, while many strikes were going to take place during the same period. In order to prevent the informing of the workers about the upcoming protests, the Athens-based ETMA factory's directors onboarded the workers which were leaving the premises in buses, in order to avoid their contact with KNE members. After the workers boarded, the buses began accelerating while heading to the factory's gate, where KNE members tried to disseminate the announcements for the upcoming protest while avoiding the buses leaving. Vasilakopoulou was killed by one of those buses which were heading to the gate. Marios Haritos, the driver who killed her, was sentenced in 12 months' imprisonment in 1983, and his attorney was Alexandros Lykourezos, well-known in the country.

The ETMA workers' union organised immediately a strike, which was suppressed by the Units for the Reinstatement of Order. Her funeral two days after her death became, in the end, a protest against employers' bad practices and her murder caused political controversy. The Odigitis festival later this year (an annual festival of the Communist Youth in September) was dedicated to her and Yiannis Ritsos dedicated to her a poem. Every year, in the anniversary of her murder, members of KNE and KKE organise an event in her memory in the gates of the former ETMA factory which shut down in 2013.
