= Cabinet of Antonis Samaras =

Coalition in Greece, 2012

- Cabinet of Greece

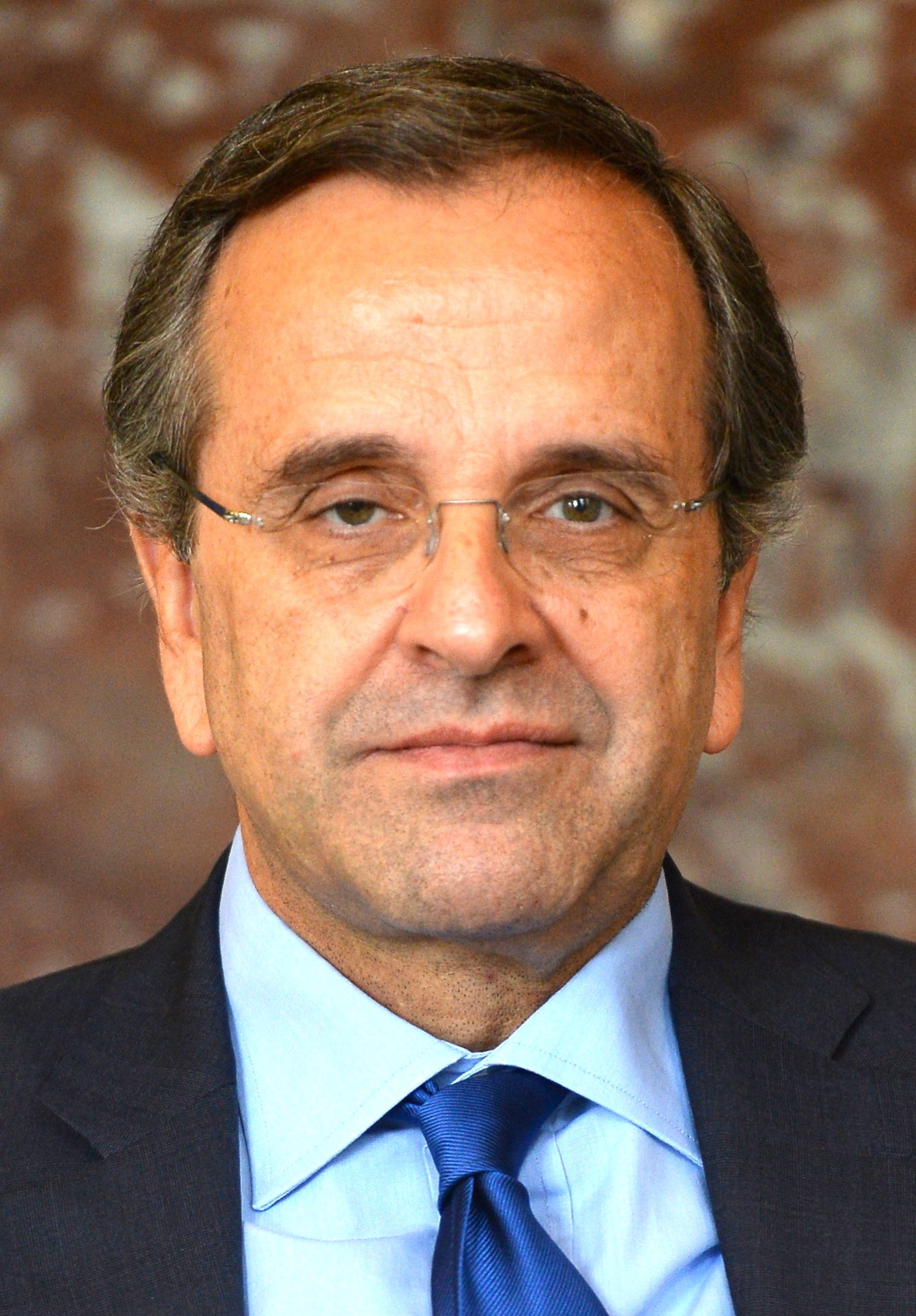
- Antonis Samaras in 2014
- Date formed: 21 June 2012
- Date dissolved: 26 January 2015

People and organisations
- Head of state: Karolos Papoulias
- Head of government: Antonis Samaras
- Deputy head of government: Evangelos Venizelos (since 25 June 2013)
- Member parties: New Democracy, PASOK, Democratic Left (DIMAR, until 21 June 2013)
- Status in legislature: Majority coalition government
- Opposition parties: Coalition of the Radical Left (SYRIZA); Independent Greeks (ANEL); Golden Dawn; Democratic Left (DIMAR) (from 21 June 2013); Communist Party of Greece (KKE)
- Opposition leader: Alexis Tsipras

History
- Election: June 2012 Greek legislative election
- Legislature term: 15th (2012–2015)
- Predecessor: Pikrammenos Caretaker Cabinet
- Successor: Tsipras Cabinet

The Cabinet of Antonis Samaras succeeded the Caretaker Cabinet of Panayiotis Pikrammenos after the repeated legislative elections in May and June 2012.

== The cabinet ==
The cabinet was sworn in on Thursday, 21 June 2012. The former ministries of Shipping, Tourism and Macedonia and Thrace were re-established. The junior coalition partners, PASOK and DIMAR, chose to take a limited role in the cabinet, preferring to be represented by party officials and independent technocrats instead of MPs. Vassilis Rapanos, the prime minister's first choice for finance minister, fell ill before being sworn in, and tendered his resignation on 25 June. Yannis Stournaras was then chosen as the new finance minister on 26 June, and sworn in on 5 July.

DIMAR left the coalition on 21 June 2013 in protest at the closure of the nation's public broadcaster ERT, leaving Antonis Samaras with a slim majority of 153 ND and PASOK MPs combined. The two remaining parties proceeded to negotiate a cabinet reshuffle that resulted in a significantly expanded role for PASOK in the new coalition government. A further reshuffle followed the 2014 European Parliament election.

Office	Officeholder	Party	Dates
Prime Minister	Antonis Samaras	New Democracy	20 June 2012 – 26 January 2015
Deputy Prime Minister	Vacant until 25 June 2013		
Deputy Prime Minister	Evangelos Venizelos	Panhellenic Socialist Movement (PASOK)	25 June 2013 – 27 January 2015
Minister for Foreign Affairs	Dimitris Avramopoulos	New Democracy	21 June 2012 – 25 June 2013
Minister for Foreign Affairs	Evangelos Venizelos	PASOK	25 June 2013 – 27 January 2015
Minister for Finance	Yannis Stournaras	Independent	5 July 2012 – 10 June 2014
Minister for Finance	Gikas Hardouvelis	Independent	10 June 2014 – 27 January 2015
Minister for National Defence	Panos Panagiotopoulos	New Democracy	21 June 2012 – 25 June 2013
Minister for National Defence	Dimitris Avramopoulos	New Democracy	25 June 2013 – 1 November 2014
Minister for National Defence	Nikos Dendias	New Democracy	1 November 2014 – 27 January 2015
Minister for the Interior	Evripidis Stylianidis	New Democracy	21 June 2012 – 25 June 2013
Minister for the Interior	Giannis Michelakis	New Democracy	25 June 2013 – 10 June 2014
Minister for the Interior	Argyris Dinopoulos	New Democracy	10 June 2014 – 27 January 2015
Minister for Development, Competitiveness, Infrastructure, Transport and Networks	Kostis Chatzidakis	New Democracy	21 June 2012 – 25 June 2013
Minister for Development, Competitiveness, Infrastructure, Transport and Networks	Post abolished 25 June 2013		
Minister for Development and Competitiveness	Kostis Chatzidakis	New Democracy	25 June 2013 – 10 June 2014
Minister for Development and Competitiveness	Nikos Dendias	New Democracy	10 June 2014 – 3 November 2014
Minister for Development and Competitiveness	Konstantinos Skrekas	New Democracy	3 November 2014 – 27 January 2015
Minister for Infrastructure, Transport and Networks	Michalis Chrisochoidis	PASOK	25 June 2013 – 27 January 2015
Minister for Education, Religious Affairs, Culture and Sport	Konstantinos Arvanitopoulos	New Democracy	21 June 2012 – 25 June 2013
Minister for Education, Religious Affairs, Culture and Sport	Post abolished 25 June 2013		
Minister for Education and Religious Affairs	Konstantinos Arvanitopoulos	New Democracy	25 June 2013 – 10 June 2014
Minister for Education and Religious Affairs	Andreas Loverdos	PASOK	10 June 2014 – 27 January 2015
Minister for Culture and Sport	Panos Panagiotopoulos	New Democracy	25 June 2013 – 10 June 2014
Minister for Culture and Sport	Konstantinos Tasoulas	New Democracy	10 June 2014 – 27 January 2015
Minister for Administrative Reform and e-Governance	Antonis Manitakis	Independent	21 June 2012 – 25 June 2013
Minister for Administrative Reform and e-Governance	Kyriakos Mitsotakis	New Democracy	25 June 2013 – 27 January 2015
Minister for Health	Andreas Lykourentzos	New Democracy	21 June 2012 – 25 June 2013
Minister for Health	Adonis Georgiades	New Democracy	25 June 2013 – 10 June 2014
Minister for Health	Makis Voridis	New Democracy	10 June 2014 – 27 January 2015
Minister for Labour, Social Security and Welfare	Giannis Vroutsis	New Democracy	21 June 2012 – 27 January 2015
Minister for Rural Development and Food	Athanasios Tsaftaris	PASOK	21 June 2012 – 10 June 2014
Minister for Rural Development and Food	Giorgos Karasmanis	New Democracy	10 June 2014 – 27 January 2015
Minister for the Environment, Energy and Climate Change	Evangelos Livieratos	Independent	21 June 2012 – 25 June 2013
Minister for the Environment, Energy and Climate Change	Giannis Maniatis	PASOK	25 June 2013 – 27 January 2015
Minister for Justice, Transparency and Human Rights	Antonios Roupakiotis	Independent	21 June 2012 – 25 June 2013
Minister for Justice, Transparency and Human Rights	Charalampos Athanasiou	New Democracy	25 June 2013 – 28 January 2015
Minister for Public Order and Citizen Protection	Nikos Dendias	New Democracy	21 June 2012 – 10 June 2014
Minister for Public Order and Citizen Protection	Vassilis Kikilias	New Democracy	10 June 2014 – 27 January 2015
Minister for Tourism	Olga Kefalogianni	New Democracy	21 June 2012 – 27 January 2015
Minister for Shipping and the Aegean	Konstantinos Mousouroulis	New Democracy	21 June 2012 – 25 June 2013
Minister for Shipping and the Aegean	Miltiadis Varvitsiotis	New Democracy	25 June 2013 – 27 January 2015
Minister for Macedonia and Thrace	Theodoros Karaoglou	New Democracy	21 June 2012 – 10 June 2014
Minister for Macedonia and Thrace	Georgios Orfanos	New Democracy	10 June 2014 – 27 January 2015
Minister of State	Dimitrios I. Stamatis	New Democracy	21 June 2012 – 27 January 2015
Deputy Minister to the Prime Minister and government spokesperson	Simos Kedikoglou	New Democracy	21 June 2012 – 10 June 2014
Deputy Minister to the Prime Minister and government spokesperson	Sofia Voultepsi	New Democracy	10 June 2014 – 27 January 2015
