= Nikos Gelestathis =

Greek lawyer and politician (1930–2020)

Nikos Gelestathis Νίκος Γκελεστάθης
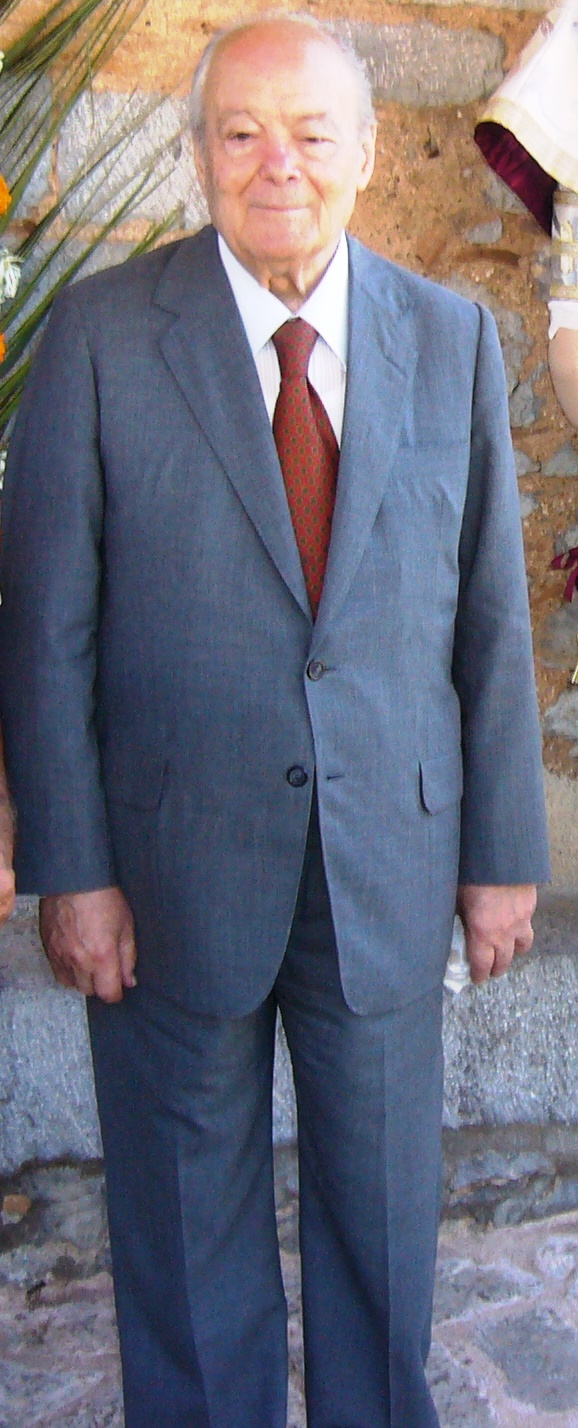
- Nikos Gelestathis 2011

Minister of Public Order
- In office 3 December 1992 – 14 September 1993
- Prime Minister: Konstantinos Mitsotakis
- Preceded by: Theodoros Anagnostopoulos
- Succeeded by: Dimitrios Manikas (acting)

Minister of Transport and Communications
- In office 11 April 1990 – 3 December 1992
- Prime Minister: Konstantinos Mitsotakis
- Preceded by: George Noutsopoulos
- Succeeded by: Theodoros Anagnostopoulos

Member of the Hellenic Parliament for Phocis
- In office 1981–2004

Personal details
- Born: 1930 Desfina, Phocis, Greece
- Died: 30 August 2020 (age 90) Athens, Greece
- Party: New Democracy
- Education: National and Kapodistrian University of Athens
- Profession: Lawyer; Politician

Nikos Gelestathis (1930 – 30 August 2020) was a Greek lawyer and politician. Gelestathis served as the Minister of Public Order from 1992 to 1993 and the Minister of Transport and Communications from 1990 to 1992. He was a member of the Hellenic Parliament for New Democracy for 23 years, from 1981 until 2004. He was first elected in parliament in 1981 and won re-election in 1985, the June and November 1989 elections, 1990, 1993, 1996 and 2000.

Gelestathis was born in Desfina and studied law at the National and Kapodistrian University of Athens.

Gelestathis died in Athens on 30 August 2020, at the age of 90.
