= Adamopoulos =

Adamopoulos or Adamopoulou is a Greek surname. Notable people with the surname include:

- Ariadni Adamopoulou (born 2000), Greek athlete
- Giorgos Adamopoulos (1946–2023), Greek politician
- Nicholas Adamopoulos (born 1984), birth name of Nick Adams, Australian-born American political commentator and author
- Tasso Adamopoulos (1944–2021), French violist
