= VIO.ME. =

Factory in Thessaloniki, Greece

VIO.ME. (Greek: Βιομηχανική Μεταλλευτική, romanized: Viomichaniki Metaleftiki, meaning Industrial Metallurgy) is an occupied self-managed factory in Thessaloniki, Greece. It is the first initiative in Greece where the production of a factory is controlled by the workers.

== History ==
The factory was founded in 1982 and was a subsidiary of Philkeram Johnson, owned by the Philippou family. Initially, it manufactured materials for the construction sector. It was considered one of the most important companies in northern Greece until 2010, when its balance sheet was negative and payments to the workers were delayed. It has been reported that the parent company charged its subsidiary with a loan of 1.9 million euros, resulting in a fictitious liability. In August 2011, the company proceeded with a payment suspension, with the workers unpaid since May of the same year. In October, by decision of the general assembly, the workers went on a strike. In May 2012 the general assembly of workers, on the basis of which all decisions are now made, with an overwhelming majority of 97% decided to take control and responsibility of the factory. On February 12, 2013, the workers started the operation of the factory producing general cleaning products as well as some of the ones they were making before. The factory produces mostly ecological cleaning products, such as clothes cleaners, dish cleaners, soaps, etc., which are promoted in small stores, while they have also created an online store. From 2016, they have started producing construction glue. They have also opened up to the society with the establishment of the "solidarity supporter" subscription of 3 euros.

On March 30, 2020, the Public Power Corporation with the help of the riot police interrupted the power supply to the factory. The workers continued the operation of the factory with the use of a generator, at the same time requesting through the creation of a signature platform the immediate restoration of power supply with a consumption counter that would have the cooperative's tax number and the legalization of the factory space for its operation.

The factory does not formally belong to VIO.ME., as there is no legal framework for such cases in Greece. As a result, throughout the years of its operation, many attempts to auction the factory have been made.

=== Recognition ===
VIO.ME. has been supported by different organizations and personalities including Alexis Tsipras as leader of the opposition who visited the factory, Manu Chao who attended a workers' protest in front of the Ministry of Labour, Naomi Klein and others.

In 2016, a documentary by Apostolos Karakasis was published named Επόμενος Σταθμός: Ουτοπία (Next station: Utopia) about the initiative of the factory's workers. The documentary was presented in Thessaloniki Documentary Festival and the International Documentary Film Festival Amsterdam.

Fair Trade Hellas, has characterized the initiative as an example of "good practice" for social economy and economy of solidarity.

== Workers' actions ==
A major concern of VIO.ME. workers is opening up to society through initiatives, such as hosting concerts, cultural events as well as bazaars without intermediaries, as well as storing essential items for immigrants in Idomeni. The workers in collaboration with the Social Solidarity Clinic of Thessaloniki operate a workers' solidarity clinic, with open access to everyone, such as workers, people without medical insurance, immigrants and unemployed. Since March 2020 and due to the COVID-19 pandemic, VIO.ME. workers have been producing soaps in order to send them to various immigrant structures, as well as to prisoners in need of them.

The employees of VIO.ME. have developed a network of cooperation with similar cooperative ventures active in Greece or in other countries. In the context of these collaborations, in October 2016 VIO.ME. hosted the second Euro-Mediterranean meeting of cooperative ventures and self-managed factories, while in September 2017 it participated in the global conference held in Argentina. In October 2018, it co-organized with 18 other self-managed cooperative ventures the first Cooperation Festival.
