= Social League =

Social League Κοινωνικός Σύνδεσμος
- Leader: Giorgos Floridis
- General Secretary: Aggeliki Kosmopoulou
- Founded: November 2011
- Ideology: Social liberalism Liberalism
- Political position: Centre

Social League (Greek: Κοινωνικός Σύνδεσμος) is a Greek political movement founded in 2011 by the former member of parliament for the Panhellenic Socialist Movement Giorgos Floridis and other personalities of the business, medical, scientific and economic fields. Politically, it is located between the centre and the Pro-European left. It is administered by a nine-members Coordinating Group.
