= Evangelos Yannopoulos =

Greek politician and lawyer (1918-2003)

Evangelos Yannopoulos or Giannopoulos (Greek: Ευάγγελος Γιαννόπουλος; May 1918 – 4 September 2003) was a Greek lawyer and socialist politician, who served as a senior Minister in the governments of Andreas Papandreou and Costas Simitis. He was notable for his participation in the Greek Resistance during World War II, his key role in arranging prosecutions for the leaders of the deposed Regime of the Colonels in 1974, and for having his own talk show on Greek television.

== Life ==
He was born in May 1918 in the village of Mygdalia (now part of the municipality of Gortynia), in Arcadia. He graduated in Law from Athens University and worked as a lawyer, eventually going on to become one of the most famous and well-paid lawyers in Greece. In 1940–1941 he fought with the Greek Army in the Greco-Italian War as a second lieutenant of Infantry, and was wounded in battle. Later, after the German invasion of Greece, Yannopoulos joined the left-wing National Liberation Front (EAM) and served as an officer in its military branch, ELAS.

In 1964 he met Andreas Papandreou, and was one of Papandreou's lawyers in the so-called "ASPIDA trial". After the dictatorial Regime of the Colonels took power in Greece in 1967, Yannopoulos was active in the resistance against the dictatorship, and was imprisoned. In 1974, after the fall of the Colonels, Yannopoulos played a key role in arranging criminal prosecutions against them, along with fellow lawyers Alexandros Lykourezos, Grigoris Kasimatis, and Foivos Koutsikas. In 1974 he was a founding member of PASOK.

After PASOK took power in 1981, Yannopoulos served as Minister of Transport and Communications (1981–82), Minister of Labor (1982–86), Minister for Mercantile Marine (1987–88) and Minister for the Aegean (1988–89). PASOK returned to power in 1993, and Yannopoulos served as Minister of Labor (1993–94 and 1996) and Minister of Justice (1996–2000).

He died of cardiac arrest at Athens Medical Center on 4 September 2003, at age 85.

== TV show and public image ==
For many years Yannopoulos had his own political talk show on Greek television, titled "I Alli Opsi" (The other view), which achieved very high ratings.

As a politician, Yannopoulos was a polarizing figure, very popular with left-wing Greeks, but unpopular with conservatives.
