= Aristotelis Pavlidis =

Greek politician (1943–2022)

Aristotelis Pavlidis (31 October 1943 – 25 October 2022) was a Greek politician. He was Minister for the Aegean and Island Policy from 2004 until 2007.

Born on Kos, Greece, Pavlidis studied physics and mathematics at the University of Athens and business administration in London. He was a member of the central committee of New Democracy.

Pavlidis served as a member of parliament from the Dodecanese Islands following each general election from 1977, with the exception of 1996–2000. He was Minister for Merchant Shipping from July 1989 to September 1989, Deputy Minister for Finance from April 1990 to June 1990, and Minister for Merchant Shipping again from June 1990 to December 1992. In the Cabinet of Prime Minister Costas Karamanlis, Pavlidis became Minister of the Aegean and Island Policy on 10 March 2004. He was not included in the Cabinet sworn in on 19 September 2007, following New Democracy's victory in the September 2007 parliamentary election.

Allegations of corruption by a shipowner over the allocation of subsidised ferry route were made in 2007 and denied by Pavlidis. After investigation, on 11 May 2009 a Greek parliament committee voted 146–144 in favour of indicting him on bribery charges, five votes short of the 151 required to remove his parliamentary immunity.
