= Christos Geraris =

Greek jurist and government minister (born 1938)

Christos Geraris (born 1938) is a Greek jurist and former Minister of Justice, Transparency, and Human Rights in the Pikrammenos Government.

== Biography ==
Geraris studied law at the University of Athens and pursued postgraduate studies in community law at the University of Paris. He entered the judiciary in 1963 as a deputy of the Council of State, became a rapporteur in 1973, a councillor in 1982, and vice-president in 1997. In 1999, he became the president of the Council of State, a position he held until 2005. From 1989 to 1992, he served as a judge at the Court of First Instance of the European Communities. After his retirement, he served as president of the Personal Data Protection Authority (2008), professor at the National School of Public Administration, president of the Supreme Special Court, and ad hoc judge at the European Court of Human Rights.

On May 17, 2012, he was appointed as Minister of Justice, Transparency, and Human Rights in the Pikrammenos Government.
