= Antonis Drossoyannis =

Greek Army general and politician

Minister of Public Order
- In office 25 April 1986 – 22 June 1988
- Constituency: Phthiotis

Alternate Minister of National Defence
- In office 10 January 1984 – 25 April 1986

Vice Minister of National Defence
- In office 21 October 1981 – 10 January 1984

Personal details
- Born: January 26, 1922 Dafni, Phthiotis
- Died: November 5, 2006 (aged 84)
- Party: PASOK
- Occupation: Military officer, politician

Antonis Drossoyannis (Greek: Αντώνης Δροσογιάννης, January 26, 1922 – November 5, 2006) was a Greek Army general and politician of the Panhellenic Socialist Movement (PASOK) and cabinet minister.

== Life ==
Born in 1922 in the village of Dafni, Phthiotis, he enrolled in the Hellenic Army Academy in 1939. Upon the start of the Greco-Italian War in October 1940 he was sent to the Albanian front. Following the German invasion of Greece and the occupation of the country, he fled to the Middle East where he joined the armed forces of the Greek government in exile, first in the ranks of the 2nd Greek Brigade and then in the Sacred Squadron special forces unit, with which he fought in the Western Desert and Tunisia Campaigns, as well as in operations against the German garrisons of the Aegean islands. During the Greek Civil War (1946–49) he was commander of the 62nd Mountain Raider Company, and in 1955–58 commanded the Raider Units Training Centre (KEMK). He served in various staff and command positions of the Greek army's special forces, culminating as commander of the Special Operations Command of the Hellenic National Defence General Staff.

Following the establishment of the Regime of the Colonels, he was dismissed from the army as opposed to the new regime. With the restoration of democracy in 1974, he was recommissioned and eventually retired as a major general. He was later promoted to honorary lieutenant general. Despite his own career in the arch-conservative special forces, and his family's royalist background, he became a close friend of the founder of the Panhellenic Socialist Movement, Andreas Papandreou, whose head of security he was. When Papandreou became the country's first socialist prime minister in 1981, Drossoyannis greatly helped in effectively controlling the largely conservative Greek officer corps.

In the Papandreou cabinets, he served as Vice Minister of National Defence from 21 October 1981 to 10 January 1984, when he became Alternate Minister of National Defence until 25 April 1986, during which time Papandreou himself held the portfolio of National Defence in tandem with his premiership. From 25 April 1986 until 22 June 1988, he was Minister of Public Order.

He was first elected to Parliament in the 1985 elections with PASOK (for his home prefecture of Phthiotis) and again in the elections of 1989, 1990 and 1993.

He died in November 2006.
