= Miltiadis Varvitsiotis =

Greek politician and attorney

Miltiadis Varvitsiotis Μιλτιάδης Βαρβιτσιώτης
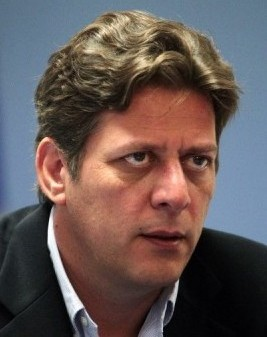

Alternate Minister for European Affairs
- In office 9 July 2019 – 26 May 2023
- Prime Minister: Kyriakos Mitsotakis
- Preceded by: Sia Anagnostopoulou

Minister for Shipping and Aegean
- In office 27 June 2023 – 27 January 2015
- Prime Minister: Antonis Samaras
- Preceded by: Kostis Moussouroulis
- Succeeded by: Giorgos Stathakis

Deputy Minister of Foreign Affairs
- In office January 2009 – October 2009
- Prime Minister: Kostas Karamanlis
- Minister: Dora Bakoyannis

Minister for Shipping and Aegean
- In office 27 June 2023 – 12 September 2023
- Preceded by: Theodore Kliares
- Succeeded by: Christos Stylianides

Personal details
- Born: 21 June 1969 (age 57) Glyfada, Athens, Greece
- Party: New Democracy
- Education: National and Kapodistrian University of Athens (LLB); Harvard University (ALM)

Miltiadis Varvitsiotis (Greek: Μιλτιάδης Βαρβιτσιώτης, Miltiádis Varvitsiótis; born June 21, 1969) is a Greek politician and attorney, who served as Alternate Minister of Foreign Affairs for European Affairs in the Cabinet of Kyriakos Mitsotakis, from 9 July 2019 to 26 May 2023. A member of the New Democracy, he is a Member of the Hellenic Parliament for Athens B2 (West Suburbs).

He previously served as Minister of Shipping and the Aegean (2013–2015) in the Cabinet of Antonis Samaras, and Deputy Minister of Foreign Affairs (2009) in the Cabinet of Kostas Karamanlis II.

== Early life and career ==
Miltiadis Varvitsiotis was born in Glyfada, Attica on June 21, 1969. He is son of former Minister Ioannis Varvitsiotis. In 1987, he graduated from Athens College. He studied Athens Law School of National and Kapodistrian University of Athens and earned a law degree in 1994. From 1994 to 1996, he attended Harvard Extension School, where he earned a master in International Relations, in 1996. He speaks English, French and Italian.

When he returned to Greece, he worked as an attorney.

== Political career ==
His political activity began at the Youth Organization of New Democracy. He was elected as member of the Hellenic Parliament on the New Democracy ticket in the Athens B constituency in the elections of 2000, 2004, 2007, 2009, May and June 2012, and January and September 2015. In the July 2019 election, he was elected MP for the Athens B2 (West) constituency.

=== Cabinet positions ===
Varvitsiotis, served as Deputy Minister of Foreign Affairs for Economic Diplomacy and Development Assistance, from January to October 2009, in the Second Cabinet of Kostas Karamanlis. He also served as Minister for Shipping, Maritime Affairs and the Aegean, from June 2013 to January 2015, in the Cabinet of Antonis Samaras. From July 2019 to May 2023, he served as Alternate Minister of Foreign Affairs in the Cabinet of Kyriakos Mitsotakis.

In 2023, Varvitsiotis resigned following a controversy over his comments about the death of a 36-year-old man who had fallen into the sea after being pushed back by crew members of a ship he was trying to board; Varvitsiotis had faced a backlash for appearing to sympathize with the crew members on Greek television.
