= Ioannis Vasileiadis =

Greek politician

Ioannis Vasileiadis Ιωάννης Βασιλειάδης MP

Minister of Public Order
- In office April 11, 1990 – August 8, 1991

Personal details
- Born: 1924 Aigio, Greece
- Died: 30 March 2012 (aged 88)
- Party: New Democracy
- Education: Hellenic Naval Academy

Ioannis Vasilεiadis (Greek: Γιάννης Βασιλειάδης; 1924 – 30 March 2012) was a Greek politician and former admiral who served as a Member of Parliament from 1985 to 1993. During this time he was deputy National Defense Minister with the government of July 1989, and Minister of Public Order from 1990 to 1991.

Political offices
Preceded by Dimitrios Manikas	Minister of Public Order; 1990–1991	Succeeded by Theodoros Anagnostopoulos
