= Anastasios Balkos =

Greek politician and Army General (1916-1995)

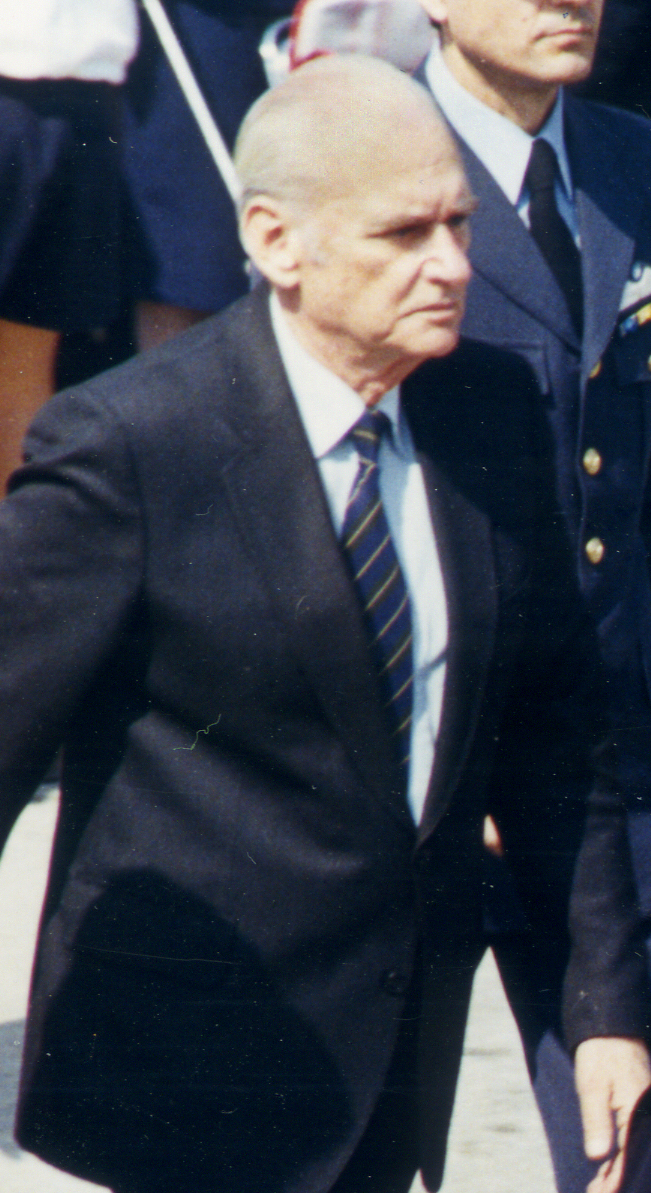
- Anastasios Balkos, 1990
- Born: 1916; Preveza, Greece
- Died: October 30, 1995 (aged 78–79); Athens, Greece
- Military career
- Allegiance: Greece
- Branch: Hellenic Army
- Service years: 1935–1977
- Rank: Lieutenant General

Anastasios Balkos (Greek: Αναστάσιος Μπάλκος, 1916 – 30 October 1995) was a Greek Army lieutenant general and conservative politician, who served as Greece's Minister of Public Order and as an intelligence officer in the Greek secret services.

== Biography ==
Anastasios Balkos was born in Preveza in 1916. He graduated from the Hellenic Military Academy and later attended various Greek and international military schools, including the United States Army Command and General Staff College at Fort Leavenworth, Kansas.

He fought in the Greco-Italian War in 1940–41, in the Greek Resistance with EDES in 1941–44, and in the Greek Civil War on the side of the Greek government against the communists.

In the postwar years, under the conservative governments of Marshal Alexander Papagos and Constantine Karamanlis (1952–63), Balkos served in the Counterespionage and Security Branch of the Greek Central Intelligence Service (KYP), which at the time had a bad reputation, due to its repression of the Greek Left in the virulently anti-communist climate following the Civil War.

After the restoration of democracy in 1974, Balkos established friendly relations with Karamanlis and with Defense Minister Evangelos Averoff, who had much influence among the Greek "hard Right". In January 1975, Balkos was appointed General Secretary of the Ministry of Public Order.

From 1977 until 1989, Balkos was a Member of Parliament for New Democracy, representing Preveza Prefecture, and also served as Minister of Public Order from November 1977 until May 1980.

In October 1981, he attacked the newly elected socialist Prime Minister Andreas Papandreou, because he appointed Yannis Skoularikis as Minister of Public Order; Skoularikis was a member of the communist-sponsored National Liberation Front (EAM) during the Nazi occupation and Balkos feared he would purge the security forces from conservatives in order to settle old scores.

He died in 1995, aged 79.
