= Petros Efthymiou =

Greek politician (born 1950)

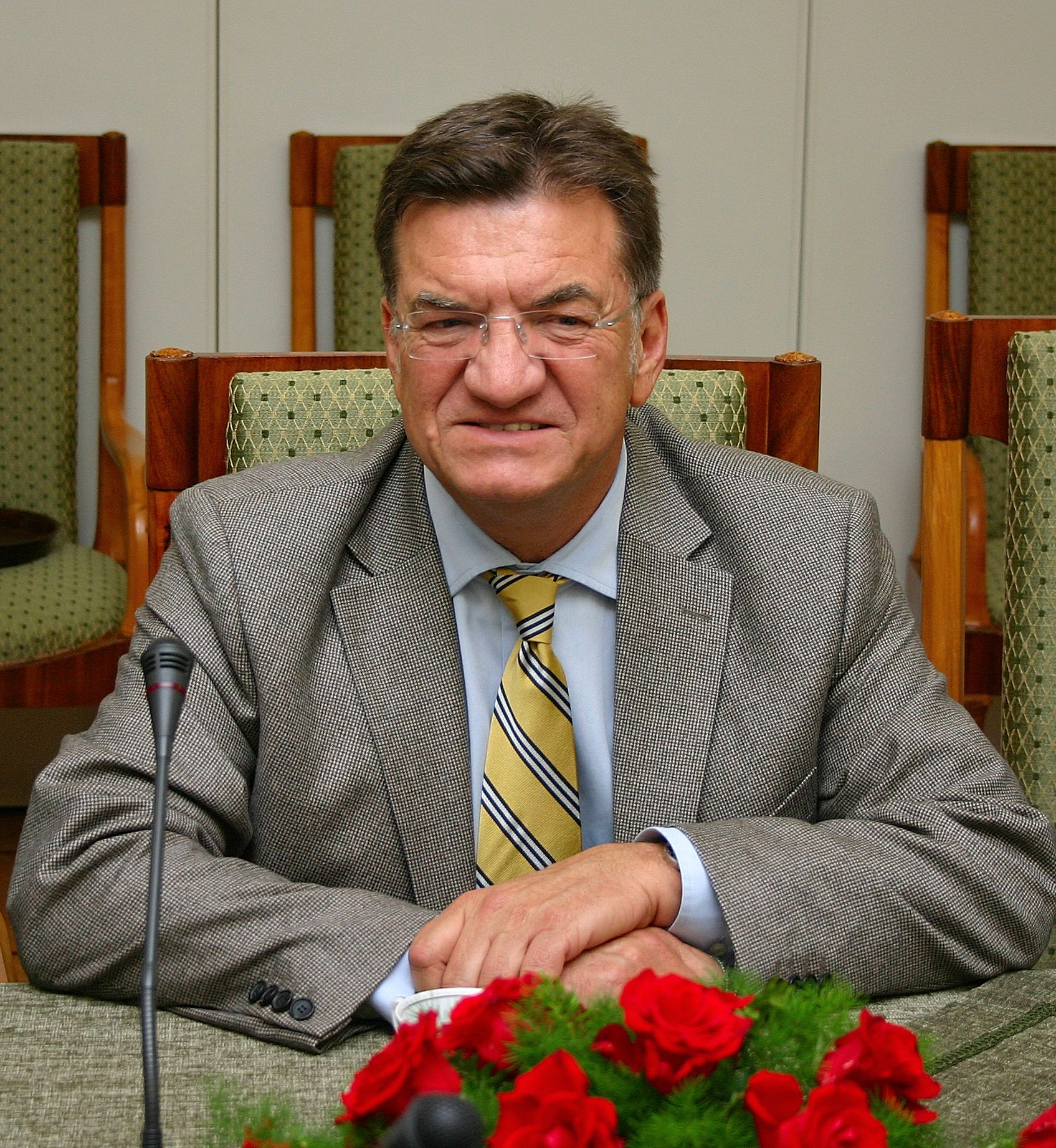
Petros Efthymiou (2010)

Petros Efthymiou (Greek: Πέτρος Ευθυμίου, born 27 March 1950) is a Greek academic and politician of the Panhellenic Socialist Movement. A former minister and MEP, he is currently (since October 2009) the parliamentary spokesman of his party.

== Early life ==
He was born in Larissa, Thessaly, and graduated from the Philosophical School of the University of Ioannina. In 1974, he was a founding member of the Panhellenic Socialist Movement (PASOK). Until 1979, he worked as a teacher of the Greek language in secondary education, as well as a journalist and editor for the party's Agonistis youth magazine and the Sosialistiki Poreia weekly newspaper.

== Career ==
In 1980-85 he was editor-in-chief of the political journal Anti. From 1982 he occupied the post of Special Advisor for Educational Issues at the Ministry of Youth and Sports, before being named Secretary General for Media at the Ministry for the Press and Media for a short term in 1985. From 1986 to 1999, he worked as political editor at the To Vima daily, and also as a talk show host for the NET public television network (1994–1999) and as a visiting lecturer at the Panteion University in 1994-95. In 1998, he was awarded the prize for “Excellency in Journalism”, by the President of the Hellenic Republic, Konstantinos Stefanopoulos.

At the 1999 European election he was elected to the European Parliament, serving until 11 April 2000, being a member in the Committee on Foreign Affairs, Human Rights, Common Security and Defense Policy and the Committee on Culture, Youth, Education, Media and Sports. Subsequently, and until PASOK's electoral defeat in March 2004, he occupied the post of Minister of National Education and Religious Affairs. In the same elections, he was for the first time elected as an MP for the Athens B constituency, being subsequently re-elected at the national elections of 16 September 2007 and 4 October 2009.

He served as Press Spokesman and Secretary of the Relations Sector of PASOK in 2006–2007, as well as coordinator of the Economy Sector in the PASOK Parliamentary Committee (2006) and as a member of the Standing Committees on Social Affairs (2007–2008), Financial Affairs, and the Committee for the Constitutional Amendment. He is currently a member of the Standing Committee on Defense and Foreign Affairs as well as member of the Standing Committee on Cultural and Educational Affairs, as well as the spokesman of PASOK's Parliamentary Group since October 2009.

Also he was elected President of the Parliamentary Assembly of the Organization for Security and Co-operation in Europe (O.S.C.E), in Oslo in July 2010.

== Personal life ==
He is married to the journalist Anastassia Parentzoglou and has two children, named Seline and Paul.

Preceded by Gerasimos Arsenis	Minister of National Education and Religious Affairs; 2000–2004	Succeeded by Marietta Giannakou
