= Antonis Roupakiotis =

Greek lawyer

Antonis Roupakiotis (Greek: Αντώνης Ρουπακιώτης) is a Greek lawyer from Athani, Lefkada, who was elected for two tenures as chairman of the Athens Bar Association, and is a member of the Hellenic Data Protection Authority.

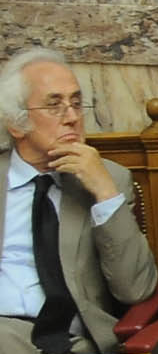
Antonis Roupakiotis.

On 17 May 2012, he was named as Minister of Labour and Social Security in the caretaker cabinet of Panagiotis Pikrammenos, which led the country until the June general election.

On 21 June 2012, he was sworn in as Justice Minister in the coalition cabinet of Antonis Samaras as one of the four ministers proposed by the Democratic Left. He remained in this post until the pull-out of Democratic Left from the government on 24 June 2013.
