= Kostis Hatzidakis =

Greek politician (born 1965)

- Κωστής Χατζηδάκης
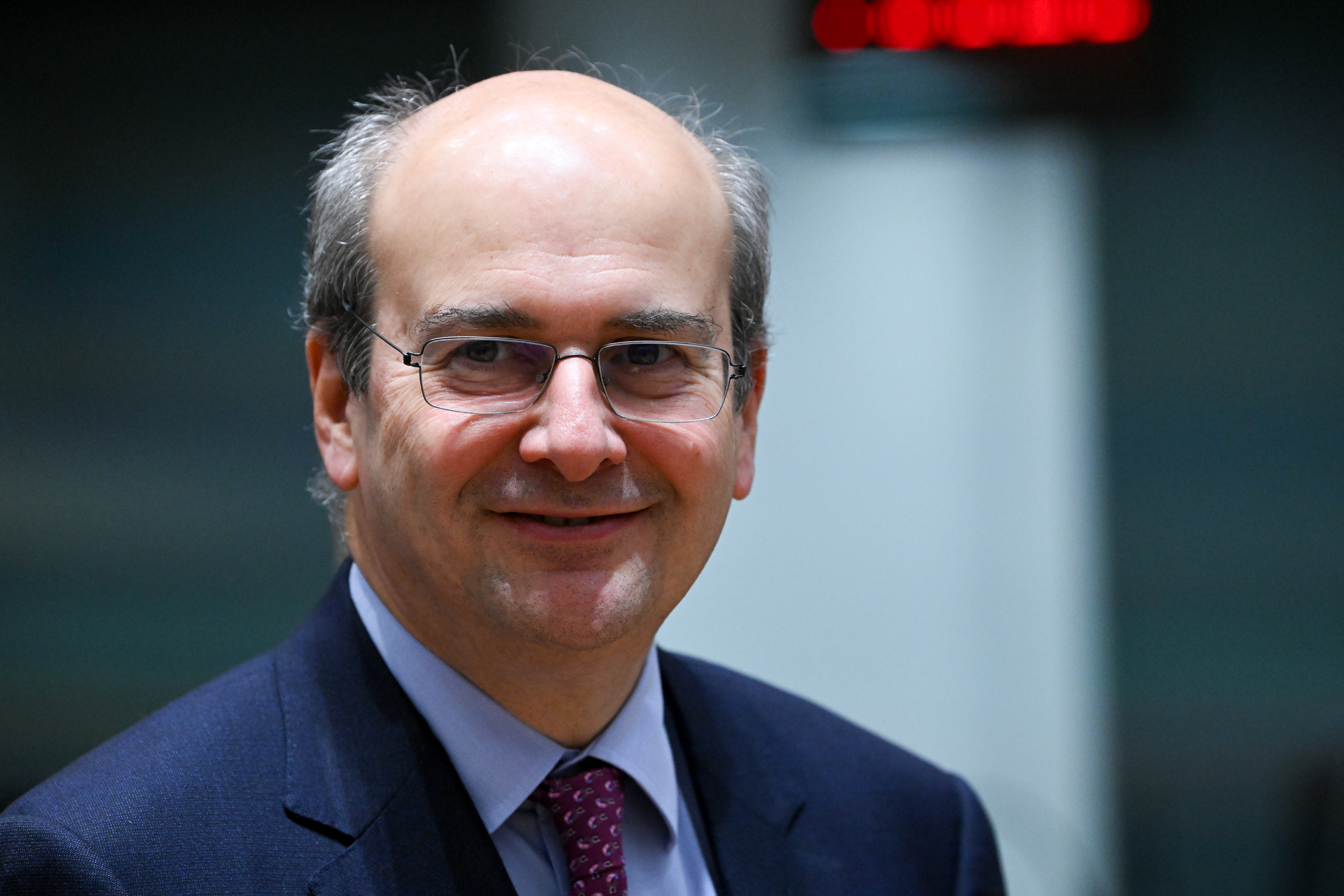
- Hatzidakis in 2024

Deputy Prime Minister of Greece
- Incumbent
- Assumed office 15 March 2025
- Prime Minister: Kyriakos Mitsotakis
- Preceded by: Panayiotis Pikrammenos (2023)

Minister of State
- Incumbent
- Assumed office 15 March 2025 Serving with Akis Skertsos
- Prime Minister: Kyriakos Mitsotakis
- Preceded by: Makis Voridis

Minister for the Νational Economy and Finance
- In office 27 June 2023 – 15 March 2025
- Prime Minister: Kyriakos Mitsotakis
- Preceded by: Theodore Pelagidis
- Succeeded by: Kyriakos Pierrakakis

Minister for Labor and Social Affairs
- In office 5 January 2021 – 26 May 2023
- Prime Minister: Kyriakos Mitsotakis
- Preceded by: Giannis Vroutsis
- Succeeded by: Patrina Paparrigopoulou

Minister for the Environment and Energy
- In office 9 July 2019 – 5 January 2021
- Prime Minister: Kyriakos Mitsotakis
- Preceded by: Giorgos Stathakis
- Succeeded by: Kostas Skrekas

Minister for Development and Competitiveness
- In office 25 June 2013 – 10 June 2014
- Prime Minister: Antonis Samaras
- Preceded by: himself (Development, Competitiveness, Infrastructure, Transport and Networks)
- Succeeded by: Nikos Dendias

Minister for Development, Competitiveness, Infrastructure, Transport and Networks
- In office 21 June 2012 – 25 June 2013
- Prime Minister: Antonis Samaras
- Preceded by: Yannis Stournaras (Development, Competitiveness and Shipping); Simos Simopoulos (Infrastructure, Transport and Networks)
- Succeeded by: himself (Development and Competitiveness); Michalis Chrisochoidis (Infrastructure, Transport and Networks)

Vice President of New Democracy
- Incumbent
- Assumed office 18 January 2016 Serving with Adonis Georgiadis
- President: Kyriakos Mitsotakis

Personal details
- Born: 20 April 1965 (age 61) Rethymno, Greece
- Party: New Democracy
- Education: University of Athens (LLB); University of Kent (LLM)
- Profession: Lawyer
- Website: khatzidakis.gr

Konstantinos (Kostis) Hatzidakis (Greek: Κωνσταντίνος (Κωστής) Χατζηδάκης; born 20 April 1965) is a Greek politician who currently serves as Deputy Prime Minister and Minister of State in the Second Cabinet of Kyriakos Mitsotakis. He also serves as Vice President of New Democracy, alongside Adonis Georgiadis.

He has previously served as a cabinet minister in numerous governments since 2007, with his portfolios including the infrastructure and transport, development, environment and energy, labor and national economy and finance ministries.

== Political career ==
Hatzidakis was elected President of the Youth Organisation of New Democracy (ONNED), serving from 1992 to 1994.

=== Member of the European Parliament, 1994–2007 ===
Hatzidakis was elected as a Member of the European Parliament (MEP) for New Democracy in the European elections of 1994, 1999 and 2004. During his time in parliament from 1994 until 2007, he served on the Committee on Regional Development. From 2004 until 2005. He was also a member of the Temporary committee on policy challenges and budgetary means of the enlarged Union 2007–2013. In addition to his committee assignments, he was part of the parliament's delegations to the EU-Cyprus Joint Parliamentary Committee (1994–1999); to the parliamentary cooperation committees for relations with Armenia, Azerbaijan and Georgia (1999–2004); and to the EU-Turkey Joint Parliamentary Committee.

=== Career in national politics ===
In the 2007 Greek legislative election, Hatzidakis was elected to the Hellenic Parliament for the Athens B constituency and consequently resigned from the European Parliament.

Hatzidakis served as Minister for Transport and Communications from 2007 to 2009 and then as Minister for Development in 2009.

On 15 December 2010, Hatzidakis was ambushed and assaulted by violent rioters during a general strike at the height of the Greek government-debt crisis.

=== Minister for the Environment and Energy, 2019–2021 ===
In his capacity as energy minister, Hatzidakis was tasked to work on a rescue plan for state-owned Public Power Corporation (PPC) which had been struggling with 2.7 billion euros ($2.99 billion) of unpaid bills from customers unable to pay during the country's financial crisis. From 2020, he also oversaw efforts to liquidate majority state-owned nickel producer LARCO, another company struggling under heavy debt, and then look for an investor for some of the company's assets. Under his leadership, Greece also began the sale of a minority stake in PPC-owned power distribution operator HEDNO and of power grid operator ADMIE in 2020.

=== Minister for Labor and Social Affairs, 2021–2023 ===
In May 2021, Hatzidakis introduced the government's plans to overhaul Greek labour laws by liberalizing working hours, including by introducing a "digital work card" to monitor employees working hours in real time as well as increasing legal overtime to 150 hours a year.

== Other activities ==
- European Investment Bank (EIB), Ex-Officio Member of the Board of Governors (2023–2025)
- European Stability Mechanism, Ex-Officio Member of the Board of Governors (2023–2025)
- International Monetary Fund (IMF), Ex-Officio Member of the Board of Governors (2023–2025)

Political offices
Preceded by Michalis Liapis	Minister for Transport and Communications; 2007–2009	Succeeded by Evripidis Stylianidis
Preceded by Christos Folias	Minister for Development; 2009	Succeeded by Louka Katseli as Minister for the Economy, Competitiveness and Shipping
Preceded by Yannis Stournaras as Minister for Development, Competitiveness and Shipping	Minister for Development, Competitiveness, Infrastructure, Transport and Networks; 2012–2013	Succeeded by Himself as Minister for Development and Competitiveness
Preceded by Simos Simopoulos as Minister for Infrastructure, Transport and Networks	Minister for Development, Competitiveness, Infrastructure, Transport and Networks; 2012–2013	Succeeded by Michalis Chrisochoidis as Minister for Infrastructure, Transport and Networks
Preceded by Himself as Minister for Development, Competitiveness, Infrastructure, Transport and Networks	Minister for Development and Competitiveness; 2013–2014	Succeeded by Nikos Dendias
Preceded by Giorgos Stathakis	Minister for the Environment and Energy; 2019–2021	Succeeded by Kostas Skrekas
Preceded by Giannis Vroutsis	Minister for Labor and Social Affairs; 2021–2023	Succeeded by Patrina Paparrigopoulou
Preceded by Theodore Pelagidis	Minister for Νational Economy and Finance; 2023–2025	Succeeded by Kyriakos Pierrakakis
Preceded by Panayiotis Pikrammenos	Deputy Prime Minister of Greece; 2025–present	Incumbent
Preceded by Makis Voridis	Minister of State; 2025–present	Incumbent
