= Ministry of Justice (Greece) =

Government ministry of Greece

- Υπουργείο Δικαιοσύνης

Agency overview
- Formed: April 1833
- Type: Ministry
- Jurisdiction: Government of Greece
- Headquarters: Athens; 37.991047°N 23.771306°E
- Employees: 11.780 (2024)
- Annual budget: 650.803.000 € (2025)
- Minister responsible: Giorgos Floridis
- Deputy Minister responsible: Giannis Bougas
- Agency executive: Pelops Laskos, Secretary General
- Child agencies: Forensic pathology service; National School of Judges; Society for the Protection of Minors
- Website: https://ministryofjustice.gr/English/

The Ministry of Justice (Greek: Υπουργείο Δικαιοσύνης, romanized: Ypourgeío Dikaiosýnis) is the government department entrusted with the supervision of the legal and judicial system of Greece. The incumbent minister is Giorgos Floridis independent, formerly member of PASOK and Prefector of Kilkis.

It was founded as the State Secretariat for Justice (Ἡ ἐπὶ τῆς Δικαιοσύνης Γραμματεία τῆς Ἐπικρατείας) on 25 January 1833, and later known as the Ministry of Justice (Katharevousa: Ὑπουργεῖον Δικαιοσύνης, Demotic: Υπουργείο Δικαιοσύνης). It was renamed the Ministry of Justice, Transparency and Human Rights (Greek: Υπουργείο Δικαιοσύνης, Διαφάνειας και Ανθρωπίνων Δικαιωμάτων) in October 2009 under George Papandreou, but was restored to its previous name in July 2019 by Kyriakos Mitsotakis.

== List of ministers ==
=== Justice (1974–2009) ===
Name	Took office	Left office	Party	Notes
Konstantinos Papakonstantinou	24 July 1974	9 October 1974	New Democracy	National unity government
Georgios Oikonomopoulos	9 October 1974	21 November 1974	New Democracy	National unity government
Konstantinos Stefanakis	21 November 1974	21 October 1977	New Democracy	
Spyridon Gangas	21 October 1977	28 November 1977	New Democracy	
Georgios Stamatis	28 November 1977	17 September 1981	New Democracy	
Solon Rangas	17 September 1981	21 October 1981	New Democracy	
Efstathios Alexandris	21 October 1981	5 July 1982	PASOK	
Georgios-Alexandros Mangakis	5 July 1982	22 May 1984	PASOK	
Nikolaos Papantoniou	22 May 1984	21 June 1984	PASOK	
Georgios-Alexandros Mangakis	21 June 1984	9 May 1985	PASOK	
Konstantinos Kounougeris	9 May 1985	5 June 1985	PASOK	
Miltiadis Papaioannou	5 June 1985	26 July 1985	PASOK	
Georgios-Alexandros Mangakis	26 July 1985	25 April 1986	PASOK	
Apostolos Kaklamanis	25 April 1986	5 February 1987	PASOK	
Eleftherios Veryvakis	5 February 1987	23 September 1987	PASOK	
Menios Koutsogiorgas	23 September 1987	18 November 1988	PASOK	
Vasileios Rotis	18 November 1988	17 March 1989	PASOK	
Ioannis Skoularikis	17 March 1989	2 June 1989	PASOK	
Konstantinos Stamatis	2 June 1989	2 July 1989	Independent	
Fotis Kouvelis	2 July 1989	12 October 1989	Greek Left	Coalition government
Konstantinos Stamatis	12 October 1989	11 April 1990	Independent	Caretaker government and national unity government
Athanasios Kanellopoulos	11 April 1990	8 August 1991	New Democracy	
Michalis Papakonstantinou	8 August 1991	7 August 1992	New Democracy	
Ioannis Varvitsiotis	7 August 1992	3 December 1992	New Democracy	
Anna Benaki-Psarouda	3 December 1992	14 September 1993	New Democracy	
Georgios Plagianakos	14 September 1993	13 October 1993	New Democracy	
Georgios Kouvelakis	13 October 1993	10 February 1995	PASOK	
Anastasios Peponis	10 February 1995	15 September 1995	PASOK	
Ioannis Pottakis	15 September 1995	22 January 1996	PASOK	
Evangelos Venizelos	22 January 1996	30 August 1996	PASOK	
Anargyros Fatouros	30 August 1996	25 September 1996	PASOK	
Evangelos Giannopoulos	25 September 1996	20 March 2000	PASOK	
Dimitrios Gourgourakis	20 March 2000	13 April 2000	Independent	
Michael Stathopoulos	13 April 2000	24 October 2001	PASOK	
Filippos Petsalnikos	24 October 2001	10 March 2004	PASOK	
Anastasios Papaligouras	10 March 2004	19 September 2007	New Democracy	
Sotirios Hatzigakis	19 September 2007	7 January 2009	New Democracy	
Nikos Dendias	8 January 2009	7 October 2009	New Democracy	

=== Justice, transparency and human rights (2009–2019) ===
Name	Took office	Left office	Party	Notes
Haris Kastanidis	7 October 2009	17 June 2011	PASOK	Cabinet of George Papandreou
Miltiadis Papaioannou	17 June 2011	17 May 2012	PASOK	National unity government from 11 November
Christos Geraris	17 May 2012	21 June 2012	Independent	Pikrammenos caretaker cabinet
Antonis Roupakiotis	21 June 2012	25 June 2013	Independent, proposed by DIMAR	Samaras cabinet
Haralambos Athanasiou	25 June 2013	27 January 2015	New Democracy	Samaras cabinet
Nikos Paraskevopoulos	27 January 2015	27 August 2015	Syriza	First Tsipras cabinet
Dimitris Papangelopoulos	28 August 2015	21 September 2015	Independent	Thanou caretaker cabinet
Nikos Paraskevopoulos	23 September 2015	5 November 2016	Syriza	Second Tsipras cabinet
Stavros Kontonis	5 November 2016	29 August 2018	Syriza	Second Tsipras cabinet
Michalis Kalogirou	29 August 2018	9 July 2019	Syriza	Second Tsipras cabinet

=== Justice (since July 2019) ===
Name	Took office	Left office	Party	Notes
Konstantinos Tsiaras	9 July 2019	25 May 2023	New Democracy	Cabinet of Kyriakos Mitsotakis
Philip Spyropoulos	26 May 2023	26 June 2023	Independent	Caretaker Cabinet of Ioannis Sarmas
Giorgos Floridis	27 June 2023		Independent, formerly PASOK	Second Cabinet of Kyriakos Mitsotakis
