= Nikolaos Sifounakis =

Greek politician

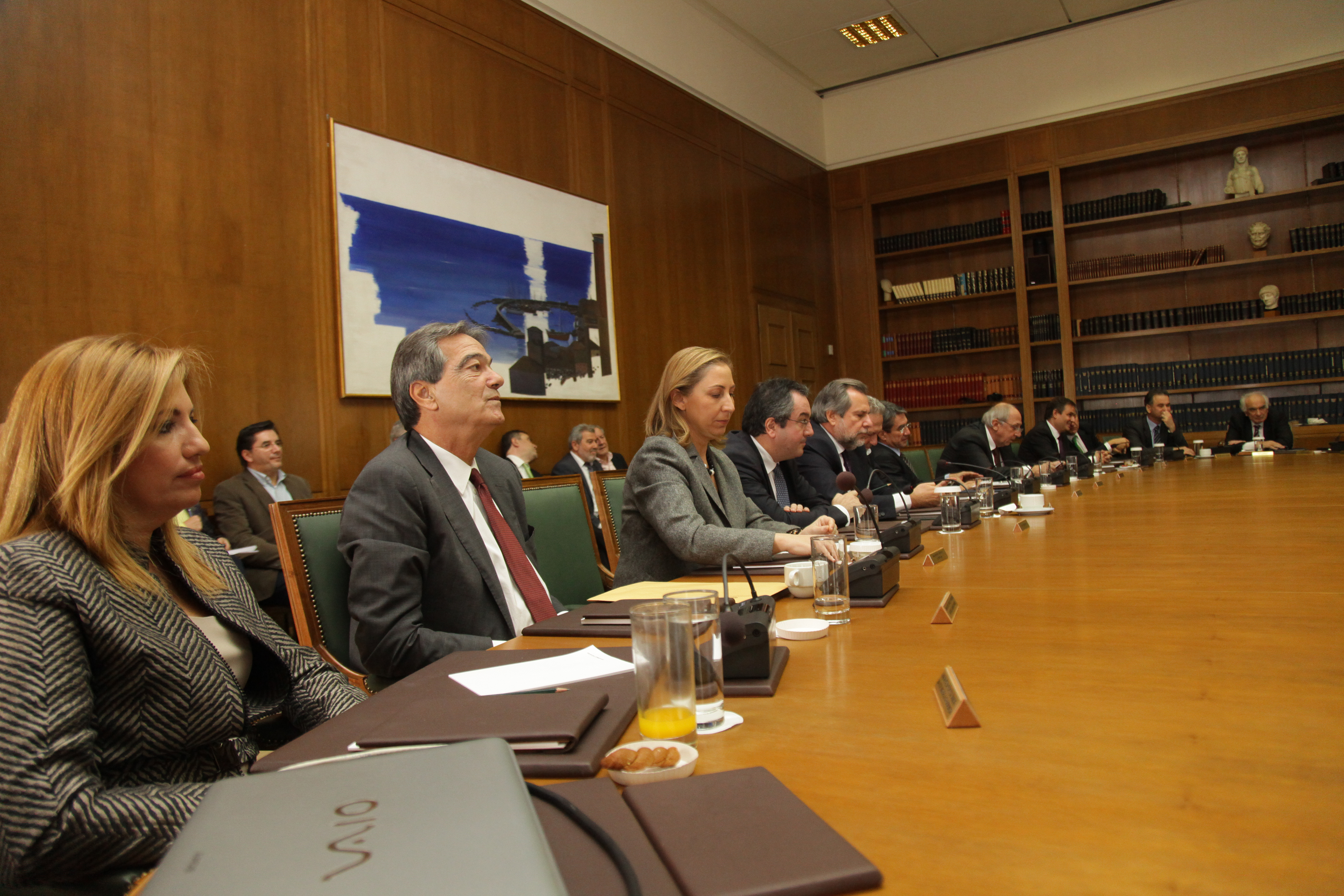
Nikolaos Sifounakis (second from the left) during a cabinet meeting in 2011

Nikolaos Sifounakis (Greek: Νικόλαος Σηφουνάκης) (born 21 December 1949 in Rethymno) is a Greek politician, former Minister for the Aegean and ex-member of the European Parliament (MEP). He was elected on the Panhellenic Socialist Movement ticket and sat with the Party of European Socialists group. On 23 July 2004 he was elected Chair of the Committee on Culture and Education.

In the 2007 Greek legislative election he was elected to the Greek Parliament for Lesbos, and consequently resigned from the European Parliament.
