= Marietta Giannakou =

Greek politician (1951–2022)

Marietta Giannakou MP
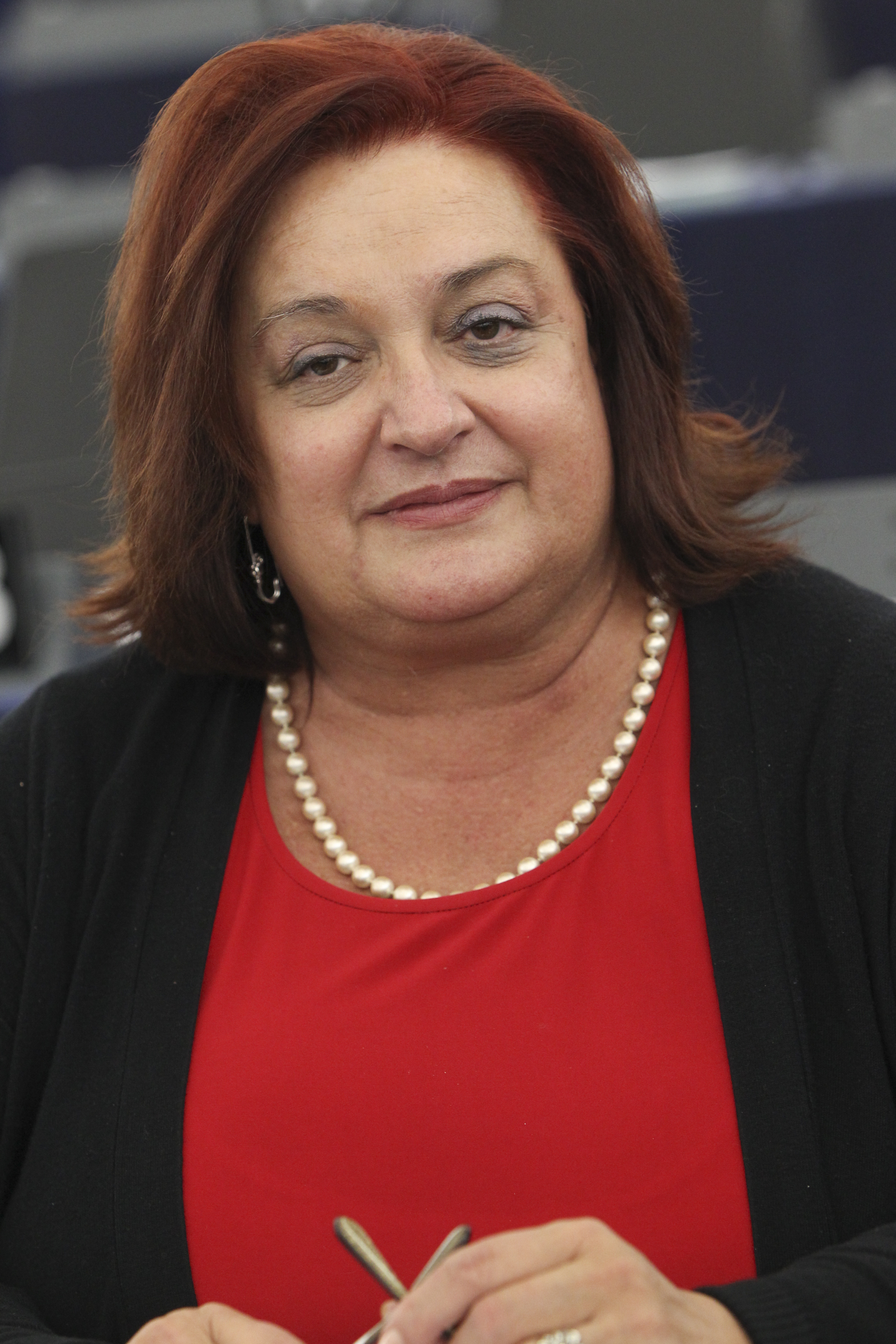

Member of the European Parliament
- In office 14 July 2009 – 2014

Minister for National Education and Religious Affairs of Greece
- In office 10 March 2004 – 19 September 2007
- Preceded by: Petros Efthimiou
- Succeeded by: Evripidis Stilianidis

Minister for Health, Welfare and Social Security of Greece
- In office 11 April 1990 – 8 August 1991
- Preceded by: Georgios Merikas
- Succeeded by: Georgios Sourlas

Personal details
- Born: 6 June 1951 Geraki Lakonias, Greece
- Died: 27 February 2022 (aged 70) Athens, Greece
- Party: New Democracy
- Spouse: Panagiotis Koutsikos (1983–1997)
- Children: One daughter
- Profession: Neurologist-Psychiatrist
- Website: www.giannakou.gr

Marietta Giannakou (Greek: Μαριέττα Γιαννάκου, 6 June 1951 – 27 February 2022) was a Greek politician, member of New Democracy. She served as Minister for National Education and Religious Affairs of Greece.

== Biography ==
She was born in Geraki Lakonias and became a doctor and neuro-psychologist at the Faculty of Medicine at the University of Athens. She has been a member of the Greek Parliament, vice-chairman of the Parliamentary Committee on European Affairs, a member of the Parliamentary Committee on Foreign Affairs and National Defence, and a member of the Interparty Parliamentary Committee on the examination of the drugs problem. Moreover, she was the chairman of the Greek Friendship Group between the Parliaments of Greece and Poland and member of the Greek Friendship Groups between the Parliaments of Greece and the United States and of Greece and Morocco. National Coordinator and Member of the Horizontal Working Party on Drugs of the Council of the European Union. Chairman of the Balkans/Middle East Regional Group of the Dublin Group of the Council of the European Union. Member of the Political Bureau of the European People's Party. She was a former Minister of Health, Welfare and Social Security. She was also a member of the European Parliament, as well as the head of the Delegation of the New Democracy Party in the European Parliament. She used to be the chairman of the European Committee "Fourth World", as well as the former vice-president of the European Christian Democratic Union. In her lifetime, she published numerous scientific articles and reports pertaining to European perspectives towards drug problems, organized crime, women in contemporary societies, as well as social policies.

Giannakou was appointed Minister for National Education and Religious Affairs on 10 March 2004. She tried to change the law so that private universities will be recognized because private universities are forbidden by the 1975 constitution. Her educational policy led to massive demonstrations by students and teachers.

Giannakou failed to win a seat in the September 2007 parliamentary election and lost her position in the Cabinet.

On 6 February 2008, due to an older injury on her right leg, she entered the Henry Dunant hospital of Athens. On 7 February, the doctors were unable to restore its former condition and proceeded to an amputation below the knee. Further complications led to an above knee amputation. She had an uncomplicated recovery and she returned to active politics.

In May 2009, she was chosen to lead the New Democracy EP list and she was subsequently elected as 1 of the 22 Greek MEPs. In November 2020 she was elected vice-president of the NATO Parliamentary Assembly.

Giannakou died in Athens on 27 February 2022, at the age of 70.

Political offices
Preceded by Georgios Merikas	Minister for Health, Welfare and Social Security; 1990–1991	Succeeded by Georgios Sourlas
Preceded by Petros Efthymiou	Minister for National Education and Religious Affairs; 2004–2007	Succeeded by Evripidis Stilianidis
