= Giorgos Floridis =

Greek politician and lawyer

- Γιώργος Φλωρίδης
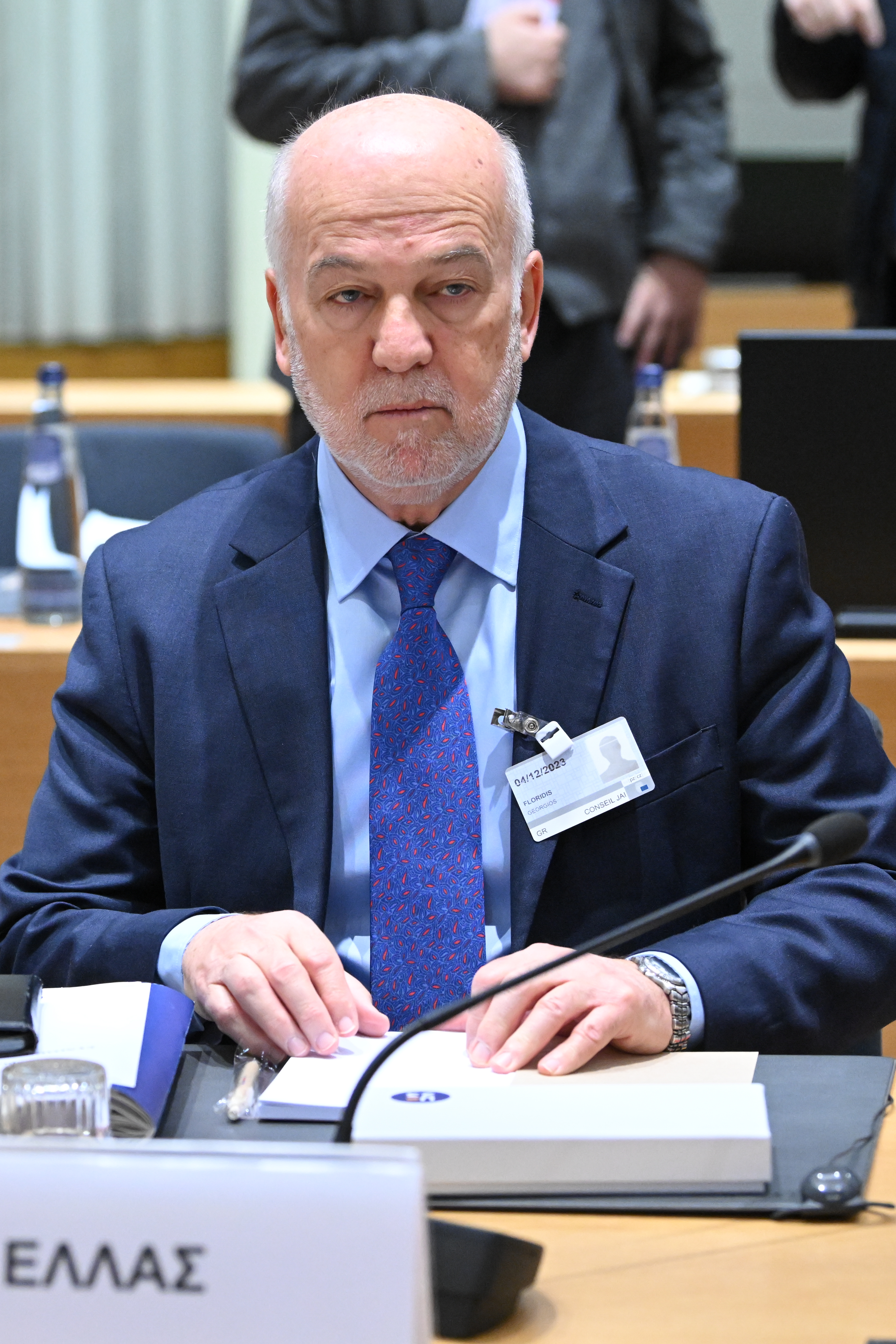
- Floridis in 2023

Minister of Justice
- Incumbent
- Assumed office 27 June 2023
- Preceded by: Philip Spyropoulos

Personal details
- Born: 4 June 1956 (age 70) Stavrochori, Kilkis
- Party: Independent
- Other political affiliations: PASOK
- Education: Aristotle University of Thessaloniki

Giorgos Floridis (born June 4, 1956) is a Greek lawyer and centrist politician currently serving as Minister of Justice in Kyriakos Mitsotakis' government.

== Biography ==
Giorgos Floridis was born on June 4, 1956, in Stavrochori, Kilkis, and studied law, first at the Democritus University of Thrace and later at the Aristotle University. After graduating, he practiced law in both Kilkis and Thessaloniki. In 1994, he ran in the local elections and won the position of Kilkis Prefect, but resigned two years later in 1996 to participate in the national elections with PASOK.

From 1996 to 2007, George Floridis was repeatedly elected as a Member of Parliament for Kilkis while also serving as Deputy Minister of Interior, Public Administration and Decentralization, Culture (responsible for Sports), National Economy and Finance, and Minister of Public Order. In 2010, due to disagreements with then-PASOK leader George Papandreou, he resigned from his parliamentary seat and left the party, returning to his legal practice, primarily in Kilkis and Thessaloniki. In 2015, he rejoined PASOK with a position on the state ballot, but the party’s low electoral results prevented his election.

Floridis, after participating in two political initiatives (the first in 2015 when he co-founded the political party "Social League" with Yiannis Stournaras, and the second in 2017 when he, along with Yiannis Ragousis and Anna Diamantopoulou, created the "Decision Time" movement), appears to have abandoned the center-left, from which he emerged as a proponent of the modernizing Simitis bloc, and aligned himself with the so-called "extreme centrists," a group of PASOK-affiliated figures who sharply criticized SYRIZA while gradually adopting positions closer to those of Kyriakos Mitsotakis. His admiration for Mitsotakis’s politics led him to accept the position of Minister of Justice offered by the Prime Minister in his second government.

According to Floridis, Mitsotakis took the best elements from both the center and the center-left and combined them into a policy that encompasses the patriotic, the progressive, and the popular, while stripping the Left of its monopoly on social sensitivity.
