= Giannis Diamantidis =

Greek politician (born 1948)

Giannis Diamantidis MP
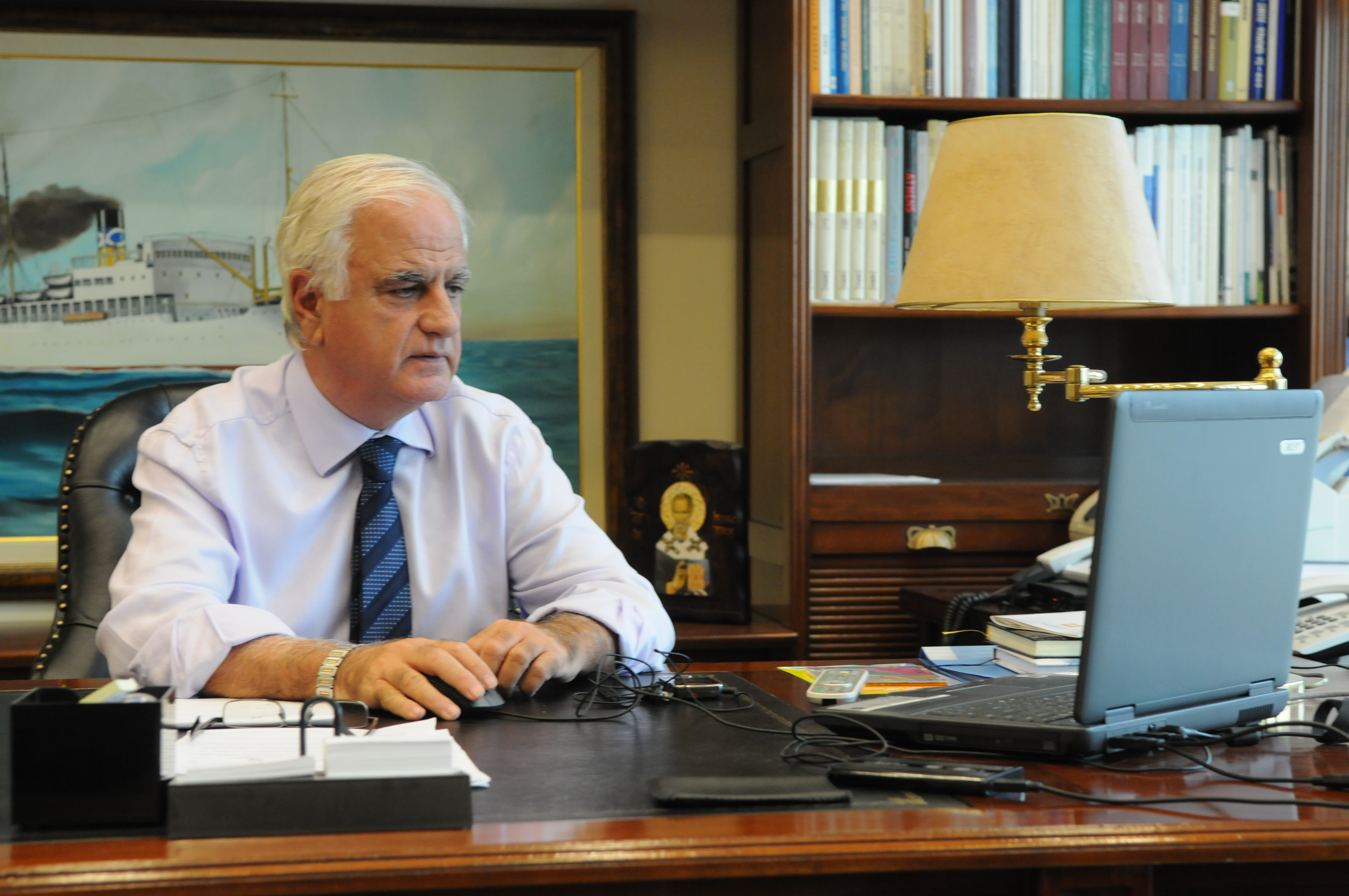

Minister for Maritime Affairs, Islands and Fisheries
- In office 7 September 2010 – 17 June 2011
- President: Karolos Papoulias
- Prime Minister: George Papandreou

Personal details
- Born: 1948 (age 77–78) Nikaia, Attica, Greece
- Party: Panhellenic Socialist Movement
- Education: National and Kapodistrian University of Athens
- Profession: Economist, Politician
- Website: www.gdiamantidis.gr

Giannis Diamantidis (Greek: Γιάννης Διαμαντίδης, born 1948) is a Greek politician of the Panhellenic Socialist Movement and the former Minister for Maritime Affairs, Islands and Fisheries of Greece.

== Life ==
Diamantidis was born in 1948 in Nikaia, Greece. He is the son of Dimitris Diamantidis, a former Member of Parliament, and Polyxeni Leontiadou. He studied at the Department of Economics and Political Sciences of the National and Kapodistrian University of Athens. During the Greek military junta of 1967–1974, he took part in the Law School protests of March 1973 against the regime.

Giannis Diamantidis has been continuously elected as a member of the Hellenic Parliament between 1989 (November) and 2012 for the Panhellenic Socialist Movement (PASOK) in the Piraeus B constituency. In the cabinet reshuffle of 7 September 2010, he was chosen to head the revived Ministry of Maritime Affairs, Islands and Fisheries, his first cabinet post. He held the position until 17 June 2011, when the ministry was again merged with the Ministry of Regional Development and Competitiveness to form the Ministry of Development, Competitiveness and Shipping.
