= Efstathios Alexandris =

Greek politician and lawyer (1921-2013)

- Born: April 7, 1921; Amfissa
- Died: July 20, 2013 (aged 92); Athens
- Occupations: Lawyer, politician
- Movement: Panhellenic Socialist Movement

Efstathios Alexandris (Greek: Ευστάθιος Αλεξανδρής; April 7, 1921, in Amfissa – July 20, 2013) was a Greek politician, lawyer and member of the Panhellenic Socialist Movement. Alexandris was a member of the Hellenic Parliament from 1977 to 1989. He also served as the Minister of Justice of Greece from October 21, 1981, to July 5, 1982, as well as Minister for Mercantile Marine from 26 July 1985 to 23 September 1987.

Alexandris died in Athens, Greece, on July 20, 2013, at the age of 92.
