= Ministry of Maritime Affairs and Insular Policy (Greece) =

Government ministry of Greece

- Υπουργείο Ναυτιλίας και Νησιωτικής Πολιτικής
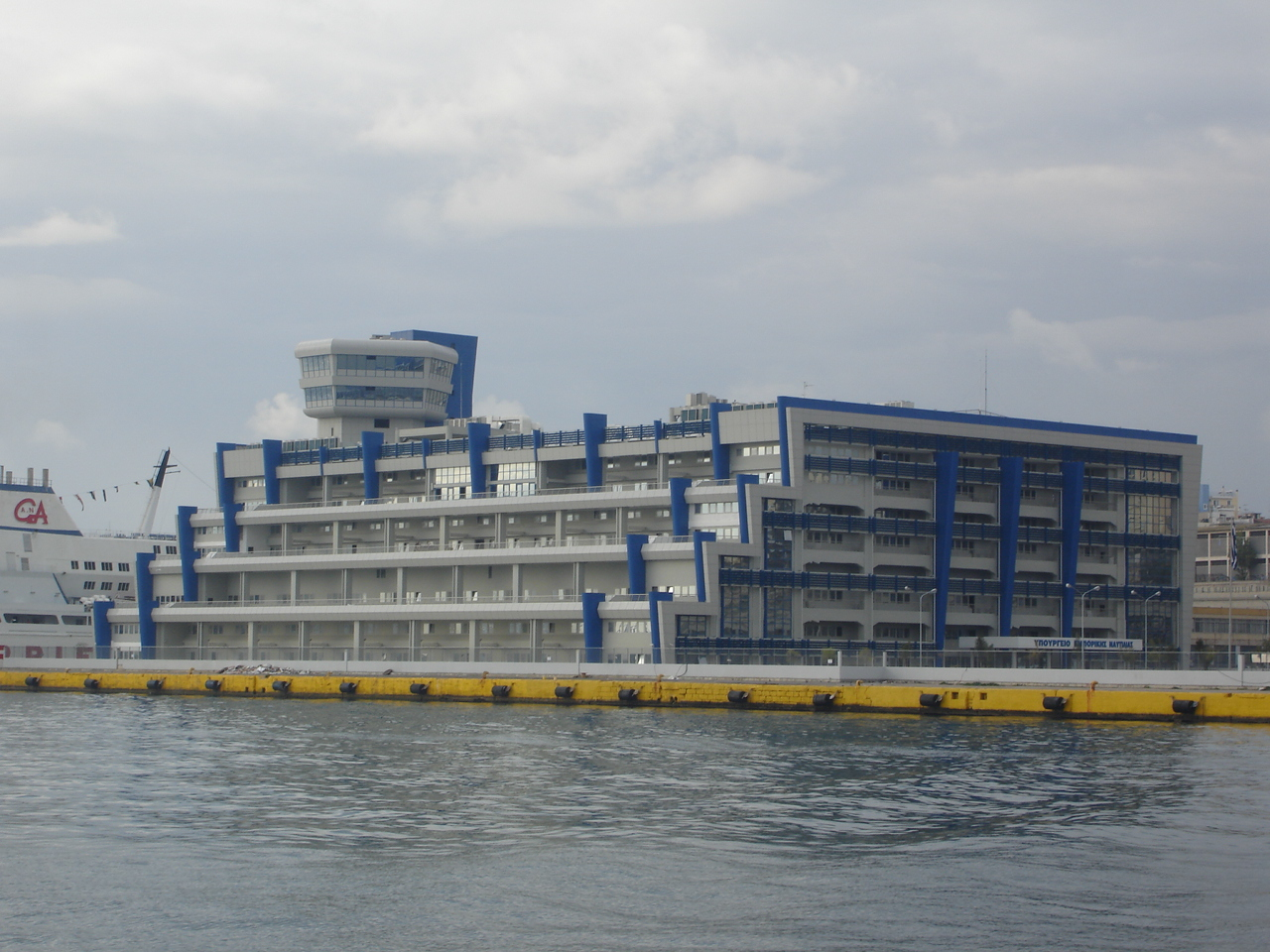
- The headquarters of the Ministry at the Port of Piraeus

Agency overview
- Formed: September 2015
- Preceding agency: Ministry of the Economy, Infrastructure, Shipping and Tourism (Jan. - Sept. 2015)
- Jurisdiction: Government of Greece
- Status: active
- Headquarters: Drapetsona
- Employees: 8.744 (2024)
- Annual budget: 651.864.000 € (2025)
- Minister responsible: Vasilis Kikilias
- Deputy Minister responsible: Stefanos Gkikas
- Agency executives: Evangelos Kyriazopoulos, Secretary General of Maritime Affairs and Ports; Manolis Koutoulakis, Secretary General of the Aegean and Island Policy
- Child agencies: Hellenic Coast Guard; Hellenic Chamber of Shipping; Institute of Maritime History
- Website: www.ynanp.gr/en/

The Ministry of Maritime Affairs and Insular Policy (Greek: Υπουργείο Ναυτιλίας και Νησιωτικής Πολιτικής) is a government department of Greece responsible for managing the nation's maritime and shipping sectors, as well as developing policies concerning the country's numerous islands. This ministry also oversees the enforcement of maritime laws and regulations, and the safety of Greek waters and coasts.

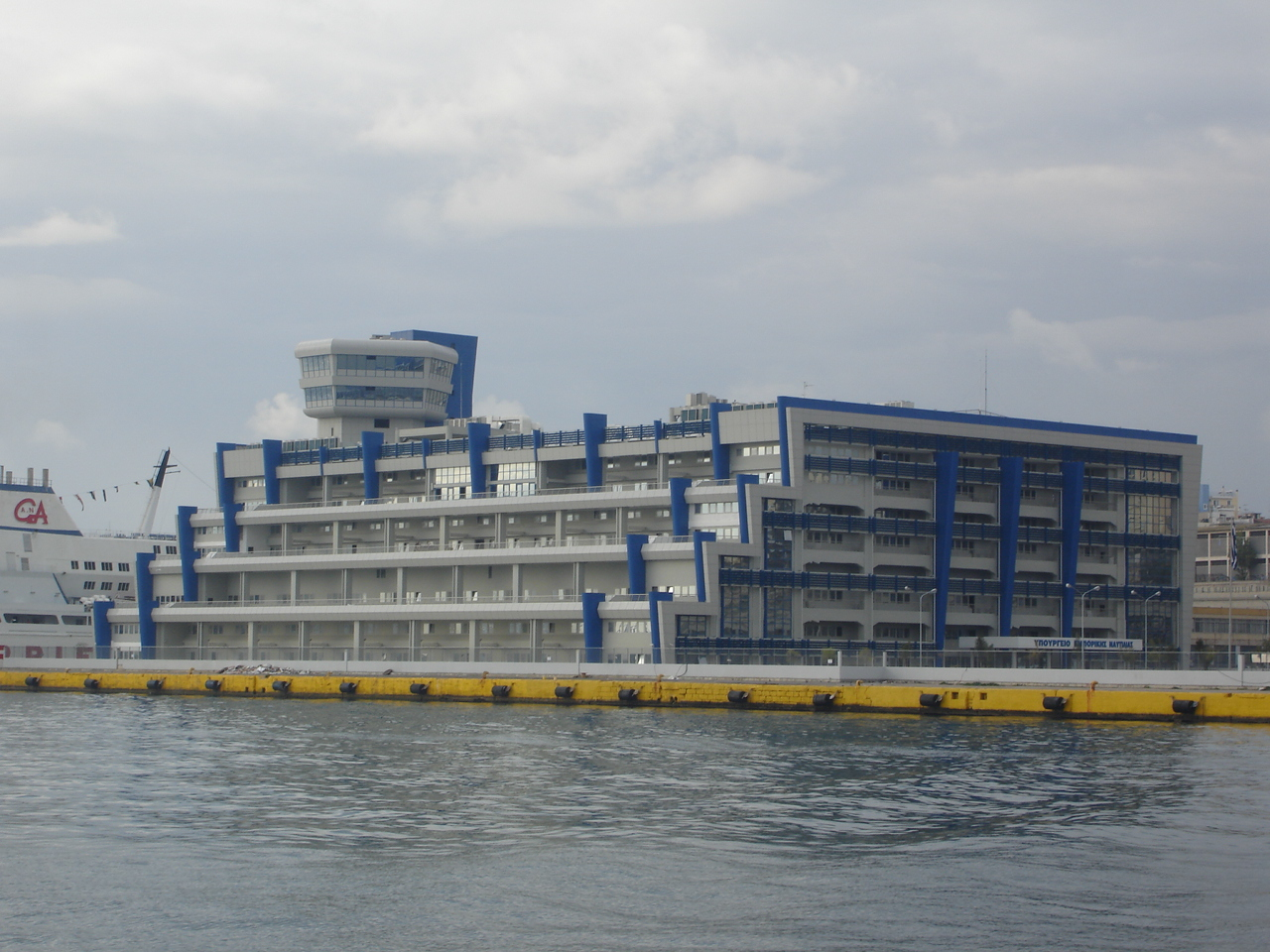
The headquarters of the Ministry of Shipping at the Port of Piraeus.

== History ==
It was founded as the Mercantile Marine Ministry (Υπουργείο Εμπορικής Ναυτιλίας) in 1936. On 19 September 2007, it was merged with the Ministry for the Aegean and Island Policy (Υπουργείο Αιγαίου και Νησιωτικής Πολιτικής) to form the Mercantile Marine, Aegean and Island Policy Ministry (Υπουργείο Εμπορικής Ναυτιλίας, Αιγαίου και Νησιωτικής Πολιτικής). The latter was abolished on 7 October 2009 and the shipping portfolio fell under the new Ministry of the Economy, Competitiveness and Shipping. It was re-established as the Ministry of Maritime Affairs, Islands and Fisheries (Υπουργείο Θαλασσίων Υποθέσεων, Νήσων και Αλιείας) on 30 September 2010, but was again abolished on 27 June 2011 and merged with the Ministry of Regional Development and Competitiveness to form the Ministry of Development, Competitiveness and Shipping. It was re-established as the Ministry of Shipping and the Aegean Greek: Υπουργείο Ναυτιλίας και Αιγαίου) on 21 June 2012, but was again abolished on 26 January 2015 and merged into the Ministry of the Economy, Infrastructure, Shipping and Tourism. On 23 September 2015, it was re-established as the Μinistry of Maritime Affairs and Insular Policy in the Second Cabinet of Alexis Tsipras.

== Functions ==
The Ministry of Shipping and Island Policy is responsible for a range of issues related to Greece's maritime and shipping industries, and the development of policies for its islands. Some functions:

- Managing and promoting the Greek merchant navy and commercial shipping operations, including personnel training, ship safety, and industry regulation.
- Overseeing the development and implementation of policies concerning Greece's islands, addressing issues like transportation, infrastructure, and local economies.
- Coordinating maritime security efforts and responding to maritime emergencies.
- Managing Greece's ports and harbors, including infrastructure development and maintenance.

== List of ministers ==
=== Mercantile marine ===
Name	Took office	Left office	Party	Notes
Georgios Katsifaras	5 July 1982	5 June 1985	PASOK	
Gerasimos Arsenis	5 June 1985	26 July 1985	PASOK	also National Economy Minister and Minister for Finance
Efstathios Alexandris	26 July 1985	23 September 1987	PASOK	
Evangelos Giannopoulos	23 September 1987	18 November 1988	PASOK	
Vasileios Sarantitis	18 November 1988	17 March 1989	PASOK	
Antonios Dedidakis	17 March 1989	2 July 1989	PASOK	
Aristotelis Pavlidis	2 July 1989	12 October 1989	New Democracy	Tzannetakis coalition government
Nikolaos Pappas	12 October 1989	11 April 1990		Grivas caretaker government and Zolotas national unity government
Konstantinos Mitsotakis	11 April 1990	1 October 1990	New Democracy	
Aristotelis Pavlidis	1 October 1990	3 December 1992	New Democracy	
Alexandros Papadongonas	3 December 1992	13 October 1993	New Democracy	
Georgios Katsifaras	13 October 1993	22 January 1996	PASOK	Third Papandreou cabinet
Kosmas Sfyrios	22 January 1996	25 September 1996	PASOK	First Simitis cabinet
Stavros Soumakis	25 September 1996	13 April 2000	PASOK	Second Simitis cabinet
Christos Papoutsis	13 April 2000	24 October 2001	PASOK	Third Cabinet of Costas Simitis
Georgios Anomeritis	24 October 2001	7 July 2003	PASOK	Third Cabinet of Costas Simitis
Georgios Paschalidis	7 July 2003	10 March 2004	PASOK	Third Cabinet of Costas Simitis
Manolis Kefalogiannis	10 March 2004	19 September 2007	New Democracy	First Cabinet of Kostas Karamanlis

=== Mercantile marine, the Aegean and island policy (2007–2009) ===
Name	Took office	Left office	Party	Notes
Georgios Voulgarakis	19 September 2007	13 September 2008	New Democracy	Second Cabinet of Kostas Karamanlis
Anastasios Papaligouras	13 September 2008	7 October 2009	New Democracy	Second Cabinet of Kostas Karamanlis

=== Maritime affairs, islands and fisheries (2010–2011) ===
Name	Took office	Left office	Party	Notes
Giannis Diamantidis	30 September 2010	27 June 2011	PASOK	Cabinet of George Papandreou

=== Shipping and the Aegean (2012–2015) ===
Name	Took office	Left office	Party	Notes
Konstantinos Mousouroulis	21 June 2012	25 June 2013	New Democracy	Cabinet of Antonis Samaras
Miltiadis Varvitsiotis	25 June 2013	27 January 2015	New Democracy	Cabinet of Antonis Samaras

=== Shipping and the Aegean (alternates, January–September 2015) ===
Name	Took office	Left office	Party	Notes
Thodoris Dritsas	27 January 2015	27 August 2015	Syriza	First Cabinet of Alexis Tsipras
Christos Zois	28 August 2015	21 September 2015	New Reformist Radical Reconstruction	Thanou caretaker cabinet

=== Ministry of Maritime Affairs and Insular Policy (since September 2015) ===
Name	Took office	Left office	Party	Notes
Thodoris Dritsas	23 September 2015	5 November 2016	Syriza	Second Cabinet of Alexis Tsipras
Panagiotis Kouroumblis	5 November 2016	29 August 2018	Syriza	Second Cabinet of Alexis Tsipras
Fotis Kouvelis	29 August 2018	9 July 2019	Syriza	Second Cabinet of Alexis Tsipras
Ioannis Plakiotakis	9 July 2019	26 May 2023	New Democracy	Cabinet of Kyriakos Mitsotakis
Theodore Kliares	26 May 2023	27 June 2023	Independent	Caretaker Cabinet of Ioannis Sarmas
Miltiadis Varvitsiotis	27 June 2023	12 September 2023	New Democracy	Second Cabinet of Kyriakos Mitsotakis, resigned due to the homicide in the port of Piraeus
Christos Stylianides	12 September 2023	15 May 2025	New Democracy	Second Cabinet of Kyriakos Mitsotakis
Vasilis Kikilias	15 March 2025	incumbent	New Democracy	Second Cabinet of Kyriakos Mitsotakis

== See also ==
- Ministry for Naval Affairs (Greece)
