= Simos Simopoulos =

Greek politician (died 2020)

Simos Simopoulos (died 25 September 2020) was a Greek politician who served as Minister of infrastructure and Transport in the Caretaker Cabinet of Panagiotis Pikrammenos and as Rector of the National Technical University of Athens from 2010 to 2014.
