= Units for the Reinstatement of Order =

Special division of the Hellenic Police mainly for riot control

The Units for the Reinstatement of Order (Greek: Μονάδες Αποκατάστασης Τάξης, Monades Apokatastasis Taksis, MAT) are a special division of the Hellenic Police, whose primary and most infamous role is that of riot control.

They were the first special police units founded in Greece. They were created to lift the burden from other bodies of police and armed forces from involvement in riots, illegal gatherings and demonstrations. The MAT are known as "matatzides" (Greek: ματατζήδες) or "matades" (Greek: ματάδες). The idea of creating them belongs to the junta-appointed Prime Minister Spyros Markezinis and the mandate to implement and create the first group was given in 1976 by the then Prime Minister Konstantinos Karamanlis. The force was significantly augmented by Prime Minister Andreas Papandreou, to eventually three times the original size under the Costas Simitis government. During the 1980s, the MAT lost favor and were temporarily substituted by the "Special Mission Units" (Μονάδες Ειδικών Αποστολών, MEA). Since the early 1990s however, they resumed their role as the primary riot control units of the Police.

== History ==
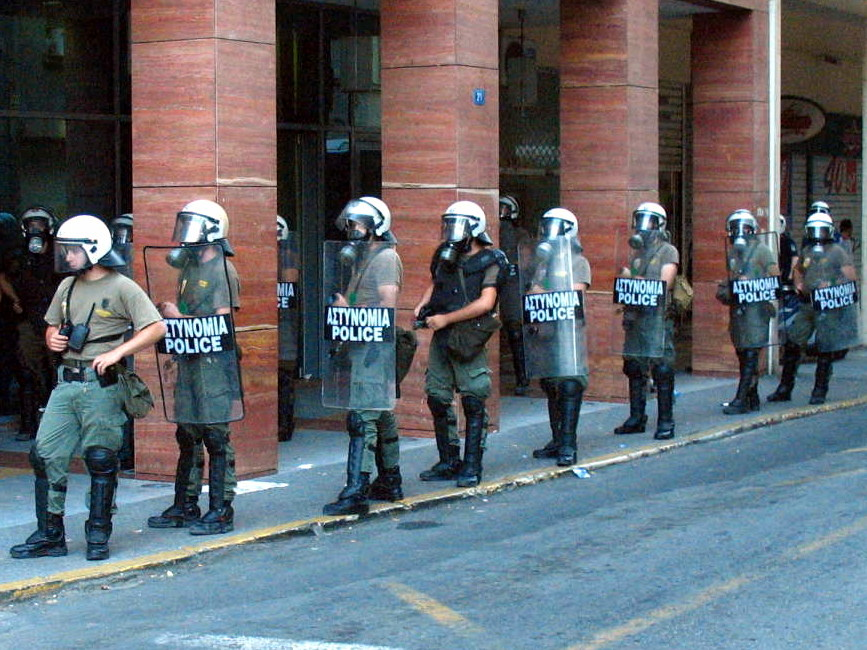
Men of MAT

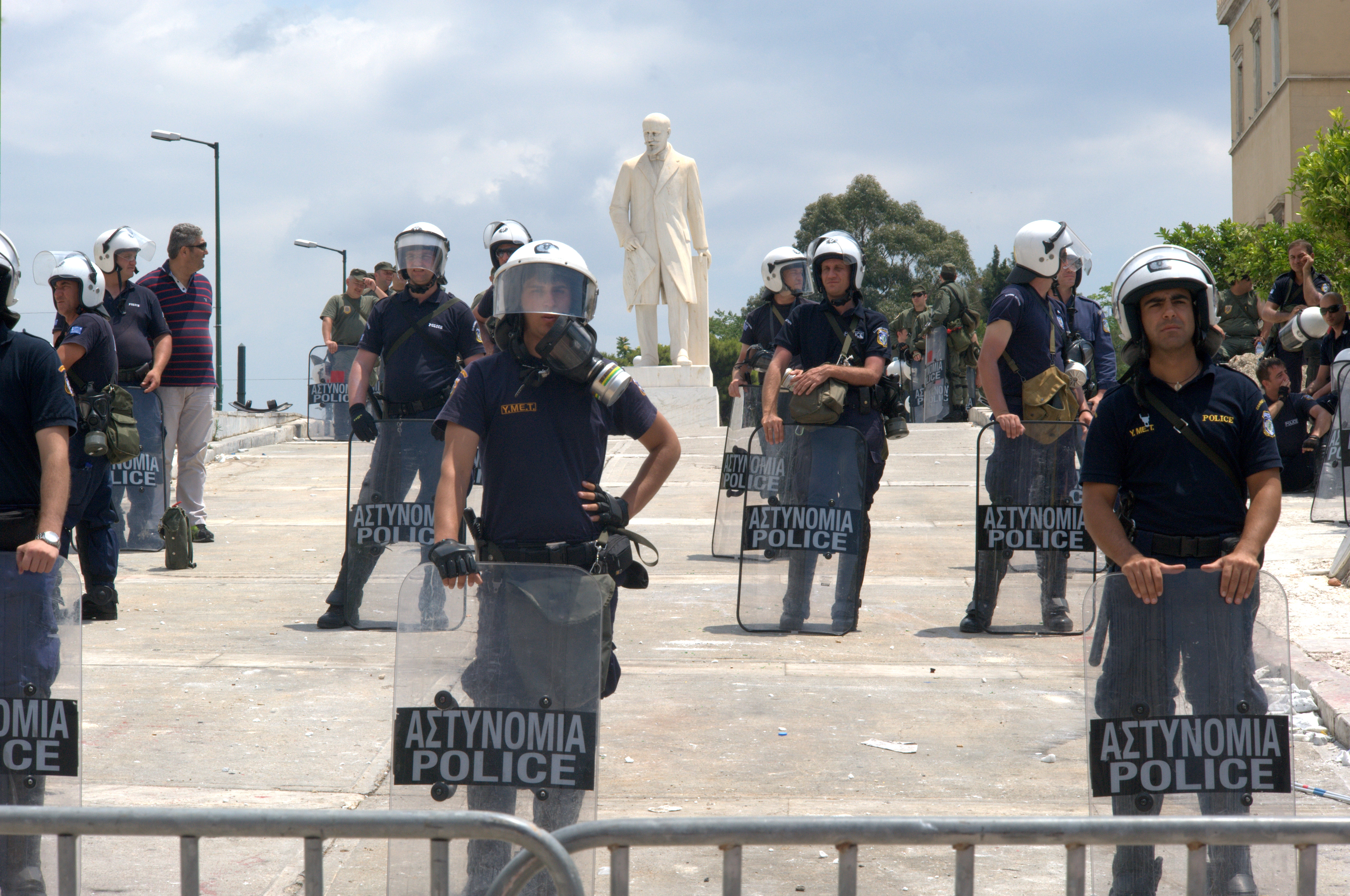
Men of MAT

The suppression of the demonstrations until the dictatorship was done by policemen or gendarmes, only with clubs, with the assistance of special vehicles of the fire brigade, while only in serious cases the army intervened. There was no tear gas (which was then unknown in Greece), in extreme cases, warning shots were fired in the air, and rarely against the crowd. The Athens riots of 1960 led to the first investigations of other means to disrupt a demonstration. Three police officers Ilias Psychogios, Georgios Sambanis, and Theodoros Harlaftis were sent for training to the United States. The first would be responsible for the education of the MAT several years later, while the second would become commander of the body.

In his memoirs, Spyros Markezinis, junta-appointed Prime Minister in 1973, argues that if he had time to make the MAT, then the events of the Athens Polytechnic uprising, which led to the downfall of the junta would have possibly been avoided.

The MAT formed at the behest of Karamanlis shortly after the fall of the dictatorship, by ministerial order. The idea of their name belonged to the later Minister Anastasios Balkos. This unit consisted of 100-150 men from various subdivisions of Police, to whom later men of Special Forces troops were added. A second unit was created in Thessaloniki, while the Greek Gendarmerie manned a third for a period of time.

These units were trained by Ilias Psychogios, according to his textbooks and experience from the training he had received in the US several years earlier.

In 1978, after the unsuccessful intervention of the police at the home of anarchist doctor Vassilis Tsironis, which resulted in his death, the Special Mission Units (MEA) were created. After the rise of the Panhellenic Socialist Movement to power in 1981 MEA substituted MAT for some time. The MEA wore a brown-green uniform with turtleneck sweaters, but sometimes they appeared plainclothes. The MEA were abolished by the 1990-1993 New Democracy conservative government, because its officers were mostly PASOK supporters.

In the 1990s, the group YMET were created as supportive in squads of MAT as well as the Group of Crime Prevention and Suppression (OPKE), similar to but more heavily equipped riot police and with more specialized training.

== Equipment ==
The MAT have special equipment to suppress demonstrations including shields, tear gas, helmets, stockings, plastic material and other components that protect the torso of the body (mainly shoulders and arms) from hits. Each man also bears his service weapon, gas masks, a sufficient number of tear gas and flash-bangs, handcuffs. Some of the squad members have a fire extinguisher. One or two in each squad have a special tear gas spray (known as "bellows") and do not carry a shield. When the platoon is on hold or perform custodial tasks, riot the MAT wear black berets instead of helmets.

The commanding officer of each squad does not bear all of the above equipment (shield, protective body) to be able to move easily and quickly in the field and have full oversight of the development of the company. Instead the officer has a radio and is in constant contact with the headquarters in the Police Department.
