= Georgios Katsifaras =

Greek politician (1935–2012)

Georgios Katsifaras (Greek: Γεώργιος Κατσιφάρας; 1935 – August 8, 2012) was a Greek politician, born in Kalentzi. He was Minister for Mercantile Marine from 1982 to 1985, and Minister for Trade in 1986. Katsifaras died in Athens on August 8, 2012, aged 77.
