= Giorgos Adamopoulos =

Greek lawyer and politician (1946–2023)

Member of the Hellenic Parliament
- In office 18 June 1989 – 14 March 2000
- Constituency: Larissa

Personal details
- Born: 1946 Larissa, Greece
- Died: 24 February 2023 (aged 76–77) Larissa, Greece
- Party: PASOK
- Education: National and Kapodistrian University of Athens
- Occupation: Lawyer

Giorgos Adamopoulos (Greek: Γιώργος Αδαμόπουλος; 1946 – 24 February 2023) was a Greek politician. A member of PASOK, he served in the Hellenic Parliament from 1989 to 2000.

Adamopoulos died in Larissa on 24 February 2023.
