= Christos Markogiannakis =

Greek Author of Crime, living in France

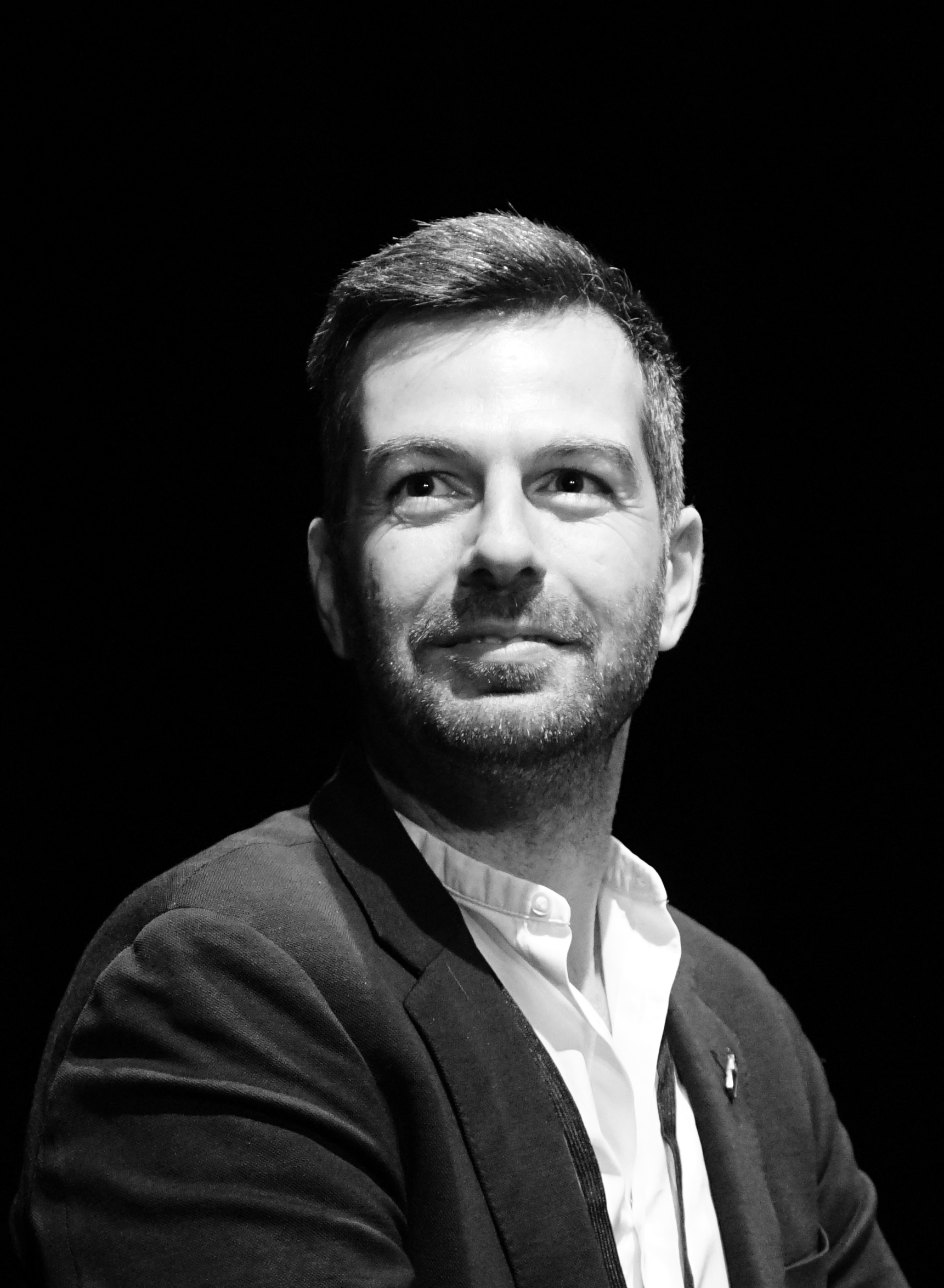
Christos Markogiannakis

Christos Markogiannakis (Greek: Χρήστος Μαρκογιαννάκης) (born 28 January 1980) is a Greek novelist and criminartist, based in Paris, France. His work includes crime fiction and non-fiction. His books are published in Greek, French, English, Italian, German, Arabic and Russian. He is a member of the Crime Writers’ Association. In 2025, he was named Chevalier de l' Ordre des Arts et des Lettres (Knight of the Order of Arts and Letters) by the French Ministry of Culture.

== Career ==
Christos Markogiannakis studied Law and Criminology in Greece and France. He worked as a criminal lawyer in Crete and currently lives in Paris. He is the creator of the term Criminart, a theoretical mix of art and crime, focusing on the representation of murder in works of art and on murder as a form of art, according to the disciplines of Thomas De Quincey. His criminartistic book Scènes de Crime au Louvre / The Louvre Murder Club (Le Passage Editions, 2017), where he analyses paintings, sculptures and ancient Greek amphorae in the Louvre Museum in Paris, was awarded the 2017 French Prize for Literary Essay (Prix National du Document Littéraire). The book was welcomed by the Press for its original point of view.

The Louvre Murder Club was followed by Scènes de Crime à Orsay / The Orsay Murder Club in 2018 (Le Passage Editions, 2018) with works of art from the Orsay Museum in Paris.

His crime fiction takes place in contemporary Greece and follows the investigations of a Police Captain, Christophoros Markou. His writing style is inspired by Agatha Christie , and his books are a hybrid between a Whodunit and a Mediterranean Noir, focusing on the investigation, the psychology of the characters and current social conditions.

His first crime novel Au 5e étage de la faculté de droit (Albin Michel, 2018) received the prize of the Académie du Var in 2018.

His crime novel Qui a tué Lucy Davis? (Plon 2022) received the Prix Méditerranée du Polar in 2023.

His novel Omero, le fils caché (Plon 2023) is a what if story inspired by the alleged son Maria Callas and Aristotle Onassis had in the early days of their affair, in 1960. The baby died a few hours after his birth, and Christos Markogiannakis invents his life, had he survived. The novel combines the principles of ancient Greek tragedy and contemporary mystery fiction.

His non-fiction A Short History of the World in 50 Murders (O'Mara Books 2026) explores how fifty historical murder cases from antiquity to the 1980s changed the world and the way we see it.

== Publications ==
Scènes de crime au Louvre (Le Passage, 2017)

The Louvre Murder Club (Le Passage, 2017)

Au 5e étage de la faculté de droit (broché) (Albin Michel, 2018) Au 5e étage de la faculté de droit (poche) (Livre de Poche, 2020)

Scènes de crime à Orsay (Le Passage, 2018)

The Orsay Murder Club (Le Passage, 2018)

Mourir en scène (Albin Michel, 2020)

Μυθιστόρημα με Κλειδί (Εκδόσεις Μίνωας 2021)

Στον 5ο όροφο της Νομικής (Εκδόσεις Μίνωας 2022)

Qui a tué Lucy Davis? (Plon 2022) Prix Méditerranée du Polar 2023)

Mord unter griechischer Sonne (OKTOPUS bei Kampa 2022)

Auteur de crimes (Plon 2023)

Θάνατος επί σκηνής (Εκδόσεις Μίνωας 2023)

Omero, le fils caché (Plon 2023)

O δολοφόνος στις σελίδες (Εκδόσεις Μίνωας 2024)

Oμέρο, ο κρυφός γιος (Εκδόσεις Ψυχογιός 2025)

Omero, il figlio segreto (Crocetti Editore 2025)

Όλα τα μάτια πάνω μου (Εκδόσεις Ψυχογιός 2026)

Les yeux sur moi (Fayard 2026)

A Short History of the World in 50 Murders (O'Mara Books 2026)
