= Ministry of Infrastructure and Transport (Greece) =

Government ministry of Greece

- Υπουργείο Υποδομών και Μεταφορών

Agency overview
- Formed: November 2016
- Preceding agency: Ministry Infrastructure, transport and networks (September 2015 - November 2016)
- Type: Ministry
- Jurisdiction: Government of Greece
- Headquarters: Papagou, Athens
- Employees: 3.348 (2024); 4. 514 (2016)
- Annual budget: 2.694.810.000 (2025)
- Ministers responsible: Christos Dimas; Konstantinos Kyranakis, Alternate minister
- Deputy Minister responsible: Nikos Tachiaos
- Child agencies: General Secretariat for Infrastructure; General Secretariat for Transport
- Website: www.yme.gr

The Ministry of Infrastructure and Transport (Greek: Υπουργείο Υποδομών και Μεταφορών) is a government department of Greece headquartered in Cholargos, Athens.

The ministry is currently headed by Christos Dimas.

== History ==
The ministry is the successor of the old Ministry of Transport and Communications (Υπουργείο Μεταφορών και Επικοινωνιών), with which the public works portfolio of the Ministry for the Environment, Physical Planning and Public Works was merged on 7 October 2009. A further merger with the Ministry of Development and Competitiveness created the Ministry of Development, Competitiveness, Infrastructure, Transport and Networks on 21 June 2012, but this was reversed on 25 June 2013.

== List of ministers ==
=== Transport and communications ===
Name	Took office	Left office	Party	Notes
Nikos Gelestathis	11 April 1990	3 December 1992	New Democracy	
Theodoros Anagnostopoulos	3 December 1992	13 October 1993	New Democracy	
Ioannis Charalambous	13 October 1993	8 July 1994	Panhellenic Socialist Movement	
Theodoros Pangalos	8 July 1994	15 September 1994	Panhellenic Socialist Movement	
Athanasios Tsouras	15 September 1994	15 September 1995	Panhellenic Socialist Movement	
Evangelos Venizelos	15 September 1995	22 January 1996	Panhellenic Socialist Movement	
Haris Kastanidis	22 January 1996	2 September 1997	Panhellenic Socialist Movement|	
Anastasios Mantelis	2 September 1997	13 April 2000	Panhellenic Socialist Movement	
Christos Verelis	13 April 2000	10 March 2004	Panhellenic Socialist Movement	
Michalis Liapis	10 March 2004	19 September 2007	New Democracy	
Kostis Hatzidakis	19 September 2007	8 January 2009	New Democracy	
Evripidis Stylianidis	8 January 2009	7 October 2009	New Democracy	

=== Infrastructure, transport and networks (2009–2012) ===
Name	Took office	Left office	Party	Notes
Dimitris Reppas	7 October 2009	17 June 2011	Panhellenic Socialist Movement	
Giannis Ragousis	17 June 2011	11 November 2011	Panhellenic Socialist Movement	
Makis Voridis	11 November 2011	17 May 2012	New Democracy	
Simos Simopoulos	17 May 2012	21 June 2012		

=== Development, competitiveness, infrastructure, transport and networks (2012–2013) ===
Name	Took office	Left office	Party	Notes
Kostis Hatzidakis	21 June 2012	25 June 2013	New Democracy	Cabinet of Antonis Samaras

=== Infrastructure, transport and networks (2013–2015) ===
Name	Took office	Left office	Party	Notes
Michalis Chrisochoidis	25 June 2013	27 January 2015	Panhellenic Socialist Movement	Coalition Cabinet of Antonis Samaras

=== Ministry of Economy, Infrastructure, Shipping and Tourism (Jan.-Sep. 2015) ===
Name	Took office	Left office	Party	Notes
Giorgos Stathakis	27 January 2015	28 August 2015	Syriza	First cabinet of Alexis Tsipras
Nikos Christodoulakis	28 August 2015	23 September 2015	Independent	Caretaker Cabinet of Vassiliki Thanou-Christophilou

=== Infrastructure, transport and networks (2015–2016) ===
Name	Took office	Left office	Party	Notes
Christos Spirtzis	23 September 2015	5 November 2016	Syriza	Second Cabinet of Alexis Tsipras

=== Infrastructure and transport (since 2016) ===
Name	Took office	Left office	Party	Notes
Christos Spirtzis	5 November 2016	9 July 2019	Syriza	Second Cabinet of Alexis Tsipras
Kostas Karamanlis	9 July 2019	1 March 2023	New Democracy	Resigned due to the Tempi train crash
Giorgos Gerapetritis	1 March 2023	25 May 2023	New Democracy	
Yannis Gollias	26 May 2023	26 June 2023	None	Caretaker Cabinet of Ioannis Sarmas
Christos Staikouras	27 June 2023	15 March 2025	New Democracy	Second Cabinet of Kyriakos Mitsotakis
Christos Dimas	15 March 2025		New Democracy	Second Cabinet of Kyriakos Mitsotakis

== Subordinate agencies ==
- Air Accident Investigation and Aviation Safety Board
