= Ministry of Citizen Protection (Greece) =

Government ministry of Greece

- Υπουργείο Προστασίας του Πολίτη

Agency overview
- Formed: October 2009
- Type: Ministry
- Jurisdiction: Government of Greece
- Headquarters: Athens; 37.99011°N 23.77698°E
- Employees: 61.423 (2024)
- Annual budget: 2.285.820.000 € (2025)
- Minister responsible: Michalis Chrisochoidis
- Vice minister responsible: Giannis Lampropoulos
- Agency executives: Panagiotis Stathis (Lieutenant General (retired)), Secretary General of Public Order; Aristos Perris (Lieutenant General (retired)), Secretary General for Anticrime Policy
- Child agencies: Hellenic Police; Correctional Service; Border Guarding Services
- Website: https://www.minocp.gov.gr/en/

The Ministry of Citizen Protection (Greek: Υπουργείο Προστασίας του Πολίτη, romanized: Ypourgeío Prostasías tou Polítī) is the government department responsible for Greece's public security services.

The ministry existed until 2007 as the Ministry of Public Order (Greek: Υπουργείο Δημόσιας Τάξης, romanized: Ypourgeío Dīmósias Táxīs). On 19 September 2007, it was merged with the Ministry of the Interior, Public Administration and Decentralization and reduced to a General Secretariat within the Ministry of the Interior. On 7 October 2009, it was revived as the Ministry of Citizen Protection (Υπουργείο Προστασίας του Πολίτη, Ypourgeío Prostasías tou Polítī) and was eventually renamed as the Ministry of Public Order and Citizen Protection on 21 June 2012. Following the electoral victory of Syriza in January 2015, it was subordinated to the Ministry of the Interior and Administrative Reconstruction and was headed by an Alternate Minister (Αναπληρωτής Υπουργός, Anaplīrōtī́s Ypourgós). In August 2018, it was reorganized as an independent ministry and was revived as the Ministry of Citizen Protection (Υπουργείο Προστασίας του Πολίτη, Ypourgeío Prostasías tou Polítī). The incumbent minister in the Second Cabinet of Kyriakos Mitsotakis is Michalis Chrisochoidis, a member of the Hellenic Parliament for the Athens B2 constituency with New Democracy. Chrisochoidis has served in the role four times previously, as a member of PASOK and an independent politician.

== List of ministers ==
=== Public order (1974–1985) ===
Name	Took office	Left office	Party
Solon Gikas	July 24, 1974	January 5, 1976	
Georgios Stamatis	January 5, 1976	November 28, 1977	
Anastasios Balkos	November 28, 1977	May 10, 1980	
Dimitrios Davakis	May 10, 1980	September 17, 1981	
Ioannis Katsadimas (as Acting Minister)	September 17, 1981	October 21, 1981	
Ioannis Skoularikis	October 21, 1981	May 9, 1985	PASOK
Alexandros Floros (as Acting Minister)	May 9, 1985	June 5, 1985	
Athanasios Tsouras	June 5, 1985	July 26, 1985	PASOK

=== Interior and public order (1985–1986) ===
Name	Took office	Left office	Party
Agamemnon Koutsogiorgas	July 26, 1985	April 25, 1986	PASOK

=== Public order (1986–2007) ===
Name	Took office	Left office	Party
Antonis Drosogiannis	April 25, 1986	June 22, 1988	PASOK
Anastasios Sechiotis	June 22, 1988	November 8, 1988	
Georgios Petsos	November 18, 1988	March 17, 1989	
Apostolos Tsochatzopoulos	March 17, 1989	June 2, 1989	
Panagiotis Markopoulos (as Acting Minister)	June 2, 1989	July 2, 1989	
Ioannis Kefalogiannis	July 2, 1989	October 12, 1989	
Dimitrios Manikas	October 12, 1989	April 11, 1990	
Yiannis Vasiliadis	April 11, 1990	August 8, 1991	New Democracy
Theodoros Anagnostopoulos	August 8, 1991	December 3, 1992	New Democracy
Nikolaos Gelestathis	December 3, 1992	September 14, 1993	New Democracy
Dimitrios Manikas (as Acting Minister)	September 14, 1993	October 13, 1993	
Stelios Papathemelis	October 13, 1993	April 4, 1995	PASOK
Sifis Valirakis	April 4, 1995	January 22, 1996	PASOK
Kostas Geitonas	January 22, 1996	August 30, 1996	PASOK
Konstantinos Beis	August 30, 1996	September 25, 1996	PASOK
Georgios Romeos	September 25, 1996	October 30, 1998	PASOK
Philippos Petsalnikos	October 30, 1998	February 19, 1999	PASOK
Michalis Chrisochoidis	February 19, 1999	March 10, 2004	PASOK
Georgios Voulgarakis	March 10, 2004	February 15, 2006	New Democracy
Vyron Polydoras	February 15, 2006	September 19, 2007	New Democracy

=== Citizen protection (2009–2012) ===
Name	Took office	Left office	Party
Michalis Chrisochoidis	7 October 2009	7 September 2010	PASOK
Christos Papoutsis	7 September 2010	7 March 2012	PASOK
Michalis Chrisochoidis	7 March 2012	17 May 2012	PASOK
Eleftherios Oikonomou	17 May 2012	21 June 2012	Caretaker government

=== Public order and citizen protection (2012–2015) ===
Name	Took office	Left office	Party
Nikos Dendias	21 June 2012	10 June 2014	New Democracy
Vassilis Kikilias	10 June 2014	27 January 2015	New Democracy

=== Public order and citizen protection (alternates, 2015–2018) ===
Name	Took office	Left office	Party
Giannis Panousis	27 January 2015	27 August 2015	Syriza
Antonis Makrodimitris	28 August 2015	21 September 2015	Caretaker government
Nikos Toskas	23 September 2015	3 August 2018	Syriza

=== Citizen protection (since 2018) ===
Name	Took office	Left office	Party
Olga Gerovasili	29 August 2018	9 July 2019	Syriza
Michalis Chrisochoidis	9 July 2019	31 August 2021	Independent (supported by New Democracy)
Takis Theodorikakos	31 August 2021	26 May 2023	New Democracy
Charalampos Lalousis	26 May 2023	27 June 2023	Caretaker government
Notis Mitarachi	27 June 2023	28 July 2023	New Democracy
Giannis Oikonomou	28 July 2023	4 January 2024	New Democracy
Michalis Chrisochoidis	4 January 2024	incumbent	New Democracy
