= 2004 PASOK leadership election =

← 1996	8 February 2004	2007 →
- Turnout: 1.020.145
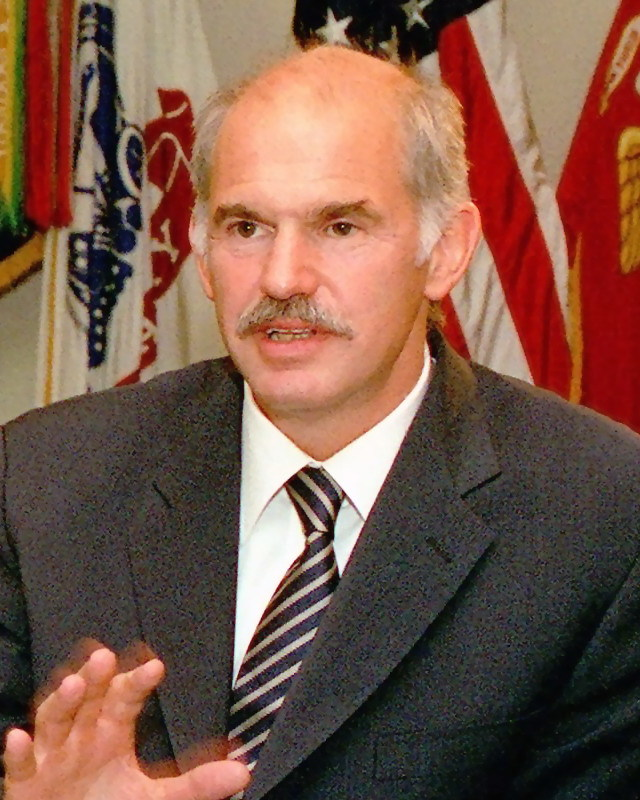
Candidate	George Papandreou
Popular vote	1.017.085
Percentage	100%
Elected	Unopposed
President of PASOK before election
Kostas Simitis
Elected President of PASOK
George Papandreou

The 2004 PASOK leadership election took place on 8 February 2004. Only one candidate stood for the presidency, George Papandreou, who received 99,70% of the vote. 1,020,145 members and friends of the Party participated in the elections, a record still unbroken for internal party elections in Greece.

== Background ==
On 17 January 1996, Andreas Papandreou resigned as prime minister. Subsequently, the PASOK Central Committee, on the recommendation of Kostas Skandalidis, decided on the procedures for the election of the Prime Minister by the party's parliamentary group. The next day, the parliamentary group chose among Kostas Simitis, Akis Tsochatzopoulos, Gerasimos Arsenis and Ioannis Charalambopoulos, for Kostas Simitis to be the new prime minister of Greece, and he took the oath of office on 22 January. On 23 June, Andreas Papandreou passed away.

A week later, the 4th congress was held in a tense atmosphere, where Simitis again faced Tsochatzopoulos, and while Simitis himself declared that he would resign as prime minister if he did not win, Tsochatzopoulos' supporters backed the notion of "diarchy" (i.e. Simitis remaining prime minister even if he lost the elections for the leadership of PASOK).

In the end, Simitis won over Tsochatzopoulos, 53.77%, against 46.23%, 2,732 votes, against 2,324 votes, with 17 invalid and 28 blank votes.

On 23 August of the same year, Simitis visited the President of the Republic, Konstantinos Stephanopoulos and asked him to dissolve parliament, which was granted, and elections were called for 22 September 1996. In these elections, PASOK received 41.49% of the votes and elected 162 MPs, forming a majority government. The next elections for the leadership of PASOK were held at the 5th congress in March 1999, where there was no change in leadership. In January 2004, Kostas Simitis resigned as leader of PASOK and the only candidate for the post was Andreas Papandreou's son, George.

== Following developments ==
After the electoral defeat in 2004, the 7th Congress of PASOK was held in March 2005, with the aim of reconstructing the party, updating the statutes and electing new organs. Secretary of the National Council, as the Central Committee was renamed, was Mariliza Xenogiannakopoulou. PASOK began a process of reorganising the party at all levels and adapting its organisational structure with emphasis on citizen participation, decentralisation and the use of new technologies. In 2006 Papandreou proceeded to restructure the party's organisational structure. In this context, Nikos Athanasakis was appointed secretary of the National Council.

In May 2007, a "Planning" Congress was organised in order to define and specify the party's programme. However, in the snap elections held on 16 September 2007, the movement failed to win. In the elections it received 38.1% of the votes and 102 seats. After the negative result, Papandreou asked for a renewal of confidence in him. Evangelos Venizelos announced his candidacy for the post of president on the same day of the elections. Another candidate in the party's leadership election, held on 11 November, was Kostas Skandalidis. George Papandreou was re-elected with 55% of the vote against 38% for Venizelos.
