= 2012 PASOK leadership election =

- 18 March 2012
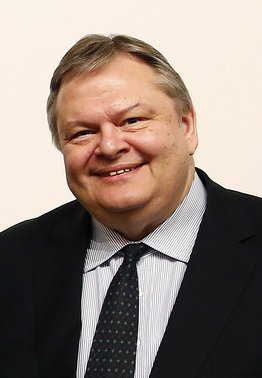
Candidate	E. Venizelos
Popular vote	Unopposed
Percentage	100%
Previous President of PASOK
George Papandreou
President of PASOK
Evangelos Venizelos

A leadership election was held on 18 March 2012 in the Panhellenic Socialist Movement (PASOK), Greece's main centre-left party. The leadership election came after the resignation of PM George Papandreou on 11 November 2011 as part of the Greek government debt crisis and before the early election expected in April or May 2012. Due to strongly rising resistance against the two main parties (PASOK and New Democracy, the main conservative party), PASOK's ratings in opinion polls were at an unprecedented all-time low point, barely above 10%.

Christos Papoutsis (Minister of Citizen Protection in Lucas Papademos' technical government until his resignation on 7 March 2012) and Evangelos Venizelos (Minister of Finance in the technical government) were initially running for party leadership. Venizelos was unexpectedly being supported by Minister of Health and Social Solidarity Andreas Loverdos, who had been widely considered to be one of the frontrunners for the post.

However, as Papoutsis failed to collect the necessary signatures to stand in the election, Venizelos was elected unopposed at the party convention. He resigned as finance minister on 19 March 2012 and was replaced by Philippos Sachinidis on 21 March 2012.
