= 2015 PASOK leadership election =

Greek political party leadership election

- 14 June 2015
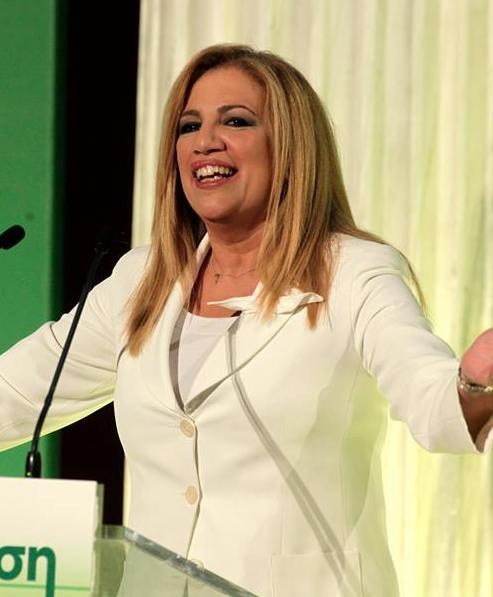

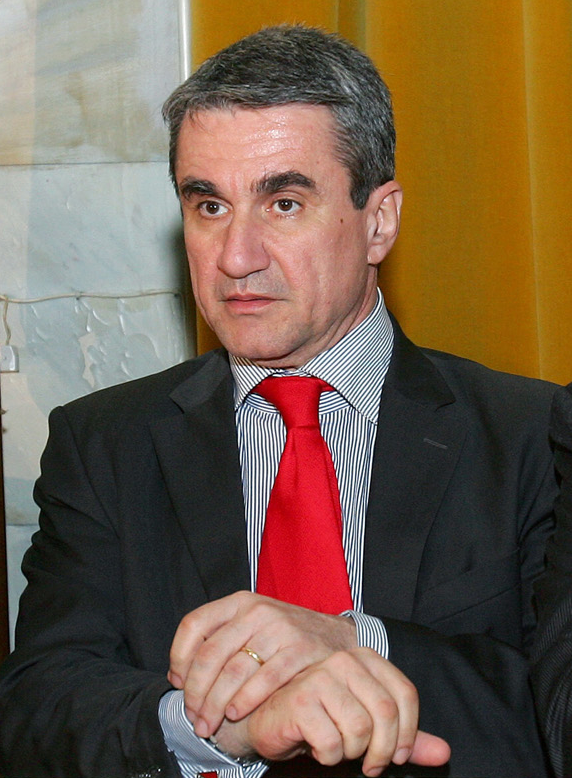

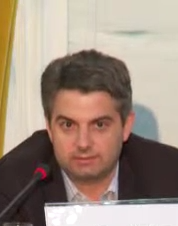
Candidate	F. Gennimata	A. Loverdos	O. Konstantinopoulos
Popular vote	26,868	13,241	11,870
Percentage	51.28%	25.27%	22.65%
Previous President of PASOK
Evangelos Venizelos
President of PASOK
Fofi Gennimata

A leadership election was held on 14 June 2015 in the Panhellenic Socialist Movement (PASOK). The leadership election took place after the 10th Congress of the Party, after PASOK's record low voteshare in the January 2015 Greek legislative election.

Candidates included Andreas Loverdos, Odysseas Konstantinopoulos and Fofi Gennimata, who ultimately came on top.

== History ==
Due to the record low election results in the January 2015 elections and the electoral and parliamentary shrinking of PASOK, the party's internal organs began preparing for a Congress.

The 10th Congress of PASOK began on June 5 and lasted three days. The Congress decided on the shifting of PASOK to a party of the broader Centre-Left and the election of a new president by all party members on June 14. Finally, the new members of the Central Political Committee were elected.

== Subsequent events ==
On August 31, 2015, Fofi Gennimata and the president of the Democratic Left Thanasis Theocharopoulos, announced an electoral coalition between the two parties in the following elections, under the name Democratic Alignment. Finally, the coalition of parties increased its percentages compared to the January election, receiving 6.28% and 17 seats, against 4.68% (13 seats) and 0.48% (no seats) for PASOK and DIMAR, respectively. One of the seats was occupied by Thanasis Theocharopoulos, while the remaining 16 were occupied by PASOK.

== Results ==
Summary of the June 14, 2015 Panhellenic Socialist Movement leadership election results
Candidate	Votes	%
Fofi Gennimata	26,868	51.28
Andreas Loverdos	13,241	25.27
Odysseas Konstantinopoulos	11,870	22.65
Valid votes	51,979	
Invalid votes	139	
Blank votes	270	
Total votes	52,388	100
Source: Official results as published in pasok.gr
