= Georgios Gennimatas =

Greek politician (1939–1994)

- Γεώργιος Γεννηματάς
- Born: 30 June 1939; Plaka, Athens, Kingdom of Greece
- Died: 25 April 1994 (aged 54); Evangelismos Hospital, Athens, Greece
- Resting place: First Cemetery of Athens
- Citizenship: Greece
- Education: National Technical University of Athens
- Occupation: Politician
- Political party: PASOK
- Spouse: Kakia Vergou (m. 1964; died 1993)
- Children: 2, including Fofi

Georgios Gennimatas (Greek: Γεώργιος Γεννηματάς; 30 June 1939 – 25 April 1994) was a Greek politician and founding member of the Panhellenic Socialist Movement (PASOK). He studied civil engineering at the National Technical University of Athens. He occupied several cabinet posts in the PASOK governments under Andreas Papandreou, serving as Minister of Interior (1981–1984), Welfare and Social Insurance (1984–1987), Labour (1987–1989) and National Economy (1989, 1993–1994). He is most notable for his official recognition of the left-wing fighters of the Greek Resistance during World War II and his healthcare and welfare reforms which established the National Health System (Εθνικό Σύστημα Υγείας) of Greece. His daughter Fofi Gennimata was also a PASOK politician.

Georgios Gennimatas was born on 30 June 1939, in the Plaka neighbourhood of Athens. Gennimatas married Catherine "Kakia" Vergou (1940–1993) in 1964, and they had two daughters, Fofi (1964–2021), and Mairi.

He was hospitalized due to a cold in January 1992, and a few days later he announced that he was diagnosed with lung cancer. He moved to New York City to underwent surgery at a hospital on 2 May 1992, while at the same time his wife, Kakia, was treated in Athens for breast cancer. He returned to Greece a short time later, but in September 1993 he underwent treatment at a hospital in Houston. He returned to Greece on 13 September 1993. His wife, Kakia, died of breast cancer in Athens two days later, on 15 September 1993, at age 53.

He was transferred to Evangelismos Hospital with respiratory complications on 19 April 1994, and he fell into a coma the next days. He died on 25 April 1994, at age 54. He was buried at the First Cemetery of Athens on 26 April 1994. After his death, to honor him, many hospitals in Greece were named after him, the most famous being the Athens General State Hospital "Georgios Gennimatas".

== Sources ==
- Maria Dede (25 April 2005). Γιώργος Γεννηματάς (in Greek). Eleftherotypia. Archived from the original on 18 September 2008.
- Christina Korai (26 June 1996). ΠΑΣΟΚ: Οι μεγάλες απώλειες (in Greek). Eleftherotypia. Archived from the original on 13 October 2011.
- Το πολιτικό όραμα (in Greek). Eleftherotypia. 8 November 2008.
- Στάση ζωής, η πολιτική (in Greek). Eleftherotypia. 25 April 2005.
