= 2007 PASOK leadership election =

- 11 November 2007
- Turnout: 78.9%
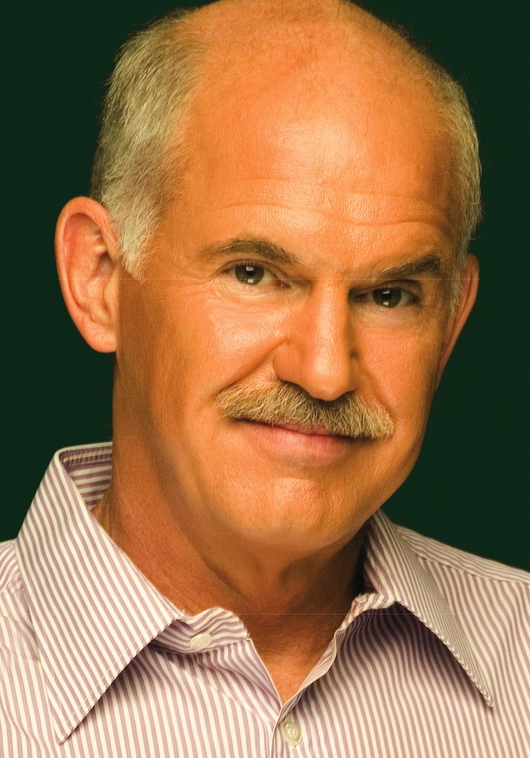

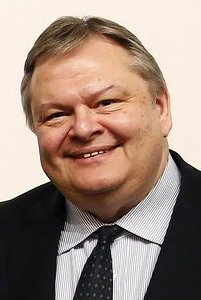

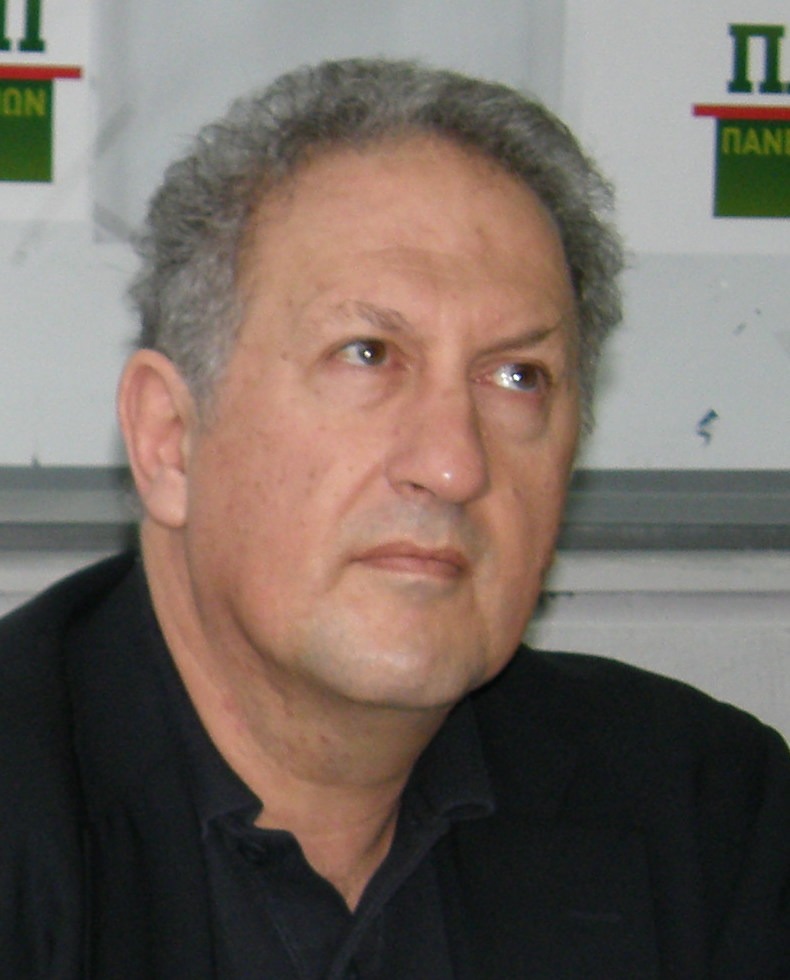
Candidate	G. Papandreou	E. Venizelos	K. Skandalidis
Popular vote	427,021	291,593	43,848
Percentage	55.91%	38.18%	5.74%
Previous President of PASOK
George Papandreou
President of PASOK
George Papandreou

A leadership election was held on November 11, 2007 in the Panhellenic Socialist Movement (PASOK), Greece's main centre-left party, after it was defeated in the parliamentary election earlier that year. The incumbent, George Papandreou, had stated right after the general elections that he would ask party members to renew their confidence in him, while Evangelos Venizelos and Kostas Skandalidis also declared themselves candidates.

Election districts were open from 9:00AM until 8:00PM local time In some districts the process finished at 9:30AM due to large number of people willing to vote. Voting it was scheduled to take place in 1,405 polling stations throughout the country and 86 in other countries and after merging some small stations it took place in 1,376. The procedure was fully electronically and was supported by 3,310 computers handled by 3,900 personnel. The registered voters are 347,991 members and 626,675 people in the status of the "friend of the party". The total number of voters, members and friends of the Movement older than 16 years old, was more than 700,000.

Initial results on the day of the election showed Papandreou winning a majority. At 10:00PM Skandalidis called Papandreou to congratulate him on his victory and some minutes later Venizelos did the same.

According to official final results, announced on November 14, George Papandreou was the victor with 55.91%, followed by Evangelos Venizelos with 38.18% and Kostas Skandalidis with 5.74%. Exit polls had published similar results.

== Background ==
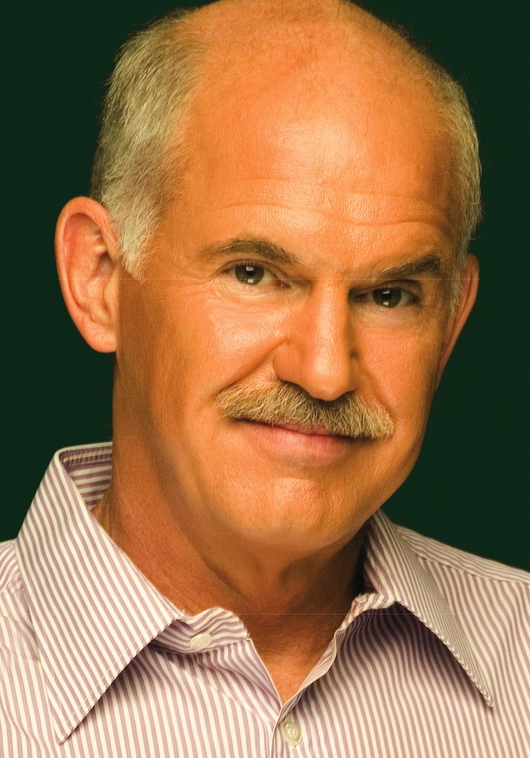
George Papandreou reelected leader.

A few hours after the results of the parliamentary elections were announced, on the night of Sunday, September 16, 2007, the leader of the defeated opposition party, George Papandreou, conceded defeat and made an announcement at PASOK's press-conference room in the Harilaos Trikoupis street building that houses the party HQ, asking all members of his party to find their own responsibilities for the defeat. He also declared that he would assume the part of the responsibility that belongs to him, by requesting the reaffirmation of his leadership by his fellow party members.

Shortly after, the winner of the elections Kostas Karamanlis gave the first post-election press conference of the winning party, New Democracy, in the Zappeion hall, declaring victory. Traditionally, the Zappeion hall houses all serious political announcements in Greece.

A few minutes later, in a surprising and semantic move, Evangelos Venizelos visited the Zappeion as well, and made an announcement where he thanked all PASOK voters and party members for their effort, and stated that "it is a pity that PASOK lost, while being able and obliged to win for the benefit of the country.". He asked for party unity, and declared that PASOK "deserves a better future and the replacement of the current false balance of power between the two parties". He thanked George Papandreou for assuming his part of the responsibility, and declared himself "obviously present" in the coming leadership election of his party.

On Monday, 17 September, Venizelos had a meeting with the former PASOK leader and ex-Prime Minister of Greece, Costas Simitis, whom he characterized as the "guarantor of unity and democratic and transparent processes" in his party, while he affirmed that his initiatives are not personal. Simitis, in a carefully written statement, admitted a "painful defeat", prioritized party unity and supported the immediate leadership election procedures as the only means for restoration and long-term crisis avoidance in PASOK.

Ηigh ranking PASOK officials Andreas Loverdos, Christos Verelis, George Floridis, George Lianis, Michalis Neonakis, Stavros Soumakis and Kimon Koulouris declared their support for Venizelos.

A survey was conducted by GPO for Mega channel on the very next day of the general elections regarding the suitability of each candidate for the party leadership. Evangelos Venizelos was regarded more suitable by 71.3% of the total sample, versus 15.8% for George Papandreou. While somewhat lower, the results were similar among PASOK voters (62.1% vs 25.7%). 70.6% considered that PASOK would achieve much better results with a different leader, while 61.2% consider that the most important factor for New Democracy's victory (among four options) was the personality of Kostas Karamanlis. Political analysts argue that the elections in Greece are becoming more of a character issue, rather than a party-orientation issue for the voters. However, 1 in 2 considered that Papandreou should still pursue the leadership, which was attributed to the necessity of selecting a better candidate among two, as opposed to Papandreou's previous election which had no opposition.

Several later surveys showed that the initial clear majority of Venizelos had diminished and that the election would be a close call between the two main candidates, while some of them even gave a slightly higher percentage to Papandreou.

Other potential candidates, according to Greek media, were ex-Ministers Michalis Chrisohoidis and Theodoros Pangalos as well as the former EU commissioner Anna Diamantopoulou. The latter announced on October 1 that she would not be a candidate, and Pangalos followed on October 7. On September 28, Kostas Skandalidis declared he would be the third candidate.

== Results ==
Summary of the November 11, 2007 Panhellenic Socialist Movement leadership election results
Candidate	Votes	%
George Papandreou	427,021	55.91
Evangelos Venizelos	291,593	38.18
Kostas Skandalidis	43,848	5.74
Valid votes	763,674	
Invalid votes	5,842	
Blank votes	1,212	
Total votes	769,156	100
Electorate	974,666^{1}	
Turnout		78.91
Source: Official results as published in pasok.gr; Notes:^{1}347,991 members and 626,675 people in the status of the "friend of the party".
