= Fofi Gennimata =

Greek politician (1964–2021)

- Φώφη Γεννηματά
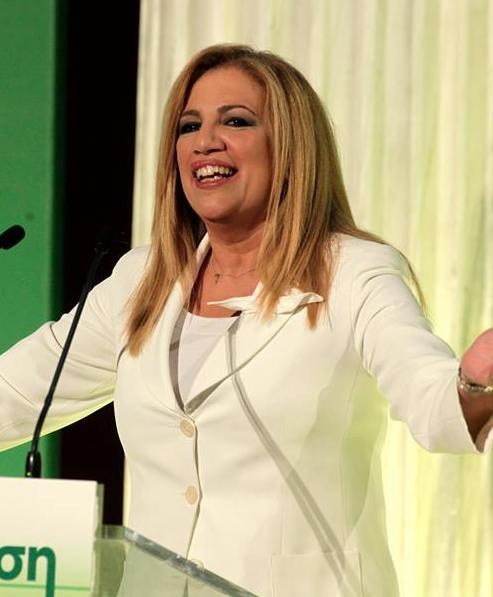
- Gennimata in 2015

President of the Movement for Change
- In office 19 November 2017 – 25 October 2021
- Preceded by: Position established
- Succeeded by: Nikos Androulakis

President of the Panhellenic Socialist Movement
- In office 14 June 2015 – 25 October 2021
- Preceded by: Evangelos Venizelos
- Succeeded by: Nikos Androulakis

Member of the Hellenic Parliament
- In office 25 January 2015 – 25 October 2021
- Constituency: Athens B (2015 – 2019); Athens B3 (South) (2019 – 2021)
- In office 6 May 2012 – 19 May 2012
- Constituency: State list
- In office 9 April 2000 – 31 December 2002
- Constituency: Athens A

Personal details
- Born: 17 November 1964 Ampelokipoi, Athens, Kingdom of Greece
- Died: 25 October 2021 (aged 56) Evangelismos Hospital, Athens, Greece
- Party: Panhellenic Socialist Movement
- Other political affiliations: Movement for Change
- Spouse: Alexandros Ntekas (divorced) Andreas Tsounis (m. 2003)
- Children: 3
- Parent: Georgios Gennimatas (father)
- Education: University of Athens
- Occupation: Politician; Political scientist
- Website: fofigennimata.gr

Fotini "Fofi" Gennimata (Greek: Φωτεινή "Φώφη" Γεννηματά [ˈfofi ʝenimaˈta]; 17 November 1964 – 25 October 2021) was a Greek politician who served as president of the Panhellenic Socialist Movement (PASOK) from 2015 to 2021. During her tenure as party leader, she also co-founded and led the Democratic Alignment and the Movement for Change, two successive political alliances of centre-left parties formed around PASOK. She was the daughter of Georgios Gennimatas, a high-profile government minister during the PASOK administrations of the 1980s and 1990s.

Gennimata served as a minister in the Cabinet of George Papandreou between 2009 and 2011, first as Deputy Minister of Health and Welfare and later as Alternate Minister of Education, Lifelong Learning and Religious Affairs.

== Early life and education ==
Gennimata was born on 17 November 1964 in the Ampelokipoi neighbourhood of Athens, the daughter of PASOK politician Georgios Gennimatas. She graduated from the Department of Political Science and Public Administration at the University of Athens in 1987. When at university, she was a member of the socialist student union. Prior to her entry into a political career, she began working as a banker in 1986 for the National Bank of Greece.

== Political career ==
After the legislative elections of 2000, at the age of 36 Gennimata became a member of the Hellenic parliament for PASOK and representing the Athens A constituency, a position she held until she resigned in 2002 to run for local elections.

From 2001 to 2004, she served as a member of PASOK's Central Committee, and from 2003 to 2009 she was a member of the Executive Bureau and the Political Council of PASOK. In August 2002 she was named PASOK candidate in the 2002 local elections for the Super-Prefecture of Athens and Piraeus, elections she won in the second round with 56.3% of the votes. She was re-elected in the first round of the 2006 local elections with 43.4% of the votes. Her term was characterized by continuous clashes with the national government, reluctant to Gennimata's demands that the central administration decentralize more and give more responsibilities to local governments.

Few days before the 2007 legislative elections, Gennimata resigned as mayor to lead PASOK's regional candidacy, but the Supreme Court blocked this move as ruled that according to Article 57 of the Constitution of Greece, local government officials cannot stand for election as MPs until they have seen their term out. Between 2003 and 2007 she was also president of the Greek Union of Prefectures.

She was elected deputy again in the 2009 legislative election. In October 2009, newly elected Prime Minister George Papandreou appointed her Deputy Minister of Health and Welfare, office she held until September 2010. From September 2010 to November 2011, she served as an Alternate Minister of Education, Lifelong Learning and Religious Affairs in the same cabinet. In 2011, PM Lucas Papademos named her Deputy Minister of the Interior. In 2012, Gennimata was appointed a spokesperson for PASOK thus resigned from her cabinet position.

She was also Deputy Minister of National Defence between June 2013 and January 2015.

=== Leader of PASOK (2015–2021) ===
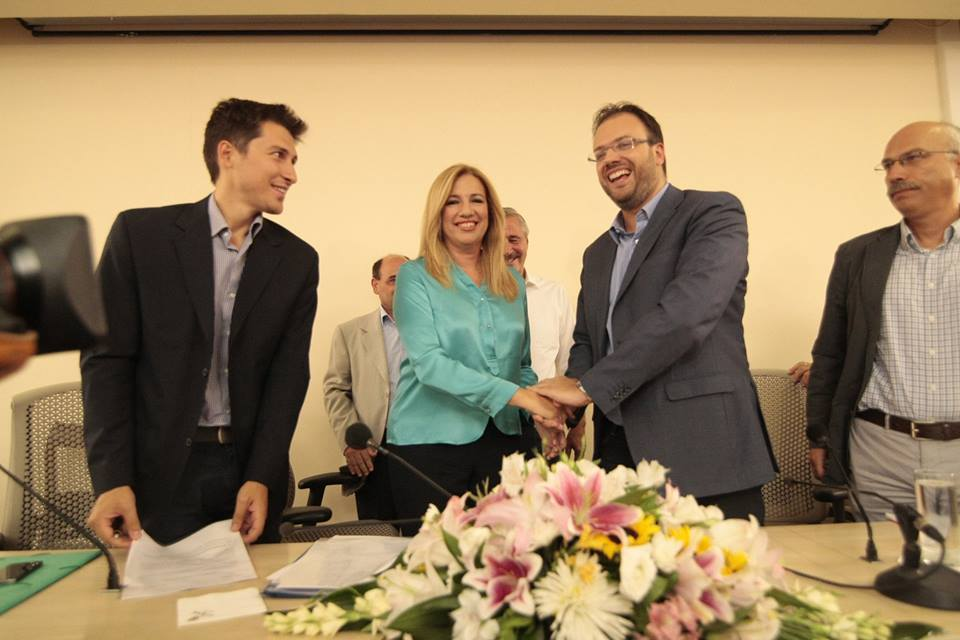
Gennimata in 2015

Gennimata was elected as Leader of the Panhellenic Socialist Movement at their tenth conference in 2015, after Evangelos Venizelos stepped down as leader a year before the conclusion of his term. She won the leadership election with 51% of the vote, beating Odysseas Konstantinopoulos and Andreas Loverdos.

On 30 August 2015, together with the chairman of DIMAR Thanasis Theocharopoulos she announced that both parties would unite in a single candidacy called Democratic Alignment (DISI) for the September 2015 snap election and she would be the one to lead it. The candidacy won 17 seats, 4 more than the seats PASOK won in the January election.

On 20 November 2017 Gennimata was elected as leader of Movement for Change with 56% of the vote, beating Nikos Androulakis. On 24 November 2017, she was re-elected as president of PASOK. In early 2021, Gennimata announced that she was seeking her re-election as leader of Movement for Change. On 12 October 2021, Gennimata was hospitalized for health reasons and announced her withdrawal from the party leadership.

== Personal life and death ==
Gennimata was the daughter of the prominent socialist minister Georgios Gennimatas and Kakia Vergou. Her mother, Kakia Vergou (1940–1993), was diagnosed with breast cancer in 1984. She died on 15 September 1993, at age 53. Her father, Georgios Gennimatas, was diagnosed with lung cancer in early 1992 and died on 25 April 1994, at age 54.

Gennimata married her first husband, Alexandros Ntekas, at the age of 22 with whom she had her elder daughter, Aimilia. She married her second husband, Andreas Tsounis, in 2003 with whom she had a daughter and a son.

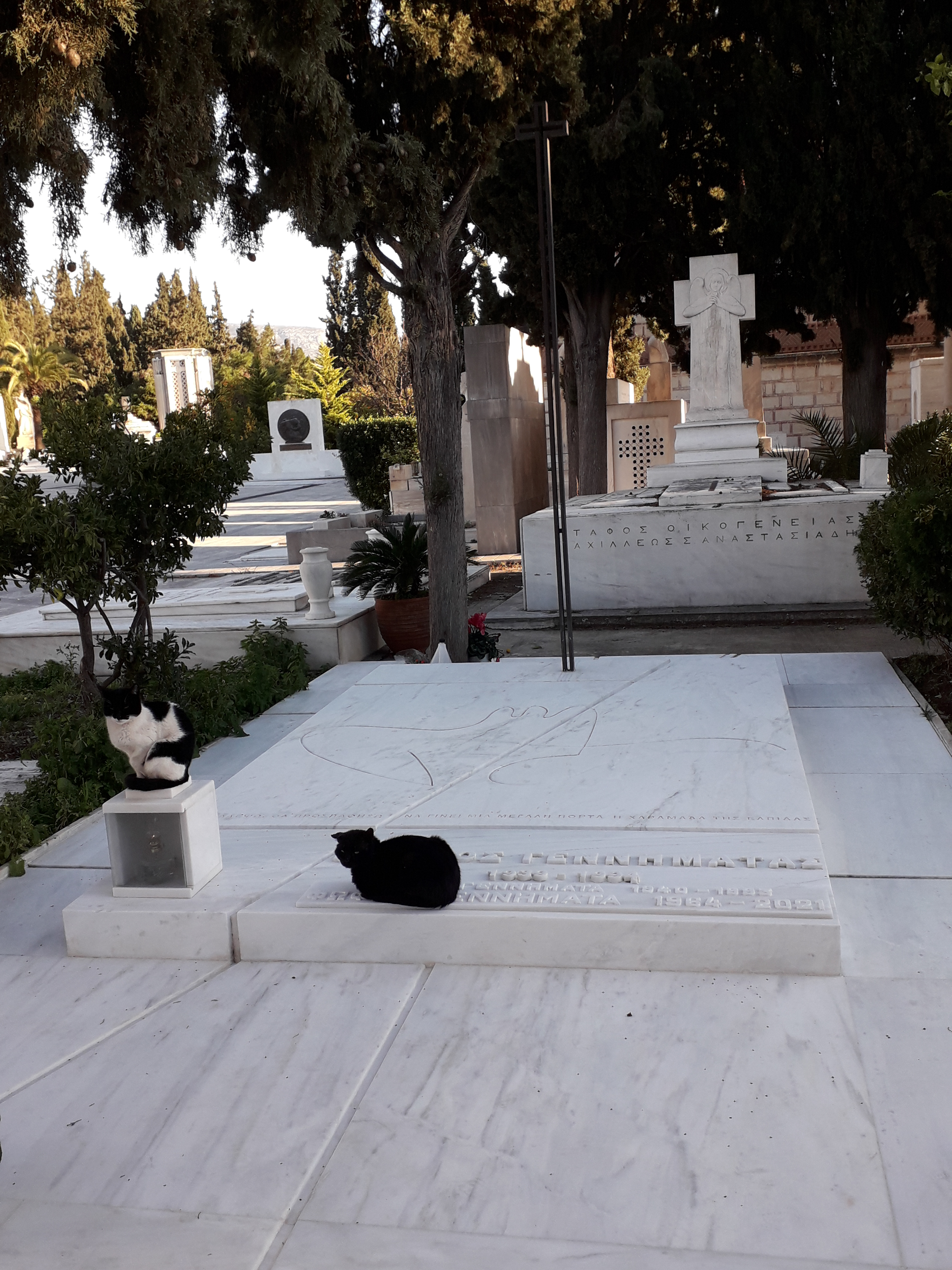
Gravestone of Fofi Gennimata and her father in at the First Cemetery of Athens

In 2008 Gennimata was diagnosed with metastatic breast cancer; she spoke openly about her health issues.

On 11 October 2021, she was admitted to Evangelismos Hospital with symptoms of partial ileus due to metastatic cancer. Although she was initially expected to be discharged, she developed severe complications over the following days, and her health started to decline. On 24 October 2021 she fell into a hepatic coma, and her condition proved irreversible. She died on 25 October 2021, at age 56.

The Greek parliament held a minute of silence and decided to suspend its sessions for one week to honor her. The Greek PM Kyriakos Mitsotakis declared a national day of mourning for 27 October 2021, the day Gennimata's funeral was held.

Gennimata's funeral was held on 27 October 2021 at the Metropolitan Cathedral of Athens; it was attended by Greek President Katerina Sakellaropoulou, Prime Minister Kyriakos Mitsotakis and Leader of the Opposition Alexis Tsipras.

Party political offices
Preceded by Evangelos Venizelos	President of the Panhellenic Socialist Movement; 2015–2021	Succeeded by Nikos Androulakis
