= Theodoros Pangalos (politician) =

Greek politician (1938–2023)

- Θεόδωρος Πάγκαλος
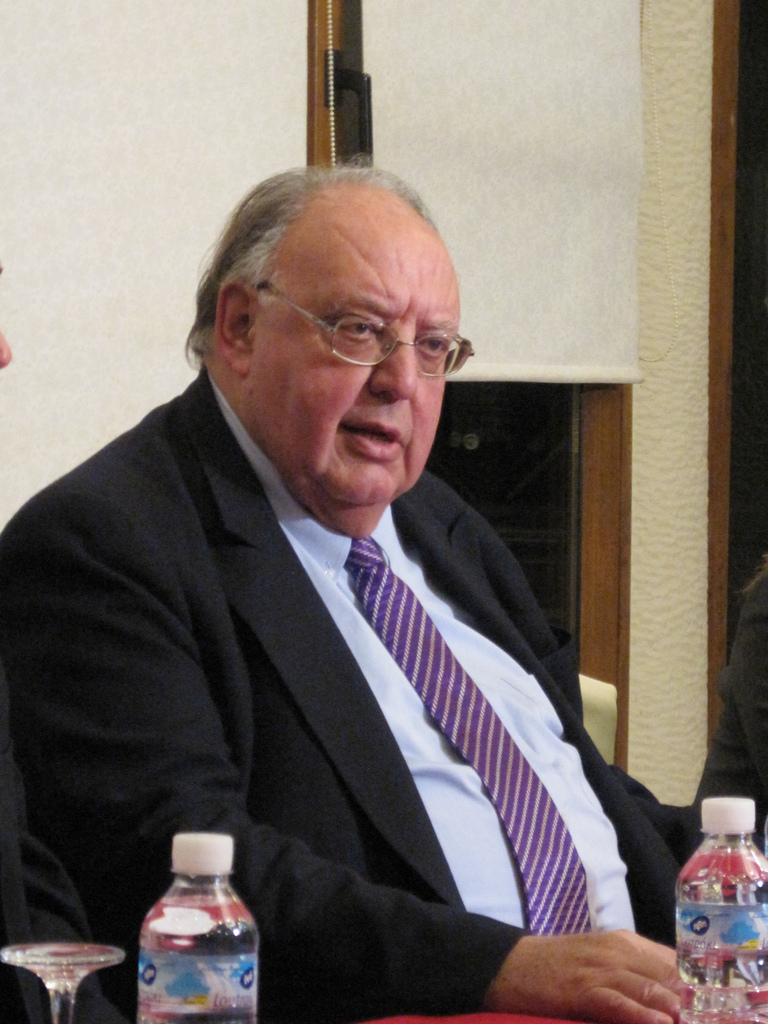
- Pangalos in 2010

Deputy Prime Minister of Greece
- In office 7 October 2009 – 17 May 2012 Serving with Evangelos Venizelos (2011‍–‍2012)
- Prime Minister: George Papandreou; Lucas Papademos
- Preceded by: Tzannis Tzannetakis (1993)
- Succeeded by: Evangelos Venizelos (2013)

Minister for Foreign Affairs
- In office 22 January 1996 – 18 February 1999
- Prime Minister: Costas Simitis
- Preceded by: Karolos Papoulias
- Succeeded by: George Papandreou

Alternate Minister of Foreign Affairs
- In office 13 October 1993 – 8 July 1994
- Prime Minister: Andreas Papandreou
- In office 5 June 1985 – 26 July 1985
- Prime Minister: Andreas Papandreou

Personal details
- Born: 17 August 1938 Eleusis, Greece
- Died: 31 May 2023 (aged 84) Athens, Greece
- Party: EDA (formerly); KKE (formerly); PASOK
- Spouse: Christina Christofakis
- Relations: Theodoros Pangalos (grandfather)
- Children: 5
- Website: pangalos.gr

Theodoros Pangalos (Greek: Θεόδωρος Πάγκαλος; 17 August 1938 – 31 May 2023) was a Greek politician and leading member of the Panhellenic Socialist Movement (PASOK). He served as the deputy prime minister of Greece, responsible for the coordination of the Government Council for Foreign Affairs and Defense (KYSEA) and the new Economic & Social Policy Committee from 2009 to 2012.

== Early life ==
Pangalos was born in Eleusis, Greece, on 17 August 1938. He was the grandson of General and 1926 dictator Theodoros Pangalos. Some of his ancestors were Arvanites.

Pangalos was member of the left-wing Lambrakis Youth and, in 1964, a candidate for the Hellenic Parliament with the United Democratic Left (EDA). Pangalos opposed the 1967 military dictatorship, and was deprived by the junta of his Greek citizenship in 1968.

== Political career ==
Pangalos became a member of the Communist Party of Greece (KKE), rising to its Central Committee, before eventually joining the PASOK socialist party during the Metapolitefsi. He was elected for the first time as an MP in the 1981 general election with PASOK and has been continuously re-elected since until 2012.

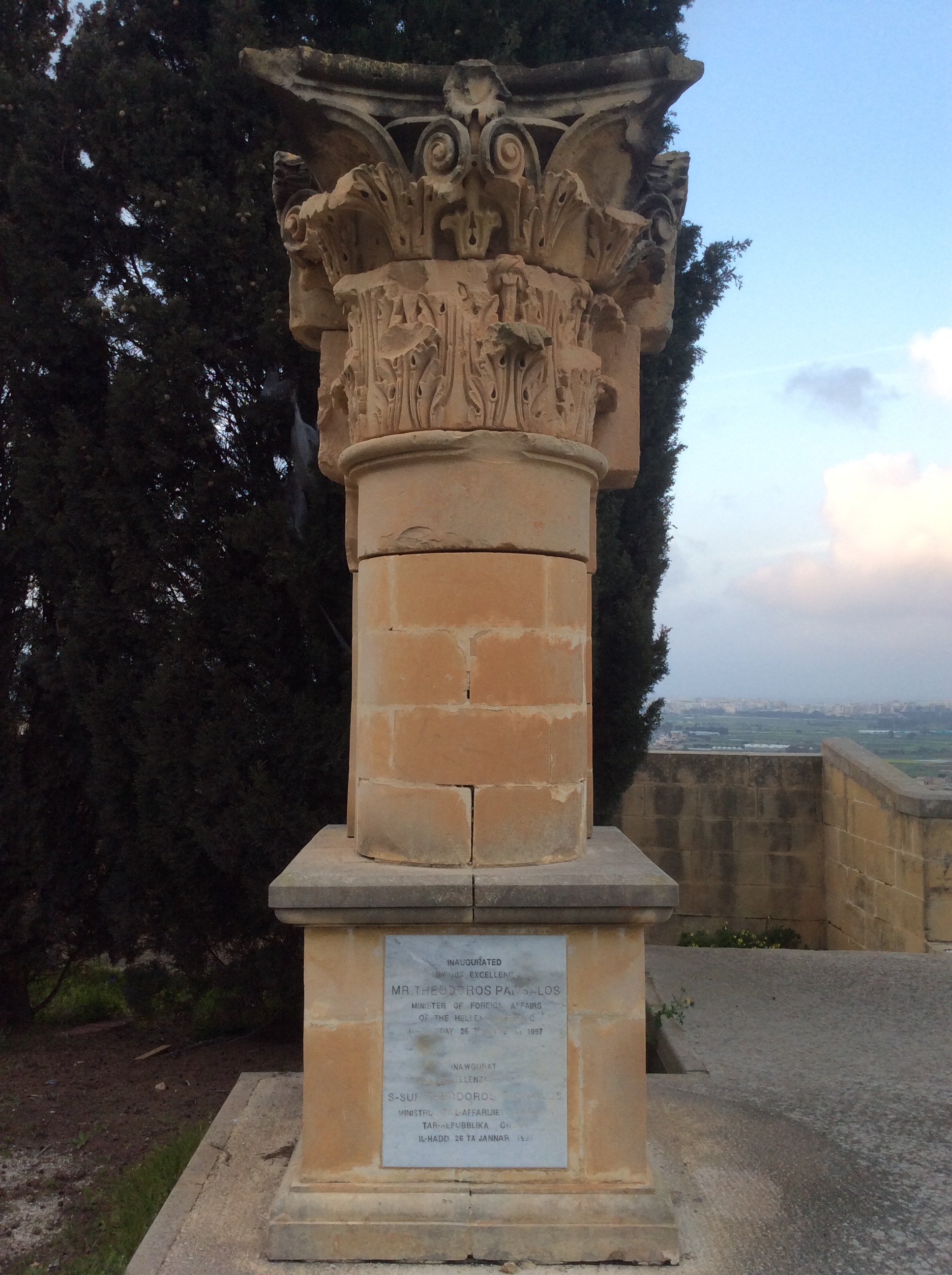
Monument at the MCAST campus in Mosta, Malta, which was inaugurated in 1999 during his ministry of foreign affairs

In 1996 he was appointed Minister for Foreign Affairs and held the post until his resignation in 1999, in the aftermath of the scandal involving the leader of PKK, recognized as a terrorist organization by EU, Abdullah Öcalan: helped by individual members of the Greek intelligence agencies Öcalan entered Greece illegally and was then deported to Kenya, where he was captured by Turkish agents after leaving the Greek embassy at Nairobi.

Pangalos came under fire when he said in 2018 on a radio show “The only good Turk is a dead Turk. I believe this because I have not come across a good Turk. They lack basic appreciation.”

Pangalos was briefly made Minister for Culture in 2000, an appointment which was widely criticized, in view of his previous statement that artists who had protested his handling of the Öcalan affair were kouradomanges (Greek: κουραδόμαγκες, "turd tough guys").

== Death ==
Pangalos died on 31 May 2023, at the age of 84. His remains were cremated on 2 June.

== Quotes ==
- "Mazi ta fagame" (Greek: μαζί τα φάγαμε) (lit. "“We all ate it together", meaning "we are all responsible for the debt").

== In popular culture ==
A Greek experimental pop band named Plastic Flowers sampled his famous speech "mazi ta fagame" in their song "Sinking Ship / Vanished Crew".

Political offices
Preceded by Karolos Papoulias	Minister for Foreign Affairs; 1996–1999	Succeeded by George Papandreou
Vacant Title last held by Tzannis Tzannetakis	Deputy Prime Minister of Greece; 2009–2012; Served alongside: Evangelos Venizelos (2011–2012)	Vacant Title next held by Evangelos Venizelos
