= Kostas Skandalidis =

Greek politician

Kostas Skandalidis MP
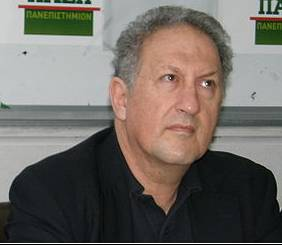

Member of the Hellenic Parliament for Athens A
- Incumbent
- Assumed office 1989

Minister for Rural Development and Food
- In office 9 September 2010 – 17 May 2012
- President: Karolos Papoulias
- Prime Minister: George Papandreou Lucas Papademos

Personal details
- Born: 11 January 1953 (age 73) Kos, Greece
- Party: Panhellenic Socialist Movement
- Education: National Technical University of Athens
- Profession: Politician

Kostas Skandalidis (Greek: Κώστας Σκανδαλίδης; born 11 January 1953) is a Greek politician and member of the Greek Parliament for the Panhellenic Socialist Movement (PASOK) for the Athens A constituency.

== Life ==
M.P. Kostas Skandalidis was born in 1953 in Kos, Greece. He is the son of the priest, Papa-Giorgis and Christina Skandalidi. He graduated from the National Technical University of Athens with a degree in electrical engineering. In 1974 he became a founding member of the PA.SO.K., and has since then elected as a member of the Hellenic Parliament in all general elections since 1989, initially for the Dodecanese and from 2000 in the Athens A constituency.

He was elected secretary of the Central Committee of the PA.SO.K. three times between 11 October 1995 and 22 October 2001.

M.P. Kostas Skandalidis was a candidate for the position of Mayor of Athens in the local elections of 2006, in which he received 28.84% and his platform became the major opposition.

After the legislative elections of 2007, in which the PA.SO.K. was defeated, M.P. Kostas Skandalidis announced his candidacy for the leadership of the party. In the leadership elections, which took place on 11 November 2007, he was placed third with 5.74% of the vote, behind incumbent party leader George Papandreou and Evangelos Venizelos.

He has held the following posts:

- Minister for the Aegean and Island Policy (13 October 1993 - 8 July 1994)
- Minister of Interior (8 July 1994 - 15 September 1995)
- Minister for the Interior and Public Order (24 October 2001 - 10 March 2004)
- Minister for Rural Development and Food (since 9 September 2010)

== See also ==
- PA.SO.K.
- Cabinet of Greece

| Preceded by Konstantinos Mitsotakis | Minister for the Aegean and Island Policy; 1993–1994 | Succeeded by Antonis Kotsakas |
| Preceded by Nikos Konstantopoulos | Minister for the Interior; 1994–1995 | Succeeded by Akis Tsochatzopoulos |
| Preceded by Vasso Papandreou | Minister for the Interior and Public Order; 2001–2004 | Succeeded by Nikos Alivizatos |
| Preceded by Katerina Batzeli | Minister for Rural Development and Food; 2010–2012 | Succeeded by Napoleon Maravegias |
