= PASOK =

Political party in Greece

Panhellenic Socialist Movement Πανελλήνιο Σοσιαλιστικό Κίνημα
- Abbreviation: PASOK; ΠΑΣΟΚ
- Founder: Andreas Papandreou
- Founded: 3 September 1974
- Dissolved: 29 March 2026
- Preceded by: Panhellenic Liberation Movement
- Merged into: PASOK – Movement for Change
- Headquarters: Chariláou Trikoúpi 50, 106 80 Athens
- Student wing: Panhellenic Combative Student Faction (ΠΑΣΠ) (universities' organization); Panhellenic Combative Student Movement (ΠΑΜΚ) (school organization; dormant)
- Youth wing: PASOK Youth
- Trade union wing: Panhellenic Trade Union Movement of Workers (ΠΑΣΚΕ)
- Ideology: Social democracy; Pro-Europeanism; Historical: Socialism; Greek nationalism; Left-wing populism; Republicanism; Euroscepticism; Anti-Turkish sentiment
- Political position: Centre-left; 1970s-early 1980s: Left-wing
- National affiliation: Olive Tree (2014); Democratic Alignment (2015–2018); Movement for Change (2018–2022); PASOK – Movement for Change (2022–2026)
- Regional affiliation: PSOM (1976–1992)
- European affiliation: Party of European Socialists
- European Parliament group: Progressive Alliance of Socialists and Democrats
- International affiliation: Progressive Alliance; Socialist International
- Colours: Dark green (Note: Since 2016); Green (Note: Before 2016)
- Slogan: "Society in the foreground"
- Anthem: O ílios o prásinos (The Green Sun)

Party flag
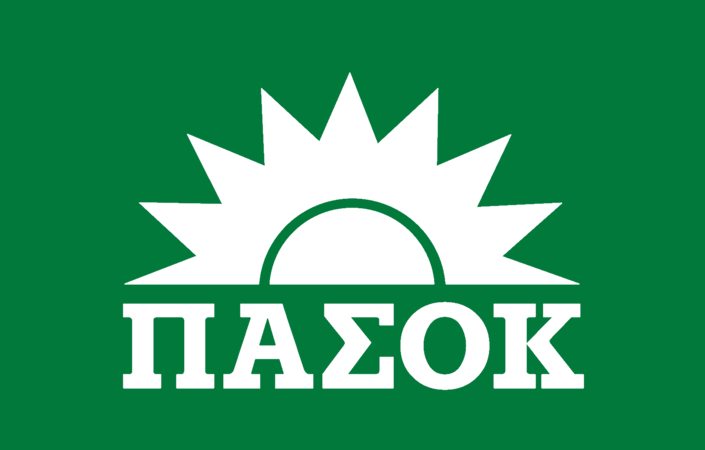

Website
- pasok.gr

The Panhellenic Socialist Movement, (Note: Greek: Πανελλήνιο Σοσιαλιστικό Κίνημα, romanized: Panellínio Sosialistikó Kínima, pronounced [paneˈlini.o sosi.alistiˈko ˈcinima]) known mostly by its acronym PASOK, (Note: /pəˈsɒk/; ΠΑΣΟΚ, pronounced [paˈsok]) was a social-democratic political party in Greece. Following the collapse of the Greek military dictatorship of 1967–1974, PASOK was founded on 3 September 1974 as a socialist party by Andreas Papandreou. The largest left-of-center party in Greece between 1977 and 2012, it was the dominant political party of the country from 1981 to 2004, under party founder Andreas Papandreou and Costas Simitis. After the Metapolitefsi and until 2012 it was one of the two major parties in the country, along with New Democracy, its main political rival.

Last elected to power in 2009, PASOK lost much of its popular support as a result of the Greek debt crisis. PASOK was the ruling party when the economic crisis began, and it negotiated the first Greek bailout package with the European troika, which necessitated harsh austerity measures. This caused a significant loss in the party's popularity. It was part of two coalition governments from 2011 to 2015, during which further austerity measures were taken in response to the crisis. Due to these measures and the crisis, PASOK went from being the largest party in the Hellenic Parliament with 160 seats (43.92% of the popular vote) in the 2009 election to being the smallest party with 13 seats (4.68% of the popular vote) in the January 2015 election. This decline became known as Pasokification.

To halt the party's decline, Fofi Gennimata was elected as the new president of the party and formed a political alliance known as the Democratic Alignment (DISY). In the September 2015 election, DISY was the fourth most voted-for party. In 2018, PASOK merged into a new political alliance of centre-left parties, again led by Gennimata, called the Movement for Change (KINAL), becoming the third largest party in the parliament in the 2019 election. After the death of Gennimata and the election of the new Party President Nikos Androulakis, PASOK (running under the new PASOK-KINAL umbrella) improved its electoral outcome, achieving a 11.84% share of the popular vote in the June 2023 election. In October 2024, Androulakis was re-elected as president of PASOK. After a decade of poor electoral outcomes, PASOK – Movement for Change has retained its position as one of the main Greek political parties, and became a unitary political party on 29 March 2026 after the merger of its component parties including PASOK and KIDISO.

Originally a broadly statist and Eurosceptic party of the newly demarginalised Greek left-wing, PASOK's politics have changed significantly. In the years following its ascension to power in the 1981 elections, it pursued a transformative social agenda of economic and social liberalisation in regards to labour rights, the political and social rift following the Greek Civil War (1946–1949), education, and individual rights. Under Papandreou, it began shifting towards pro-European Union and moderate policies, a shift that accelerated after Simitis succeeded the ailing Papandreou in 1996 and resulted in Greece completing the adoption of the euro as its currency in 2002. PASOK was often accused of populism and contributing to political polarisation, and especially after its rapid downfall, was associated with economic mismanagement, clientelism, and corruption. Many of its members crossed the floor to other parties and coalitions, mainly New Democracy and Syriza, prior to its return as the leading opposition party.

== History ==
=== Foundation and Early years ===
The first members of the party were the main organizers of the collapse of the Greek junta and the re-establishment of democracy on 3 September 1974. Its founder was Andreas Papandreou, son of the late Greek liberal leader and three-time Prime Minister of Greece Georgios Papandreou Sr, and its co-founder trade unionist Georgios Daskalakis. Its founding mottos were "National Independence, Popular Sovereignty, Social Emancipation, Democratic Process." Andreas Papandreou was offered the leadership of the liberal political forces - what evolved into Centre Union – New Forces - immediately after the restoration of democracy, but in a risky move he declined, so the leadership was assumed by Georgios Mavros. Papandreou, a powerful orator and charismatic leader, explicitly rejected the Venizelist ideological heritage of his father, and stressed the fact that he was a socialist, not a liberal.

At the November 1974 elections the Party received only 13.5% of the vote and won 15 seats (out of 300), coming third behind the centre-right New Democracy of Konstantinos Karamanlis and the Centre Union – New Forces (EK-ND) of Giorgos Mavros. That year, Sylva Akrita became the first woman elected to the Hellenic Parliament from the PASOK party in history.

In the November 1977 elections, however, PASOK eclipsed the EK-ND, winning 93 seats by doubling its share of the vote and becoming the main opposition party in Greece at the time.

=== First government ===
In the October 1981 national elections PASOK won a landslide victory with 48.1% of the vote, capturing 172 seats; it forming the first socialist government in Greece since 1924. Although Papandreou had campaigned for withdrawal of Greece from NATO and the European Economic Community, after a strong request by the rest of the party members and its supporters, changed his policies towards both organizations. He proved to be an excellent negotiator when it came to securing benefits and subsidies for Greece from the EEC. For example, in 1985 he openly threatened Jacques Delors to veto the entry of Spain and Portugal in to the ECC to secure more monetary aid for Greece. In the June 1985 elections, PASOK received 46% of the vote, winning 161 seats, thus securing a stable parliamentary majority for its second term in power.

=== Second government ===
It continued to be popular for much of its second term, especially in March 1987 when Andreas Papandreou successfully handled a crisis in the Aegean with Turkey. By late 1988 however, both the government's popularity and Papandreou's health had declined. The former, because of the press’ reports of financial and corruption scandals that, implicated Ministers and, allegedly, Andreas Papandreou himself as well as because of fiscal austerity measures imposed after the Keynesian policies of the first term. Under Papandreou, total government expenditure rose in 1982 by 6.8%, by 1.4% in 1983, by 5.5% in 1984, and by 11.0% in 1985. As a result of austerity measures introduced in October 1985, however, total government expenditure fell by 4.6% in 1986, and by 1.9% in 1987. The middle of 1987, however, saw Costas Simitis (the minister who presided over the austerity program) being dismissed and the austerity policies abandoned, with expansionary economic policies pursued once again.

=== 1989 elections ===
Despite this u-turn, PASOK lost the June 1989 elections with 40% of the vote while the opposing New Democracy received 44.3%. PASOK had changed the electoral law before the elections, making it harder for the leading party to form a majority government, so the legislature was deadlocked.

Another election in November produced a very similar result. After a brief period of a grand coalition government, in which PASOK participated, a third election in April 1990 brought New Democracy back to power. Despite a 7% lead in popular vote over PASOK, New Democracy could only secure a marginal majority in the Hellenic Parliament, electing 152 MPs out of a total of 300; PASOK had secured a larger number of representatives on a lower percentage of votes, as well as having a small overall lead, in the elections of 1985, under the previous electoral system. Its representation in the Parliament shrunk to 121 MPs in 1990. In opposition, PASOK underwent a leadership crisis when Andreas Papandreou was prosecuted over his supposed involvement in the Koskotas scandal.

=== Third government ===
He was eventually acquitted and, in a dramatic twist of fate, in the October 1993 elections led the party to another landslide victory. Papandreou returned to office with 47% of the vote and his re-election was considered by many a vote of confidence of the public against his prosecution. In November 1995, however, Papandreou's health began to deteriorate and the party was racked with leadership conflicts.

=== Social Reforms ===
During his time in office, Papandreou presided over a wide range of social reforms. His governments carried through sweeping reforms of social policy by introducing a welfare state, significantly expanding welfare measures, expanding health care coverage (the "National Health System" was instituted, which made modern medical procedures available in rural areas for the first time,) promoting state-subsidized tourism (social tourism) for lower-income families, and index-linking pensions.

A number of other reforms were carried out in areas such as trade union rights, shop closing and reopening times, social security, education, health and safety, and work councils. A more progressive taxation scheme was introduced and budgetary support for artistic and cultural programmes was increased. Social aid became available to deaf and dumb adults as well as for persons with mental disabilities, minimum pensions were indexed to the minimum wage, a social assistance pension for those aged 68 and over was introduced, and (as noted by one study) "All uninsured employed and self-employed individuals are covered by IKA (social insurance fund)." Social security benefits were also adjusted to price increases, while social assistance disability benefits were extended to new categories. Special family allowances were established for certain groups. Wages and pensions became automatically adjusted in line with the consumer price index every 4 months on the basis of economic forecasts. In addition, all women with unmarried children under 21 could retire at 55, early retirement was extended to more occupations, and low-income households received housing allowances. New rights to parental leave were also enshrined in law, while a 1985 law provided for a postpartum allowance for OGA-insured workers. In addition, tax relief was introduced for certain groups of mothers, such as working unwed mothers. The role of OAED in vocational guidance and training was strengthened, while subsidies for returning Greek migrants were introduced. Saturday working was also abolished for certain categories of workers. Various improvements in the coverage and adequacy of various kinds of pensions were also carried out, and a law was passed that established a scheme providing farmers with supplementary coverage. During PASOK’s first 4 years in office, expenditure on pensions and social welfare increased by almost 50.%

Various reforms were carried out in education, such as the abolition of entry examinations for upper secondary education, a 3-year long post-secondary tier of vocational training, the introduction of teacher training colleges, the building of new universities, the introduction of the notion of ‘special needs,’ the modernization of university curricula, and the introduction of new procedures for selecting and promoting faculty which involved greater participation by students. Higher education was also made available on equal terms to all Greek citizens. New rights for women were also introduced, amongst which included the abolition of the dowry system, the legalization of civil marriage, the decriminalization of adultery for women, and the granting to female farmers their own pension together with the ability to receive (in their own name) loans from the Agricultural Bank. In addition, a New Family Code was established, which declared that wives and husbands were equal partners in their marriages. A law was also passed enabling women to acquire experience in cooperatives. In addition, agricultural policies of subsidization, cooperatives and price supports were also carried out that improved the overall positions of farmers.

A law of 1984 extended the protection accorded (as noted by one study) “to victims of acts of racial discrimination to include the area of religion,” while under another law passed that same year the automatic loss of nationality for married women was brought to an end. In 1986, the PASOK government amended the Greek constitution to remove most powers from the president and giving wider authority to the prime minister and the Executive Government. However, the dubious methods by Papandreou triggered a constitutional crisis that ended after the elections of 1985. Civil marriages, not consecrated by religious ceremony, were recognized as equally valid with religious weddings. The left-wing Resistance movement against the Axis in World War II was finally formally recognized, and former leftist resistance fighters were given state pensions, while leftist political refugees of the Greek Civil War were finally given permission to return to Greece. Various repressive laws of the anti-communist postwar establishment were abolished, wages were boosted, an independent and multidimensional foreign policy was pursued, and the Greek Gendarmerie military police force abolished in 1984.

Further social measures were carried out during Papandreou’s last premiership. In 1993, tax incentives for families were extended. Under Law 2362/95, the tax exemption where a property is transferred to children or inherited by them was increased, while a 1994 law provided consumer associations with the right (as noted by one study) “to bring class actions against producers accused of use of unfair terms or provision of inadequate services to consumers.” Increases in minimum pensions and family benefits were also carried out, together with measures to improve the implementation of ALMPs. In 1994, a provision under which employers could automatically dismiss workers involved in illegal strikes was eliminated. That same year, a new fund to combat unemployment was set up.

Law no. 2224 introduced a number of changes concerning social security and worker’s rights. Modifications were introduced by decree to the legislation on trade unions and on employee health and safety which was said to enable Greek society (as noted by one study) “to form a clear and complete picture of the prevailing legislation, improving relations between workers and employers and facilitating supervision of the legislation in question by the responsible public authorities.” The law regulated problems in the field of the building of workers' housing (such as debt repayment) and also included a procedure by which (as noted by one study) “shop opening hours can be regulated and includes provisions for electoral proceedings for: the union representation of mariners and a special pay system for waiters and waitresses.” The law also ratified collective labour agreements providing for an extension of the overall duration of maternity leave to 18 weeks.

Law no. 2224 also provided for (as noted by one study) “equal treatment between Greek nationals and nationals of other Contracting parties lawfully resident or regularly working in Greece in respect of access to vocational training organized by the OAED” together with (as noted by another study) “equal treatment regarding all types of training allowances.” The same law also increased unemployment benefits (which hadn’t been changed since the end of 1989) by 30%, and set (as a standard) the minimum level of unemployment benefits at 66.6%. Despite this, the unemployment benefit’s minimum, basic amount represented less than 50% of the minimum daily wage of an unskilled worker by the end of 2001. The law also received criticism from unions due to the legislation also mandating skeleton staffs during strikes disrupting social needs; the criticism being that the law’s provisions on “social needs” were vague.

According to one estimate, the percentage of the population living poverty fell steadily during PASOK's time in office from 1981 to 1989 and from 1993 to 1996.

=== Modernization period under the leadership of Costas Simitis ===
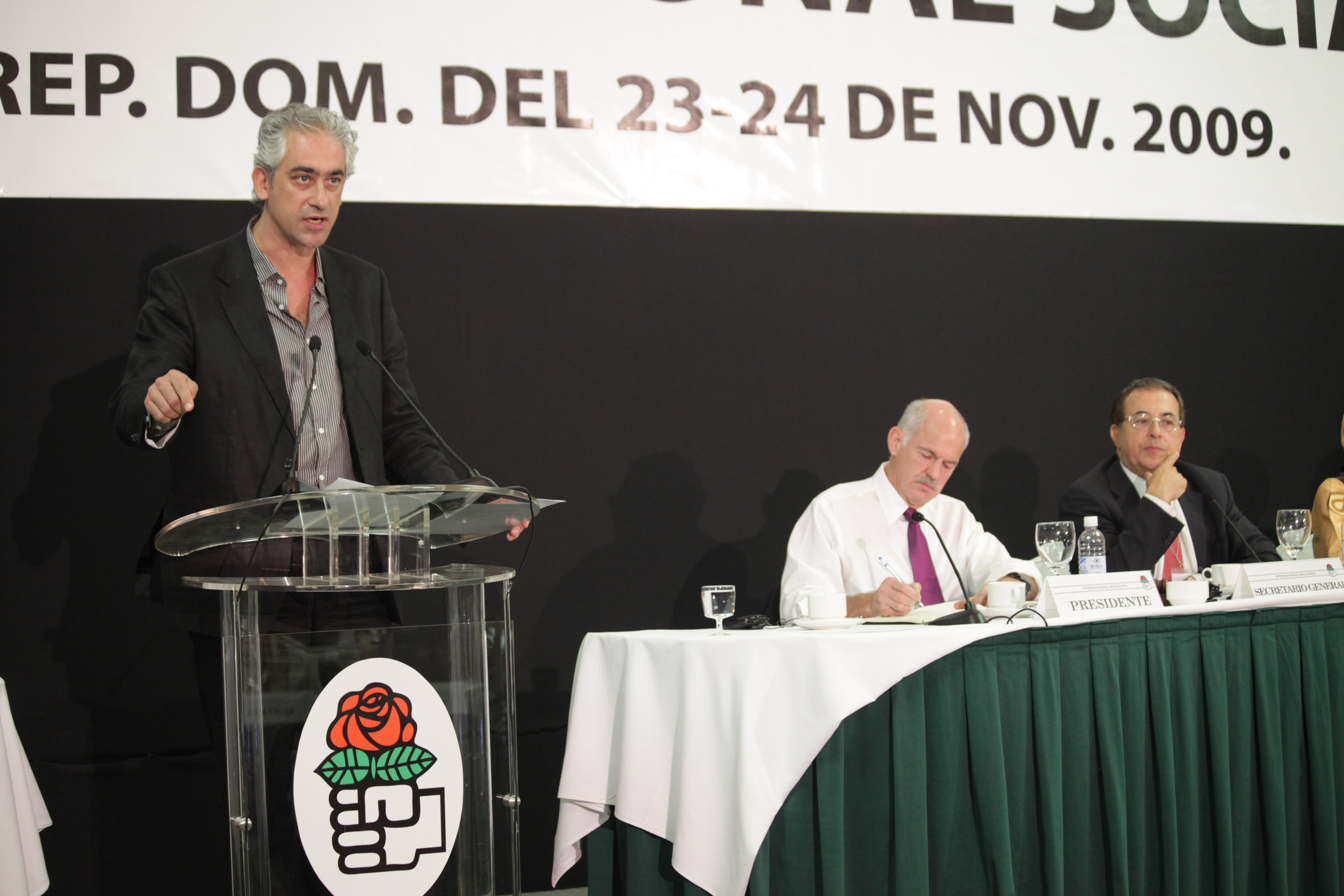
Deputy Foreign Minister of Greece in the Socialist International conference

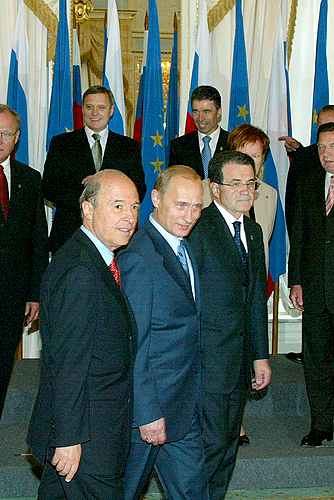
Costas Simitis with Russian President Vladimir Putin and European Commission President Romano Prodi

In January 1996 Andreas Papandreou retired after a protracted three-month-long hospitalization, during which he retained the role of Prime Minister; he died six months later. He was succeeded by Costas Simitis, the candidate of the modernising, pro-European wing of PASOK (the so-called "modernizers", εκσυγχρονιστές eksynchronistes), who won an internal vote against Akis Tsochatzopoulos, a Papandreou confidant. In the first days following his election, Costas Simitis faced the biggest crisis in Greek politics for over 20 years, with the Imia crisis. He was criticized for his soft stance against Turkey and especially for praising in public the American intervention on the issue.

In a PASOK conference held in the summer of 1996, following Andreas Papandreou's death, Costas Simitis was elected leader of the party and called early elections seeking a renewed public vote of confidence. Although the Imia crisis had somewhat tarnished his image, the country's economic prosperity and his matter-of-fact administration won him the September 1996 general election with a 41.5% of the vote. Under Costas Simitis' leadership, PASOK had two major successes: In September 1997 Greece won the right to stage the 2004 Summer Olympic Games and in 2001 it was confirmed that the country would be included in the Eurozone, for which it had failed to meet the convergence criteria in 1998. Costas Simitis won another term in April 2000, narrowly winning with 43.8% of the vote and 158 seats: a substantial achievement for a Party which had been in power almost continuously for nearly 20 years.

In 2000, after the assassination of Brigadier Saunders by the terrorist group 17 November (17N), and especially with the forthcoming Athens Olympics being a major terrorist target, a significant international pressure was exerted on PASOK to recognise that Greece had a terrorist problem and do everything possible to bring the terrorist group to justice. Alessandra Stanley of The New York Times reported that former CIA director James Woolsey believed there were people within PASOK who had ties to 17N and the Greek government was fearful of this being exposed. Under the guidance of British and U.S. experts, the government intensified its efforts and finally, with a string of events starting at 29 June 2002, the 17N members were captured and put to trial.

=== PASOK under the leadership of George Papandreou ===
Nevertheless, the party was losing its traditional appeal to the Greek lower and middle classes. To revitalize the party's chances for the next elections, Costas Simitis announced his resignation as the leader of the party on 7 January 2004. He was succeeded by George Papandreou, son of Andreas Papandreou. The party members were expecting that Papandreou could reverse the slide in the opinion polls which saw the opposition New Democracy (ND), under Kostas Karamanlis, 7% ahead at the start of the year.

Although Papandreou reduced ND's lead in the polls to 3%, he was unable to reverse the view of the majority of Greek voters that PASOK had been in power too long and had grown lazy, corrupt and had abandoned the inclusive and progressive principles of economic parity on which it was founded. ND had a comfortable win at the 2004 legislative elections held on 7 March 2004, placing the party in opposition after eleven years in office with 40.55% share of the vote and 117 seats.

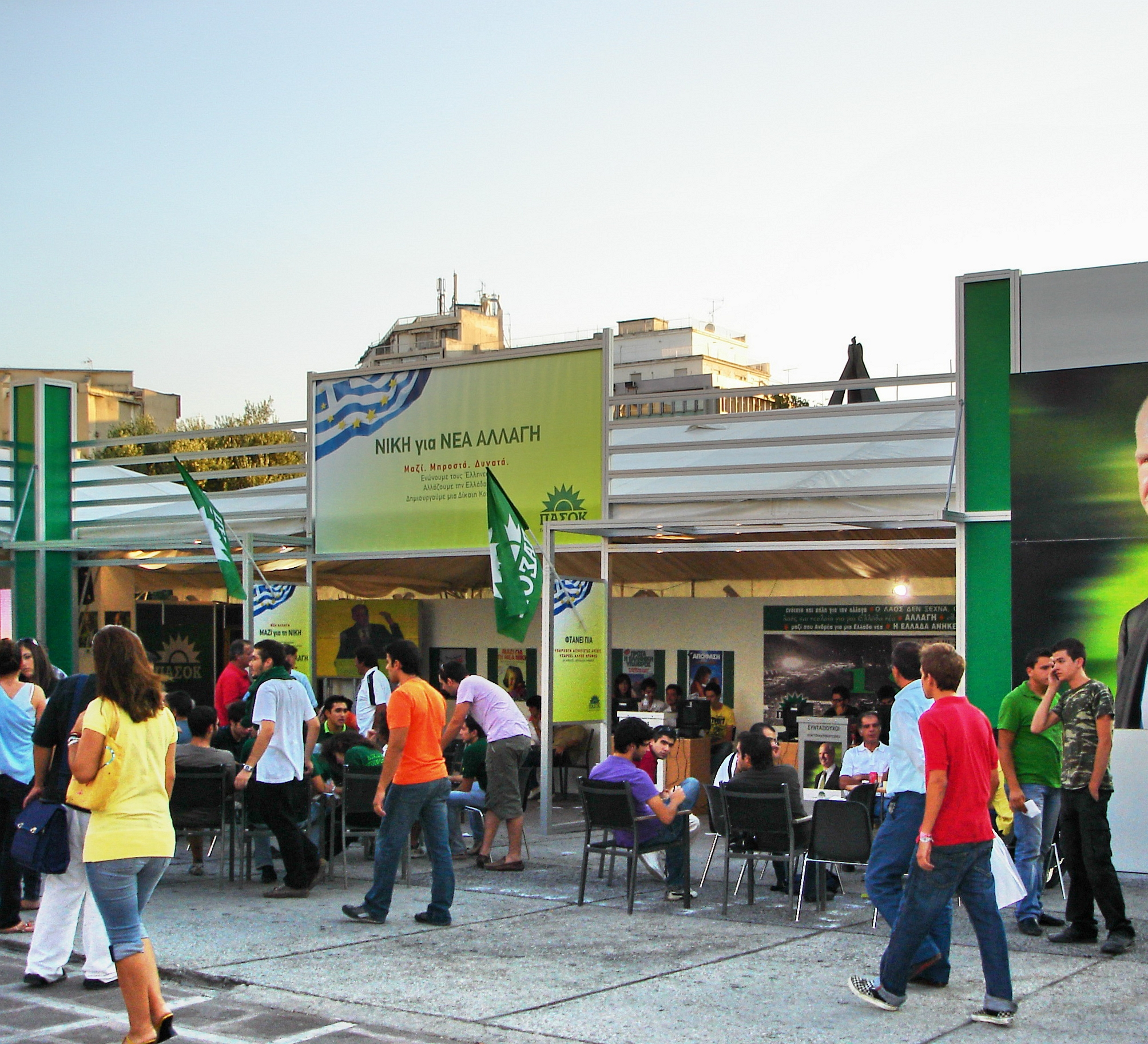
PASOK electoral campaign kiosk in Athens in 2007

On 16 September 2007, New Democracy headed by Costas Karamanlis won re-election with a marginal majority of 152 seats in the Parliament. Despite ND's falling performance in the 2007 legislative election, PASOK suffered a crushing defeat, registering 38.1% of the vote, its lowest percentage in almost 30 years, and 102 seats in the Hellenic Parliament.

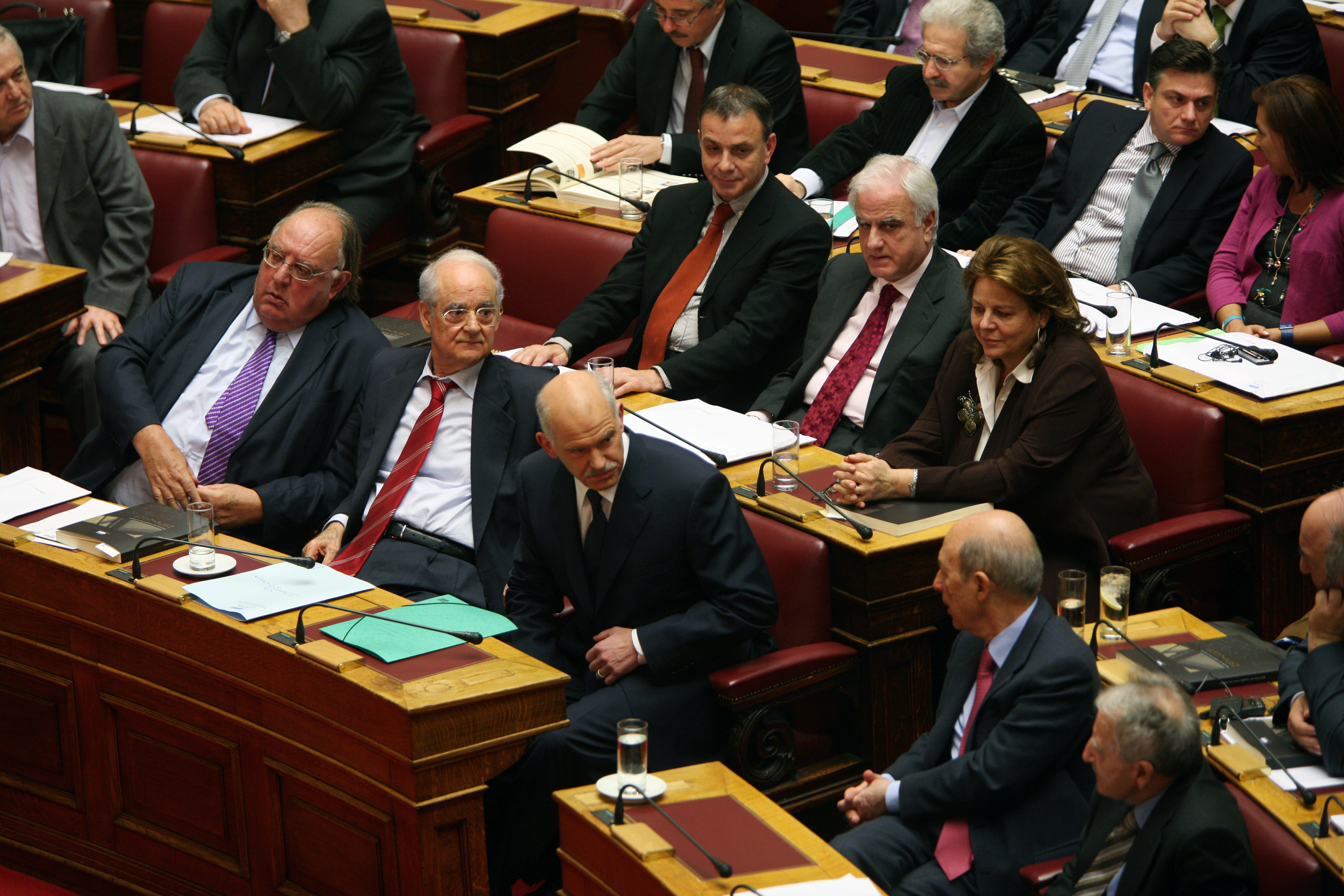
PASOK members of the Greek parliament during the discussion of the 2009 budget

The dismal result led to activation of the procedure to select a new leadership, or to reaffirm the current one. The main candidates for the leadership were the incumbent George Papandreou and the Party's informal second in command, Evangelos Venizelos. M.P. for Thessaloniki. M.P. Kostas Skandalidis also announced his candidacy in September. According to Party regulation, leaders are elected in a voting process open to all members. During the leadership election of 11 November 2007 George Papandreou was re-elected by the friends and members of the party as its leader.

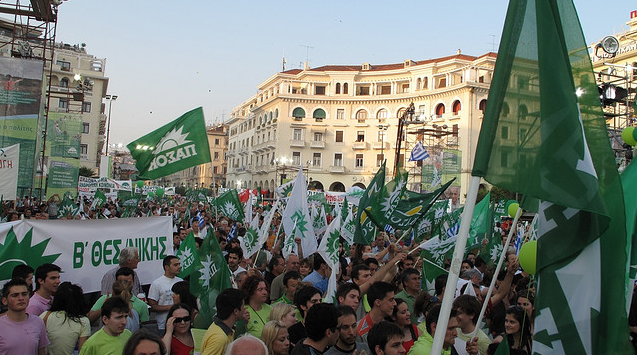
A political rally organized by the Panhellenic Socialist Movement in Thessaloniki

Legislative election 2009 results map. Green denotes those won by PASOK.

In June 2009, the PASOK won the 2009 European Parliament election in Greece. Four months later, the Party enjoyed a resounding victory in the October 2009 general elections with 43.92% of the popular vote to ND's 33.48%, and 160 parliament seats to 91. Due to a number of defections and expulsions after 2009, by November 2011 PASOK held a slim majority of 152 of the parliament's 300 seats.

=== Greek government-debt crisis and Decline (2009–2015) ===
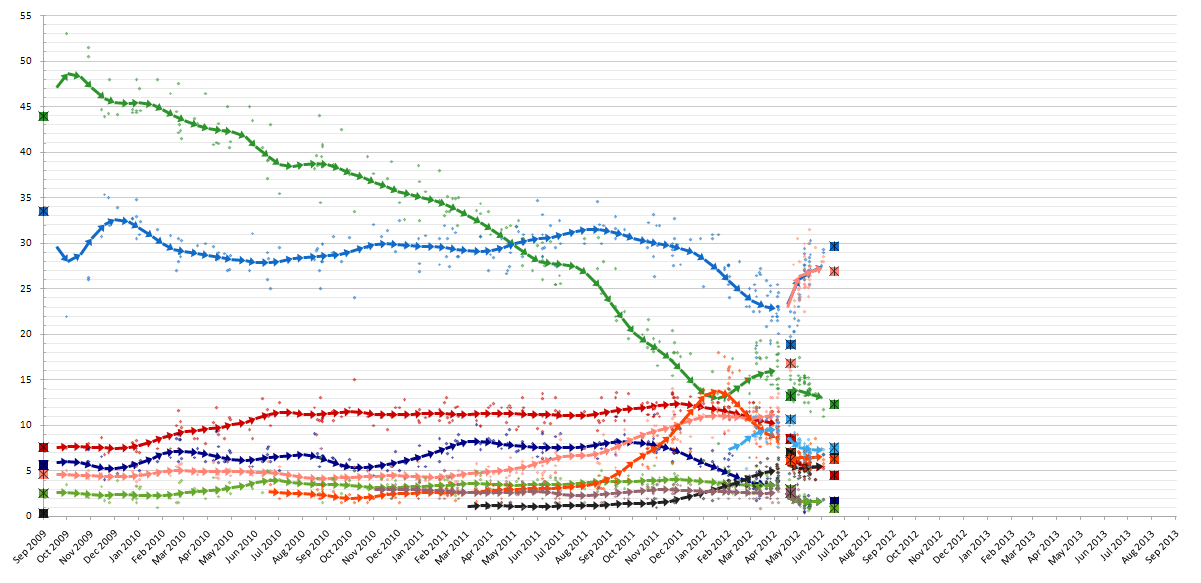
Loss of support ahead of the 2012 election

A poll in October 2011 on behalf of the Greek TV channel Skai TV and the newspaper Kathimerini (after the austerity measures that were taken to tackle the financial crisis) revealed that of the people asked, 92% felt disappointed by the government while only 5% believed that a PASOK government would be best for the nation in the next elections. In the same survey, when asked about whether people have a positive or negative opinion of the various political parties in Greece, PASOK scored as the lowest, with 76% answering "negative".

Because of the financial crisis and the measures that were taken by the party from 2009 to 2012, PASOK, having been the largest party in the outgoing coalition government, achieved only third place with a mere 13.18%, retaining just 41 seats.

After the elections of 6 May 2012, the President of Greece, Karolos Papoulias, mandated New Democracy leader Antonis Samaras to form a coalition government. On 7 May 2012, Samaras gave up the attempt and on the following day, President Papoulias mandated Alexis Tsipras, president of the Synaspismos political party and head of the Coalition of the Radical Left (SYRIZA) parliamentary group. After Tsipras was also unable to form a government, Evangelos Venizelos was mandated, but he too had no success. The legislative elections of June 2012 resulted in a further reduction in PASOK's popular support, probably as a result of the unpopular memorandum signed by former Prime Minister George Papandreou with the IMF, European Commission and European Central Bank. PASOK's share of the overall vote was its worst ever showing since the party was formed (12.28%). However PASOK decided to help the formation of a government by joining with New Democracy (ND) as well as the Democratic Left (DIMAR) of Fotis Kouvelis in a coalition under Prime Minister Samaras.

To contest the 2014 European election, PASOK founded the Olive Tree electoral alliance on 7 March 2014. In the May 2014 European elections, the Olive Tree list came in fourth place nationally, receiving 8.02% of the vote, electing 2 MEPs.

On 29 December 2014, following the failure of the government to elect a presidential candidate, a snap January 2015 legislative election was called by Prime Minister Samaras, scheduled for 25 January 2015.

=== 2015 legislative elections ===
On 2 January 2015, in the run-up to the legislative election, former Prime Minister and PASOK leader George Papandreou announced the formation of a breakaway party called Movement of Democratic Socialists (KIDISO), a move immediately condemned by PASOK officials. Five PASOK members of the Hellenic Parliament were expected to join the new party, including the former ministers Philippos Sachinidis and Dimitris Reppas.

In the 25 January 2015 legislative election, PASOK received 4.7% of the vote, with mandate for 13 seats in the Hellenic Parliament.

On 30 August 2015, ahead of the upcoming September snap election, PASOK announced an electoral alliance with DIMAR, dubbed the Democratic Alignment (DISY).

In the September 2015 legislative election on 20 September 2015, the Democratic Alignment (DISY) received 6.3% of the vote, and 17 seats.

=== KINAL (2017–2021) ===
On 12 November 2017, an open primary was used as the first round of elections to select the leader of a new, as yet unfounded centre-left party in which PASOK would be folded. Nine initial leadership candidates include PASOK leader Fofi Gennimata, The River leader Stavros Theodorakis and incumbent Athens mayor Giorgos Kaminis. Reaching the second-round election were Gennimata, with 44.5% of the vote, and PASOK MEP Nikos Androulakis with 25.4%. The run-off election on 19 November was won by Gennimata with 56% of the vote. On 28 November 2017, the name of the new party was announced as "Movement for Change" (Greek: Κίνημα Αλλαγής), abbreviated to KINAL (ΚΙΝΑΛ).

On 2 July 2018, The River left KINAL. On 20 January 2019, DIMAR also left KINAL due to its position of supporting the Prespa agreement. On 1 June 2019 former PASOK leader Evangelos Venizelos left KINAL, accusing Gennimata of turning the Movement into "SYRIZA's tail".

KINAL increased its obtained seats in the 2019 Greek legislative election compared to Democratic Alignment, becoming Greece's third-largest party or coalition and securing 22 seats in the Hellenic Parliament. Following the election, KINAL positioned itself into opposition to the new Mitsotakis Government.

Gennimata died on 25 October 2021 at the Evangelismos Hospital in Athens from cancer.

Elections for the new leader took place in December 2021, with the main candidates being Andreas Loverdos, Nikos Androulakis, and George Papandreou. Nikos Androulakis was elected to the leadership of both KINAL and PASOK on 12 December 2021.

=== Return of PASOK ===
On 9 May 2022, the alliance was rebranded back to "PASOK – Movement for Change" (PASOK–KINAL) after an internal party referendum, becoming a political party in its own right and absorbing the original party incarnation. The old PASOK emblem (the green sun) was restored soon after that.

In the May 2023 election, PASOK–KINAL managed to increase both its vote percentage by 3.36% and its share of seats in the Hellenic Parliament from 22 to 41. This increase, in combination with the electoral decline of Syriza, has raised hopes among members that the party would regain its former status as the largest opposition party.

In the 2024 European Parliament election, even though the party managed to come first in Lasithi and Heraklion, PASOK eventually came in third place, recording a 12,79% vote share. The failure to capitalize on SYRIZA's further decline led a number of MPs and elected officials, including Haris Doukas and Pavlos Geroulanos to call for an election to replace Nikos Androulakis as party leader. The first round of the PASOK party election took place on 6 October 2024 while the second round took place on 13 October.

In November 2024, the party became the official opposition following a series of defections from SYRIZA.

Owing to the provisions of a new electoral law, which does not allocate seat bonuses to coalitions, the PASOK–KINAL alliance amalgamated into a single party in 2026.

== Popular culture ==
According to several communication experts, the frequently heard phrases "PASOK Era" and "PASOK Years" have been identified and penetrated into the collective subconscious with times of prosperity and abundance of goods and money, mainly from European subsidies but also the increase of the living standards, before the economic and debt crisis of 2009. This has led to the creation of several memes comparing what a situation with PASOK would be like and how it is now.

== International and European links ==
PASOK was a member of the Socialist International, the Progressive Alliance and the Party of European Socialists. PASOK MEPs sat with the Progressive Alliance of Socialists and Democrats (S&D) group in the European Parliament.

Pasokification refers to the decline and rightward political shift of centre-left parties across Europe.

== Election results ==
=== Hellenic Parliament ===
Election	Hellenic Parliament					Rank	Government	Leader
Election	Votes	%	±pp	Seats won	+/−	Rank	Government	Leader
1974	666,413	13.58%	New	12 / 300	▲12	3rd	Opposition	Andreas Papandreou
1977	1,300,025	25.34%	+11.76	93 / 300	▲81	2nd	Opposition	Andreas Papandreou
1981	2,726,309	48.07%	+22.73	172 / 300	▲79	1st	Government	Andreas Papandreou
1985	2,916,735	45.82%	−2.25	161 / 300	▼11	1st	Government	Andreas Papandreou
Jun 1989	2,551,518	39.13%	−6.69	125 / 300	▼36	2nd	Opposition	Andreas Papandreou
Nov 1989	2,724,334	40.67%	+1.54	128 / 300	▲3	2nd	Coalition	Andreas Papandreou
1990	2,543,042	38.61%	−2.06	123 / 300	▼5	2nd	Opposition	Andreas Papandreou
1993	3,235,017	46.88%	+8.27	170 / 300	▲47	1st	Government	Andreas Papandreou
1996	2,814,779	41.49%	−5.39	162 / 300	▼8	1st	Government	Costas Simitis
2000	3,007,596	43.79%	+2.40	158 / 300	▼3	1st	Government	Costas Simitis
2004	3,003,988	40.55%	−3.34	117 / 300	▼41	2nd	Opposition	George Papandreou
2007	2,727,279	38.10%	−2.45	102 / 300	▼15	2nd	Opposition	George Papandreou
2009	3,012,373	43.92%	+5.82	160 / 300	▲58	1st	Government	George Papandreou
May 2012	833,452	13.18%	−30.74	41 / 300	▼119	3rd	Snap election	Evangelos Venizelos
Jun 2012	756,024	12.28%	−0.80	33 / 300	▼8	3rd	Coalition	Evangelos Venizelos
Jan 2015	289,469	4.68%	−7.60	13 / 300	▼20	7th	Opposition	Evangelos Venizelos
Sep 2015	341,390 (DISY)	6.29% (DISY)	+1.13 (Note: Democratic Alignment (DISY) results are compared with the combined totals for PASOK and DIMAR in the January 2015 election.)	16 / 300	▲3	4th	Opposition	Fofi Gennimata
2019	457,519 (KINAL)	8.10% (KINAL)	+1.81 (Note: Movement for Change (KINAL) results are compared with the totals for the Democratic Alignment (DISY) in the September 2015 election.)	19 / 300	▲3	3rd	Opposition	Fofi Gennimata
May 2023	676,165 (PASOK–KINAL)	11.46% (PASOK–KINAL)	+3.36	40 / 300	▲21	3rd	Snap election	Nikos Androulakis
Jun 2023	617,574 (PASOK–KINAL)	11.84% (PASOK–KINAL)	+0.38	31 / 300	▼9	3rd	Opposition	Nikos Androulakis

=== European Parliament ===
European Parliament
Election	Votes	%	±pp	Seats won	+/−	Rank	Leader	EP Group
1981	2,278,030	40.12%	New	10 / 24	New	1st	Andreas Papandreou	SOC
1984	2,476,491	41.58%	+1.46	10 / 24	0	1st	Andreas Papandreou	SOC
1989	2,352,271	35.96%	−5.62	9 / 24	▼1	2nd	Andreas Papandreou	SOC
1994	2,458,619	37.64%	+1.68	10 / 25	▲1	1st	Andreas Papandreou	PES
1999	2,115,844	32.91%	−4.73	9 / 25	▼1	2nd	Costas Simitis	PES
2004	2,083,327	34.03%	+1.12	8 / 24	▼1	2nd	George Papandreou	PES
2009	1,878,859	36.65%	+2.62	8 / 22	0	1st	George Papandreou	S&D
2014	458,403 (Elia)	8.02% (Elia)	−28.63	2 / 21	▼6	4th	Evangelos Venizelos	S&D
2019	436,726 (KINAL)	7.72% (KINAL)	−0.30	2 / 21	0	3rd	Fofi Gennimata	S&D
2024	508,399 (PASOK–KINAL)	12.79% (PASOK–KINAL)	+5.07	3 / 21	▲1	3rd	Nikos Androulakis	S&D

== Party leaders ==
#	Leader	Portrait	Term of office		election	Prime Minister
1	Andreas Papandreou		3 September 1974	23 June 1996†	—	1981–1989; 1993–1996
2	Costas Simitis		30 June 1996	8 February 2004	1996	1996–2004
3	George Papandreou		8 February 2004	18 March 2012	2004 2007	2009–2011
4	Evangelos Venizelos		18 March 2012	14 June 2015	2012	—
5	Fofi Gennimata		14 June 2015	25 October 2021†	2015	—
6	Nikos Androulakis		12 December 2021	29 March 2026	2021 2024	—

== Gallery ==
1981–2012

2012–2015

2022–2026

== See also ==
- PASOKification
- History of Greece
- List of political parties in Greece
- Socialism in Greece
- Politics of Greece
- Party of European Socialists
- Progressive Alliance of Socialists and Democrats
- Socialist International
- For our Crete

== Sources ==
- Dimitris Michalopoulos, "PASOK and the Eastern Block", in Greece under Socialism, New Rochelle, New York: Orpheus Publishing Inc., 1988, pp. 339–337. ISBN 0-89241-460-X
