= George Papandreou =

Greek politician, president of the Socialist International (born 1952)

- Γιώργος Παπανδρέου
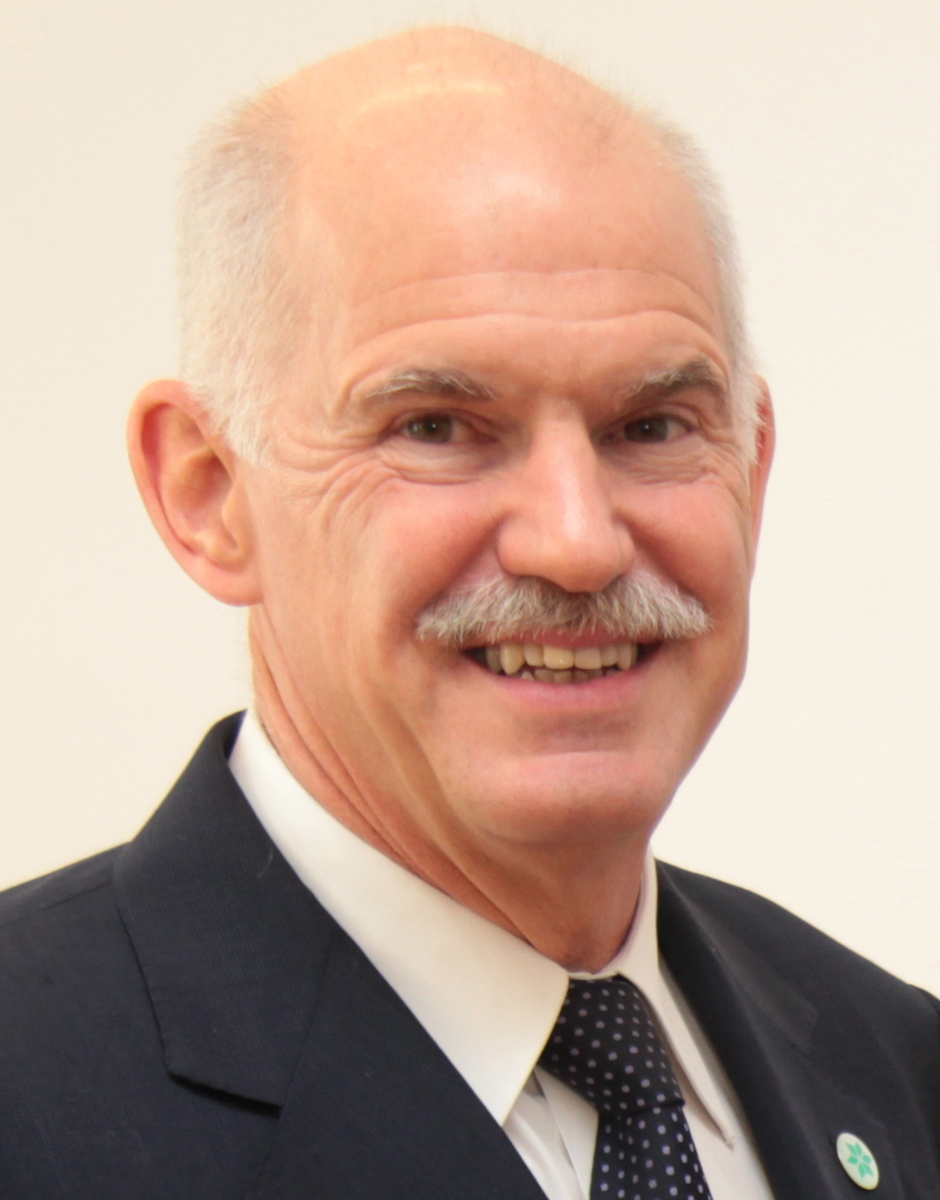
- Papandreou in 2011

Prime Minister of Greece
- In office 6 October 2009 – 11 November 2011
- President: Karolos Papoulias
- Deputy: Theodoros Pangalos; Evangelos Venizelos
- Preceded by: Kostas Karamanlis
- Succeeded by: Lucas Papademos

Leader of the Opposition
- In office 10 March 2004 – 6 October 2009
- Prime Minister: Kostas Karamanlis
- Preceded by: Kostas Karamanlis
- Succeeded by: Kostas Karamanlis
Other political offices
President of the Panhellenic Socialist Movement
In office 8 February 2004 – 18 March 2012
Preceded by	Costas Simitis
Succeeded by	Evangelos Venizelos
President of the Socialist International
In office 30 January 2006 – 25 November 2022
Secretary General	Luis Ayala
Preceded by	António Guterres
Succeeded by	Pedro Sánchez
Minister of Foreign Affairs
In office 6 October 2009 – 7 September 2010
Prime Minister	Himself
Preceded by	Dora Bakoyannis
Succeeded by	Dimitrios Droutsas
In office 18 February 1999 – 13 February 2004
Prime Minister	Costas Simitis
Preceded by	Theodoros Pangalos
Succeeded by	Tassos Yiannitsis
President of the Movement of Democratic Socialists
In office 3 January 2015 – 29 March 2026
Preceded by	Office established
Succeeded by	Office abolished
Minister of National Education and Religious Affairs
In office 8 July 1994 – 25 September 1996
Prime Minister	Andreas Papandreou
Preceded by	Dimitrios Fatouros
Succeeded by	Gerasimos Arsenis
In office 22 June 1988 – 2 July 1989
Prime Minister	Andreas Papandreou
Preceded by	Apostolos Kaklamanis
Succeeded by	Vasileios Kontogiannopoulos
Member of the Hellenic Parliament for Achaea
Incumbent
Assumed office 17 July 2019
In office 18 October 1981 – 31 December 2014

Personal details
- Born: George Jeffrey Papandreou; 16 June 1952 (age 74) Ramsey, Minnesota, U.S.
- Party: PASOK – Movement for Change
- Other political affiliations: Movement of Democratic Socialists (2015–2026); PASOK (until 2015)
- Spouses: Eva Zissimidou (m. 1976; div. 1987); Ada Papapanou (m. 1989; div. 2016)
- Children: 2
- Parent(s): Andreas Papandreou (father); Margaret Chant-Papandreou (mother)
- Relatives: Nikos Papandreou (brother); Georgios Papandreou (grandfather)
- Education: Amherst College (BA); London School of Economics (MSc)
- Website: papandreou.gr

George Andreas Papandreou (Greek: Γεώργιος Ανδρέας Παπανδρέου, pronounced [ʝeˈorʝios papanˈðreu], shortened to Giorgos (Γιώργος) [ˈʝorɣos] to distinguish him from his grandfather; born 16 June 1952) is an American-born Greek politician who served as Prime Minister of Greece from 2009 to 2011. He is currently serving as an MP for PASOK-Kinima Allagis.

Belonging to a political dynasty of long standing, he served under his father, then-prime minister Andreas Papandreou as Minister for National Education and Religious Affairs (1988–1989 and 1994–1996). He served as Minister for Foreign Affairs under Prime Minister Costas Simitis from 1999 to 2004. Papandreou was leader of the Panhellenic Socialist Movement (PASOK) party, which his father founded, from February 2004 until March 2012, and president of the Socialist International from 30 January 2006 to 25 November 2022.

On 6 October 2009, George Papandreou became the 182nd Prime Minister of Greece. He was the third member of the Papandreou family to serve as the country's prime minister, following his father Andreas and his grandfather Georgios Papandreou. He resigned on 11 November 2011 during the Greek government debt crisis to make way for a national unity government.

In March 2012, he resigned as leader of PASOK, and in January 2015, he left the party completely, founding his own political party, the Movement of Democratic Socialists (KIDISO), which was the 8th most voted-for party in the January 2015 elections, but did not manage to enter Parliament. In 2017, KIDISO joined the Democratic Alignment, a political alliance formed by PASOK and other centre-left parties. Democratic Alignment later evolved into Movement for Change, which in the 2019 elections was the third most voted-for party, with Papandreou himself returning to Parliament as an MP representing the region of Achaea.

== Early life and education ==
Papandreou was born 16 June 1952 in Ramsey, Minnesota, United States, where his father, Andreas Papandreou, at that time held a professorship at the University of Minnesota. His mother is the American-born Margaret Papandreou, née Chant. He renounced his US citizenship in 2000.

He received his secondary education at schools in Illinois in the United States, in Sweden, and graduated from King City Secondary School (near Toronto) in Canada in 1970. He attended Amherst College in Massachusetts (where he was a friend and dormitory roommate of future political rival and prime minister of Greece himself, Antonis Samaras), Stockholm University, the London School of Economics and Harvard University. He has a Bachelor of Arts degree in sociology from Amherst (1975) and a master's degree in sociology from the LSE (1977). He was a researcher on immigration issues at Stockholm University in 1972–73. He was also a fellow of the Foreign Relations Center of Harvard University in 1992–93.

In 2002 he was awarded an honorary doctorate of laws by Amherst College and in 2006 he was named distinguished professor in the Center for Hellenic Studies by Georgia State College of Arts and Science.

Papandreou's father studied and worked as professor of economics from 1939 to 1959. His paternal grandfather, Georgios Papandreou, was a three-time prime minister of Greece.

== Political career ==
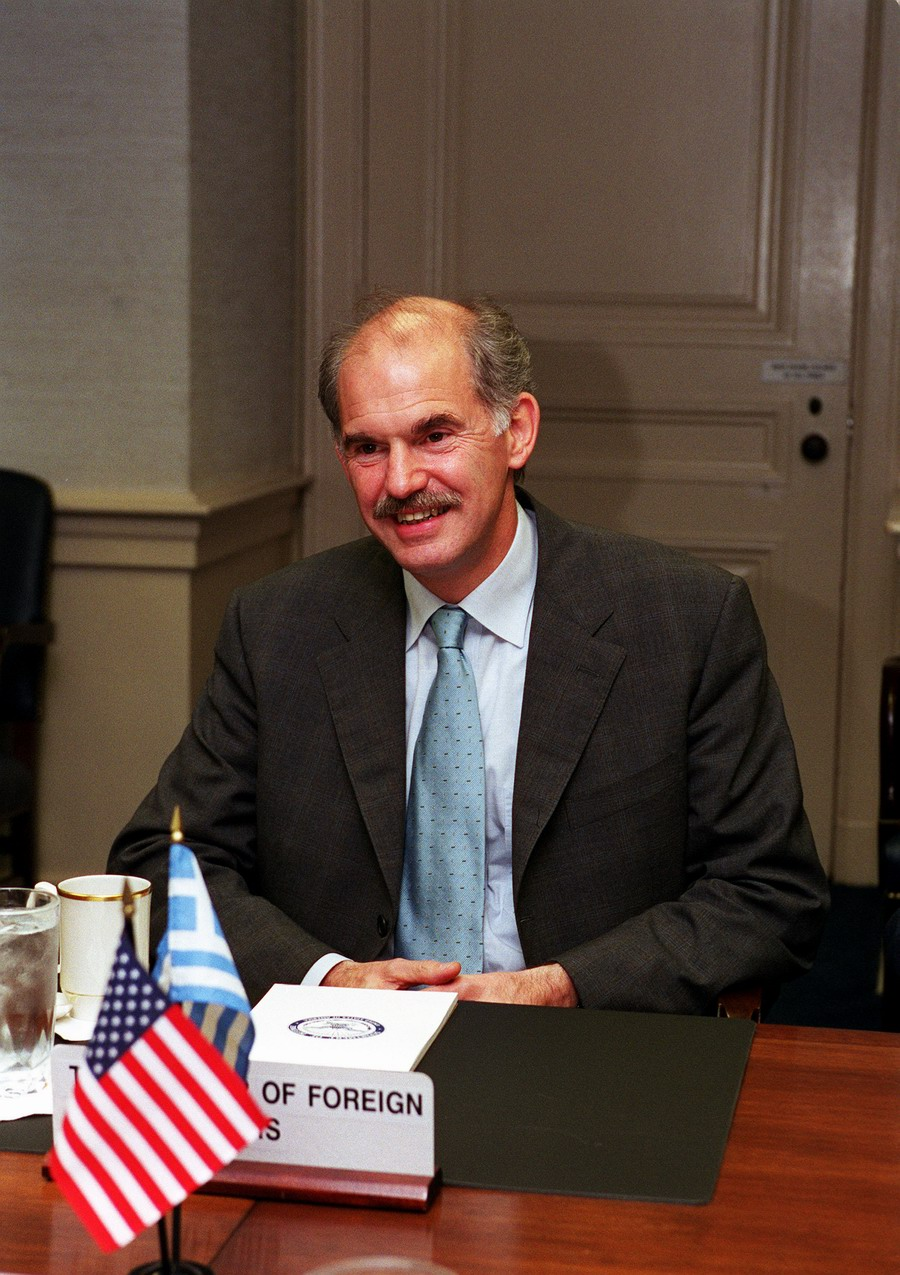
Papandreou in 2001, as Minister of Foreign Affairs

The younger George Papandreou came to Greece after the restoration of Greek democracy in 1974. He then became active in the political party his father had founded, the Panhellenic Socialist Movement (PASOK). He joined the Central Committee of PASOK in 1984.

Papandreou was elected to the Greek Parliament in 1981, the year his father became prime minister, as MP for the constituency of Achaea. He became Under Secretary for Cultural Affairs in 1985, Minister of Education and Religious Affairs in 1988, Deputy Minister of Foreign Affairs in 1993, Minister for Education and Religious Affairs again in 1994, Deputy Minister of Foreign Affairs again in 1996 and Minister of Foreign Affairs in February 1999. He was also Minister Responsible for Government Coordination for the Bid for 2004 Olympic Games in 1997.

In his second term as Minister of Education, Papandreou was the first politician in Greece to introduce affirmative action, allocating 5% of university posts for the Muslim minority in Thrace. He was also instrumental in initiating the Open University in Greece.

Papandreou received numerous awards and honorary degrees in recognition of his work for human rights. As foreign minister he fostered closer relations with Turkey and Albania. He worked to solve the dispute over Cyprus. Papandreou also worked to resolve tensions regarding the Macedonia naming dispute. Papandreou stated in 1999 that he supported Turkey's application to join the European Union.

In December 2003, European Voice shortlisted him for nomination of the Europeans of the Year award as "Diplomat of the Year", naming him as "The Bridge-Builder" and quoting Le Monde that dubbed him the "architect of Greek-Turkish rapprochement". He is a founding member of the Helsinki Citizens' Assembly.

== President of PASOK (2004–2012) ==
In anticipation of the 2004 national elections in Greece, polls indicated that PASOK was very likely to lose as the conservative New Democracy party was heading towards a landslide. In January 2004, the incumbent PM Costas Simitis announced his resignation as leader of PASOK, and passed the leadership to Papandreou by recommending him as the new leader. On 8 February 2004 PASOK introduced for the first time the procedure of open primaries for the election of party leadership. Even if Papandreou had no opponent, this was a move designed to solidify the open primaries, democratize the party, and make a clean break with the tradition of "dynastic politics".

In May 2005, Papandreou was elected vice president of the Socialist International following a proposal by the former president, António Guterres. In January 2006, Papandreou was unanimously elected president of the Socialist International.

In the 2007 general election, PASOK again lost to the incumbent New Democracy party of Kostas Karamanlis and Papandreou's leadership was challenged by Evangelos Venizelos and Kostas Skandalidis. Papandreou, however, retained his party's leadership at a leadership election in November.

In June 2009 and under his leadership, his party won the 2009 European Parliament election in Greece. Four months later, PASOK won the October 2009 general elections with 43.92% of the popular vote to ND's 33.48%, and 160 parliament seats to 91.

== Prime Minister of Greece (2009–2011) ==
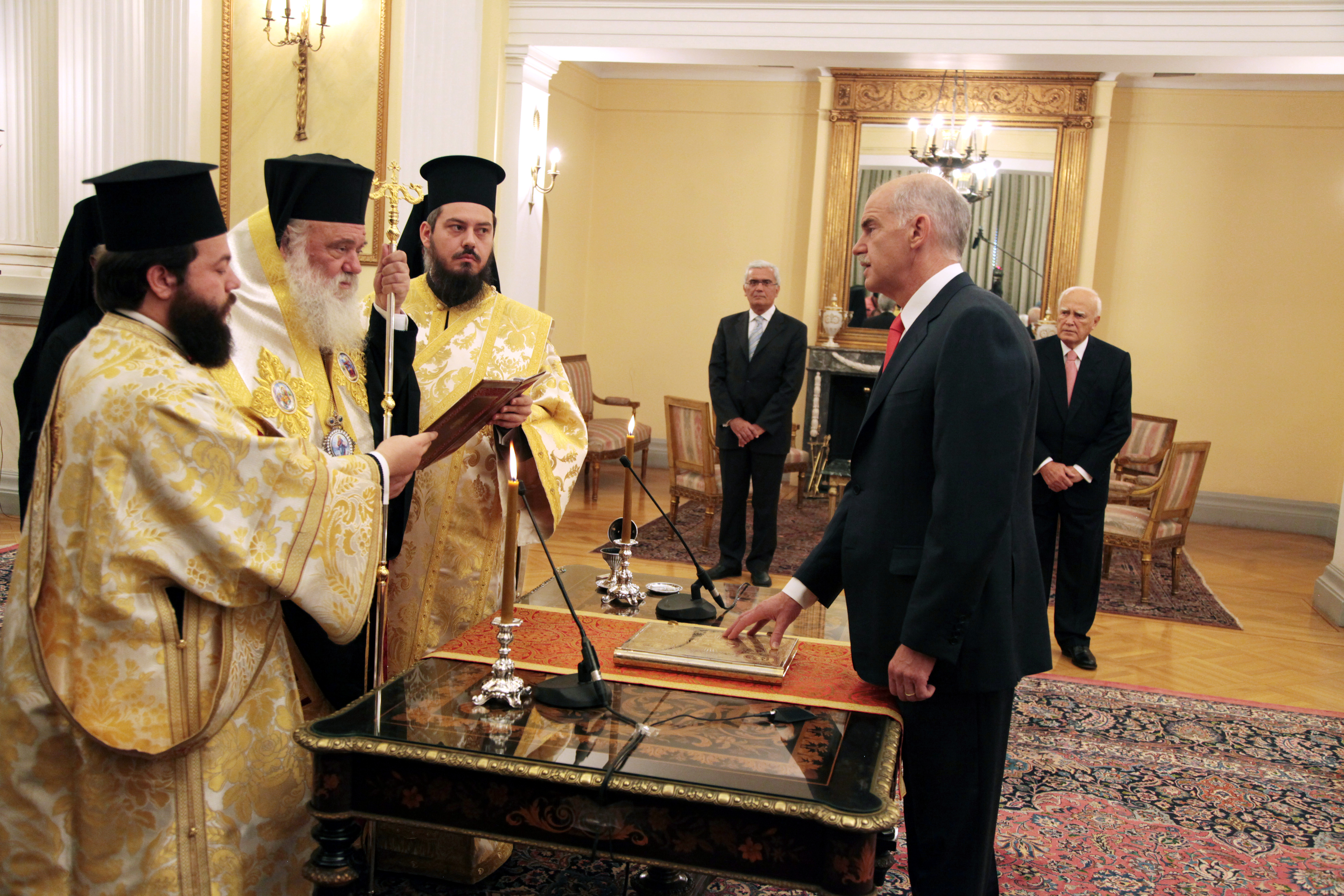
George Papandreou takes the oath of office of the Prime Minister of Greece.

=== Taking office and revelations ===
The inauguration of George Papandreou as the 182nd Prime Minister of Greece took place on 6 October 2009.

Upon inauguration, Papandreou's government revealed that its finances were far worse than previous announcements, with a year deficit of 12.7% of GDP, four times more than the eurozone's limit, and a public debt of $410 billion. This announcement served only to worsen the severe crisis the Greek economy was undergoing, with an unemployment rate of 10% and the country's debt rating being lowered to BBB+, the lowest in the eurozone. Papandreou responded by promoting austerity measures, reducing spending, increasing taxes, freezing additional taxes and hiring and introducing measures aimed at combatting rampant tax evasion and reducing the country's public sector. The announced austerity program caused a wave of nationwide strikes and has been criticised by both the EU and the eurozone nations' finance ministers as falling short of its goals.

=== Crisis management and bailouts ===
On 23 April 2010 during a visit at the island of Kastelorizo, Papandreou issued a statement to the press that he instructed Finance Minister Papakonstantinou to officially ask the EU partners to activate the support mechanism, 'an unprecedented mechanism in the history and practice of the European Union'. The support mechanism, which was put in place by the European heads of state and government and further elaborated by Eurogroup ministers, is a European mechanism to which the IMF is associated with financing and it involves a comprehensive three-year economic program and financing conditions. On 23 April 2010, Dominique Strauss-Kahn, the managing director of the International Monetary Fund (IMF) announced that Greece made a request for a Stand-By Arrangement. Papandreou and his Finance Minister Giorgos Papakonstantinou managed to convince the IMF and EU to participate in a €110bn bailout package on 9 May 2010. Greece's sovereign debt crisis, considered part of the European sovereign debt crisis, was marked by massive strikes and demonstrations.

In an opinion poll published on 18 May 2011, 77% of the people asked said they had no faith in Papandreou as prime minister in handling the Greek economic crisis.

On 25 May 2011 the Real Democracy Now! movement started protesting in Athens and other major Greek cities. At the time, the peaceful protests were considered to be a sign of popular rejection of Mr. Papandreou and his government's economic policies, with as much as three-quarters of the Greek population being against the policies of the Papandreou government. Among the demands of the demonstrations at Athens's central square, who claim to have been over 500,000 at one point, was the resignation of Papandreou and his government.

In the early hours of 22 June, George Papandreou and his government narrowly survived a Motion of no confidence in the Hellenic Parliament, with 155 of the 300 seats in parliament. His government held 152 seats.

On 17 September, he cancelled a visit to the IMF building in Washington, D.C., and the UN Headquarters in New York City amid mounting concern over the country's debt crisis.

An opinion poll by Public Issue on behalf of Skai TV and Kathimerini in October 2011 showed that Papandreou's popularity had dropped considerably. Of the people asked, only 23% had a positive view of George Papandreou, while 73% had a negative opinion; ranking him lower than any other leader of a party in the Hellenic Parliament. Papandreou also ranked low on the question of who is more suitable for prime minister, with just 22%, as both Antonis Samaras (28%) and "neither" (47%) ranked higher than him.

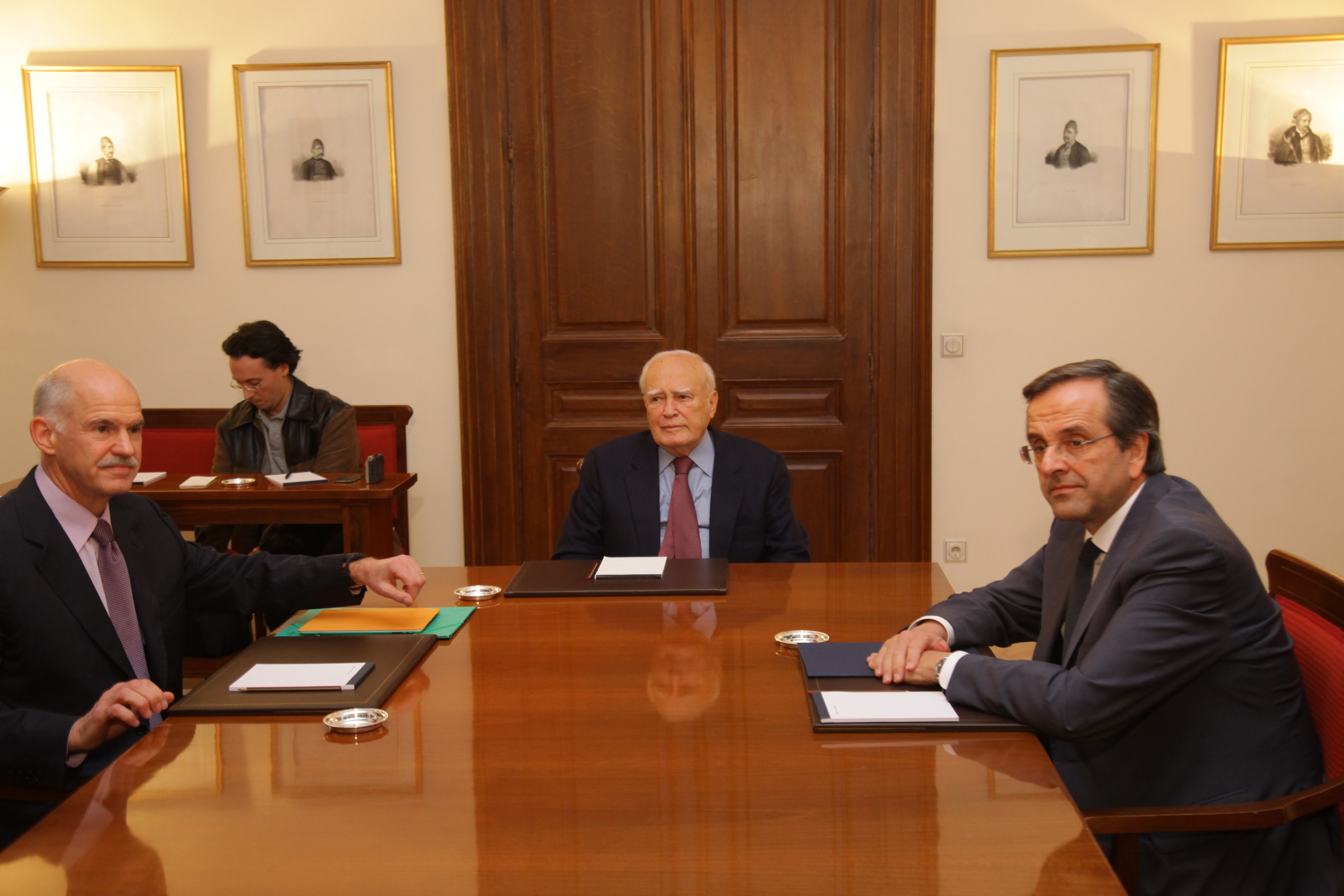
George Papandreou and Antonis Samaras with Karolos Papoulias, the President of Greece, on 6 November 2011 discussing the formation of a caretaker government.

On 26 October 2011, the European Summit agreed to hand to the Greek government the Sixth Tranche of €8 billion bailout early in the 2012, while the private-sector banks, the holders of Greek debt, have agreed to a 50% haircut on their outstanding Greek government bonds.

On 28 October 2011, during the national day parade, protesters blocked the parades, forcing the President of Greece and other officials to leave.

=== Called-off referendum and stepping aside ===
On 31 October, Papandreou announced his government's plans to hold a referendum on the acceptance of the terms of a eurozone bailout deal. The referendum was to be held in December 2011 or January 2012. However, following the insistence of EU leaders at the G20 summit in Cannes that the referendum should be on Greece's continued membership of the eurozone, and severe criticism of such a referendum by Greek Finance Minister Venizelos and within parliament, Papandreou scrapped the plan on 3 November.

On 5 November, his government only narrowly won a confidence vote in parliament and opposition leader Antonis Samaras called for immediate elections. The next day Papandreou met with opposition leaders trying to reach an agreement on the formation of an interim national unity government. However, Samaras gave in only after Papandreou agreed to step aside, allowing the EU bailout to proceed and paving the way for elections on 19 February 2012. Both the Communist Party (KKE) and the leftist SYRIZA coalition had refused Papandreou's invitation to join talks on a new unity government.

Following several days of intense negotiations, the two major parties along with the Popular Orthodox Rally agreed to form a grand coalition headed by former vice president of the European Central Bank Lucas Papademos. On 10 November, George Papandreou formally resigned as Prime Minister of Greece. The new coalition cabinet and Prime Minister Lucas Papademos were formally sworn in on 11 November 2011.

== Comeback aspirations ==
In August 2012, Papandreou was re-elected president of the Socialist International at its congress in Cape Town. Within domestic politics, he however remained largely sidelined within PASOK, while still an ordinary Member of the Hellenic Parliament.

On 2 January 2015, Papandreou announced his aspirations to return to high-profile domestic politics. Launching his new party Movement of Democratic Socialists to contest the 25 January 2015 parliamentary elections, he confirmed the long-expected breakup with PASOK.

While his decision was fiercely criticized by PASOK officials, Papandreou referred to the extraordinary situation with the country facing important challenges amidst a highly polarized political situation. He said that under these circumstances he "needed to make a bold political choice. PASOK, the party I belonged to since my youth, and led for many years, had become assimilated into conservative practices and policies."

Receiving only 2.46% of the electoral vote, Papandreou's new party however fell short of the 3% electoral threshold. His failure to be reelected marks the first time since 1923 where a representative of the Papandreou political dynasty is not present in the Hellenic Parliament. Following the election he said in a BBC Newsnight interview that his conscience was clear: "I was able to save Greece from default."

In March 2017, at the Congress of the Socialist International that took place in Cartagena, Colombia, Papandreou was unanimously re-elected president of the organization.

He is also co-chair of the Democratic Alignment, a coalition of the center left parties in Greece, composed by the Panhellenic Socialist Movement (PASOK), the Democratic Left (DIMAR) and the Movement of Democratic Socialists.

In May 2017, Papandreou delivered the keynote speech to the European Association of Political Consultants (EAPC) in Brussels. On 20 October 2021, Papandreou announced his candidacy for the leadership of Movement for Change (Greece). In 2023, he gave the Young Fabians' inaugural Dick Leonard Memorial Lecture.

== Personal life ==
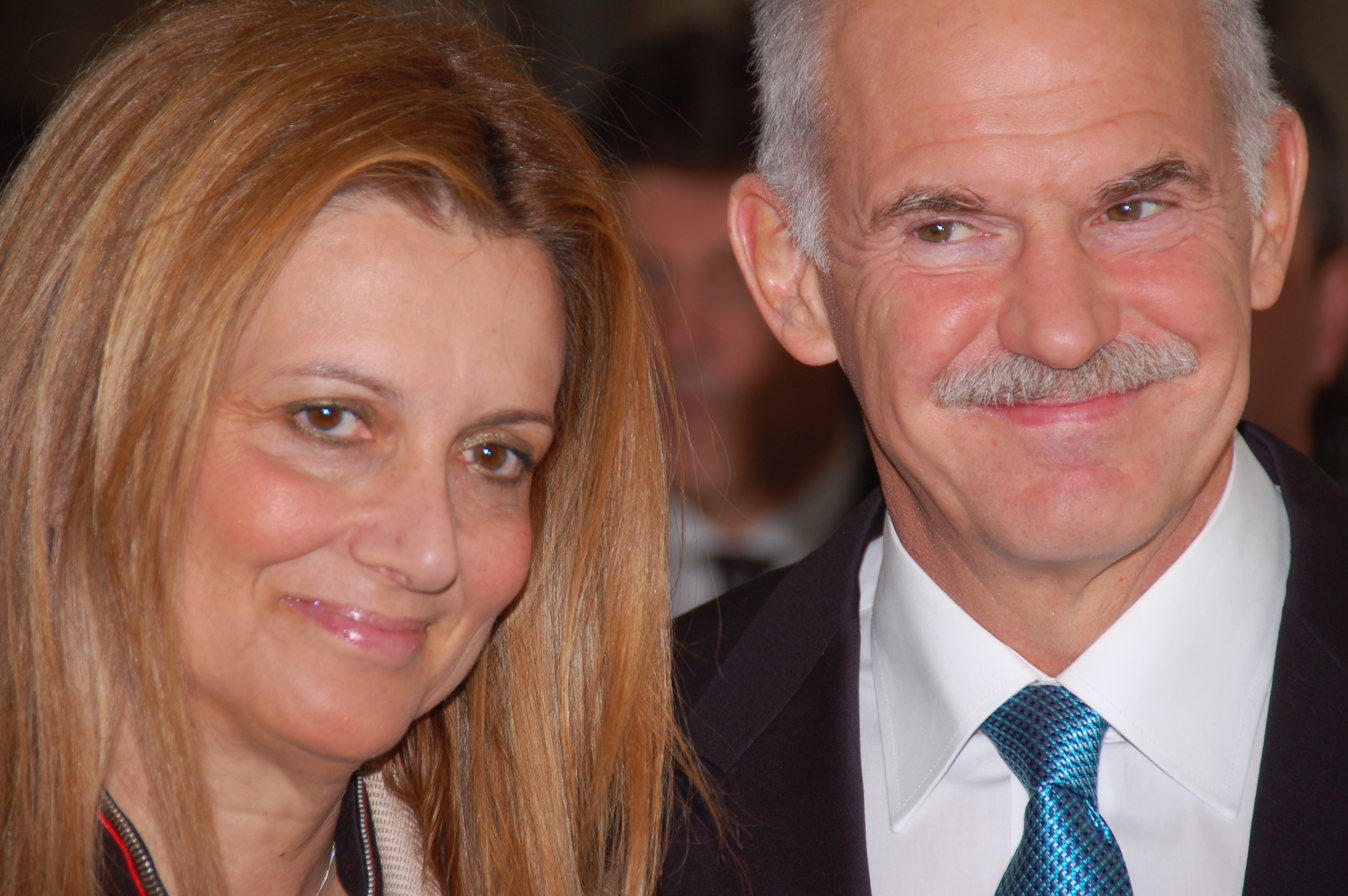
Papandreou and his then-wife attend the Quadriga Award 2010 ceremony on 3 October 2010 in Berlin.

George Papandreou was married to Ada Papapanou, until 2016, and they have a daughter, Margarita-Elena (born 1990). He also has a son, Andreas (born 1982), from a previous civil wedding to Evanthia Zissimidou (1976–1987), who is from Cyprus.

He has two younger brothers, Nikos Papandreou and Andreas Papandreou, and two younger sisters, Sophia Papandreou and Emilia Nyblom.

Apart from Greek and English, he is also fluent in Swedish. One of his paternal great-grandfathers, Zygmunt Mineyko, was an army officer and an engineer of Polish-Lithuanian descent.

In 2016, Papandreou co-signed a letter to Ban Ki-moon calling for a more humane drug policy, along with people like Glenn Greenwald, Olusegun Obasanjo and Anthony D. Romero.

== Honours and decorations ==
- 1996: Commander of the Order of Prince Yaroslav the Wise (Ukraine)
- 1996: Grand Cross of the Order of the Lion (Finland)
- 1996: Order of Merit of the Republic of Poland II class (Poland)
- 1998: Grand Cross of the Order of Civil Merit (Spain)
- 1999: Grand Cross of the Order of the Polar Star (Sweden)
- 1999: Order of the White Star I class (Estonia)
- 1999: Grand Decoration of Honour in Gold with Sash of the Decoration of Honour for Services to the Republic of Austria
- 2000: Grand Cross of the Order of Merit of the Federal Republic of Germany
- 2001: Grand Cross of the Order of Isabella the Catholic (Spain)
- 2001: Grand Cross of the Order of the Crown (Belgium)
- 2002: Grand Cross of the Order of Infante dom Henrique (Portugal)
- 2002: Grand Cross of the Order of Pope Pius IX (Vatican)
- 2003: Grand Commander of the Order of Merit of the Republic of Hungary
- 2003: Knight Grand Cross of the Order of Merit of the Italian Republic
- 2003: Gran Cruz Order of the Sun of Peru (Peru)

== Awards ==
- 1988: " Botsis's Foundation for the Promotion of Journalism " award for "his multifaceted struggles, which established the Free Radio as part of our democratic institutions"
- 1996: SOS against anti-Semitism, and affiliated organizations" Committee award, for his work against anti-Semitism
- 1997: Abdi Ipekci special award for Peace and Friendship ( June 1997) "for his activities in favor of Greek-Turkish approach during the period 1995–1996 while serving as Minister of National Education and Religion"
- 2000: Eastwest Institute 2000 Awards – Peace Building Awards . The 2000 "Statesman of the Year Award" given to Foreign Minister George Papandreou of Greece and Foreign Minister Ismail Cem of Turkey for their great efforts at improving relations between their respective countries
- 2002: Jackie Robinson Humanitarian Award (United States Sport Academy)
- 2003: Recipient: Defender of Democracy (Parliamentarians for Global Action)
- 2006: Open Fields Award (Truce Foundation USA)
- 2010: Quadriga Award (Werkstatt Deutschland, Germany), for The Power of Veracity (transparency regarding the state of the Greek economy)

== See also ==
- Politics of Greece
- List of prime ministers of Greece

Political offices
Preceded by Apostolos Kaklamanis	Minister of National Education and Religious Affairs; 1988–1989	Succeeded by Vasileios Kontogiannopoulos
Preceded by Dimitrios Fatouros	Minister of National Education and Religious Affairs; 1994–1996	Succeeded by Gerasimos Arsenis
Preceded by Theodoros Pangalos	Minister for Foreign Affairs; 1999–2004	Succeeded by Tassos Yiannitsis
Preceded by Kostas Karamanlis	Leader of the Opposition; 2004–2009	Succeeded by Kostas Karamanlis
Preceded by Kostas Karamanlis	Prime Minister of Greece; 2009–2011	Succeeded by Lucas Papademos
Preceded by Dora Bakoyannis	Minister for Foreign Affairs; 2009–2010	Succeeded by Dimitrios Droutsas
Party political offices
Preceded by Costas Simitis	President of the Panhellenic Socialist Movement; 2004–2012	Succeeded by Evangelos Venizelos
Preceded by António Guterres	President of the Socialist International; 2006–2022	Succeeded by Pedro Sánchez
Order of precedence
Preceded by Kostas Karamanlis as former Prime Minister	Order of precedence of Greece; Former Prime Minister	Succeeded by Loukas Papadimos as former Prime Minister
