= Evangelos Venizelos =

Greek politician (born 1957)

- Ευάγγελος Βενιζέλος
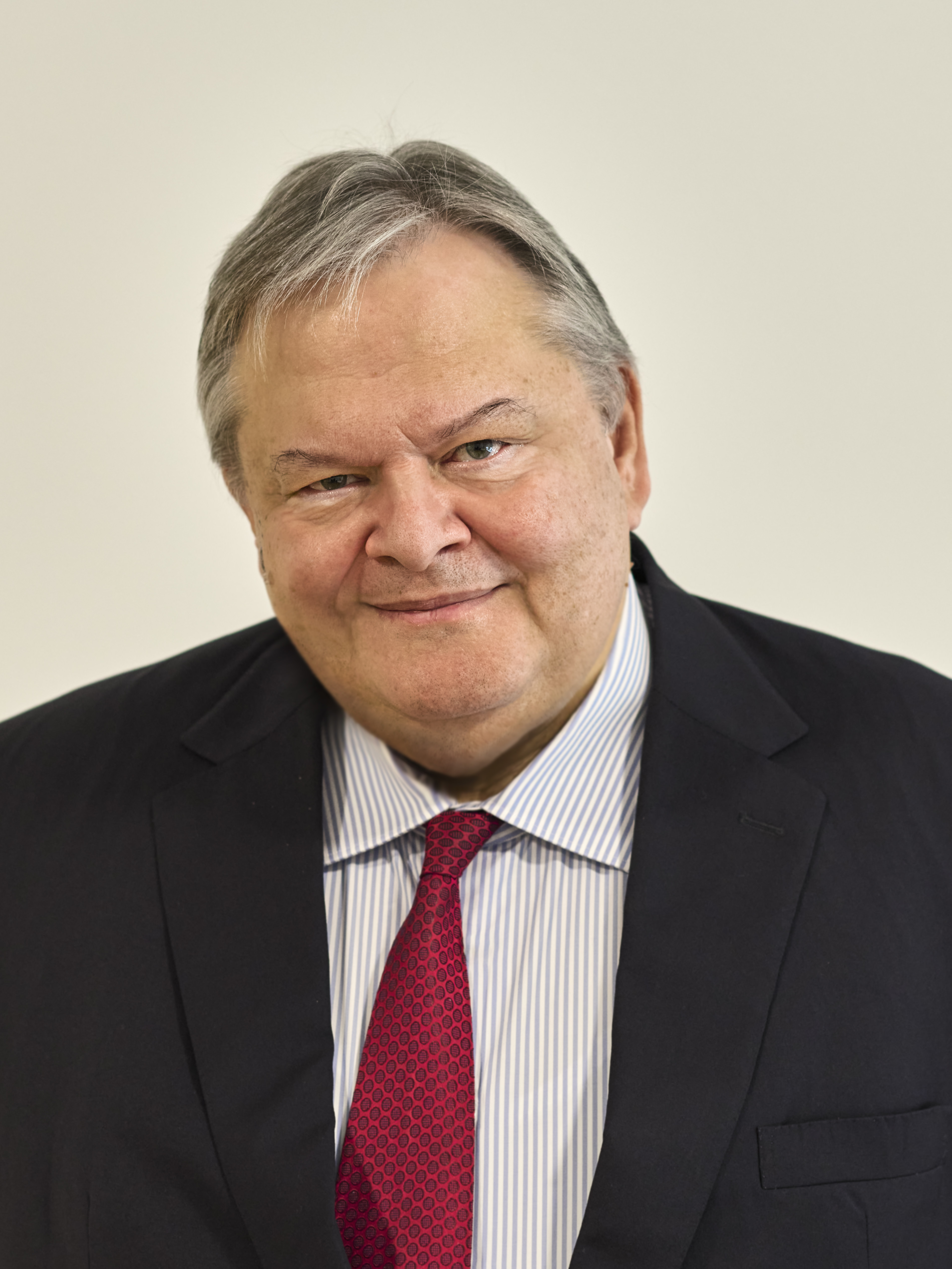
- Venizelos in 2019

Deputy Prime Minister of Greece
- In office 25 June 2013 – 27 January 2015
- Prime Minister: Antonis Samaras
- Preceded by: Vacant
- Succeeded by: Yannis Dragasakis
- In office 17 June 2011 – 21 March 2012
- Prime Minister: George Papandreou; Lucas Papademos
- Preceded by: Theodoros Pangalos
- Succeeded by: Vacant

President of the Panhellenic Socialist Movement
- In office 18 March 2012 – 14 June 2015
- Preceded by: George Papandreou
- Succeeded by: Fofi Gennimata
Ministerial offices
Minister of Foreign Affairs
In office 25 June 2013 – 27 January 2015
Prime Minister	Antonis Samaras
Preceded by	Dimitris Avramopoulos
Succeeded by	Nikos Kotzias
Minister of Finance
In office 17 June 2011 – 21 March 2012
Prime Minister	George Papandreou; Lucas Papademos
Preceded by	Giorgos Papakonstantinou
Succeeded by	Philippos Sachinidis
Minister of National Defence
In office 7 October 2009 – 17 June 2011
Prime Minister	George Papandreou
Preceded by	Vangelis Meimarakis
Succeeded by	Panagiotis Beglitis
Minister of Culture
In office 21 November 2000 – 10 March 2004
Prime Minister	Costas Simitis
Preceded by	Theodoros Pangalos
Succeeded by	Kostas Karamanlis
In office 26 September 1996 – 19 February 1999
Prime Minister	Costas Simitis
Preceded by	Stavros Benos
Succeeded by	Elisavet Papazoi
Minister of Development
In office 19 February 1999 – 13 April 2000
Prime Minister	Costas Simitis
Preceded by	Vasso Papandreou
Succeeded by	Nikos Christodoulakis
Minister of Justice
In office 22 January 1996 – 30 August 1996
Prime Minister	Costas Simitis
Preceded by	Ioannis Pottakis
Succeeded by	Anargyros Fatouros
Minister of Transport and Communications
In office 15 September 1995 – 22 January 1996
Prime Minister	Andreas Papandreou
Preceded by	Athanasios Tsouras
Succeeded by	Haris Kastanidis
Minister of the Press and the Media
In office 8 July 1994 – 15 September 1995
Prime Minister	Andreas Papandreou
Preceded by	Position established
Succeeded by	Tilemachos Chitiris

Member of the Hellenic Parliament
- In office 10 October 1993 – 11 June 2019
- Constituency: Thessaloniki A

Personal details
- Born: 1 January 1957 (age 69) Thessaloniki, Greece
- Party: PASOK – Movement for Change
- Other political affiliations: PASOK
- Spouse: Vasiliki Bakatselou
- Children: 1
- Education: Aristotle University of Thessaloniki; Panthéon-Assas University
- Profession: Politician; Lawyer; Professor
- Website: Official website

Evangelos Venizelos (Greek: Ευάγγελος Βενιζέλος, pronounced [eˈvaɲɟeloz veniˈzelos]; born 1 January 1957) is a Greek academic and former politician who served as Deputy Prime Minister of Greece during two periods, from 2011 to 2012 and from 2013 to 2015. He also served as Minister of Foreign Affairs from 2013 to 2015 and as Minister of Finance from 2011 to 2012. In 1993 he was elected as member of the Hellenic Parliament for the PASOK representing Thessaloniki A until 2019. In academia he is a Professor of Constitutional Law at the Law School of the Aristotle University of Thessaloniki.

On 18 March 2012, Venizelos was elected unopposed to replace George Papandreou as PASOK president and led the party in the May 2012 general election as well as the June 2012 general election.

== Early life and education ==
Evangelos Venizelos was born in Thessaloniki on 1 January 1957. He is unrelated to his famous namesake, Eleftherios Venizelos. He is married to Lila A. Bakatselou and has a daughter. He was an undergraduate at the Aristotle University of Thessaloniki from 1974 through 1978 and completed postgraduate studies at Panthéon-Assas University in France. In 1980, he received his PhD in Law from the Aristotle University of Thessaloniki.

Besides his mother tongue, Greek, he speaks French and English.

== Early career ==
Venizelos is the author of a number of books, monographs and papers, including most recently Agenda 16 (Greek: Ατζέντα 16) in 2007, a collection of writings about the future of the university system in Greece, including some articles previously published on the web. Other writings have dealt with current political issues and the media, foreign policy, and developmental policy. His recent works focus more on political theory and cultural issues. He strongly opposes the clash of civilizations theory, and has written extensively about the Greek "civilization of civilizations".

== Political career ==
As a student, Venizelos served on the Central Council of the Student Union of the University of Thessaloniki (FEAPT) in 1977, and the National Student Union of Greece (EFEE) in 1975.

=== Member of Parliament ===
Venizelos was elected as a PASOK MP in the Thessaloniki A constituency in the general elections of 1993, 1996, 2000, 2004, 2007 and 2009. He has been a member of the parliamentary committee for the Revision of the Constitution, on which he was spokesman for the majority party in the parliaments elected in 1993, 1996, 2000, 2004 and 2007. He was also a member of the Standing Committees on National Defence and Foreign Affairs, on Public Administration, Public Order and Justice and on European Affairs.

In parliament, Venizelos sat on the Special Permanent Committee on Institutions and Transparency and on the Special Permanent Committee on monitoring the decisions of the European Court of Human Rights.

In addition to his role in parliament, Venizelos has been serving as member of the Greek delegation to the Parliamentary Assembly of the Council of Europe since 2016. A member of the Socialists, Democrats and Greens Group, he serves on the Committee on Legal Affairs and Human Rights; its Sub-Committee on the implementation of judgments of the European Court of Human Rights; the Committee on Rules of Procedure, Immunities and Institutional Affairs; and Committee on the Election of Judges to the European Court of Human Rights.

He has been a member of the PASOK Central Committee since 1990. In the past he was a member of the PASOK Executive Bureau.

=== Member of the Government ===
Venizelos has held the following government posts:

- Deputy Minister to the Presidency, and government spokesman, 13 October 1993 to 8 July 1994
- Minister for the Press and the Media, and government spokesman, 8 July 1994 to 15 September 1995
- Minister for Transport and Communications, 15 September 1995 to 22 January 1996
- Minister for Justice, 22 January to 5 September 1996
- Minister for Culture, 25 September 1996 to 19 February 1999
- Minister for Development, 19 January 1999 to 13 April 2000
- Minister for Culture, 21 November 2000 to 10 March 2004
- Minister for Finance, 17 June 2011 to 21 March 2012
- Deputy Prime Minister, 17 June 2011 to 21 March 2012
- Deputy Prime Minister and Minister for Foreign Affairs, from 25 June 2013 to 27 January 2015.

After the legislative elections of 2007, in which PASOK was soundly defeated, Venizelos announced his candidacy for the leadership of the party. In the leadership election, held on 11 November 2007, Venizelos was defeated by incumbent party leader George Papandreou, receiving 38.18% of the vote against 55.91% for Papandreou.

When named by Papandreou to the finance and deputy PM positions in June 2011, Venizelos said "'I am leaving defense today to go to the real battle' to reduce Europe's biggest debt load – almost 1 1/2 times the size of its economy." David Marsh of London and Oxford Capital Markets in MarketWatch wrote that both "German parliamentarians who voted solidly earlier this month to involve private-sector creditors in the next bail-out package", which Angela Merkel has now dropped as a precondition, and "Greece's politicians and people, who must bow to further austerity as the price for fresh external support", were central as "the stage now shifts to further players in the theatre of Greek affairs." And "[n]obody knows whether the burly new Finance Minister Evangelos Venizelos will put in a starring role or turn out merely as a transitory figure."

On 1 June 2019 Venizelos left PASOK and KINAL in protest against the political line of the new leader Fofi Gennimata.

== Controversy ==
Venizelos was active in the Macedonia naming dispute, when elements in Greece opposed the use of the name "Macedonia" by the newly independent neighbouring Republic of Macedonia. Columnist Mark Dragoumis of Athens News opined that, "[i]n February 1994, as minister of information, [Venizelos] was instrumental in convincing the ailing Prime Minister Andreas Papandreou to impose that idiotic 'embargo' on the country later named FYROM." Dragoumis maintained that Venizelos' motivation was to gain "nationalist votes in his Thessaloniki constituency".

Dragoumis also criticised Venizelos for helping pass a law – "in order to boost [his] popularity among Greek republicans" – to impose a requirement on King Constantine II, former king of the Hellenes, and his family if they wanted to be granted Greek nationality. The requirement was to submit a declaration that they "unreservedly respected the 1975 Constitution and accepted and recognised the Hellenic Republic". The columnist termed it a "silly precondition – reminiscent of the 'declarations of repentance' that Greek leftists were obliged to sign under pressure during the civil war and after". Ultimately, the law proved irrelevant once Greece signed the Schengen Agreement allowing the ex-king to travel to Greece via Italy without having to pass through Greek immigration.

== Notes ==
Political offices
New office	Minister for the Press and the Media; 1994–1995	Succeeded by Tilemachos Chitiris
Preceded by Athanasios Tsouras	Minister of Transport and Communications; 1995–1996	Succeeded by Haris Kastanidis
Preceded by Ioannis Pottakis	Minister of Justice; 1996	Succeeded by Anargyros Fatouros
Preceded by Stavros Benos	Minister of Culture; 1996–1999	Succeeded by Elisavet Papazoi
Preceded by Vasso Papandreou	Minister of Development; 1999–2000	Succeeded by Nikos Christodoulakis
Preceded by Theodoros Pangalos	Minister of Culture; 2000–2004	Succeeded by Kostas Karamanlis
Preceded by Vangelis Meimarakis	Minister of National Defence; 2009–2011	Succeeded by Panagiotis Beglitis
Preceded by Theodoros Pangalos	Deputy Prime Minister of Greece; 2011–2012; Served alongside: Theodoros Pangalos	Succeeded by Theodoros Pangalos
Preceded by Giorgos Papakonstantinou	Minister of Finance; 2011–2012	Succeeded by Filippos Sachinidis
Vacant Title last held by Theodoros Pangalos	Deputy Prime Minister of Greece; 2013–2015	Succeeded by Yannis Dragasakis
Preceded by Dimitris Avramopoulos	Minister of Foreign Affairs; 2013–2015	Succeeded by Nikos Kotzias
Party political offices
New office	Deputy Leader of the Panhellenic Socialist Movement; 2004–2012	Position abolished
Preceded by George Papandreou	Leader of the Panhellenic Socialist Movement; 2012–2015	Succeeded by Fofi Gennimata
