= First cabinet of Alexis Tsipras =

Greece's Syriza party government (2015)

First Cabinet of Alexis Tsipras
- Cabinet of Greece

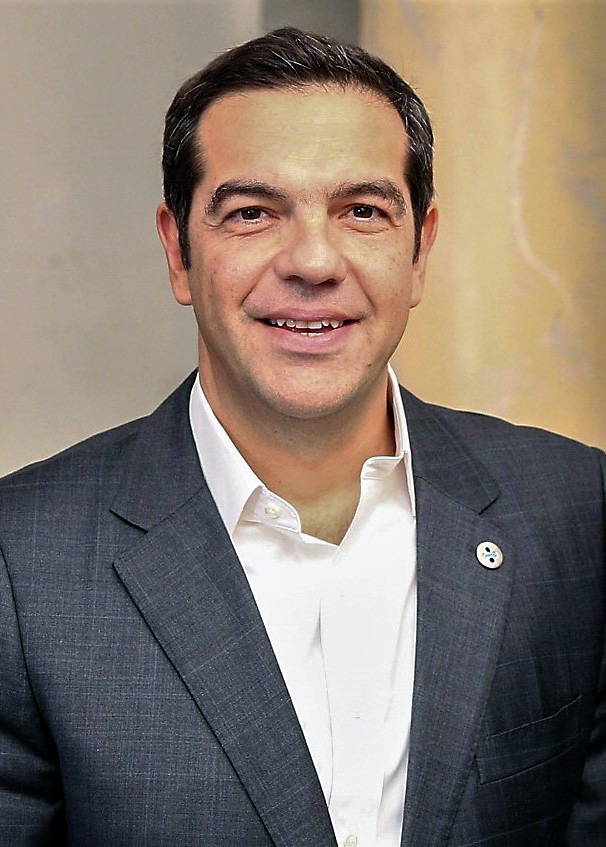
- Alexis Tsipras in 2017
- Date formed: 26 January 2015
- Date dissolved: 27 August 2015

People and organisations
- Head of state: Prokopis Pavlopoulos
- Head of government: Alexis Tsipras
- Deputy head of government: Yannis Dragasakis
- No. of ministers: 13
- Total no. of members: 46
- Member parties: Coalition of the Radical Left (SYRIZA), Independent Greeks (ANEL) (with participation from Ecologist Greens and independents)
- Status in legislature: Coalition government
- Opposition parties: New Democracy; LAE (from 21/08/15); Golden Dawn; To Potami; Communist Party of Greece (KKE); Panhellenic Socialist Movement (PASOK)
- Opposition leader: Antonis Samaras (Until 05/07/15); Vangelis Meimarakis (From 05/07/15)

History
- Election: January 2015 Greek legislative election
- Legislature term: 16th (2015–2015)
- Predecessor: Samaras Cabinet
- Successor: Thanou-Christophilou Caretaker Cabinet

Following his victory in legislative elections held on 25 January 2015, the newly elected prime minister Alexis Tsipras appointed a new cabinet to succeed the cabinet of Antonis Samaras, his predecessor. A significant reshuffle took place on 17 July 2015.

Tsipras resigned as prime minister on 20 August 2015, and after opposition parties failed to form their own government, on 27 August Vassiliki Thanou-Christophilou was appointed as an interim prime minister, and her caretaker cabinet was sworn in on 28 August. Following the subsequent September legislative election, Tsipras was re-appointed as prime minister on 21 September and appointed a second cabinet that was sworn in on 23 September.

== Composition of the cabinet ==
The cabinet is composed of 35 members, alongside 6 deputy ministers. Including the deputy ministers the cabinet comprises 6 females and 35 males. It reflects the majority coalition in Parliament. It is composed of the winning Coalition of the Radical Left (SYRIZA) with the support of the right-wing anti-austerity party, Independent Greeks (ANEL). The Ecologist Greens (OP), which had withdrawn from the election in support of SYRIZA, were given the office of Alternate Minister of Environment and Energy. Finally, some ministers do not belong to any party.

== Oath of office ==
Most members of the cabinet were sworn in on 27 January 2015, with the exception of the new Minister of Justice Nikos Paraskevopoulos, who was sworn in a day later, and the Alternate Ministers Christodoulopoulou, Spirtzis and Fotakis who were sworn in almost two months later.

While most representatives of Syriza chose a civil oath of office, the ANEL representatives as well as Yiannis Panousis, Dimitris Mardas and Panagiotis Nikoloudis chose a religious oath before a representative of the Greek orthodox Archbishop Ieronymos II of Athens.

== Cabinet list ==
=== Prime minister ===
Office	Incumbent	Party	Tenure
**Prime Minister**	**Alexis Tsipras**	SYRIZA	26 January 2015 - 27 August 2015
**Deputy Prime Minister**	**Yannis Dragasakis**	SYRIZA	27 January 2015 - 28 August 2015

=== Government Ministries ===
The number of ministries has been reduced to ten, including four merged ministries:

- The merged Ministry of Interior and Administrative Reconstruction succeeds the ministries of 1) Interior, 2) Administrative Reform and E-Government, 3) Public Order and Citizen Protection, and 4) Macedonia and Thrace.
- The merged Ministry of Economy, Infrastructure, Marine and Tourism succeeds the ministries of 1) Development and Competitiveness, 2) Marine and Aegean, 3) Tourism, and 4) Infrastructure, Transport and Networks.
- The merged Ministry of Productive Reconstruction, Environment and Energy succeeds the ministries of 1) Environment, Energy and Climate Change, 2) Rural Development and Food, and 3) the services of the General Secretariat of the Ministry of Industry Development and Competitiveness.
- The merged Ministry of Culture, Education and Religious Affairs succeeds the ministries of 1) Culture and Sport, and 2) Education.

Alternate Ministers are directly assigned special responsibilities and powers by the prime minister, including:

- full parliamentary powers and, in conjunction with the minister, the legislative initiative
- the right to issue individual and normative acts, and to propose individual and normative decrees

Full ministers however retain:

- the identification of ministerial policy in the cabinet
- the representation in bodies of the European Union
- the appointment of administrative agencies, public services and personnel

Deputy ministers are assigned with responsibilities and powers by the prime minister and the full minister they report to.

Ministry	Office	Incumbent	Party	Tenure
**1.** Ministry of the Interior and Administrative Reconstruction	**Minister of the Interior and Administrative Reconstruction**	**Nikos Voutsis**	SYRIZA	27 January 2015 – 28 August 2015
**1.** Ministry of the Interior and Administrative Reconstruction	Alternate Minister of Administrative Reform	Georgios Katrougalos	SYRIZA	27 January 2015 – 17 July 2015
**1.** Ministry of the Interior and Administrative Reconstruction	Alternate Minister of Administrative Reform	Christophoros Vernardakis	SYRIZA	17 July 2015 – 28 August 2015
**1.** Ministry of the Interior and Administrative Reconstruction	Alternate Minister of Citizen Protection	Giannis Panousis	Independent	27 January 2015 – 28 August 2015
**1.** Ministry of the Interior and Administrative Reconstruction	Alternate Minister of Immigration Policy	Tasia Christodoulopoulou	SYRIZA	21 March 2015 – 28 August 2015
**1.** Ministry of the Interior and Administrative Reconstruction	Deputy Minister for Macedonia and Thrace	Maria Kollia-Tsaroucha^{a}	ANEL	27 January 2015 – 28 August 2015
**1.** Ministry of the Interior and Administrative Reconstruction	Alternate Minister of the Interior and Administrative Reconstruction	Pavlos Polakis	SYRIZA	17 July 2015 – 28 August 2015
**2.** Ministry of Economy, Infrastructure, Shipping and Tourism	**Minister of Economy, Infrastructure, Shipping and Tourism**	**Giorgos Stathakis**	SYRIZA	27 January 2015 – 28 August 2015
**2.** Ministry of Economy, Infrastructure, Shipping and Tourism	Alternate Minister of Infrastructure, Transport and Networks	Christos Spirtzis	SYRIZA	28 January 2015 – 28 August 2015
**2.** Ministry of Economy, Infrastructure, Shipping and Tourism	Alternate Minister of Shipping	Thodoris Dritsas	SYRIZA	27 January 2015 – 28 August 2015
**2.** Ministry of Economy, Infrastructure, Shipping and Tourism	Alternate Minister of Tourism	Elena Kountoura	ANEL	27 January 2015 – 28 August 2015
**3.** Ministry of National Defence	**Minister of National Defence**	**Panos Kammenos**	ANEL	27 January 2015 – 28 August 2015
**3.** Ministry of National Defence	Alternate Minister of National Defence	Kostas Isyhos	SYRIZA	27 January 2015 – 17 July 2015
**3.** Ministry of National Defence	Alternate Minister of National Defence	Dimitris Vitsas	SYRIZA	17 July 2015 – 28 August 2015
**3.** Ministry of National Defence	Deputy Minister of National Defence	Nikos Toskas^{a}	SYRIZA	27 January 2015 – 28 August 2015
**4.** Ministry of Culture, Education and Religious Affairs	**Minister of Culture, Education and Religious Affairs**	**Aristides Baltas**	SYRIZA	27 January 2015 – 28 August 2015
**4.** Ministry of Culture, Education and Religious Affairs	Alternate Minister of Culture	Nikos Xydakis	SYRIZA	27 January 2015 – 28 August 2015
**4.** Ministry of Culture, Education and Religious Affairs	Alternate Minister of Education	Tasos Kourakis	SYRIZA	27 January 2015 – 28 August 2015
**4.** Ministry of Culture, Education and Religious Affairs	Alternate Minister of Research and Innovation	Kostas Fotakis	Independent	21 March 2015 – 28 August 2015
**4.** Ministry of Culture, Education and Religious Affairs	Deputy Minister of Sports	Stavros Kontonis^{a}	SYRIZA	27 January 2015 – 28 August 2015
**5.** Ministry of Productive Reconstruction, Environment and Energy	**Minister of Productive Reconstruction, Environment and Energy**	**Panagiotis Lafazanis**	SYRIZA	27 January 2015 – 17 July 2015
**5.** Ministry of Productive Reconstruction, Environment and Energy	**Minister of Productive Reconstruction, Environment and Energy**	**Panos Skourletis**	SYRIZA	17 July 2015 – 28 August 2015
**5.** Ministry of Productive Reconstruction, Environment and Energy	Alternate Minister of Environment and Energy	Giannis Tsironis	OP	27 January 2015 – 28 August 2015
**5.** Ministry of Productive Reconstruction, Environment and Energy	Alternate Minister of Agricultural Development and Food	Evangelos Apostolou	SYRIZA	27 January 2015 – 28 August 2015
**5.** Ministry of Productive Reconstruction, Environment and Energy	Deputy Minister of Agricultural Development	Panagiotis Sgouridis^{a}	ANEL	27 January 2015 – 28 August 2015
**6.** Ministry of Justice, Transparency and Human Rights	**Minister of Justice, Transparency and Human Rights**	**Nikos Paraskevopoulos**	Independent	28 January 2015 – 28 August 2015
**6.** Ministry of Justice, Transparency and Human Rights	Alternate Minister of Justice, Transparency and Human Rights	Dimitris Papangelopoulos	Independent	17 July 2015 – 28 August 2015
**7.** Ministry of Foreign Affairs	**Minister of Foreign Affairs**	**Nikos Kotzias**	Independent	27 January 2015 – 28 August 2015
**7.** Ministry of Foreign Affairs	Alternate Minister of European Affairs	Nikos Hountis	SYRIZA	27 January 2015 – 13 July 2015
**7.** Ministry of Foreign Affairs	Alternate Minister of European Affairs	Sia Anagnostopoulou	SYRIZA	18 July 2015 – 28 August 2015
**7.** Ministry of Foreign Affairs	Alternate Minister of International Economic Relations	Euclid Tsakalotos	SYRIZA	27 January 2015 – 6 July 2015
**7.** Ministry of Foreign Affairs	Alternate Minister of Foreign Affairs	Ioannis Amanatidis	SYRIZA	17 July 2015 – 28 August 2015
**8.** Ministry of Finance	**Minister of Finance**	**Yanis Varoufakis**	SYRIZA	27 January 2015 – 6 July 2015
**8.** Ministry of Finance	**Minister of Finance**	**Euclid Tsakalotos**	SYRIZA	6 July 2015 – 28 August 2015
**8.** Ministry of Finance	Alternate Minister of Finance	Nadia Valavani	SYRIZA	27 January 2015 – 15 July 2015
**8.** Ministry of Finance	Alternate Minister of Finance	Tryfon Alexiadis	SYRIZA	17 July 2015 – 28 August 2015
**8.** Ministry of Finance	Alternate Minister of Revenue	Dimitris Mardas	Independent	27 January 2015 – 28 August 2015
**9.** Ministry of Labour and Social Solidarity	**Minister of Labour and Social Solidarity**	**Panos Skourletis**	SYRIZA	27 January 2015 – 17 July 2015
**9.** Ministry of Labour and Social Solidarity	**Minister of Labour and Social Solidarity**	**Georgios Katrougalos**	SYRIZA	17 July 2015 – 28 August 2015
**9.** Ministry of Labour and Social Solidarity	Alternate Minister of Social Solidarity	Theano Fotiou	SYRIZA	27 January 2015 – 28 August 2015
**9.** Ministry of Labour and Social Solidarity	Alternate Minister for Combatting Unemployment	Rania Antonopoulou	SYRIZA	27 January 2015 – 28 August 2015
**9.** Ministry of Labour and Social Solidarity	Alternate Minister of Social Security	Dimitris Stratoulis	SYRIZA	21 March 2015 – 17 July 2015
**9.** Ministry of Labour and Social Solidarity	Deputy Minister of Social Security	Pavlos Haikalis	ANEL	18 July 2015 – 28 August 2015
**10.** Ministry of Health and Social Security	**Minister of Health and Social Security**	**Panagiotis Kouroumplis**	SYRIZA	27 January 2015 – 28 August 2015
**10.** Ministry of Health and Social Security	Alternate Minister of Health	Andreas Xanthos	SYRIZA	27 January 2015 – 28 August 2015

=== Ministers of State ===
Rank	Office	Incumbent	Party	In office since
1.	**Minister of State**	**Nikos Pappas**	SYRIZA	27 January 2015 – 28 August 2015
2.	**Minister of State for Coordinating Government Operations**	**Alekos Flambouraris**	SYRIZA	27 January 2015 – 28 August 2015
	Deputy Minister of State for Coordinating Government Operations	Terence Quick^{a}	ANEL	27 January 2015 – 28 August 2015
3.	**Minister of State for Combatting Corruption**	**Panagiotis Nikoloudis**	Independent	27 January 2015 – 23 September 2015
	Deputy Minister to the Prime Minister and Government Spokesperson	Gabriel Sakellaridis^{a}	SYRIZA	27 January 2015 – 17 July 2015
	Deputy Minister to the Prime Minister	Terence Quick^{a}	SYRIZA	17 July 2015 – 28 August 2015
	Deputy Minister to the Prime Minister and Government Spokesperson	Olga Gerovassili	SYRIZA	17 July 2015 – 28 August 2015

Bold denotes full ministers attending the weekly cabinet council.
^{a} Deputy ministers are not members of the cabinet but may attend cabinet meetings.

== Changes ==
=== Resignations ===
Yanis Varoufakis, the Minister of Finance, resigned on 6 July 2015, following the 'No' vote in the Greek bailout referendum. In a blog post on his website, Varoufakis wrote: "Soon after the announcement of the referendum results, I was made aware of a certain preference by some Eurogroup participants, and assorted 'partners', for my... 'absence' from its meetings; an idea that the prime minister judged to be potentially helpful to him in reaching an agreement. For this reason I am leaving the Ministry of Finance today." Varoufakis was succeeded as Minister of Finance by Euclid Tsakalotos. Tsakalotos in turn left his role as Alternate Minister of International Economic Affairs, leaving the position vacant.

Nikolaos Chountis, the Alternate Minister of European Affairs, resigned on 13 July 2015, three days before the debate on the first round of measures in the tenth austerity package began in the Hellenic Parliament. He also resigned from his parliamentary seat. Chountis subsequently took up the post of Member of the European Parliament for Greece, following Manolis Glezos's resignation. Chountis was replaced as Alternate Minister of European Affairs by Sia Anagnostopoulou, as part of the 17 July cabinet reshuffle.

Nadia Valavani, the Alternate Minister of Finance, resigned on 15 July 2015, the day before the vote on the first round of measures in the tenth austerity package were debated in the Hellenic Parliament. Valavani was succeeded in her role by Tryfon Alexiadis on 17 July, as part of the cabinet reshuffle.

=== 17 July 2015 cabinet reshuffle ===
Following a number of cabinet members voting against the government on the first set of measures in the tenth austerity package on 16 July 2015, Alexis Tsipras reshuffled his cabinet. The reshuffle took place on 17 July, and the new ministers were sworn in on 18 July. The most notable move was to remove Panagiotis Lafazanis from his ministerial role.

Cabinet members that were removed from cabinet:

- Panagiotis Lafazanis, the Minister of Productive Reconstruction, Environment and Energy
- Kostas Isyhos, the Alternate Minister of National Defence
- Dimitris Stratoulis, the Alternate Minister of Social Security

Existing cabinet members that took on new roles:

- Panos Skourletis, the Minister of Labour and Social Solidarity, became the Minister of Productive Reconstruction, Environment and Energy
- Georgios Katrougalos, the Alternate Minister of Administrative Reform, became the Minister of Labour and Social Solidarity
- Gabriel Sakellaridis, the Deputy Minister to the Prime Minister and Government Spokesperson, became a Parliamentary Spokesperson
- Olga Gerovasili, a Parliamentary Spokesperson, became the Deputy Minister to the Prime Minister and Government Spokesperson

New cabinet members:

- Christophoros Vernardakis became the Alternate Minister of Administrative Reform
- Tryfon Alexiadis became the Alternate Minister of Finance
- Dimitris Vitsas became the Alternate Minister of National Defence
- Pavlos Haikalis became the Deputy Minister of Social Security
- Pavlos Polakis became an Alternate Minister of Interior and Administrative Reconstruction
- Sia Anagnostopoulou became the Alternate Minister of European Affairs
- Giannis Amanatidis became an Alternate Foreign Minister

Along with ministerial changes, a special committee to combat corruption was also proposed by the Prime Minister, to be headed by the Minister of State for Combatting Corruption Panagiotis Nikoloudis. The committee would consist of Tryfon Alexiadis, Pavlos Polakis, Dimitris Papagelopoulos and Terence Quick.

Newly appointed Minister of Productive Reconstruction, Environment and Energy Panos Skourletis described the reshuffle as an "adjustment by the government to a new reality".
