= Second cabinet of Alexis Tsipras =

Government of Greece (2015–2019)

Second Cabinet of Alexis Tsipras
- Cabinet of Greece

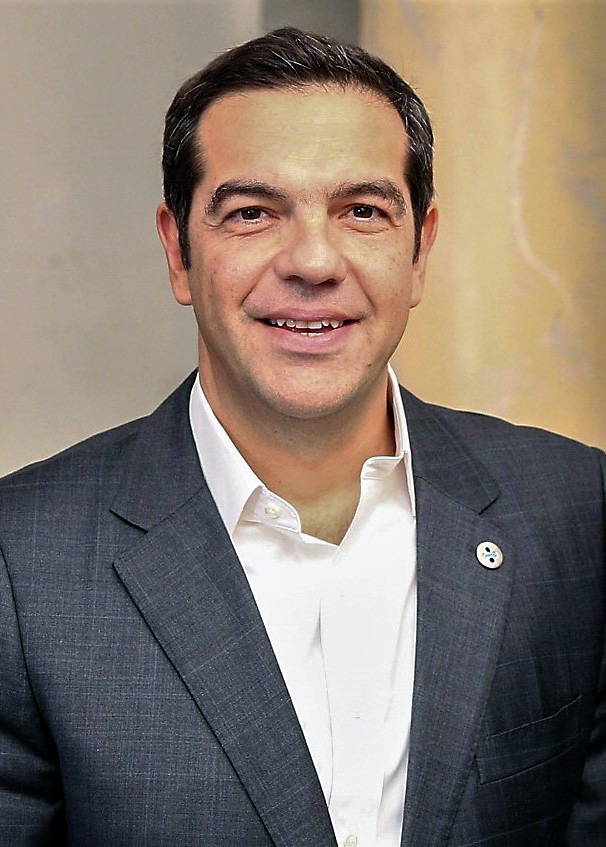
- Alexis Tsipras in 2017
- Date formed: 21 September 2015
- Date dissolved: 8 July 2019

People and organisations
- Head of state: Prokopis Pavlopoulos
- Head of government: Alexis Tsipras
- Deputy head of government: Yannis Dragasakis
- No. of ministers: 15
- Total no. of members: 45
- Member parties: Syriza; ANEL with participation from the Ecologist Greens (Until 14/01/19); Syriza with participation from the Ecologist Greens and Independents (from 14/01/19)
- Status in legislature: Coalition government (until 14/01/19); Minority government (from 14/01/19)
- Opposition parties: New Democracy; Democratic Alignment; Golden Dawn; Communist Party of Greece (KKE); Union of Centrists (until 30/05/2019); The River; Independent Greeks (until 08/02/19)
- Opposition leader: Vangelis Meimarakis (until 24/11/15); Ioannis Plakiotakis (24/11/15 – 10/01/16); Kyriakos Mitsotakis (from 10/01/16)

History
- Election: September 2015 Greek legislative election
- Legislature term: 17th (2015–2019)
- Predecessor: Thanou-Christophilou (caretaker)
- Successor: Mitsotakis I

The Second Cabinet of Alexis Tsipras was sworn in on 23 September 2015, following the Greek legislative election in September 2015. Alexis Tsipras, leader of Syriza, was sworn in as Prime Minister of Greece on 21 September, having agreed to re-form the coalition with Panos Kammenos and the Independent Greeks.

On 16 June 2018 the Hellenic Parliament rejected a motion of no confidence against the government with a 127–153 vote.

== Background ==
The First Cabinet of Alexis Tsipras was formed following the legislative election in January 2015, and was a coalition of Syriza and the Independent Greeks. Most notably, the government had to deal with the Greek government-debt crisis, but was also responsible for the early July bailout referendum. Throughout the duration of their term, their main responsibility was re-negotiating the terms of the third bailout package.

During the vote on the third bailout package in the Hellenic Parliament, a number of Syriza MPs voted against the package resulting in the government officially losing its majority. For this reason, Tsipras and the government resigned on 20 August and called for a snap election to take place on 20 September. Prokopis Pavlopoulos, the President of Greece had to allow for all the opposition parties to attempt to form a government of their own, but none of them had sufficient numbers of MPs. Subsequently, a caretaker cabinet led by Vassiliki Thanou-Christophilou was formed on 27 August to lead the country into the election.

During the election campaign period, opinion polls had suggested that Syriza and New Democracy, led by Vangelis Meimarakis, were neck and neck, with some polls showing New Democracy ahead and others showing Syriza ahead. The exit polls generally showed that Syriza was on 30–34%, and New Democracy was on 28.5–32.5%.

== Formation ==
At approximately 12:00 GMT on 21 September, Tsipras met with Panos Kammenos, his former coalition partner, at the Syriza party HQ in Athens. At the meeting, they discussed the make-up of the new cabinet.

== Composition ==
=== Prime minister ===
Office	Incumbent	Party	In office since
**Prime Minister**	**Alexis Tsipras**	Syriza	21 September 2015
**Deputy Prime Minister**	Yannis Dragasakis	Syriza	23 September 2015

=== Ministerial responsibilities ===
Alternate Ministers are directly assigned special responsibilities and powers by the prime minister, including:

- full parliamentary powers and, in conjunction with the minister, the legislative initiative
- the right to issue individual and normative acts, and to propose individual and normative decrees

Full ministers however retain:

- the identification of ministerial policy in the cabinet
- the representation in bodies of the European Union
- the appointment of administrative agencies, public services and personnel

Deputy ministers are assigned with responsibilities and powers by the prime minister and the full minister they report to.

Ministry	Office	Incumbent	Party	In office since
**1.** Ministry of the Interior and Administrative Reconstruction	**Minister of the Interior and Administrative Reconstruction**	**Panagiotis Kouroumblis**	Syriza	23 September 2015
**1.** Ministry of the Interior and Administrative Reconstruction	Deputy Minister of the Interior and Administrative Reconstruction	Yannis Balafas^{a}	Syriza	23 September 2015
**1.** Ministry of the Interior and Administrative Reconstruction	Alternate Minister of Administrative Reform	Christoforos Vernardakis	Syriza	23 September 2015
**1.** Ministry of the Interior and Administrative Reconstruction	Alternate Minister of Citizen Protection	Nikos Toskas	Syriza	23 September 2015 – 3 August 2018
**1.** Ministry of the Interior and Administrative Reconstruction	Alternate Minister of Immigration Policy	Ioannis Mouzalas	Independent	28 August 2015
**1.** Ministry of the Interior and Administrative Reconstruction	Deputy Minister for Macedonia and Thrace	Maria Kollia-Tsaroucha^{a}	ANEL	23 September 2015 – 29 August 2018
**2.** Ministry of Economy, Development and Tourism	**Minister of Economy, Development and Tourism**	**Giorgos Stathakis**	Syriza	23 September 2015
**2.** Ministry of Economy, Development and Tourism	Alternate Minister of Tourism	Elena Kountoura	Independent	23 September 2015
**2.** Ministry of Economy, Development and Tourism	Deputy Minister of National Strategic Reference Framework Issues	Alexis Charitsis^{a}	Syriza	23 September 2015
**2.** Ministry of Economy, Development and Tourism	Deputy Minister of Industry	Theodora Tzagri^{a}	Syriza	23 September 2015
**3.** Ministry of National Defence	**Minister of National Defence**	**Evangelos Apostolakis**	Military	13 January 2019
**3.** Ministry of National Defence	Alternate Minister of National Defence	Dimitris Vitsas	Syriza	23 September 2015
**4.** Ministry of Education, Research and Religious Affairs	**Minister of Education, Research and Religious Affairs**	**Nikos Filis**	Syriza	23 September 2015 – 5 November 2016
**4.** Ministry of Education, Research and Religious Affairs	Alternate Minister of Education, Research and Religious Affairs	Sia Anagnostopoulou	Syriza	23 September 2015
**4.** Ministry of Education, Research and Religious Affairs	Alternate Minister of Research and Innovation	Kostas Fotakis	Independent	23 September 2015
**4.** Ministry of Education, Research and Religious Affairs	Deputy Minister of Education, Research and Religious Affairs	Theodosis Pelegrinis	Syriza	23 September 2015
**5.** Ministry of Environment and Energy	**Minister of Environment and Energy**	**Panos Skourletis**	Syriza	23 September 2015
**5.** Ministry of Environment and Energy	Alternate Minister of Environment and Energy	Giannis Tsironis	OP	23 September 2015
**6.** Ministry of Justice, Transparency and Human Rights	**Minister of Justice, Transparency and Human Rights**	**Nikos Paraskevopoulos**	Syriza	23 September 2015
**6.** Ministry of Justice, Transparency and Human Rights	Alternate Minister of Corruption Issues	Dimitris Papangelopoulos	Independent	23 September 2015
**7.** Ministry of Foreign Affairs	**Minister of Foreign Affairs**	**Nikos Kotzias**	Syriza	23 September 2015 – 17 October 2018
**7.** Ministry of Foreign Affairs	Alternate Minister of European Affairs	Nikos Xydakis	Syriza	23 September 2015
**7.** Ministry of Foreign Affairs	Deputy Minister of Foreign Affairs	Ioannis Amanatidis^{a}	Syriza	23 September 2015
**7.** Ministry of Foreign Affairs	Deputy Minister of Foreign Affairs	Dimitris Mardas^{a}	Syriza	23 September 2015
**8.** Ministry of Finance	**Minister of Finance**	**Euclid Tsakalotos**	Syriza	23 September 2015
**8.** Ministry of Finance	Alternate Minister of Finance	Tryfon Alexiadis	Syriza	18 July 2015
**8.** Ministry of Finance	Alternate Minister of Finance	Giorgos Houliarakis	Independent	23 September 2015
**9.** Ministry of Labour, Social Insurance and Social Solidarity	**Minister of Labour, Social Insurance and Social Solidarity**	**Georgios Katrougalos**	Syriza	23 September 2015
**9.** Ministry of Labour, Social Insurance and Social Solidarity	Alternate Minister of Social Solidarity	Theano Fotiou	Syriza	23 September 2015
**9.** Ministry of Labour, Social Insurance and Social Solidarity	Alternate Minister for Combatting Unemployment	Rania Antonopoulou	Syriza	23 September 2015 – 26 Febr 2018
**9.** Ministry of Labour, Social Insurance and Social Solidarity	Deputy Minister of Social Insurance Issues	Anastasios Petropoulos^{a}	Syriza	23 September 2015
**10.** Ministry of Health	**Minister of Health**	**Andreas Xanthos**	Syriza	23 September 2015
**10.** Ministry of Health	Alternate Minister of Health	Pavlos Polakis	Syriza	23 September 2015
**11.** Ministry of Infrastructure, Transport and Networks	**Minister of Infrastructure, Transport and Networks**	**Christos Spirtzis**	Independent	23 September 2015
**11.** Ministry of Infrastructure, Transport and Networks	Deputy Minister of Infrastructure, Transport and Networks	Dimitris Kammenos^{a}	ANEL	23 September 2015 – 23 September 2015
**11.** Ministry of Infrastructure, Transport and Networks	Deputy Minister of Infrastructure, Transport and Networks	Panagiotis Sgouridis^{a}	ANEL	24 September 2015 – 23 February 2016
**11.** Ministry of Infrastructure, Transport and Networks	Deputy Minister of Infrastructure, Transport and Networks	Marina Chrissoveloni^{a}	ANEL	24 February 2016
**12.** Ministry of Maritime Affairs and Insular Policy	**Minister of Maritime Affairs and Insular Policy**	**Thodoris Dritsas**	Syriza	23 September 2015
**13.** Ministry of Agricultural Development and Food	**Minister of Agricultural Development and Food**	**Evangelos Apostolou**	Syriza	23 September 2015
**13.** Ministry of Agricultural Development and Food	Alternate Minister of Agricultural Development and Food	Markos Bolaris	Syriza	23 September 2015
**14.** Ministry of Culture and Sports	**Minister of Culture and Sports**	**Aristides Baltas**	Syriza	23 September 2015
**14.** Ministry of Culture and Sports	Deputy Minister of Sports	Stavros Kontonis	Syriza	23 September 2015 – 29 August 2018

=== Ministers of State ===
Rank	Office	Incumbent	Party	In office since
1.	**Minister of State**	**Nikos Pappas**	Syriza	23 September 2015
2.	**Minister of State for Coordinating Government Operations**	**Alekos Flambouraris**	Syriza	23 September 2015
	Deputy Minister to the Prime Minister	Terence Quick^{a}	ANEL	23 September 2015 – 4 November 2016
	Deputy Minister to the Prime Minister and Government Spokesperson	Dr Olga Gerovassili	Syriza	23 September 2015

Bold denotes full ministers attending the weekly cabinet council.
^{a} Deputy ministers are not members of the cabinet but may attend cabinet meetings.
