= Dimitrios Stamatis (politician) =

Greek politician (1950–2025)

- Δημήτρης Σταμάτης

Minister of State
- In office 21 June 2012 – 26 January 2015
- Prime Minister: Antonis Samaras
- Preceded by: Antonios Argyros
- Succeeded by: Nikos Pappas; Alekos Flambouraris; Panagiotis Nikoloudis

Member of the Hellenic Parliament for Thessaloniki A
- In office 25 January 2015 – 11 June 2019
- In office 3 June 1985 – 10 September 1993

Personal details
- Born: 25 January 1950 Thessaloniki, Greece
- Died: 16 November 2025 (aged 75) Thessaloniki, Greece
- Party: ND
- Education: Aristotle University of Thessaloniki
- Occupation: Lawyer

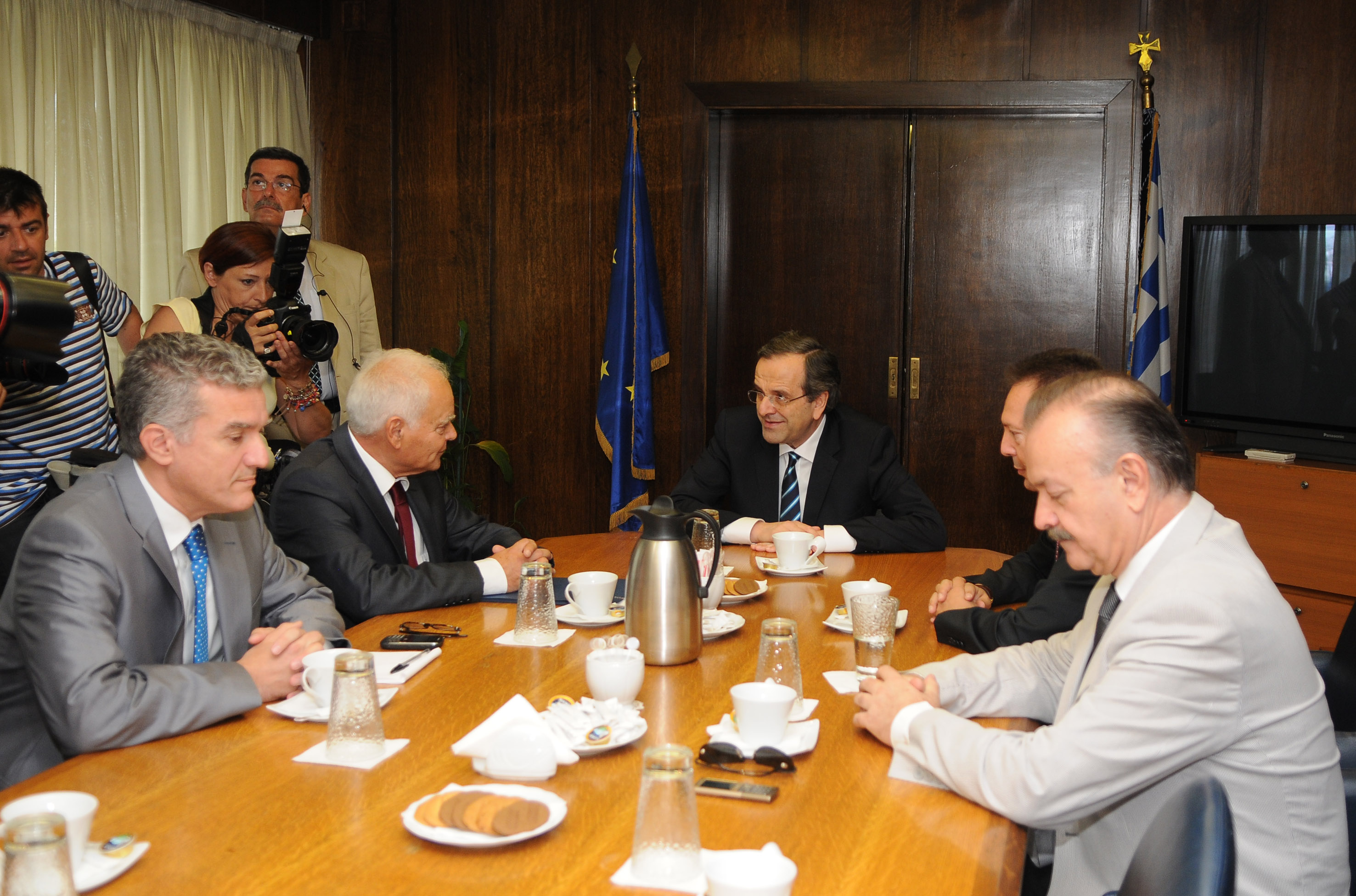
Antonis Samaras’ visit to the Ministry of Administrative Reform. Stamatis is on the far right.

Dimitrios Stamatis (Greek: Δημήτρης Σταμάτης; 25 January 1950 – 16 November 2025) was a Greek politician of New Democracy (ND).

From 1985 to 1993, and again from 2015 to 2019, he served as a member of the Hellenic Parliament for Thessaloniki A. He was also a Minister of State from 2012 to 2015.

Stamatis died of cancer in Thessaloniki, on 16 November 2025, at the age of 75.
