= Nadia Valavani =

Greek politician and economist

Olga-Nadia Valavani
- Όλγα-Νάντια Βαλαβάνη

Alternate Minister of Finance
- In office 27 January – 15 July 2015
- Prime Minister: Alexis Tsipras
- Preceded by: Christos Staikouras
- Succeeded by: Tryfon Alexiadis

Member of the Hellenic Parliament for Athens B
- In office 6 May 2012 – 20 September 2015

Personal details
- Born: 16 August 1954 (age 72) Heraklion, Crete, Greece
- Party: Popular Unity (since 2015)
- Other political affiliations: KKE (1974–1989); Syriza (2007–2015)
- Spouse: Dimos Tsaknias (deceased)
- Parent: George Valavanis (father)
- Education: Athens University of Economics and Business
- Occupation: Translator, hotel director

Olga-Nadia Valavani (Greek: Όλγα-Νάντια Βαλαβάνη; born 16 August 1954) is a Greek politician and economist. She was appointed to the role of Alternate Minister of Finance in the cabinet of Alexis Tsipras on 27 January 2015. She resigned from this role on 15 July 2015, before a significant vote on the terms of a bailout package in the Hellenic Parliament.

She had been a Syriza Member of the Hellenic Parliament since May 2012, but defected to Popular Unity in September 2015.

== Early life and education ==
Valavani was a student in Iraklio during the Greek military junta, and engaged in anti-regime activities under the auspices of the then-outlawed Communist Youth of Greece (KNE) and Communist Party of Greece (KKE), for which she was imprisoned in various facilities, including a five-month stretch in solitary confinement. In July 1974 after the end of the dictatorship, she was released from Korydallos Prison, whereupon she returned to her studies. Valavani is a graduate of the Athens University of Economics and Business.

== Professional career ==
Valavani worked in an insurance company for 29 years, and from 1996 to 2005 was the director of a hotel in Crete.

== Political career ==
Valavani took part in the activities of KKE and KNE during the generally more tolerant political atmosphere following the regime change, which allowed her to travel widely throughout Europe and to the United States. She left the KKE in 1989, disagreeing with its decision to serve in the unity government of Tzannis Tzannetakis.

In 2007 she was invited to join the Syriza, and helped organize its activities in Crete. In 2009, she contested Athens B for Syriza and lost in a difficult election, afterwards devoting herself to campaigning for Syriza, working as a canvasser, author of pamphlets, and organizing rallies while engaging in dialogue with other leftist groups and writing opinion pieces for various left and centre-left newspapers.

Valavani was first elected to the Hellenic Parliament representing Athens B for Syriza in May 2012; she was re-elected in June 2012 and again in the January 2015 election.

Following the election of a Syriza-ANEL coalition on 25 January 2015, Valavani was appointed to the role of Alternate Minister of Finance within the Cabinet of Alexis Tsipras on 27 January. She is one of two Alternate Ministers in the Ministry of Finance (Greece), the other being Dimitris Mardas. She was responsible for taxation and overseeing privatisation.

On 15 July 2015, Valavani resigned from her role as Alternate Minister of Finance in the Greek government, shortly before an important vote on a bailout package. In her resignation letter to Alexis Tsipras, she wrote that the "agreement is a tombstone" and that it was a "humiliation of government and country".

In September 2015, Valavani left Syriza and joined the Syriza split-away party, Popular Unity, alongside Zoi Konstantopoulou. During the September 2015 legislative election, Yanis Varoufakis, former Minister of Finance who Valavani worked under for several months, announced that he would be voting for Popular Unity and in particular supporting Valavani and Kostas Isychos in Athens B.

== Personal life ==
In 1975, she married labour lawyer Dimos Tsaknias, with whom she had two children, a son and a daughter. Tsaknias, like his wife a Syriza (and former Communist) politician, died on 2 November 2014.

On 8 March 2015 Valavani was admitted to an Athens hospital suffering the symptoms of pneumonia apparently brought on from stress.

== See also ==
- First Cabinet of Alexis Tsipras
