= Caretaker Cabinet of Vassiliki Thanou-Christophilou =

Caretaker cabinet of Greece in 2015

- Cabinet of Greece

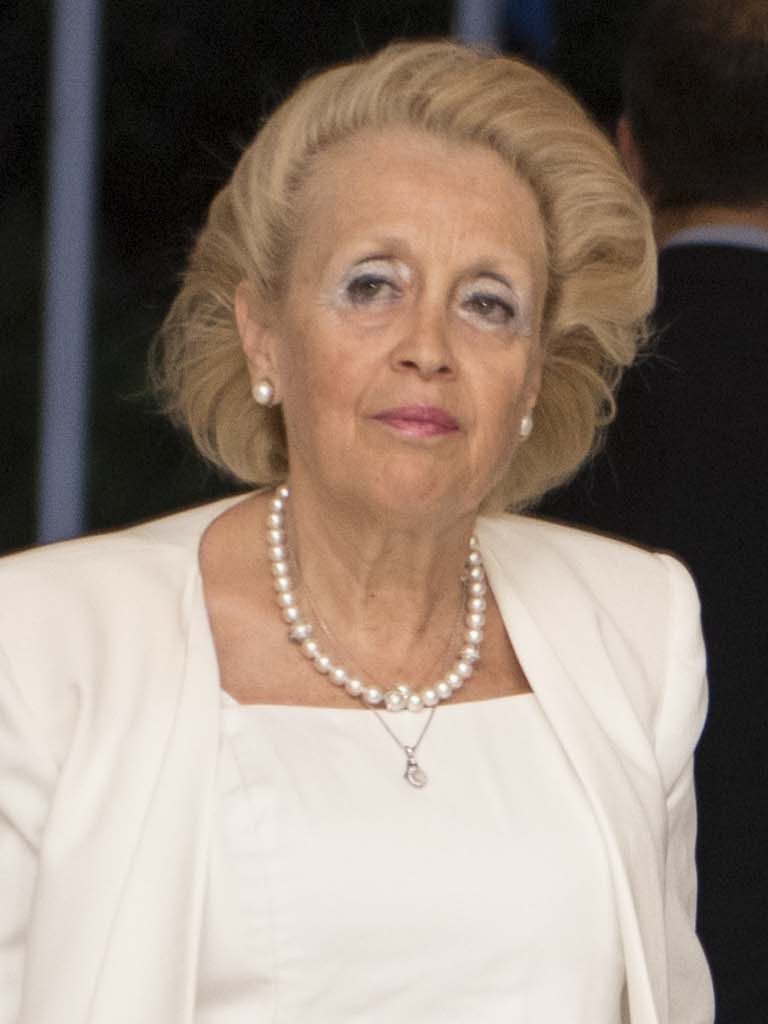
- Vassiliki Thanou-Christophilou in 2015
- Date formed: 27 August 2015
- Date dissolved: 21 September 2015

People and organisations
- Head of state: Prokopis Pavlopoulos
- Head of government: Vassiliki Thanou-Christophilou
- No. of ministers: 22
- Member parties: Independents and others
- Status in legislature: Technocratic caretaker government
- Opposition parties: None (caretaker cabinets in Greece have no formal opposition)

History
- Legislature term: 16th (2015–2015)
- Predecessor: Tsipras I
- Successor: Tsipras II

The Caretaker Cabinet of Vassiliki Thanou-Christophilou was formed following the resignation of the Syriza-ANEL coalition government on 20 August 2015, and the failure of opposition parties to form their own government. The cabinet was headed by Thanou-Christophilou, the President of the Court of Cassation, who was sworn in as prime minister on 27 August 2015, and the rest of the cabinet were sworn in the next day on 28 August. The cabinet remained in office until the completion of the legislative election on 20 September 2015.

== Background ==
On 20 August 2015, Prime Minister Alexis Tsipras, who was leading a Syriza-ANEL coalition government, resigned following a rebellion by party members on a key vote related to the third bailout package. Tsipras said that he needed a stronger mandate in order to implement the bailout package, and so called for a snap legislative election to take place in September.

According to the Greek constitution, the President of Greece could not just call an election, but had to consult all the major parties in turn to see if they could form their own government, described by The Guardian at the time as "a near impossibility given the current makeup of the parliament." On 27 August, the President, Prokopis Pavlopoulos, informed the party leaders that there was no chance of a coalition government being formed by the existing parliament.

That evening, Vassiliki Thanou-Christophilou was sworn in as the caretaker Prime Minister of Greece. On 28 August, the rest of the caretaker cabinet were sworn in at the Presidential Mansion. Later that day, Pavlopoulos signed a degree for the snap election, setting the date at 20 September. Also, the caretaker cabinet had their first meeting where they agreed to work towards an "impeccable" election.

== Appointments ==
George Chouliarakis, an academic economist who had been part of the Greek negotiating team during the talks surrounding the third bailout package, was appointed as Minister of Finance. Petros Molyviatis, a "veteran diplomat", was appointed as Minister of Foreign Affairs, a role he had held in 2012 and from 2004 to 2006. Alkistis Protopsalti, a singer, was appointed as the Alternate Minister of Tourism.

== Composition ==
The cabinet was composed of ten full ministers, nine alternate ministers, one deputy minister and two Ministers of State, for a total of 22 members. This would become 23 members if the Government Spokesman, Rodolfos Moronis, was included. 20 members of the cabinet (including Moronis) were male; 3 were female.

Only two members of the First Cabinet of Alexis Tsipras remained in the same roles, Panagiotis Nikoloudis as Minister of State for Combatting Corruption and Tryfon Alexiadis as Alternate Minister of Finance. Dimitris Papangelopoulos had formerly served in Tsipras's cabinet as a Deputy Minister for Justice, but served as the Minister of Justice, Transparency and Human Rights in the Caretaker Cabinet.

== Cabinet list ==
=== Prime minister ===
Office	Incumbent	Party	Tenure
**Prime Minister**	**Vassiliki Thanou-Christophilou**	Independent	27 August 2015 – 21 September 2015

=== Cabinet ===
Ministry	Office	Incumbent	Party	Tenure
**1.** Ministry of the Interior and Administrative Reconstruction	**Minister of the Interior and Administrative Reconstruction**	Professor **Antonis Manitakis**	Independent	28 August 2015 – 23 September 2015
**1.** Ministry of the Interior and Administrative Reconstruction	Alternate Minister of Citizen Protection	Antonis Makrodimitris	Independent	28 August 2015 – 23 September 2015
**1.** Ministry of the Interior and Administrative Reconstruction	Alternate Minister of Immigration Policy	Ioannis Mouzalas	Independent	28 August 2015 – 23 September 2015
**1.** Ministry of the Interior and Administrative Reconstruction	Deputy Minister for Macedonia and Thrace	Filippos Tsalidis^{a}	Independent	28 August 2015 – 23 September 2015
**2.** Ministry of Economy, Infrastructure, Shipping and Tourism	**Minister of Economy, Infrastructure, Shipping and Tourism**	Professor **Nikos Christodoulakis**	Independent	28 August 2015 – 23 September 2015
**2.** Ministry of Economy, Infrastructure, Shipping and Tourism	Alternate Minister of Shipping	Christos Zois	NEA MERA	28 August 2015 – 23 September 2015
**2.** Ministry of Economy, Infrastructure, Shipping and Tourism	Alternate Minister of Tourism	Alkistis Protopsalti	Independent	28 August 2015 – 23 September 2015
**3.** Ministry of National Defence	**Minister of National Defence**	Air Chief Marshal **Ioannis Giangos**	Independent	28 August 2015 – 23 September 2015
**4.** Ministry of Culture, Education and Religious Affairs	**Minister of Culture, Education and Religious Affairs**	**Frosso Kiaou**	Independent	28 August 2015 – 23 September 2015
**4.** Ministry of Culture, Education and Religious Affairs	Alternate Minister of Culture	Marina Lambraki-Plaka	Independent	28 August 2015 – 23 September 2015
**5.** Ministry of Productive Reconstruction, Environment and Energy	**Minister of Productive Reconstruction, Environment and Energy**	Professor **Ioannis Golias**	Independent	28 August 2015 – 23 September 2015
**5.** Ministry of Productive Reconstruction, Environment and Energy	Alternate Minister of Environment and Energy	Constantinos Mousouroulis	New Democracy	28 August 2015 – 23 September 2015
**5.** Ministry of Productive Reconstruction, Environment and Energy	Alternate Minister of Agricultural Development and Food	Dimitrios Melas	Independent	28 August 2015 – 23 September 2015
**6.** Ministry of Justice, Transparency and Human Rights	**Minister of Justice, Transparency and Human Rights**	**Dimitris Papangelopoulos**	Independent	28 August 2015 – 23 September 2015
**7.** Ministry of Foreign Affairs	**Minister of Foreign Affairs**	**Petros Molyviatis**	New Democracy	28 August 2015 – 23 September 2015
**7.** Ministry of Foreign Affairs	Alternate Minister of European Affairs	Professor Spyridon Flogaitis	Independent	28 August 2015 – 23 September 2015
**8.** Ministry of Finance	**Minister of Finance**	**Giorgos Houliarakis**	Independent	28 August 2015 – 23 September 2015
**8.** Ministry of Finance	Alternate Minister of Finance	Tryfon Alexiadis	SYRIZA	18 July 2015 – 23 September 2015
**9.** Ministry of Labour and Social Solidarity	**Minister of Labour and Social Solidarity**	**Dimitris Moustakas**	Independent	28 August 2015 – 23 September 2015
**10.** Ministry of Health and Social Security	**Minister of Health and Social Security**	**Athanasios Dimopoulos**	Independent	28 August 2015 – 23 September 2015

=== Ministers of State ===
Rank	Office	Incumbent	Party	In office since
1.	**Minister of State**	**Eleftherios Papageorgopoulos**	Independent	28 August 2015 – 23 September 2015
2.	**Minister of State for Combatting Corruption**	**Panagiotis Nikoloudis**	Independent	27 January 2015 – 23 September 2015
	Government Spokesperson	Rodolfos Moronis	Independent	28 August 2015 – 23 September 2015

Bold denotes full ministers attending the weekly cabinet council.
^{a} Deputy ministers are not members of the cabinet but may attend cabinet meetings.
