= Alexiadis =

Alexiadis (Greek: Αλεξιάδης) is a Greek surname. Notable people with the surname include:

- Alekos Alexiadis (born 1945), Greek footballer
- Tryfon Alexiadis (born 1960), Greek politician and tax collector
