= 2015 Greek parliamentary election =

The term 2015 Greek parliamentary election may refer to:

- January 2015 Greek parliamentary election
- September 2015 Greek parliamentary election
