= Nikoloudis =

Nikoloudis (Greek: Νικολούδης) is a Greek surname. It is the surname of:

- Panagiotis Nikoloudis (born 1949), Greek independent politician and Transparency Minister of Greece.
- Takis Nikoloudis (born 1951), Greece national team footballer.
