= Tryfon Alexiadis =

Greek politician and tax collector

Tryfon Alexiadis Τρύφων Αλεξιάδης

Alternate Minister of Finance
- Incumbent
- Assumed office 17 July 2015
- President: Prokopis Pavlopoulos
- Prime Minister: Alexis Tsipras; Vassiliki Thanou-Christophilou; Alexis Tsipras
- Preceded by: Nadia Valavani

Personal details
- Born: 1960 (age 65–66) Kavala, Greece
- Party: Syriza
- Spouse: Sophia Giannou
- Website: www.alexiadistrifon.blogspot.com

Tryfon Alexiadis (Greek: Τρύφων Αλεξιάδης; born 1960) is a Greek politician and tax collector. He is currently an Alternate Minister of Finance in the second Tsipras cabinet, having succeeded Nadia Valavani on 17 July 2015, and served continuously during the first Tsipras cabinet and the Vassiliki Thanou-Christophilou caretaker cabinet.

== Early life ==
Alexiadis was born in 1960 in Kavala. His parents were teachers.

== Professional career ==
Alexiadis worked in the accounting departments of large companies until he joined the Ministry of Finance in 1987. He was a member of the Central Council of the Economic Chamber of Greece and served as Vice President of the Occupational Insurance Fund of the Treasury for ten years.

== Political career ==
Alexiadis was the vice president of the Greek tax collector's union, POE-DOY. He was quoted in this capacity by several newspapers, including the New York Times in 2013 and The Guardian in February 2015. The Guardian also described him as "close to Tsipras’s Syriza party".

In a cabinet reshuffle on 17 July, Prime Minister Alexis Tsipras appointed Alexiadis as an Alternate Minister of Finance, replacing Nadia Valavani who had resigned on 15 July. The Guardian noted that Alexiadis "had better hit the ground running" as a critical bailout vote was due later that week. Alexiadis was also appointed to a new committee aimed at tackling corruption, headed by Panagiotis Nikoloudis, which met for the first time on 20 July 2015.

Alexiadis, in an August 2015 interview with L'Echo, described tax collection in Greece as "complex" and said that he would be judged by his ability to collect taxes. Asked why tax collection seemed so hard, Alexiadis pointed at a lack of political will to make the system work combined with interventions from politicians and other officials. Responding to recent attacks on tax collectors on Rhodes, Alexiadis said: "These reactions are the start of fascism. Citizens cannot attack officials for doing their job.”

In October 2015, Alexiadis received a letter in the post with a bullet in it and a note comparing him to a collaborator with the Axis forces that occupied Greece in the Second World War. The letter read: "Until the hour 0, you and your family will know what fear means," and was signed by group called Kokkini Fraxia, or Red Faction. Alexiadis described those who sent the letter as "fascist psychopaths" and the Greek police said that they were investigating the threat.

In November 2015, Germany handed the Greek authorities a list of 10,000 Greeks accused of tax dodging via Switzerland, with the total value of the accounts coming to €3.6 billion. Responding to the list, Alexiadis said: "It will not stay in a drawer for three years. The list will be evaluated... and we will see what is hidden behind it. All the services of the ministry of finance and the ministry of justice will cooperate so that we have results as soon as possible.”

== Personal life ==
Alexiadis is married to Sophia Giannou and they have two daughters, Katerina and Evdokia.
