= Alekos Flambouraris =

Greek politician (1938–2025)

Alekos Flambouraris (Greek: Αλέκος Φλαμπουράρης; 23 October 1938 – 18 November 2025) was a Greek politician who served as the Minister of State for Coordinating Government Operations in the second Tsipras cabinet.

== Life and career ==
Flambouraris was born in Athens on 23 October 1938. He "helped guide Mr Tsipras’ rise from student politician to prime minister," according to the Financial Times. Following the January 2015 legislative election, he was appointed Minister of State for Coordinating Government Operations.

In the campaign for the September 2015 legislative election, Flambouraris was embroiled in a scandal surrounding his business interests. It was alleged by Greek news website, Proto Thema, that Flambouraris had maintained a majority shareholding in a technical services company, Diatmisi, in defiance of regulations banning cabinet members from owning or operating a business. Flambouraris denied any wrongdoing, but the scandal led to significant angst within Syriza. Dimitris Mardas said that "Ministers shouldn’t be involved in public sector deals... It’s an ethical issue."

He was re-elected in the September 2015 legislative election, and was re-appointed in the second Tsipras cabinet.

Flambouraris died in Athens on 18 November 2025, at the age of 87.
