= Stefanos Manikas =

Greek politician

Stefanos Manikas (14 April 1952 – 26 August 2015) was a Greek politician of the Panhellenic Socialist Movement (PASOK) who was Minister of State. He died on 26 August 2015, at the age of 63, from cancer.
