= Popular Unity (Greece) =

Popular Unity Λαϊκή Ενότητα – Ανυπότακτη Αριστερά
- Abbreviation: ΛΑΕ-ΑΑ (LAE-AA); ΛΑΕ (LAE)
- Leaders: Dimitris Stratoulis, Marianna Tsixli
- Founded: 21 August 2015
- Split from: SYRIZA
- Ideology: Socialism; Euroscepticism
- Political position: Left-wing to far-left
- Colours: Red
- Hellenic Parliament: 0 / 300
- European Parliament: 0 / 21
- Regional governors: 0 / 13
- Regional councillors: 0 / 611

Party flag
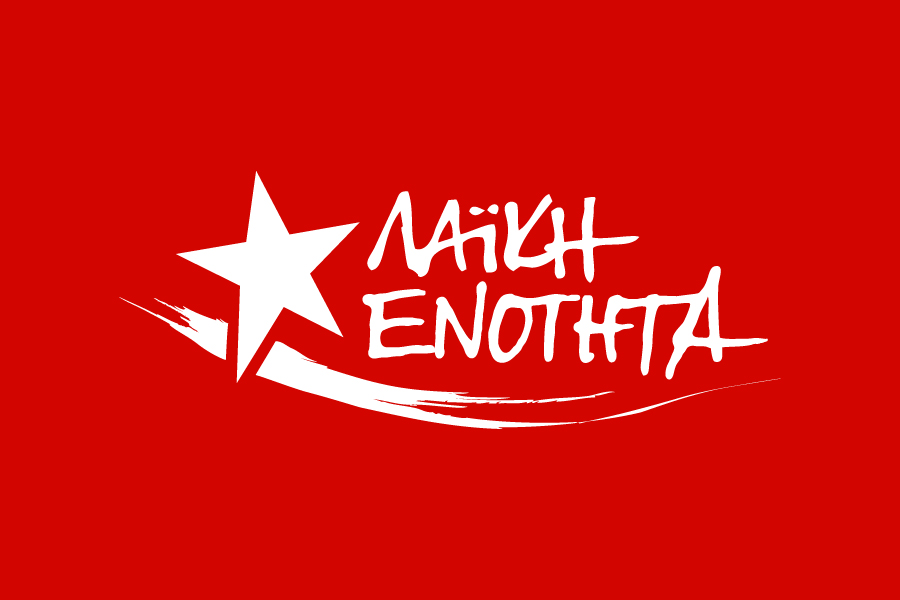

Website
- laiki-enotita.gr

Popular Unity – Insubordinate Left (Greek: Λαϊκή Ενότητα – Ανυπότακτη Αριστερά (ΛΑΕ-ΑΑ), Laïkí Enótita – Anipótakti Aristera; LAE-AA or simply LAE) is a left-wing political party in Greece.

Popular Unity was founded on 21 August 2015 by twenty five parliamentarians formerly affiliated to the Coalition of the Radical Left (Syriza), as a reaction to Prime Minister Alexis Tsipras' handling of the Greek bailout agreement of 2015.

== History ==
Popular Unity was founded on 21 August 2015 by 25 parliamentarians formerly affiliated to the Coalition of the Radical Left (Syriza), as a reaction to Prime Minister Alexis Tsipras' handling of the Greek bailout agreement of 2015. At foundation Popular Unity was the third largest party in the Greek parliament. It was led by the former Minister of Energy in the Tsipras cabinet, Panagiotis Lafazanis. Dimitris Stratoulis (former Alternate Minister of Social Security) and Costas Isychos (former Alternate Minister of National Defence), who were sacked in July 2015, also joined the new party.

=== September 2015 election ===
On 2 September 2015, the party programme for the snap election on September 20 was published. The party received about 2.9% of the vote, below the 3% threshold to win any seats in parliament. In response to the result the party said, 'we lost the game but not the war'.

=== 2023 election ===
Popular Unity contested the 2023 legislative elections in a coalition with MeRA25, as part of the "Alliance for Rupture".

== Naming ==
The name of the party is inspired by Popular Unity, the Chilean political alliance led by Salvador Allende.

== Policies ==
The party favours Greek withdrawal from the eurozone and reinstating the drachma as Greece's national currency. According to founding member Stathis Kouvelakis, a former member of Syriza's Central Committee, the new party supports socialist internationalism, pacifism, Greece's exit from NATO, and breaking military agreements with Israel.

== Election results ==
=== Hellenic Parliament ===
Election	Hellenic Parliament					Rank	Leader
Election	Votes	%	±pp	Seats won	+/−	Rank	Leader
September 2015	155,320	2.86%	New	0 / 300	N/A	#9	Panagiotis Lafazanis
2019	15,930	0.28%	-2.58	0 / 300	Steady	#13	

=== European Parliament ===
European Parliament
Election	Votes	%	±pp	Seats won	+/−	Rank	Leader
2019	31,671	0.56%	N/A	0 / 21		#22	Panagiotis Lafazanis

== Members of Parliament ==
Popular Unity had 26 members of the Hellenic Parliament prior to the September 2015 election, all of whom defected from Syriza. In alphabetical order, they were:

- Litsa Ammanatidou-Paschalidou
- Despoina Charalampidou
- Kostas Delimitros
- Vangelis Diamantopoulos
- Ioanna Gaitani
- Ilias Ioannidis
- Costas Isychos
- Thomas Kotsias
- Michail Kritsotakis
- Vasilis Kyriakakis
- Aglaia Kyritsi
- Panagiotis Lafazanis
- Costas Lapavitsas
- Stathis Leoutsakos
- Rachil Makri
- Evgenia Ouzounidou
- Thanasis Petrakos
- Eleni Psarrea
- Stefanos Samoilis
- Thanasis Skoumas
- Giannis Stathas
- Dimitris Stratoulis
- Alexandra Tsanaka
- Nadia Valavani
- Zissis Zannas
- Giannis Zerdelis
