= Dimitris Mardas =

Greek economist and politician

Dimitris Mardas MP
- Δημήτρης Μάρδας
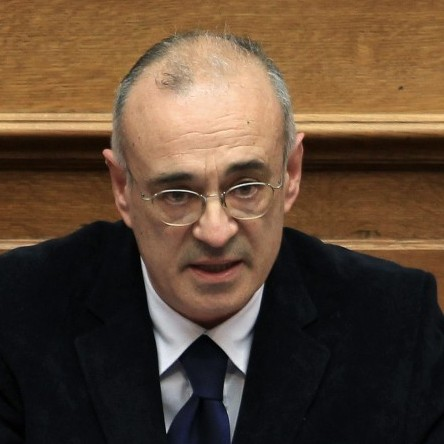

Member of the Hellenic Parliament for Thessaloniki B
- Incumbent
- Assumed office 23 September 2015

Deputy Minister for Foreign Affairs
- In office 23 September 2015 – 4 November 2016
- Prime Minister: Alexis Tsipras

Alternate Minister of Revenue
- In office 27 January 2015 – 28 August 2015
- Prime Minister: Alexis Tsipras

Personal details
- Born: 25 March 1955 (age 71) Istanbul, Turkey
- Party: Independent
- Education: Aristotle University of Thessaloniki; Pantheon-Sorbonne University; Panthéon-Assas University
- Profession: Economist
- Website: mardas.eu

Dimitris Mardas (Greek: Δημήτρης Μάρδας; born 25 March 1955) is a Greek economist and politician who served as Deputy Minister of Foreign Affairs during the Second Cabinet of Alexis Tsipras. He previously served as the Alternate Minister of Revenue in the First Cabinet of Alexis Tsipras. He was a Member of the Hellenic Parliament from 2015 until 2019, representing Thessaloniki B.

He is currently a professor of economics at the Aristotle University of Thessaloniki.

== Education ==
Mardas was educated in Thessaloniki before studying at the Aristotle University of Thessaloniki, where he received his degree in 1979. Mardas completed his postgraduate studies in economics at the universities of Pantheon-Sorbonne, from 1979 to 1980, and Panthéon-Assas, from 1980 to 1982. He was awarded his PhD in international trade from the Panthéon-Assas University in 1990.

== Academic career ==
From 1982 to 1993, Mardas was a research associate at the School of Economics of the Aristotle University of Thessaloniki. From 1993 to 1999 he was a lecturer at the University, from 1999 to July 2004 he was an assistant professor, and from July 2004 to October 2012 he was a deputy professor. In October 2012 he became a professor of economics at the Aristotle University of Thessaloniki. From 1996 to 2005 he was also a teacher at the National Centre for Public Administration and Local Government.

== Professional career ==
In 1987, Mardas worked for the Directorate-General for Economic and Financial Affairs. From 1992 to 1994, he worked again for the European Commission, this time for the Directorate-General for the Internal Market - Industry. During this period, he also took part in the European Union group in the Uruguay Round multilateral trade negotiations.

From April 2000 to February 2002, Mardas was Secretary-General of Commerce in the Ministry of Development. From October 2002 to April 2004, he was Managing Director of the Hellenic Export Promotion Organisation (HEPO),

== Political career ==
On 27 January 2015, Mardas was appointed as an independent member of the cabinet of Alexis Tsipras, taking the role of Alternate Minister of Revenue in the Ministry of Finance.

In April 2015, Mardas claimed that Germany owed Greece nearly 278.7 billion Euros in war reparations following the Axis occupation of Greece during the Second World War. In response, Sigmar Gabriel, the Vice Chancellor of Germany, called the claim "stupid".

On 15 July 2015, before an important vote in the Greek parliament on a bailout package, Mardas condemned Panagiotis Lafazanis, the Minister of Productive Reconstruction, Environment and Energy, and the pro-Drachma elements of Syriza as "lost in space".

In the September 2015 legislative election, Mardas was elected as a Syriza Member of the Hellenic Parliament representing Thessaloniki B. He was subsequently appointed as a Deputy Minister of Foreign Affairs, with responsibility for international economic relations.

== Personal life ==
Mardas is married and has two children. His daughter Kyveli is married with Dimitrios Pelkas.

== Articles and papers ==
- "Public procurement and foreign direct investment across France, Germany, Italy and the UK" (with George Papachristou and Nikos Varsakelis, Atlantic Economic Journal, Volume 36, Issue 2, pp. 183–193, 2008)
- "European integration, intra-industry trade in vertically differentiated products and the Balkan countries" (with Christos Nikas, International Advances in Economic Research, Volume 14, Issue 4, pp. 355–368, 2008)
- "Economic integration and intra-industry trade between the European community and the western Balkan countries" (with Christos Nikas, Transition Studies Review, Volume 15, Issue 3, pp. 511–523, 2008)
- "The latest enlargement of the EU and ‘buy national’rules." (The World Economy, Volume 28, Issue 11, pp. 1633–1650, 2005)
- "Science park, a high tech fantasy?: an analysis of the science parks of Greece" (with Nikos Varsakelis and Yiannis L. Bakouros, Technovation, Volume 22, Issue 2, pp. 123–128, 2002)
- "The EU-Turkey customs union and Greece: Who is the loser?" (with Thomas Moutos, International Advances in Economic Research, Volume 8, Issue 4, pp. 275–286, 2002)
- "Tendering procedures and buy-national policies" (International Advances in Economic Research, Volume 5, Issue 2, pp. 189–203, 1999)
- "Japanese foreign direct investment in the European union: An extension of the Keiretsu Network?" (with Mike Pournarakis and Nikos Varsakelis, The Mid-Atlantic Journal of Business, Volume 34, Issue 3, p. 189, 1998)
- "Performance indicators for monitoring the public procurement" (Finances publiques/Public Finance, Volume 52, Issues 3-4, pp. 411–28, 1997)
- "Selection criteria and the award procedure in public procurement" (with Dimitri Triantafyllou, International Advances in Economic Research, Volume 3, Issue 1, pp. 91–112, 1997)
- "Direct investment in a small open economy: the case of Greece" (with Nikos Varsakelis, Economia Internazionale/International Economics, Volume 49, Issue 3, pp. 401–415, 1996)
- "Statistical performance indicators for keeping watch over public procurement" (International Advances in Economic Research, Volume 1, Issue 4, p. 449, 1995)
- "Intra-industry trade in manufactured products between the European Economic Community and the Eastern European countries" (Journal of World Trade, Volume 26, Issue 5, pp. 5–23, 1992)

== See also ==
- First Cabinet of Alexis Tsipras
- Second Cabinet of Alexis Tsipras
- Greek government-debt crisis
