= Terens Quick =

Greek journalist and politician

- Τέρενς Κουίκ
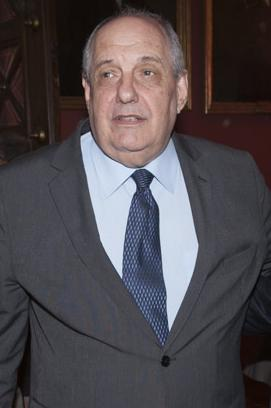

Deputy Minister for Greeks Living Abroad
- In office 5 November 2016 – 9 July 2019
- President: Prokopis Pavlopoulos
- Prime Minister: Alexis Tsipras
- Preceded by: Position created
- Succeeded by: Position abolished

Deputy Minister to the Prime Minister
- In office 23 September 2015 – 4 November 2016
- President: Prokopis Pavlopoulos
- Prime Minister: Alexis Tsipras
- Preceded by: Rodolphos Moronis
- Succeeded by: Dimitris Liakos
- In office 17 July 2015 – 28 August 2015
- Prime Minister: Alexis Tsipras
- Preceded by: Gabriel Sakellaridis

Deputy Minister of State for Coordinating Government Operations
- In office 27 January 2015 – 28 August 2015
- President: Prokopis Pavlopoulos
- Prime Minister: Alexis Tsipras

Member of the Hellenic Parliament
- In office 6 May 2012 – 31 December 2014

Personal details
- Born: Terens Spenser Nikolaos Quick; February 18, 1947 (age 79) Thessaloniki, Kingdom of Greece
- Party: Independent Greeks
- Children: 3
- Education: Panteion University

Terens Spenser Nikolaos Quick (Greek: Τέρενς Σπένσερ Νικόλαος Κουίκ; born 18 February 1947) is a Greek reporter, politician and member of the Independent Greeks, and government minister in 2015–2019.

== Early life and education ==
He was born in Thessaloniki 18 February 1947, the son of Philip Quick. He studied for one year at the University of Macedonia (then called the Thessaloniki School of Higher Industrial Studies) and graduated from Panteion University. He has been married and divorced twice and has three children.

== Early career ==
Since 1966 he has worked at a variety of Greek newspapers, including Ethnos, Fos ton Spor, Simerini and as the Athens correspondent for The Sun. Kouik presented for many years the central news program on the state-owned television channel Hellenic Broadcasting Corporation (ERT). In 1976 he took over entirely the organisation of channel ERT3 in Thessaloniki. until 1989 when he resigned this position to present on the principal newscast with Liana Kanelli, Evi Demiri, Elli Stai, Antonis Zisimatos, Kostas Serezis, Nasos Athanasiou, Alexandros Antonopoulou, Kostas Hountas and others.

Subsequently, he presented for about ten years the main newscast on television station ANT1 with co-presenters Nana Palaitsaki, Sofia Tsiliyianni, Tatiana Stefanidou, Liana Kanelli, and others. In the spring of 1992 and for the following two years he hosted the weekly broadcast "Tonight with Terens Kouik" in the evening slot with guests from all walks of life and from one year on he curated and presented the broadcast "Together on Sunday" in the mid-day slot. Parallel to this he worked on radio for ANT1 hosting the daily informational program "Morning Line".

Subsequent to this he presented the daily morning informational program on Star Channel. He followed with the daily presentation "Good Morning with Terens" on the television station Alter Channel.

In 2008 in Thessaloniki and on channel ET3 he presented for a second time "Tonight with Terens Quick" transmitted every week with guests of every stripe. From February 1, 2010, he took up presenting the afternoon program on television station Blue Sky. From September 2010 he moved to Kontra Channel to present the main newscast.

He has been a contributor to the newspapers Eleftheros, Eleftheros Typos, Apogevmatini, Vradyni, Proini and Eleftherotypia. Today he is a contributor to the Hora newspaper.

He has appeared in the film O Antifasistas (The Anti-Fascist) with the protagonist Kostas Voutsas. The essence of his character was played as essentially Terens Kouik himself, a reporter getting an interview with the central character Nicola Mancholini (Voutsas) at the beginning of the film.

== Political career ==
In the national elections of 1986, Quick was elected member of parliament for the deme of Athens on the party list New Democracy as part of the New Era of Miltiadis Evert. He received 13,511 points of preference, second place in the returns by number of ballots.

In March 2012, he took the position of public spokesman of the movement "Independent Greeks".

In the 2012 Greek parliamentary elections, he was counted the top vote-getter for Independent Greeks and elected to the Parliamentary Council of State, taking his seat as the parliamentary spokesman of the movement. He took part in the provincial elections of 2014 as a provincial candidate in Eastern Macedonia and Thrace in which he came in fourth on the party list.
