= Panagiotis Nikoloudis =

Greek prosecutor and politician

- Παναγιώτης Νικολούδης

Minister of State for Combatting Corruption
- In office 27 January 2015 – 23 September 2015
- Prime Minister: Alexis Tsipras; Vassiliki Thanou-Christophilou

Personal details
- Born: 1949 (age 76–77) Mani Peninsula, Greece
- Party: Independent

Panagiotis Nikoloudis (Greek: Παναγιώτης Νικολούδης; born 1949) is a Greek prosecutor who served as the Minister of State for Combatting Corruption in the Caretaker Cabinet of Vassiliki Thanou-Christophilou and the Cabinet of Alexis Tsipras.

== Professional career ==
He had been deputy prosecutor-general of the Greek Supreme Court and chairman of the Finance Intelligence Unit, a watchdog responsible for investigating financial crimes.

In February 2012, Nikoloudis revealed that one Member of the Hellenic Parliament (MP) had deposited one million Euros abroad in May 2011. In a session of the parliamentary Committee for Institutions and Transparency, he said, "To take your money abroad is not a sin, it is not illegal in the formal sense of the law, but for me it is indicative." In response, the Deputy Prime Minister, Evangelos Venizelos, revealed that the Ministry of Finance had found a number of instances of MPs sending money abroad in 2011 and had asked for the Finance Intelligence Unit's help on a number of these cases.

== Political career ==
On 27 January 2015, Nikoloudis was appointed as Minister of State for Combatting Corruption in Alexis Tsipras' cabinet. Shortly after taking on the role, in February 2015, he said that he was targeting a "handful of families who think that the state and public service exists to service their own interests." However, in an interview, he elaborated that he was not just targeting the rich in general as "I would be crazy to think like that."

In March 2015, it was announced that Nikoloudis was investigating 80,000 wealthy Greeks who were suspected of having at least 200,000 Euros each in undeclared funds in bank accounts abroad. Speaking to The Times, he said: "I'm not concerned about the so-called Lagarde list. It's just a footnote in this overriding bid to hunt down tax cheats."
