= Minister of State (Greece) =

Government minister of Greece

- Υπουργός Επικρατείας
- Coat of arms of the Hellenic Republic
- Incumbent; Akis Skertsos; Kostis Hatzidakis
- Appointer: Prime Minister of Greece
- Inaugural holder: Emmanouil Repoulis
- Formation: 1918
- Website: ypep.gr

The Minister of State (Greek: Υπουργός Επικρατείας) is a position within the Cabinet of Greece.

There are currently two Ministers of State serving in the Cabinet of Kyriakos Mitsotakis: Kostis Hatzidakis, who also serves as Deputy Prime Minister, and Akis Skertsos.

== History ==
The position is a development of the Minister without Portfolio (Υπουργός άνευ χαρτοφυλακίου), renamed in 1991. It has no fixed functions, each minister's responsibilities is defined ad hoc by the Prime Minister in each cabinet. The most usual role is the supervision of the General Secretariat to the Prime Minister and the General Secretariat to the Government, as well as the General Secretariats of Information and of Media, which resulted from the breakup of the former Ministry for the Press and the Media. The Minister of State has hence often functioned as the government spokesman.

== List of ministers ==
=== Ministers without Portfolio ===
- 1918–1919: Emmanouil Repoulis
- 1918–1919: Alexandros Diomidis
- 1919–1920: Andreas Michalakopoulos
- 1920–1922: Aristeidis Stergiadis
- 1921: Spyridon Stais
- 1921–1922: Charalampos Vozikis
- 1921–1922: Georgios Alexandropoulos
- 1922: Nikolaos Triantafyllakos
- 1922: Charalampos Vozikis
- 1922: Spyridon Stais
- 1935: Ioannis Metaxas
- 1935: Petros K. Mavromichalis
- 1944: Georgios Sakalis (Government-in-exile)
- 1944: Anastasios Tavoularis (Collaborationist government)
- 1944: Konstantinos Rentis (Government-in-exile)
- 1944: Petros Rallis (Government-in-exile)
- 1944: Spyridon Tsakopoulos (Government-in-exile)
- 1944: Emmanouil Sophoulis (Government-in-exile)
- 1944–1945: Georgios Kartalis
- 1944–1945: Lampros Lamprianidis
- 1945: Georgios Sideris
- 1945–1946: Georgios Kafantaris
- 1945–1946: Nikolaos Kazantzakis
- 1946: Georgios Papandreou
- 1946: Sofoklis Venizelos
- 1946: Panagiotis Kanellopoulos
- 1946–1947: Apostolos Alexandris
- 1947: Napoleon Zervas
- 1947: Sofoklis Venizelos
- 1947: Ioannis Politis
- 1947–1948: Dimitrios Lontos
- 1947–1948: Georgios Melas
- 1948–1949: Michail Mavrogordatos
- 1948–1950: Michail Ailianos
- 1948–1949: Konstantinos Rodopoulos
- 1948–1950: Vasilios Stephanopoulos
- 1949: Alexandros Diomidis
- 1949–1950: Sofoklis Venizelos
- 1949: Spyros Markezinis
- 1949: Emmanouil Loulakakis
- 1949–1950: Michail Mavrogordatos
- 1950: Grigorios Kasimatis
- 1950: Loukas Sakellaropoulos
- 1950: Dimitrios Gontikas
- 1950: Leon Makkas
- 1950: Manousos Voloudakis
- 1950: Leonidas Spais
- 1950: Stavros Kostopoulos
- 1950–1951: Georgios Papandreou
- 1950: Lampros Lamprianidis
- 1950: Efstathios Malamidas
- 1950–1951: Anastasios Vgenopoulos
- 1950: Gerasimos Vasiliadis
- 1950: Konstantinos Tsaldaris
- 1950: Georgios Lazanas
- 1950: Theodoros Desyllas
- 1950–1951: Emmanouil Kothris
- 1950: Konstantinos Rodopoulos
- 1950–1951: Ioannis Giannopoulos
- 1950–1951: Stylianos Choutas
- 1950–1951: Kosmas Alexandridis
- 1951–1952: Georgios Varvoutis
- 1951–1952: Ioannis Zigdis
- 1952: Panagiotis Kanellopoulos
- 1952–1955: Emmanouil Tsouderos
- 1952–1956: Georgios Exintaris
- 1956–1958: Grigorios Kasimatis
- 1963: Ioannis Giannopoulos
- 1963: Ioannis Toumpas
- 1963: Stefanos Stefanopoulos
- 1964: Stefanos Stefanopoulos
- 1964: Michail Stephanidis
- 1964: Evangelos Arvanitakis
- 1964–1965: Pavlos Vardinogiannis
- 1964–1965: Ioannis Giannopoulos
- 1965: Anastasios Droulias
- 1965: Georgios Melas
- 1965–1966: Dimitrios Vourdoumpas
- 1965–1966: Alexandros Karathodoros
- 1965: Iakovos Diamantopoulos
- 1965–1966: Apostolos Pagkoutsos
- 1965–1966: Anastasios Droulias
- 1966: Emmanouil Loulakakis
- 1966: Georgios Igoumenakis
- 1966: Stamatios Manousis
- 1968–1971: Dimitrios Patilis
- 1970–1971: Loukas Patras
- 1970–1971: Nikolaos Ephesios
- 1971–1972: Emmanouil Fthenakis
- 1973–1974: Ilias Balopoulos
- 1977–1981: Konstantinos Papakonstantinou
- 1977–1981: Georgios Kontogeorgis
- 1980: Ioannis Palaiokrassas
- 1980–1981: Stavros Dimas
- 1981–1982: Evangelos Kouloumpis
- 1984: Paraskevas Avgerinos
- 1984: Anastasios Peponis
- 1987–1989: Athanasios Philippopoulos
- 1988–1989: Christos Markopoulos
- 1988: Konstantinos Laliotis
- 1989: Emmanouil Kefalogiannis
- 1990–1991: Michail Theodorakis
- 1990–1991: Ioannis Kefalogiannis

=== Ministers of State ===
- 1991–1992: Michail Theodorakis
- 1991–1992: Ioannis Kefalogiannis
- 1991–1992: Tzannis Tzannetakis
- 1991–1992: Athanasios Kanellopoulos
- 1992–1993: Andreas Andrianopoulos
- 1995–1996: Antonios Livanis
- 1998–2000: Konstantinos Gitonas
- 2000–2001: Miltiadis Papaioannou
- 2001–2003: Stefanos Manikas
- 2003–2004: Alexandros Akrivakis
- 2004–2008: Theodoros Roussopoulos
- 2007: Xenophon-Rodolphos Moronis
- 2009–2011: Haris Pamboukis
- 2011: Ilias Mosialos
- 2011–2012: Georgios Stavropoulos
- 2011–2012: Pantelis Kapsis
- 2012: Antonios Argyros
- 2012–2015: Dimitrios I. Stamatis
- 2015 (January–August): Panagiotis Nikoloudis, Alekos Flambouraris and Nikos Pappas
- 2015 (August–September): Panagiotis Nikoloudis and Eleftherios Papageorgopoulos
- 2015–2019: Alekos Flambouraris
- 2015–2016: Nikos Pappas
- 2016–2019: Christoforos Vernardakis and Dimitris Tzanakopoulos
- 2019–2023: Kyriakos Pierrakakis and Giorgos Gerapetritis
- 2021–2023: Akis Skertsos
- 2023: Vassilios Skouris
- 2023–2024: Stavros Papastavrou
- 2023–2025: Makis Voridis
- 2023–present: Akis Skertsos
- 2025–present: Kostis Hatzidakis
