= Vassiliki Thanou-Christophilou =

Prime Minister of Greece (2015)

Vasiliki Thanou-Christophilou
- Βασιλική Θάνου-Χριστοφίλου
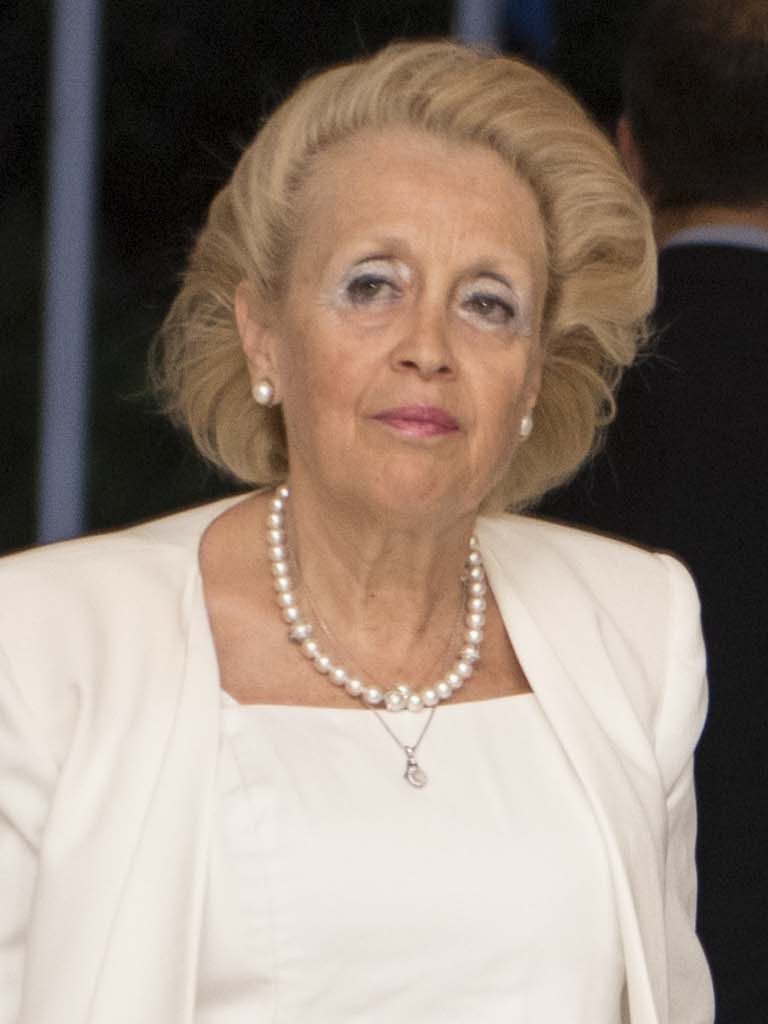
- Thanou-Christophilou in 2015

Prime Minister of Greece
- Caretaker; 27 August 2015 – 21 September 2015
- President: Prokopis Pavlopoulos
- Preceded by: Alexis Tsipras
- Succeeded by: Alexis Tsipras

President of the Court of Cassation
- In office 29 June 2015 – 30 June 2017
- Preceded by: Athanasios Koutromanos
- Succeeded by: Vasileios Peppas

Personal details
- Born: 3 November 1950 (age 75) Chalcis, Greece
- Party: Independent
- Children: 3
- Education: University of Athens; Panthéon-Assas University

Vasiliki Thanou-Christophilou (Greek: Βασιλική Θάνου-Χριστοφίλου, pronounced [vasiliˈci ˈθanu xristoˈfilu]; born 3 November 1950), also known as just Vasiliki Thanou, is a Greek judge who served as caretaker prime minister of Greece from 27 August to 21 September 2015, in the run-up to the September 2015 legislative election. She was the first-ever female Greek prime minister.

Thanou-Christophilou served as the president of the Court of Cassation, one of Greece's three supreme courts, from 2015 to 2017, and is currently the most senior judge in Greece. She teaches civil law at the National School of Judges of Greece and has been, since 2012, the president of the Greek Association of Judges and Prosecutors (SAD).

== Early life and education ==
Thanou-Christophilou was born in Chalcis and studied law at the National and Kapodistrian University of Athens before completing post-graduate studies in European law at Panthéon-Assas University.

== Judicial career ==
=== Early judicial career ===
Thanou-Christophilou first entered the judiciary in 1975, and became the president of the Court of First Instance in 1992. She became an appellate judge in 1996 and subsequently president of the Appeals Court in 2005. In 2008, she became a judge in the Court of Cassation one of Greece's three supreme courts.

Since 2009, Thanou-Christophilou has taught civil law at the National School of Judges in Greece. Thanou-Christophilou is also the president of the Greek Association of Judges and Prosecutors (SAD), having first been elected in 2012 for a two-year term, and re-elected for the same period of time in 2014. In 2014, she also became the vice president of the Court of Cassation.

On 1 July 2015, she succeeded Athanasios Koutroumanos as president of the Court of Cassation, following the former's retirement. Her appointment came at the recommendation of Nikos Paraskevopoulos, the Minister of Justice, Transparency and Human Rights. Thanou-Christophilou therefore became the 42nd president of the Court of Cassation since 1835, and the second-ever female president after Rena Asimakopoulou. Due to her seniority as a president of a Greek supreme court, she also became the president of the Supreme Electoral Court.

=== Term as Prime Minister of Greece ===
On 20 August 2015, Alexis Tsipras, who had been the prime minister of Greece since January 2015, resigned and asked for an interim government to be formed before an election could be held on 20 September. Constitutionally, before appointing the interim government, the President of Greece had to allow opposition parties several days to attempt to form their own government. After this process was completed, the president, Prokopis Pavlopoulos, had to appoint an interim government until the election could be held. According to Article 37 of the Constitution of Greece, a president of one of the three Greek supreme courts must fill the role of interim prime minister, which therefore meant that Thanou-Christophilou had to fill the role as she was the only sitting president.

On 27 August, Pavlopoulos formally announced that he would be appointing Thanou-Christophilou as prime minister that day, as negotiations with opposition parties had failed. Her caretaker cabinet was sworn in on 28 August. She was to serve as prime minister until a legislative election was held, on 20 September. She became Greece's first ever female prime minister, and the 184th since 1822. At her swearing-in ceremony, she noted, "the caretaker government’s duties are mainly holding the elections in a fair and smooth fashion."

One of the main issues that Thanou-Christophilou had to face as prime minister was the European migrant crisis. At one meeting, she said, "the migrant and refugee issue that was recently significantly enlarged and coincided with the term of the caretaker government." During her tenure, she met with Dimitris Avramopoulos, the EU Commissioner for European Immigration and Home Affairs to discuss the crisis. Her tenure ended on 21 September, following the official appointment of Tsipras as Prime Minister of Greece again. She attended the swearing-in of the new Greek parliament on 3 October 2015 alongside other dignitaries.

On 31 December 2015, Greek Reporter noted Thanou-Christophilou's appointment as prime minister as one of the "10 Significant Moments for Greece in 2015". However, the Bristol Anglo-Hellenic Cultural Society has noted that her appointment did "not actually represent a real step forward in equal rights in Greece" due to it being a constitutional necessity.

=== Later judicial career ===
On the 66th anniversary of the National Day of the People's Republic of China, Thanou-Christophilou was among those in attendance at the Chinese embassy in Athens, as well as fellow former prime minister of Greece, Costas Simitis.

Greek academic Stavros Tsakyrakis wrote a critical article about Thanou-Christophilou in 2016, labeling her "naive" and accusing her of politicking. Thanou-Christophilou decided to sue Tsakyrakis, arguing that the article was an "attack on her reputation and brought the position of Supreme Court president into disrepute." Tsakyrakis received the backing of other academics and students, as well as in press releases from PASOK and The River. In response, Thanou-Christophilou wrote to PASOK, criticising them for the content of their press release, an action that PASOK leader Fofi Gennimata described as "unacceptable".

On 18 March 2016, Giorgos Roupakias, who had been charged with the murder of Pavlos Fyssas in September 2013, was released from custody after completing the maximum of 18 months in pretrial detention. Before his release, Thanou-Christophilou had criticised the Athens Bar Association (DSA) and Ministry of Justice, Transparency and Human Rights for failing to ensure the trial of Roupakias and other Golden Dawn members took place before the end of their pretrial detention period.

In April 2016, Thanou-Christophilou announced that she would be stepping down from heading an investigation into a prosecutor's decision to shelf a probe into businessman Andreas Vgenopoulos and his dealings with the now defunct Laiki Bank. She made the decision after the prosecutor in question, Georgia Tsatani, accused her of having too close ties to Dimitris Papangelopoulos, an Alternate Minister in the justice ministry. Tsatani accused Papangelopoulos of trying to give up the case and hand it over to another prosecutor. Thanou-Christophilou said she was stepping down to "protect the standing and trust" of the judiciary and her role, and instead the investigation was to be headed by Aspasia Karellou, the deputy president of the Court of Cassation. The result of the investigation was that Tsatani was deemed to have broken two disciplinary rules in her handling of the case, and that the case could be reopened.

Isidoros Doghiakos, the head of the Athens Appeals Prosecutor, was fired in September 2016 for, a year earlier, distributing to fellow prosecutors an announcement accusing Thanou-Christophilou of unlawfully interfering with the prosecutors' office. The action triggered disciplinary hearings against him, which, following an appeal against the initial decision for being "too mild", he was relinquished of his duties and barred from entering the next election for the head of the prosecutors' office in Athens.

== Personal life ==
Thanou-Christophilou is married and has three children. She speaks Greek, French and English fluently.

== See also ==
- Caretaker Cabinet of Vassiliki Thanou-Christophilou

Political offices
Preceded by Alexis Tsipras	Prime Minister of Greece; 2015	Succeeded by Alexis Tsipras
Legal offices
Preceded by Athanasios Koutroumanos	President of the Court of Cassation; 2015–2017	Succeeded by Vasileios Peppas
Order of precedence
Preceded by Alexis Tsipras as former Prime Minister	Order of precedence of Greece; Former Prime Minister	Succeeded by Ioannis Sarmas as former Prime Minister
