= September 2015 Greek parliamentary election =

- 20 September 2015

All 300 seats in the Hellenic Parliament 151 seats needed for a majority
- Opinion polls
- Registered: 9,840,525
- Turnout: 56.16% (▼7.46 pp)
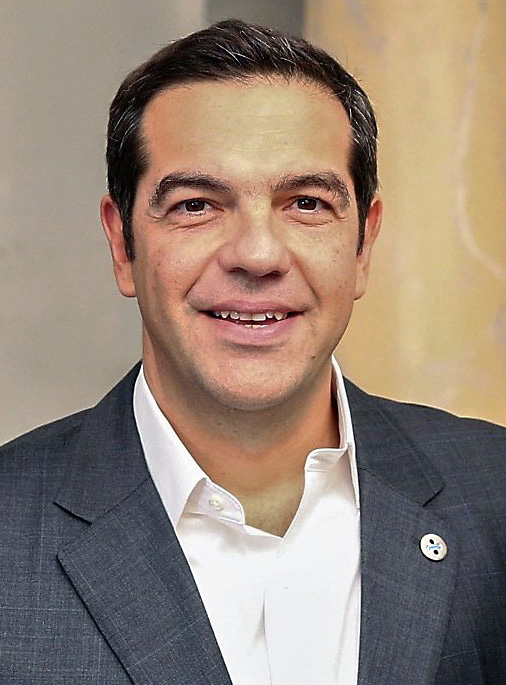

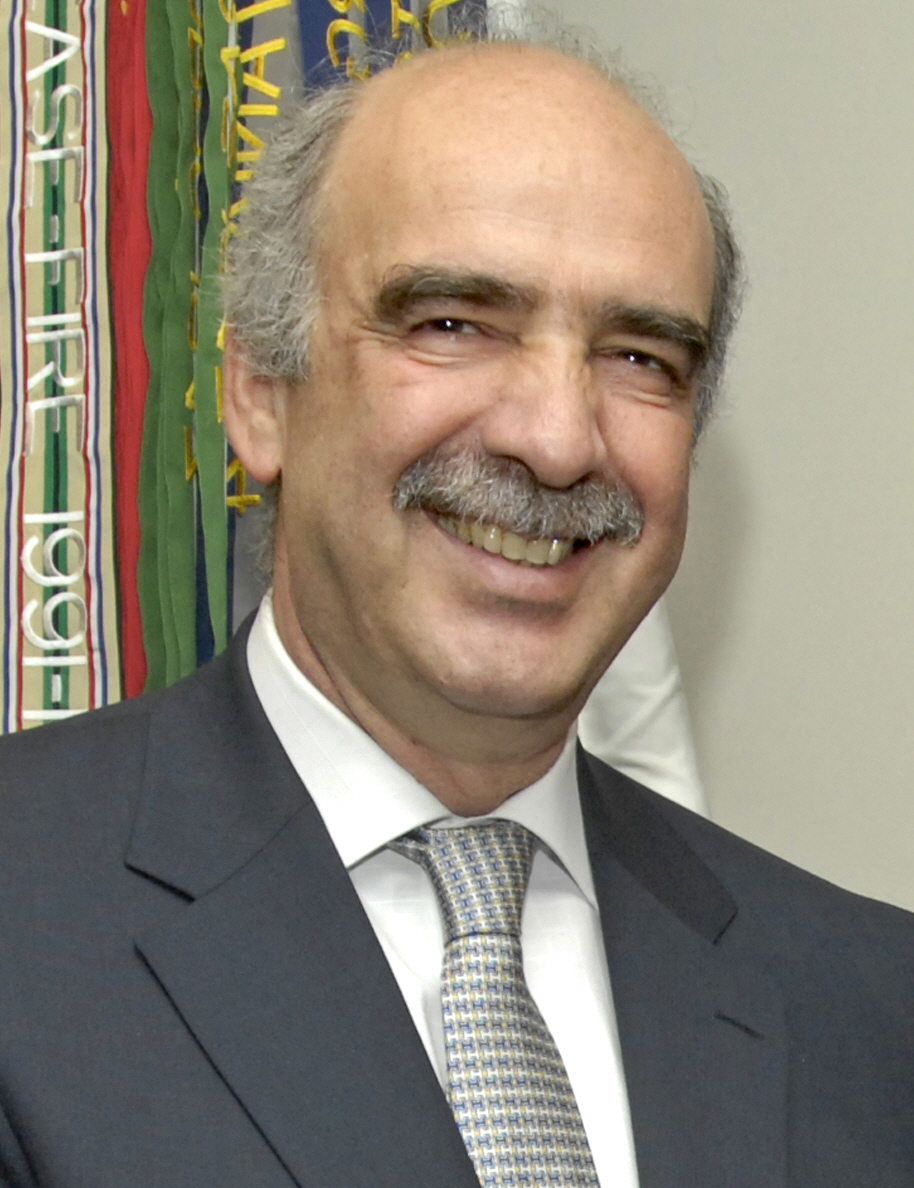

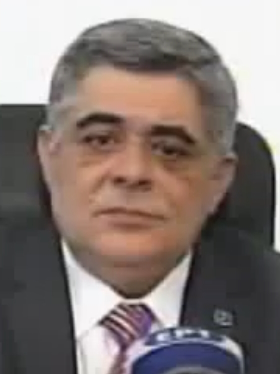

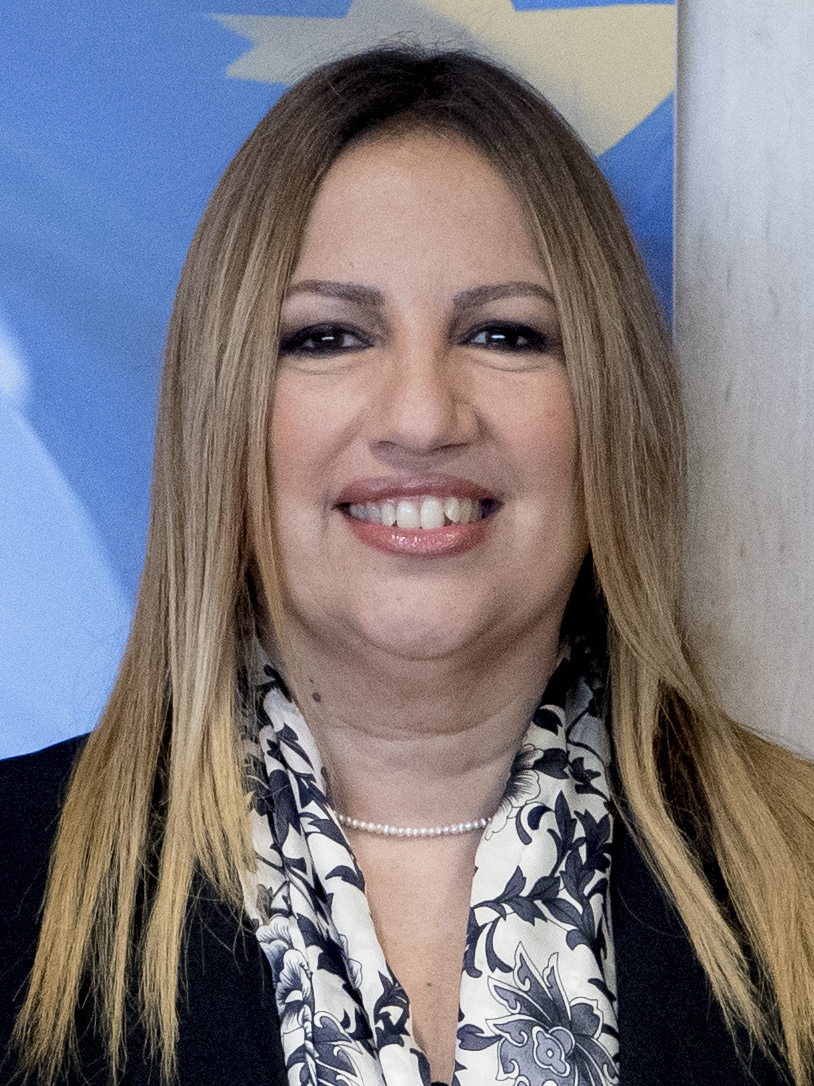

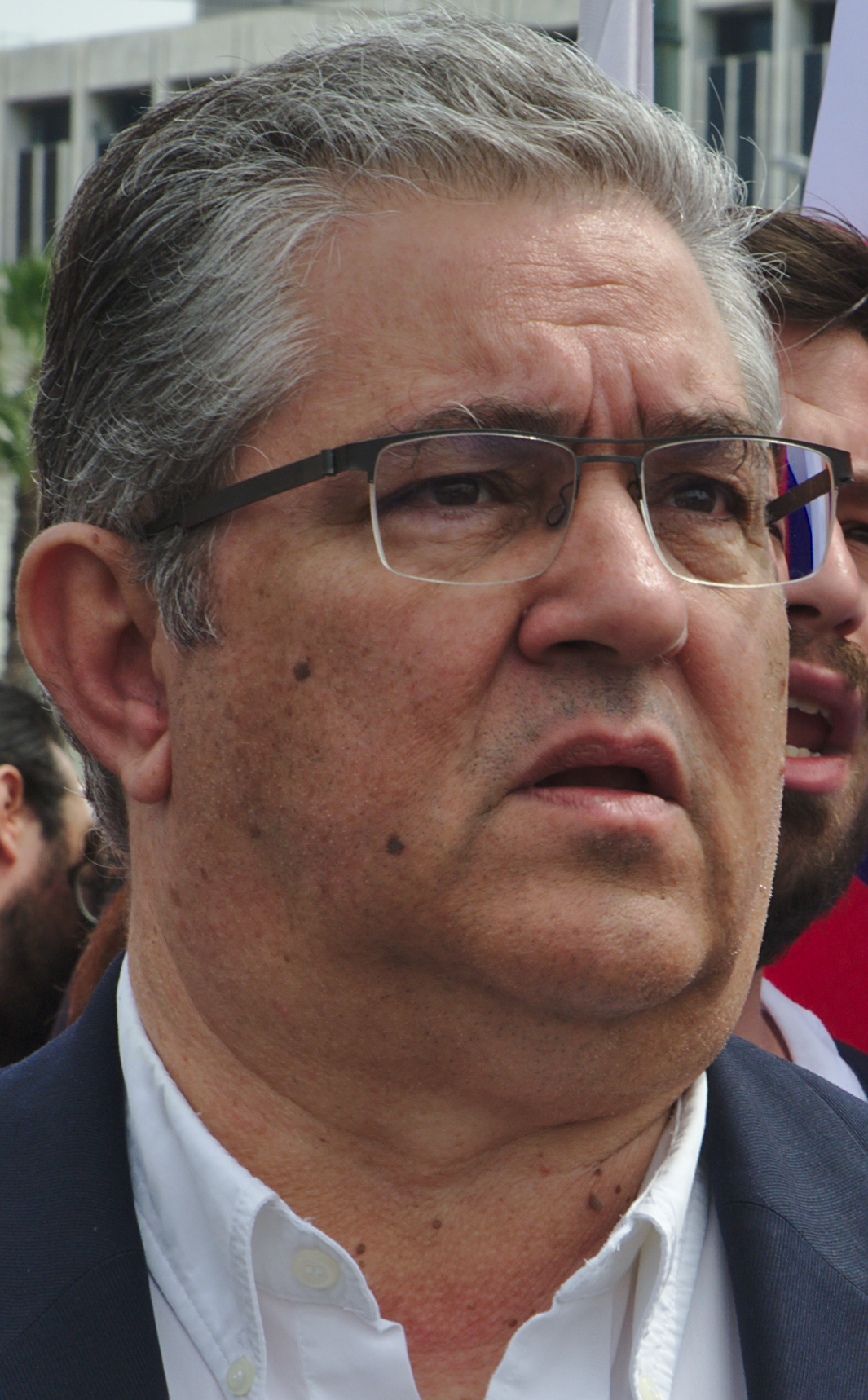

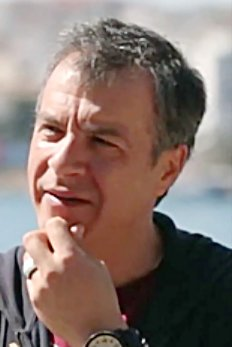

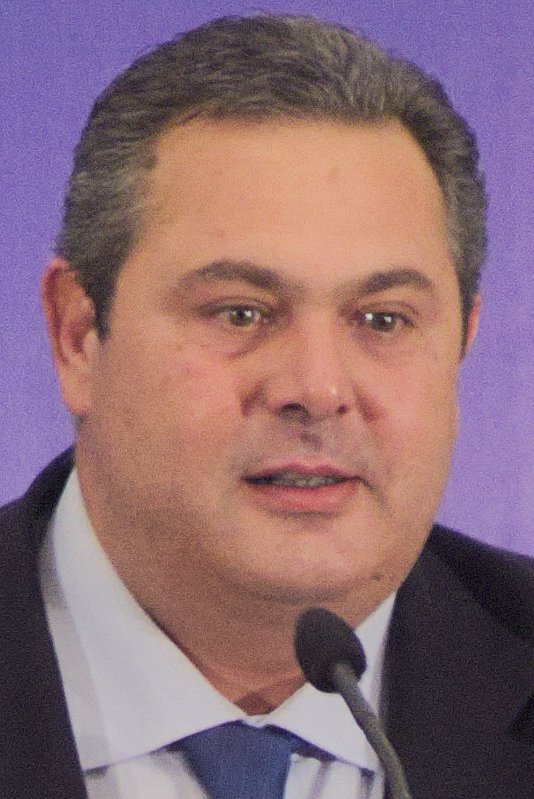

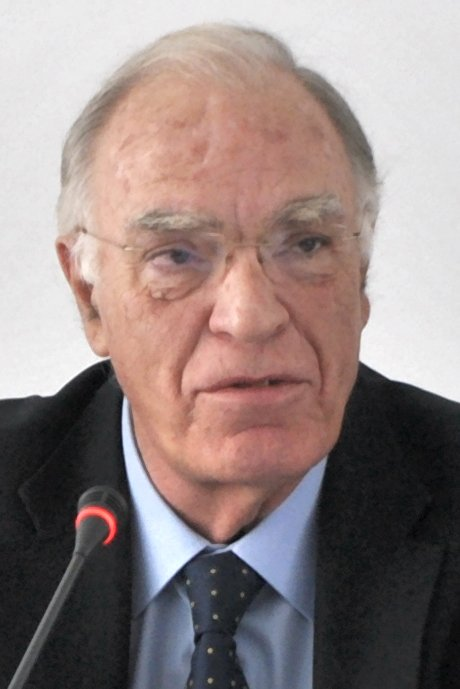
	First party	Second party	Third party
Leader	Alexis Tsipras	Vangelis Meimarakis	Nikolaos Michaloliakos
Party	Syriza	ND	ΧΑ
Last election	36.34%, 149 seats	27.81%, 76 seats	6.28%, 17 seats
Seats won	145	75	18
Seat change	▼4	▼1	▲1
Popular vote	1,926,526	1,526,400	379,722
Percentage	35.46%	28.09%	6.99%
Swing	▼0.88 pp	▲0.28 pp	▲0.71 pp
	Fourth party	Fifth party	Sixth party
Leader	Fofi Gennimata	Dimitris Koutsoumpas	Stavros Theodorakis
Party	DISY	KKE	To Potami
Last election	5.16%, 13 seats (Note: Democratic Alignment results are compared to the combined totals for PASOK and DIMAR in the January 2015 election.)	5.47%, 15 seats	6.05%, 17 seats
Seats won	17	15	11
Seat change	▲4	Steady	▼6
Popular vote	341,732	301,684	222,349
Percentage	6.29%	5.55%	4.09%
Swing	▲1.13 pp	▲0.08 pp	▼1.96 pp
	Seventh party	Eighth party
Leader	Panos Kammenos	Vassilis Leventis
Party	ANEL	EK
Last election	4.75%, 13 seats	1.79%, 0 seats
Seats won	10	9
Seat change	▼3	▲9
Popular vote	200,532	186,644
Percentage	3.69%	3.44%
Swing	▼1.06 pp	▲1.65 pp
- Results by constituency
Prime Minister before election
Vassiliki Thanou (interim)
Independent
Prime Minister after election
Alexis Tsipras
Syriza

Parliamentary elections were held in Greece on Sunday, 20 September 2015, following Prime Minister Alexis Tsipras' announced resignation on 20 August. At stake were all 300 seats in the Hellenic Parliament. This was a snap election, the sixth since 2007, since new elections were not due until February 2019.

The elections resulted in an unexpectedly-large victory for Alexis Tsipras' Coalition of the Radical Left (SYRIZA), which fell just six seats short of an absolute majority and was able to reform its coalition government with the right-wing Independent Greeks (ANEL). Opposition center-right New Democracy (ND) remained stagnant at 28% and 75 seats, despite pre-election opinion polls predicting a tie with Syriza or even opening the possibility of a ND government. Far-right Golden Dawn (XA) remained the third political force in the country rising slightly to 7%, while the Democratic Alignment (comprising PASOK and DIMAR) rose to 4th place nationally, as a result of the failure of the Communist Party of Greece (KKE) to increase its vote tally and the decline of To Potami. The Union of Centrists (EK) entered Parliament for the first time, while Syriza splinter group Popular Unity fell short of the required 3% threshold and did not win parliamentary representation.

Turnout was exceptionally low at 56.16%, the lowest ever recorded in a Greek parliamentary election since the restoration of democracy in 1974. Post-election analysis determined that voters' apathy and disaffection with politics and weariness after being continuously called to the polls (this election marked the third vote throughout 2015, after the January 2015 election and the July 2015 referendum) were the most likely causes for the low turnout.

== Background ==
=== Third bailout agreement ===
Several days after the bailout referendum, on 12 July 2015, the Greek Prime Minister, Alexis Tsipras came to an agreement with lenders for a new ESM program. Greece will receive a loan of up to €86 billion, which will be received gradually from 2015 until June 2018, including a buffer of up to €25 billion for the banking sector. In return, Greece will have to streamline the VAT system and broaden the tax base to increase revenue, reform the pension system, safeguard the full legal independence of the Hellenic Statistical Authority, automatically cut public spending to generate primary surpluses, reform justice with a view to accelerate the judicial process and reduce costs, implement all OECD toolkit I recommendations, modernise labour market legislation, modernise and strengthen the Greek administration, revoke the laws passed by the Tsipras government counter to the February 20 agreement—except for the one concerning the "humanitarian crisis"— or identify clear compensatory equivalents for the vested rights that were subsequently created (e.g. for the rehiring of fired public servants), recapitalize the banks, and privatize 50 billion of state assets. To help support growth and job creation in Greece up to 2020, the European Commission will help mobilise up to €35 billion to fund investment and economic activity, including in SMEs. The Investment Plan for Europe will also provide funding opportunities for Greece.

On 14 August, after a rancorous all-night debate, the Hellenic Parliament backed the country's new bailout deal, although more than 40 MPs from Syriza either voted against the deal or abstained, and Tsipras had to rely on the support of three opposition parties: New Democracy, The River and PASOK. Following the Parliament's decision, the Eurogroup welcomed the agreement between Greece and its lenders, and initiated the launching of the national procedures required for the approval of the new ESM program. These national procedures were concluded by 19 August, and Greece received the first disbursement of the initial tranche of up to €26 bn.

=== Government's resignation and snap election ===
Although Tsipras passed the bailout agreement through the Parliament and did not face a no-confidence motion, the fact that 43 of Syriza's 149 MPs had either opposed the bailout or abstained meant that he had effectively lost his parliamentary majority. Therefore, on 20 August, following the first disbursement of the initial tranche of the third bailout agreement, Tsipras submitted the resignation of his government to Prokopis Pavlopoulos, the President of Greece. Tsipras asked Pavlopoulos for the earliest possible election date (20 September), and publicly argued that "the present Parliament cannot offer a government of majority or a national unity government." In a televised address to the Greek people, Tsipras recognised that he did not achieve the agreement he expected before the January elections. Following Tsipras' resignation, the Constitution required Pavlopoulos to ask the second- and third-largest party in Parliament to form a government.

Some analysts' expectations that these two parties—and especially New Democracy—could waive their three-days exploratory mandate right to accelerate the procedures were not confirmed. Vangelis Meimarakis, the Leader of the Opposition, received the first exploratory mandate on 21 August, stating that he has the "political obligation and responsibility to exhaust all the options". Failing to form a government, Meimarakis returned the mandate to the President on 24 August. The same day, Panagiotis Lafazanis, the president of the third-largest party in Parliament, the newly formed Popular Unity, was handed the third and final exploratory mandate. Popular Unity was founded on 21 August by 25 anti-austerity and anti-bailout MPs, who split from Syriza and were largely affiliated to the party's Left Platform. After having failed to attract coalition partners for a new government, Lafazanis returned the mandate on 27 August. In a meeting with Pavlopoulos, Lafazanis asked the President to set a date for election no earlier than 27 September and to convene a council meeting of political leaders. However, given that Syriza, the Independent Greeks and the Communist Party had made clear that they had no interest in participating in such a meeting, Pavlopoulos opted for entering into telephone consultations with each political leader individually. After the conclusion of these consultations, which proved to be fruitless, Pavlopoulos named Vassiliki Thanou, President of the Court of Cassation (Areios Pagos), as interim prime minister, with the task of leading Greece to the elections. On 28 August, Pavlopoulos issued a presidential decree for the dissolution of the Parliament and the holding of a snap parliamentary election on 20 September 2015. The President's decision not to convene the council meeting of political leaders and to call the elections earlier than 27 September was fiercely criticised by Lafazanis; in an official statement, Popular Unity called the President's actions "a raw and provocative violation of both the letter and the spirit of the Constitution". However, other prominent politicians of the Opposition, such as PASOK's Evangelos Venizelos, who is also a professor of Constitutional Law, suggested that Pavlopoulos acted within the rules and without violating the Constitution.

== Electoral system ==
All voters were required to vote, with registration being automatic and voting being mandatory. However, none of the legally existing penalties or sanctions have ever been enforced.

250 seats are distributed on the basis of proportional representation, with a threshold of 3% required for entry into parliament. Blank and invalid votes, as well as votes cast for parties that fall short of the 3% threshold, are disregarded for seat allocation purposes. 50 additional seats are awarded as a majority bonus to the party that wins a plurality of votes, with coalitions in that regard not being counted as an overall party but having their votes counted separately for each party in the coalition, according to the election law. Parliamentary majority is achieved by a party or coalition of parties that command at least one half plus one (151 out of 300) of total seats.

== Opinion polls ==
Graphical summary

Local regression trend line of poll results from 25 January to 20 September 2015, with each line corresponding to a political party.

Poll results

The tables below list nationwide voting intention estimates. Refusals are generally excluded from the party vote percentages, while question wording and the treatment of "don't know" responses and those not intending to vote may vary between polling organisations. Polls that show their results without disregarding those respondents who were undecided or said they would abstain from voting (either physically or by voting blank) have been re-calculated by disregarding these numbers from the totals offered through a simple rule of three, in order to obtain results comparable to other polls and the official election results. When available, seat projections are displayed below the percentages in a smaller font. 151 seats were required for an absolute majority in the Hellenic Parliament.

Color key:

Exit poll

Polling firm/Commissioner	Fieldwork date	Sample size	Syriza	ND	XA	Potami	KKE	ANEL	PASOK	KIDISO	EK	LAE	Lead
September 2015 parliamentary election	20 Sep 2015	—N/a	35.5; 145	28.1; 75	7.0; 18	4.1; 11	5.6; 15	3.7; 10	6.3; 17	–	3.4; 9	2.9; 0	7.4
Singular Logic	20 Sep 2015 (21:00)	?	35.5; 145	28.0; 75	7.1; 19	4.0; 10	5.5; 15	3.7; 10	6.4; 17	–	3.4; 9	2.8; 0	7.5
Metron–Alco–GPO–Opinion–Marc–MRB	20 Sep 2015 (20:30)	8,000	34.6– 37.0	26.8– 29.2	5.6– 6.8	3.8– 4.8	5.7– 6.9	2.6– 3.4	5.5– 6.7	–	3.3– 4.3	2.5– 3.3	7.8
Kapa Research/To Vima	20 Sep 2015 (20:00)	5,000	33.8; 144	28.5; 75	7.2; 20	4.0; 10	5.8; 15	3.9; 10	6.9; 17	–	3.5; 9	2.9; 0	5.3
Metron–Alco–GPO–Opinion–Marc–MRB	20 Sep 2015 (20:00)	8,000	33.0– 35.0; 139/143	28.5– 30.0; 75/80	7.0– 8.0; 18/22	4.0– 4.5; 10/12	5.5– 6.5; 12/15	3.0– 4.0; 8/10	6.0– 7.0; 16/20	–	3.0– 4.0; 8/10	2.5– 3.0; 0	4.5– 5.0
Kapa Research/To Vima	20 Sep 2015 (19:00)	5,000	32.0; 133/136	29.5; 77/79	7.0; 18/19	5.0; 13	6.4; 17	3.5; 9	6.6; 17/18	–	3.0; 0/8	3.2; 8/9	2.5
PAMAK	20 Sep 2015 (19:00)	?	31.0– 35.0	29.0– 33.0	6.0– 8.0	3.5– 5.5	5.0– 7.0	2.5– 4.5	5.0– 7.0	–	2.5– 4.5	2.5– 3.5	2.0
Pulse RC/Action24	20 Sep 2015 (19:00)	?	29.5– 34.5	28.5– 33.5	5.0– 8.0	4.5– 7.5	4.5– 7.5	1.5– 4.5	5.0– 8.0	–	2.0– 5.0	2.0– 5.0	1.0
Metron–Alco–GPO–Opinion–Marc–MRB	20 Sep 2015 (19:00)	8,000	30.0– 34.0; 127/137	28.5– 32.5; 73/83	6.5– 8.0; 16/22	4.0– 5.5; 10/14	5.5– 7.0; 14/18	3.0– 4.0; 8/10	5.5– 7.0; 14/18	–	3.2– 4.2; 9/12	2.5– 3.5; 8/9	1.5
Kapa Research/To Vima	17–18 Sep 2015	1,201	33.0	29.9	6.8	5.4	6.0	3.2	6.3	–	3.4	3.3	3.1
MRB/Star	17–18 Sep 2015	?	31.8	31.9	7.1	6.0	5.1	2.8	5.9	–	3.6	3.3	0.1
PAMAK/Skai	17–18 Sep 2015	1,083	34.0	31.0	7.0	5.0	5.5	2.0	5.5	–	3.5	3.5	3.0
Palmos Analysis/tvxs	17–18 Sep 2015	?	32.5	31.5	7.5	4.5	7.0	2.5	5.5	–	3.0	4.0	1.0
MRB/Star	17–18 Sep 2015	?	31.7	30.6	6.6	6.0	5.7	3.2	5.7	–	4.0	3.9	1.1
GPO/Mega TV	16–18 Sep 2015	1,200	32.4	29.5	6.9	5.5	6.5	3.4	6.8	–	3.2	4.4	2.9
Rass/iefimerida	16–18 Sep 2015	1,002	31.7	30.9	7.5	4.6	6.1	2.8	6.7	–	3.4	3.4	0.8
Marc/Alpha TV	15–18 Sep 2015	1,754	31.7; 135	30.4; 81	6.9; 18	5.9; 16	5.8; 15	2.9; 0	5.8; 15	–	4.0; 11	3.3; 9	1.3
ProRata/EfSyn	17 Sep 2015	1,003	32.0	28.5	8.0	6.0	6.5	3.0	6.0	–	4.0	3.0	3.5
Metron Analysis/ANT1	16–17 Sep 2015	1,204	31.7; 132	31.2; 80	7.1; 18	5.8; 15	6.0; 15	3.0; 8	6.0; 15	–	3.1; 8	3.4; 9	0.5
Bridging Europe	15–17 Sep 2015	1,031	31.7	27.8	7.1	4.7	6.7	2.6	5.3	–	2.4	5.8	3.9
Metrisi/Eleftheros Typos	15–17 Sep 2015	?	30.7	32.3	6.3	5.3	6.1	3.1	5.8	–	3.5	3.6	1.6
Pulse RC/To Pontiki	15–17 Sep 2015	1,605	30.5	30.5	7.5	6.0	6.0	2.5	7.5	–	3.0	3.5	Tie
Interview/Vergina TV	15–17 Sep 2015	1,000	30.5	33.0	5.5	5.0	6.5	2.5	6.5	–	4.5	2.5	2.5
Alco/NewsIT	15–17 Sep 2015	1,000	30.7	30.3	7.5	5.2	7.0	3.0	5.7	–	4.5	3.7	0.4
AUTH	14–17 Sep 2015	?	31.1	29.6	7.8	4.9	5.8	2.3	6.1	–	3.0	5.4	1.5
Public Issue	14–17 Sep 2015	1,009	33.0; 139	30.0; 81	7.0; 19	4.5; 12	6.5; 18	2.5; 0	8.0; 22	–	2.5; 0	3.5; 9	3.0
Metron Analysis/Parapolitika	15–16 Sep 2015	?	31.6; 84	31.9; 134	6.7; 18	5.9; 16	6.2; 16	2.7; 0	5.2; 14	–	3.6; 9	3.4; 9	0.3
E-Voice/dikaiologitika.gr	15–16 Sep 2015	1,007	32.6	28.5	8.1	5.7	5.6	3.5	5.6	–	2.9	4.7	4.1
Kapa Research/To Vima	15–16 Sep 2015	1,007	31.3	30.7	7.2	5.4	5.9	3.2	6.4	–	3.5	3.8	0.6
ProRata/EfSyn	15 Sep 2015	1,000	33.0	28.0	9.0	6.0	6.0	3.0	6.0	–	3.5	3.5	5.0
GPO/Ethnikos Kirikas	14–15 Sep 2015	1,060	31.5	31.5	6.8	4.8	5.8	3.4	6.8	–	3.4	3.6	Tie
PAMAK/Skai	14–15 Sep 2015	2,214	31.5	32.0	7.0	5.5	6.0	2.5	5.5	–	4.0	3.0	0.5
Pulse RC/Action24	14–15 Sep 2015	1,258	30.0	30.5	7.5	6.0	6.0	2.5	7.5	–	3.0	4.0	0.5
Data RC/pelop.gr	11–14 Sep 2015	1,063	31.7	32.7	6.7	5.6	6.3	3.2	6.9	–	3.1	3.2	1.0
Metron Analysis/ANT1	10–14 Sep 2015	1,403	31.6; 80/130	31.6; 80/130	7.2; 18	5.9; 15	6.2; 16	3.0; 8	5.3; 13	–	3.9; 10	3.8; 10	Tie
Pulse RC/To Pontiki	10–11 Sep 2015	1,204	30.0	30.0	7.5	6.0	6.0	2.5	7.0	–	4.0	4.5	Tie
Palmos Analysis/tvxs	10–11 Sep 2015	1,004	33.5; 135	30.5; 77	7.0; 18	5.5; 14	5.0; 13	3.5; 9	6.0; 15	–	4.5; 11	3.0; 8	3.0
GPO/Mega TV	10–11 Sep 2015	1,200	30.4	30.1	7.6	5.1	6.7	3.5	7.0	–	3.9	4.2	0.3
Bridging Europe	9–11 Sep 2015	1,028	32.8	24.6	7.8	5.9	6.6	2.6	3.8	–	2.8	7.8	8.2
PAMAK/Skai	9–11 Sep 2015	2,001	31.0	30.0	7.5	5.5	6.5	2.0	6.0	–	5.0	3.5	1.0
Kapa Research/To Vima	9–10 Sep 2015	1,008	29.7	29.2	7.8	5.6	6.6	3.5	6.8	–	4.0	4.7	0.5
Alco/Proto Thema	8–10 Sep 2015	1,000	30.6; 128/130	29.7; 75/78	7.8; 20	4.8; 12/13	7.4; 19/20	3.1; 0/8	6.2; 16	–	4.7; 12	4.0; 10/11	0.9
Metron Analysis/Parapolitika	8–10 Sep 2015	1,206	31.7; 131	31.3; 80	6.2; 16	5.5; 14	5.9; 15	3.0; 8	5.2; 13	–	5.9; 15	3.3; 8	0.4
Public Issue	5–10 Sep 2015	1,009	31.0	31.0	7.0	4.5	6.5	2.0	8.0	–	3.0	4.0	Tie
ProRata/EfSyn	7–9 Sep 2015	1,300	34.5	28.5	8.0	5.0	5.5	3.0	5.5	–	4.0	3.0	6.0
ProRata/HellasNet	5–9 Sep 2015	1,300	34.0	28.5	8.0	5.0	5.5	3.0	5.5	–	4.0	3.0	5.5
Pulse RC/Action24	7–8 Sep 2015	1,319	30.5	30.0	7.5	6.0	6.5	2.0	7.0	–	4.0	4.0	0.5
GPO/Ethnikos Kirikas	3–4 Sep 2015	1,071	30.0	30.5	7.4	5.4	5.7	3.6	6.8	–	4.5	4.8	0.5
MRB/Star	3–4 Sep 2015	1,003	29.6	29.6	7.1	5.4	5.9	2.7	6.1	–	4.6	4.3	Tie
Pulse RC/bankingnews.gr	2–4 Sep 2015	1,108	30.0	29.5	7.0	6.0	6.0	3.0	6.5	–	4.5	4.5	0.5
Public Issue	1–4 Sep 2015	1,002	28.5; 75	30.0; 129	7.0; 18	5.5; 15	7.5; 20	2.0; 0	8.0; 21	–	3.5; 9	5.0; 13	1.5
Marc/Ethnos	1–4 Sep 2015	1,032	30.4	29.9	7.4	6.3	6.0	3.5	5.4	–	4.5	4.5	0.5
Kapa Research/To Vima	2–3 Sep 2015	?	30.0	29.3	7.4	5.8	6.0	3.4	6.6	–	4.0	5.3	0.7
PAMAK/Skai	1–3 Sep 2015	1,041	30.0	30.0	7.5	6.0	6.5	1.5	5.0	–	5.0	4.5	Tie
Bridging Europe	1–3 Sep 2015	1,023	32.6	24.0	7.4	7.1	6.8	2.4	3.8	–	2.9	7.5	8.6
Pulse RC/To Pontiki	1–2 Sep 2015	1,105	30.0	29.5	7.5	6.0	6.0	3.0	6.5	–	4.0	5.0	0.5
AUTH	31 Aug–2 Sep 2015	?	27.1	28.2	9.6	5.3	5.5	2.1	4.2	–	4.8	8.6	1.1
Metron Analysis/Parapolitika	31 Aug–2 Sep 2015	1,207	29.6; 79	30.4; 131	6.5; 17	6.0; 16	6.5; 17	2.6; 0	5.0; 14	–	5.1; 14	4.3; 12	0.8
GPO/Mega TV	31 Aug–2 Sep 2015	?	30.5	30.9	6.7	5.6	6.2	3.7	6.5	–	3.9	4.9	0.4
Alco/NewsIT	31 Aug–2 Sep 2015	1,000	29.2	28.7	7.8	5.5	6.9	2.6	5.3	–	4.6	4.9	0.5
Pulse RC/Action24	31 Aug–1 Sep 2015	1,108	30.5	29.5	7.5	6.0	6.0	3.0	6.0	1.0	3.5	5.0	1.0
Alco/Proto Thema	25–28 Aug 2015	1,000	29.3	27.4	8.1	6.6	6.1	3.1	5.3	1.6	3.9	5.2	1.9
Marc/Alpha TV	25–28 Aug 2015	?	31.2	28.6	6.8	7.1	5.2	3.7	5.4	–	4.7	4.7	2.6
E-Voice/HellasNet	26–27 Aug 2015	?	32.0	26.9	7.1	5.4	4.8	4.2	4.0	–	3.5	4.8	5.1
PAMAK/Skai	25–27 Aug 2015	1,100	29.0	25.5	6.5	7.0	7.0	2.5	5.5	–	5.5	6.0	3.5
MRB/Agora	25–27 Aug 2015	1,008	29.6	27.4	7.5	6.7	5.7	2.8	4.7	–	5.7	5.1	2.2
Metron Analysis/Parapolitika	24–27 Aug 2015	?	29.0; 129	27.8; 75	8.3; 23	6.7; 18	5.9; 16	2.3; 0	5.4; 15	–	4.9; 13	4.1; 11	1.2
Kapa Research/To Vima	25–26 Aug 2015	1,005	31.5	27.9	7.8	6.3	5.8	3.5	4.6	–	3.8	5.5	3.6
ProRata/EfSyn	25–26 Aug 2015	1,000	31.0	26.0	8.5	5.5	6.5	2.5	6.0	–	4.0	4.5	5.0
Rass/To Paron	24–26 Aug 2015	1,003	29.5	26.8	7.0	7.2	6.8	2.8	3.8	–	5.2	6.4	2.7
Bridging Europe	24–26 Aug 2015	1,015	33.4	22.8	7.4	7.7	7.2	3.0	3.6	–	3.2	7.6	10.6
Interview/Vergina TV	24–25 Aug 2015	?	29.0	26.5	7.0	6.5	5.5	4.0	5.5	–	5.0	5.5	2.5
Bridging Europe	22–24 Jul 2015	1,010	41.2	23.1	7.3	7.9	6.5	5.1	3.7	–	–	–	18.1
Metron Analysis/Parapolitika	20–21 Jul 2015	?	41.2	21.9	6.6	7.5	5.1	3.4	4.4	1.6	4.0	–	19.3
Palmos Analysis/EfSyn	15–17 Jul 2015	1,004	42.5; 164	21.5; 58	6.5; 17	8.0; 22	5.5; 16	3.0; 8	6.0; 17	–	–	–	21.0
Metron Analysis/Parapolitika	8–9 Jul 2015	?	45.6	22.6	5.1	6.3	4.5	3.2	5.0	1.3	4.1	–	23.0
Marc	3 Jul 2015	?	40.5	24.9	5.0	6.2	5.2	3.7	5.6	–	3.0	–	15.6
ProRata	2 Jul 2015	?	42.0	24.0	8.0	6.5	6.5	2.5	3.0	–	2.5	–	18.0
Alco/Proto Thema	24–26 Jun 2015	1,000	38.6	25.5	6.3	6.3	6.1	3.9	4.6	1.8	2.3	–	13.1
Public Issue	11–17 Jun 2015	1,006	47.5	19.5	6.5	6.5	5.5	4.0	4.5	–	2.0	–	28.0
ProRata/Sto Kokkino	15–16 Jun 2015	1,006	43.0	17.5	7.5	7.5	5.0	4.0	4.0	1.5	4.0	–	25.5
GPO/Mega TV	15 Jun 2015	?	39.7	26.0	6.2	6.8	6.1	4.2	3.6	–	3.1	–	13.7
Metrisi/Proto Thema	10–12 Jun 2015	?	37.6	28.2	5.8	7.1	6.2	5.9	3.6	–	–	–	9.4
Marc/Alpha TV	7–10 Jun 2015	1,001	41.2	23.6	6.0	7.6	6.3	4.5	3.9	1.3	2.2	–	17.6
Metron Analysis/Parapolitika	6 Jun 2015	?	45.0	21.4	5.3	7.4	5.2	3.8	3.5	2.1	1.3	–	23.6
PAMAK/Skai	3–6 Jun 2015	1,058	43.0	20.5	7.0	7.0	6.0	3.5	4.5	–	–	–	22.5
Alco/NewsIT	3–4 Jun 2015	1,000	39.2	25.6	6.0	6.6	5.6	4.0	4.3	1.2	2.0	–	13.6
Metrisi/Proto Thema	28–29 May 2015	?	37.8	27.4	5.8	7.2	6.0	6.0	3.5	–	–	–	10.4
Metrisi/Proto Thema	20–22 May 2015	1,108	38.0	27.2	5.8	7.1	5.9	6.0	3.5	–	–	–	10.8
Public Issue	13–19 May 2015	1,013	48.5	21.0	6.0	5.5	6.0	3.5	4.0	–	–	–	27.5
PAMAK/Skai	13–15 May 2015	1,023	45.0	19.0	7.5	7.5	5.0	3.5	3.5	–	–	–	26.0
Rass/To Paron	5–7 May 2015	1,002	43.7	23.3	5.0	7.2	5.8	5.1	4.0	–	1.8	–	20.4
MRB/Real News	5–7 May 2015	1,006	41.8	24.2	5.9	6.7	6.4	4.7	3.5	1.2	2.5	–	17.6
Marc/EfSyn	5–7 May 2015	1,001	41.6	24.1	6.2	7.7	5.7	4.7	3.6	1.5	1.7	–	17.5
Palmos Analysis/SBC TV	5–6 May 2015	1,036	44.5; 170	20.5; 55	6.5; 18	8.5; 23	5.0; 14	4.0; 11	3.5; 9	–	–	–	24.0
ProRata/Sto Kokkino	4–6 May 2015	1,000	47.5	18.5	6.0	6.5	6.0	3.5	3.5	1.5	2.0	–	29.0
Metrisi/Proto Thema	28–30 Apr 2015	?	39.1	27.8	5.6	6.5	5.8	5.8	3.9	–	–	–	11.3
GPO/Mega TV	29 Apr 2015	?	40.6	24.4	6.1	7.2	6.1	5.6	4.4	–	2.0	–	16.2
Marc/Alpha TV	25–28 Apr 2015	1,001	41.3	24.1	6.1	6.7	5.9	4.9	3.2	1.6	1.7	–	17.2
Alco/Proto Thema	20–23 Apr 2015	1,000	42.7	26.0	6.0	6.1	6.1	4.3	3.9	–	1.8	–	16.7
Kapa Research/To Vima	21–22 Apr 2015	1,007	41.0	24.1	6.3	8.1	5.6	5.1	4.3	–	–	–	16.9
Metrisi/Proto Thema	14–16 Apr 2015	?	39.4	27.5	5.9	6.3	5.9	5.6	3.5	–	–	–	11.9
Metron Analysis/Parapolitika	2–4 Apr 2015	?	45.6	20.9	5.5	7.5	5.0	3.8	4.3	1.7	2.2	–	24.7
Metrisi/Proto Thema	31 Mar–2 Apr 2015	?	40.3	27.0	6.2	6.2	5.8	5.5	3.3	–	–	–	13.3
Metrisi/iefimerida	17–20 Mar 2015	1,008	40.9	26.8	6.7	5.9	5.9	4.8	3.1	–	–	–	14.1
Palmos Analysis/SBC TV	17–19 Mar 2015	1,006	51.5; 192	20.5; 56	4.5; 12	5.0; 14	5.5; 15	4.0; 11	2.5; 0	–	–	–	31.0
Marc/Alpha TV	18 Mar 2015	?	44.8	23.4	5.4	4.8	5.5	5.0	2.8	2.0	1.6	–	21.4
Metron Analysis/Parapolitika	16–18 Mar 2015	?	47.8	21.1	6.1	5.6	4.5	4.4	3.4	2.2	2.1	–	26.7
Interview/Vergina TV	16–17 Mar 2015	1,000	46.4	19.8	6.7	4.9	6.0	5.6	3.7	–	–	–	26.6
MRB/Star	27 Feb–2 Mar 2015	1,009	46.2	21.5	5.7	6.0	5.9	6.0	3.2	–	2.1	–	24.7
Metron Analysis/Parapolitika	24–25 Feb 2015	?	47.6	20.7	5.9	6.4	4.7	4.3	3.4	1.6	2.8	–	26.9
Marc/Alpha TV	12–13 Feb 2015	1,005	49.4	20.0	5.1	5.0	5.2	5.1	3.0	2.2	2.0	–	29.4
January 2015 parliamentary election	25 Jan 2015	—N/a	36.3; 149	27.8; 76	6.3; 17	6.1; 17	5.5; 15	4.8; 13	4.7; 13	2.5; 0	1.8; 0	–	8.5

=== Candidates' debates ===
September 2015 Greek parliamentary election debates
Date	Organisers	Moderator(s)	P Present A Absent invitee N Non-invitee								
Date	Organisers	Moderator(s)	SYRIZA Tsipras	ND Meimarakis	LAE Lafazanis	XA Michaloliakos	River Theodorakis	KKE Koutsoumpas	ANEL Kammenos	DISY Gennimata	Refs
9 Sep	ERT1	Panos Charitos	P	P	P	N	P	P	P	P	
14 Sep	ERT1	Panos Charitos	P	P	N	N	N	N	N	N	

== Results ==
Results, showing the seats won by each party in each electoral district.

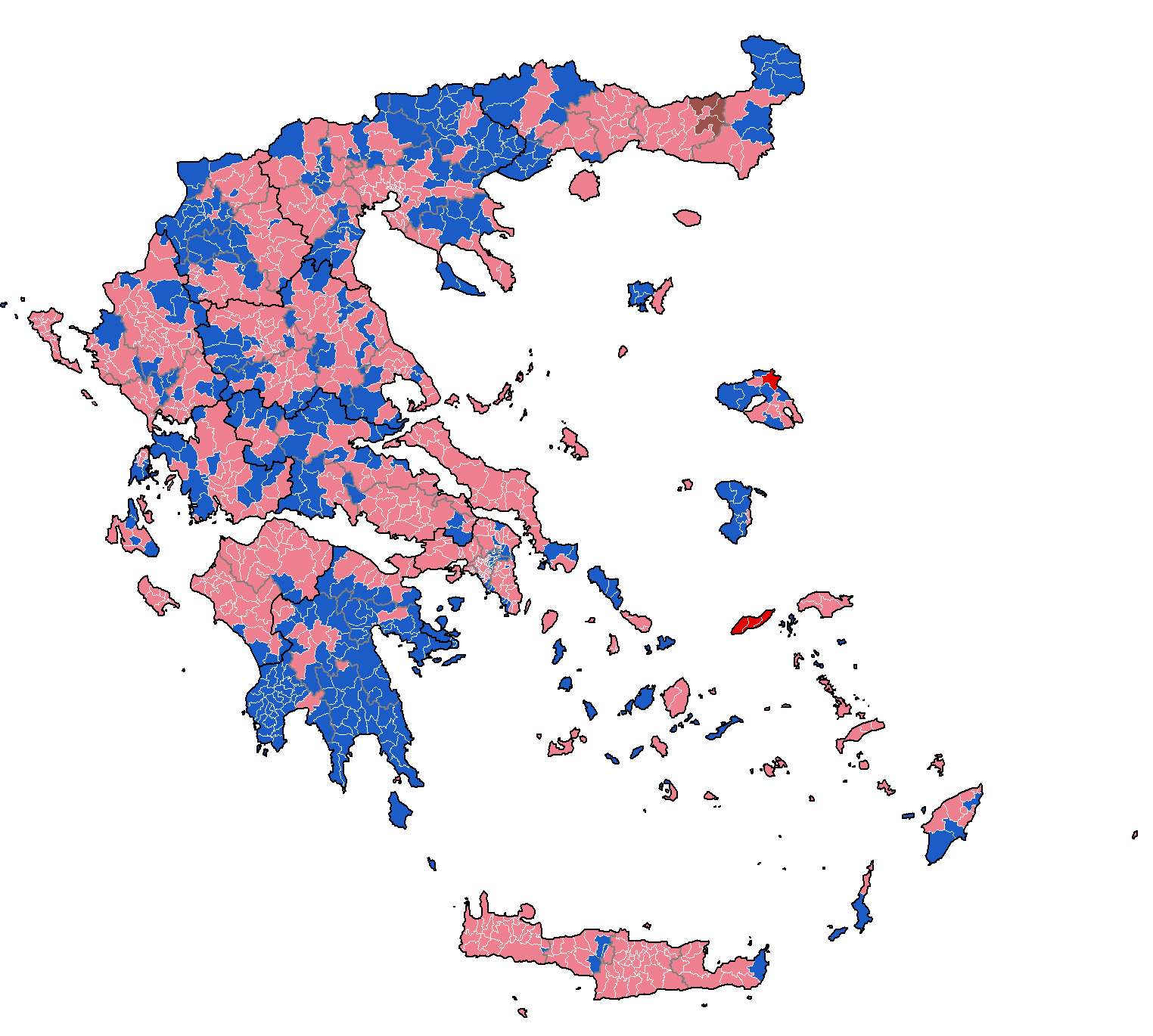
Results, showing the winning party in each municipal unit. SYRIZA (625) ND (392) KKE (4) Potami (3)

Party	Votes	%	+/–	Seats	+/–
Syriza	1,926,526	35.46	–0.88	145	–4
New Democracy	1,526,400	28.09	+0.28	75	–1
Golden Dawn	379,722	6.99	+0.71	18	+1
Democratic Alignment	341,732	6.29	+1.13	17	+4
Communist Party of Greece	301,684	5.55	+0.08	15	0
The River	222,349	4.09	–1.96	11	–6
Independent Greeks	200,532	3.69	–1.06	10	–3
Union of Centrists	186,644	3.44	+1.65	9	+9
Popular Unity	155,320	2.86	New	0	New
Antarsya–Workers Revolutionary Party	46,183	0.85	+0.17	0	0
United Popular Front	41,626	0.77	New	0	New
Society	35,594	0.66	New	0	New
Recreate Greece	28,909	0.53	New	0	New
Democrats–Society of Values–Pirate Party	15,282	0.28	New	0	New
Marxist–Leninist Communist Parties (KKE (m–l)/M–L KKE)	8,873	0.16	+0.03	0	0
Patriotic Union–Greek Popular Gathering	6,070	0.11	New	0	New
Greek People's Democratic Liberation	4,421	0.08	±0.00	0	0
Organisation of Internationalist Communists	2,433	0.04	+0.01	0	0
Organisation for the Reconstruction of the KKE	2,230	0.04	New	0	New
Independents	846	0.02	±0.00	0	0
Total	5,433,376	100.00	–	300	0
Valid votes	5,433,376	97.58			
Invalid/blank votes	134,554	2.42			
Total votes	5,567,930	100.00			
Registered voters/turnout	9,913,609	56.16			
Source: Ministry of Interior

=== By region ===
Constituency	SYRIZA		ND		XA		DISY (Note: Compared to PASOK and DIMAR)		KKE		River		ANEL		EK		LAE	
Constituency	%	±	%	±	%	±	%	±	%	±	%	±	%	±	%	±	%	±
Achaea	41.47	▼1.60	22.37	▲1.78	5.55	▲0.73	7.63	▲3.23	5.82	▲0.31	3.37	▼1.96	4.42	▼1.43	2.64	▲1.39	3.48	New
Aetolia-Akarnania	35.12	▼1.40	30.71	▲1.50	7.00	▲0.58	8.49	▲2.08	6.05	▲0.39	2.52	▼1.61	2.63	▼0.68	1.95	▲1.12	2.51	New
Argolis	29.51	▼2.78	33.72	▼0.04	8.55	▲1.23	9.59	▲2.59	4.24	▲0.65	3.37	▼1.65	2.51	▼0.40	2.40	▲1.34	2.88	New
Arkadia	30.67	▲0.54	33.81	▼2.32	6.75	▲0.92	9.91	▲1.34	4.90	▲0.55	3.12	▼1.83	2.76	▲0.11	2.48	▲1.40	2.59	New
Arta	40.76	▼3.38	30.77	▲0.73	4.21	▲0.45	7.08	▲1.56	5.72	▲0.61	2.20	▼1.17	2.31	▼0.18	1.89	▲1.16	2.62	New
Athens A	31.55	▼2.06	31.12	▲1.05	6.91	▼0.14	4.68	▲0.62	5.83	▼0.21	5.73	▼1.50	3.37	▼1.03	3.39	▲1.71	3.57	New
Athens B	35.21	▼1.88	27.38	▲1.72	5.64	▼0.09	4.64	▲0.67	6.80	▼0.13	5.59	▼2.08	3.87	▼1.03	3.61	▲1.83	3.13	New
Attica	36.47	▼0.62	27.11	▲1.20	8.68	▲0.24	4.08	▲0.64	5.16	▼0.20	4.36	▼1.76	4.29	▼1.64	3.14	▲1.74	2.86	New
Boeotia	37.69	▼3.86	23.30	▲0.61	7.70	▲1.05	6.66	▲2.01	7.00	▲0.04	3.47	▼1.10	3.76	▼1.07	2.35	▲1.29	4.44	New
Cephalonia	33.95	▼4.30	27.55	▼1.37	7.38	▲1.33	5.75	▲0.81	10.12	▲0.78	3.49	▼0.40	2.31	▼1.36	2.59	▲1.59	3.36	New
Chalkidiki	32.90	▼0.61	33.29	▲0.29	7.22	▲0.98	7.06	▼0.51	3.29	▲0.06	3.06	▼1.48	3.60	▼1.61	4.15	▲1.52	2.46	New
Chania	41.67	▼1.40	19.40	▼0.41	6.12	▲1.83	6.57	▲3.09	5.45	▲0.65	6.27	▼5.89	3.67	▼2.08	2.45	▲1.26	3.99	New
Chios	27.91	▲0.80	32.58	▼6.31	5.82	▲1.13	13.11	▲5.47	5.03	▼0.50	3.66	▼2.66	3.11	▲0.68	3.21	▲1.97	2.69	New
Corfu	40.59	▼4.32	22.19	▲0.30	7.55	▲1.85	5.69	▲1.39	7.06	▲0.13	2.99	▼1.84	3.17	▼2.39	2.75	▲1.56	5.03	New
Corinthia	35.04	▼1.73	29.65	▼0.18	8.66	▲1.37	6.96	▲1.86	3.09	▲0.14	3.28	▼2.24	3.35	▼0.78	3.19	▲1.51	3.02	New
Cyclades	33.68	▼1.44	31.28	▼0.31	6.19	▲1.12	6.84	▲1.35	4.44	▲0.29	3.99	▼2.77	3.39	▼1.60	3.47	▲1.93	3.10	New
Dodecanese	34.54	▲1.28	28.13	▼4.46	8.05	▲2.52	9.49	▲1.00	3.40	▲0.06	3.03	▼1.83	4.48	▼0.84	3.00	▲1.59	2.65	New
Drama	29.72	▲3.03	31.87	▼2.64	7.09	▲1.10	8.55	▲0.62	3.10	▲0.06	5.79	▼2.55	3.68	▼1.37	4.34	▲1.91	2.38	New
Elis	37.31	▼0.58	26.92	▲0.02	7.59	▲1.55	10.75	▲2.13	4.62	▲0.45	2.19	▼1.61	3.23	▼0.52	1.97	▲1.25	2.95	New
Euboea	39.94	▼0.57	23.97	▲0.27	7.93	▲0.97	6.53	▲0.96	5.39	▲0.41	3.24	▼2.03	3.96	▼1.17	2.95	▲1.74	2.88	New
Evros	31.87	▲5.18	33.70	▼3.38	8.71	▲1.21	6.83	▼0.14	2.96	▼0.30	3.03	▼2.33	4.98	▼0.34	3.23	▲1.50	1.58	New
Evrytania	33.47	▼3.66	34.33	▲1.63	4.70	▲0.32	9.60	▲4.76	2.94	▲0.04	4.48	▼2.51	2.28	▼0.94	2.23	▲1.22	2.17	New
Florina	37.84	▲1.55	30.28	▼4.74	6.74	▲1.73	6.11	▲0.81	4.31	▲0.55	2.55	▼1.01	3.50	▼0.44	2.80	▲1.42	2.69	New
Grevena	34.51	▲3.03	32.15	▼1.01	5.61	▼0.22	9.36	▲0.85	6.24	▼0.49	2.83	▼0.98	2.87	▲0.25	2.73	▲1.52	1.41	New
Heraklion	45.21	▼2.64	20.33	▲1.80	3.94	▲1.13	9.72	▲3.36	4.24	▲0.35	4.00	▼3.87	3.46	▼0.91	2.20	▲1.20	2.69	New
Imathia	34.28	▲0.34	27.56	▼1.31	9.26	▲1.78	6.83	▲1.20	5.14	▲0.22	2.90	▼2.11	3.57	▼1.81	3.96	▲1.44	3.15	New
Ioannina	39.52	▼0.05	28.33	▲0.10	4.75	▲0.41	7.36	▲1.26	5.50	▼0.04	3.55	▼1.94	2.52	▼0.64	2.53	▲1.33	2.29	New
Karditsa	35.74	▼3.17	30.85	▲0.83	7.34	▲0.92	7.16	▲1.71	6.48	▲0.47	2.45	▼1.15	2.90	▼0.44	2.36	▲1.53	1.94	New
Kastoria	28.96	▲1.88	36.94	▼1.84	8.56	▲0.89	6.04	▲0.94	3.07	▼0.56	3.49	▼1.75	3.74	▼0.34	4.21	▲2.21	2.27	New
Kavala	32.40	▲1.13	31.05	▼0.16	7.80	▲0.69	6.95	▲0.34	4.36	▲0.09	3.13	▼2.41	4.17	▼1.70	4.31	▲1.74	2.75	New
Kilkis	30.89	▲1.40	32.41	▼0.60	9.47	▲0.87	7.06	▼0.21	5.98	▲0.04	2.20	▼1.49	3.09	▼1.05	4.20	▲1.54	1.92	New
Kozani	33.86	▲0.75	27.89	▼0.24	6.20	▲0.91	7.78	▲0.95	5.43	▲0.19	3.32	▼2.43	5.22	▼1.51	3.58	▲1.50	2.79	New
Laconia	23.07	▼3.44	37.54	▲1.75	11.44	▲0.97	12.41	▲1.11	4.10	▲0.14	2.47	▼1.19	2.34	▼0.40	1.95	▲1.24	2.18	New
Larissa	34.93	▼1.21	27.99	▲0.84	7.05	▲0.60	6.25	▲1.36	7.25	▲0.32	3.54	▼2.20	3.87	▼0.45	3.25	▲1.85	2.44	New
Lasithi	39.19	▼4.31	25.98	▲1.14	3.95	▲1.14	11.34	▲4.39	3.26	▲0.35	4.66	▼3.37	2.39	▼0.76	2.12	▲1.20	3.49	New
Lefkada	30.68	▼5.32	32.00	▲3.11	5.27	▲0.59	7.87	▲2.42	10.48	▲0.94	2.57	▼1.85	2.38	▼1.19	2.16	▲1.18	3.33	New
Lesbos	29.02	▼3.92	28.55	▼1.84	7.78	▲3.12	7.69	▲2.08	10.68	▼0.13	3.32	▼0.94	4.34	▼0.96	2.34	▲1.41	3.13	New
Magnesia	36.06	▼4.22	26.18	▲1.21	8.46	▲1.56	4.79	▲0.70	6.24	▲0.61	3.28	▼1.15	4.16	▼1.11	2.99	▲1.68	3.32	New
Messenia	30.50	▼1.26	35.46	▼2.50	8.10	▲0.90	5.94	▲1.27	5.43	▲0.49	2.89	▼1.16	2.39	▼0.29	2.73	▲1.78	3.34	New
Pella	33.26	▲1.14	31.55	▼2.47	9.42	▲1.86	6.69	▲0.53	3.65	▲0.16	2.28	▼2.23	2.89	▼0.82	4.80	▲2.14	2.28	New
Phocis	32.98	▼1.79	32.16	▲0.40	7.10	▲0.55	6.54	▲1.14	6.24	▲0.31	3.04	▼1.08	3.33	▼0.69	2.15	▲1.16	2.54	New
Phthiotis	34.62	▼1.11	31.05	▲1.96	7.77	▲1.53	6.73	▲2.80	4.78	▲0.53	2.82	▼1.15	3.67	▼2.40	2.27	▲1.33	3.09	New
Pieria	32.43	▲2.42	32.68	▼1.39	7.43	▼0.39	6.62	▲1.33	4.45	▲0.20	2.75	▼1.22	3.84	▼1.72	4.27	▲1.80	2.89	New
Piraeus A	33.63	▼0.77	29.45	▼0.15	7.82	▲0.38	4.40	▲0.59	5.14	▼0.13	4.21	▼2.15	4.25	▼1.08	4.37	▲2.53	2.96	New
Piraeus B	42.02	▼0.04	18.32	▼0.65	8.40	▲0.60	4.02	▲0.44	7.94	▼0.24	3.15	▼2.38	4.70	▼0.86	3.77	▲2.00	3.77	New
Preveza	35.45	▼2.49	32.45	▲0.68	5.08	▲0.45	8.02	▲2.26	6.76	▲0.57	3.16	▼1.18	2.16	▼0.60	1.73	▲0.93	2.43	New
Rethymno	38.13	▼1.42	27.37	▲2.64	4.04	▲0.93	10.31	▲3.59	3.37	▲0.16	4.89	▼4.57	2.60	▼1.98	2.19	▲1.23	2.70	New
Rhodope	39.35	▼9.18	22.74	▲2.18	5.46	▲0.57	4.56	▲0.97	2.08	▲0.24	17.08	▲5.38	3.31	▲0.63	2.04	▲1.23	1.23	New
Samos	31.01	▼5.16	22.48	▼2.37	7.66	▲2.12	6.06	▲1.36	16.14	▲1.06	2.44	▼1.51	5.45	▲1.80	2.43	▲1.29	3.05	New
Serres	29.08	▲2.84	35.21	▼2.23	7.91	▲1.48	7.00	▲0.39	3.64	▼0.14	3.37	▼2.34	4.95	▼0.55	4.13	▲1.99	1.85	New
Thesprotia	37.12	▲1.22	31.39	▼6.22	4.72	▲1.04	9.16	▲3.25	4.44	▲0.68	3.10	▼1.21	2.33	▼0.10	2.03	▲1.22	2.41	New
Thessaloniki A	35.81	▲1.69	25.29	▲0.45	7.27	▲0.20	4.32	▼0.45	5.31	▼0.30	4.84	▼2.16	3.86	▼1.72	6.78	▲1.66	2.69	New
Thessaloniki B	32.88	▲1.24	29.50	▲0.28	8.44	▲0.53	4.74	▼0.09	4.81	▼0.23	3.86	▼2.14	3.88	▼2.01	6.01	▲1.96	2.33	New
Trikala	35.80	▼0.36	30.81	▼1.79	5.65	▲1.01	7.34	▲2.58	7.11	▲0.34	3.06	▼1.00	2.85	▼0.19	2.73	▲1.64	1.84	New
Xanthi	49.61	▲4.18	23.83	▲0.27	5.59	▲0.80	4.10	▼2.71	2.64	▲0.25	2.73	▼1.78	3.91	▼0.15	2.98	▲1.67	1.45	New
Zakynthos	36.16	▼6.83	27.51	▲3.51	6.73	▲1.94	6.46	▲2.05	10.20	▲1.53	2.74	▼4.78	1.86	▼0.87	1.82	▲1.21	3.96	New

== Aftermath ==
The governing party SYRIZA won the largest number of seats but fell short of an outright majority. However, the party resurrected its coalition with the right-wing Independent Greeks, a minor party with which it had already formed a government after the January 2015 election. Centre-right New Democracy took the second-largest vote share, while far-right Golden Dawn was a fairly distant third. Popular Unity, the party formed by 26 MPs who had defected from SYRIZA in protest at the bailout, failed to reach the 3% threshold, and thus did not get any seats.

SYRIZA leader Alexis Tsipras hailed the result as a "victory of the people". He returned to the premiership after resigning earlier in the summer in order to force the new election. He told supporters in Athens that Greece would "continue the struggle we began seven months ago" when SYRIZA was first elected to government. New Democracy leader Vangelis Meimarakis swiftly conceded after the election results began coming in, calling upon Tsipras "to create the government which is needed". Tsipras' former finance minister Yanis Varoufakis criticised the election result as "the 'legalisation' of the capitulation", referring to the bailout deal negotiated between Athens and European creditors during the summer.

The margin of SYRIZA's "decisive" victory was a surprise, with many pundits and analysts predicting a closer race with New Democracy. Voter turnout was 7 pp lower than it had been in January.
