= 2024 Syriza leadership election =

2024 SYRIZA leadership election
- 24 November 2024
- Turnout: 70,152
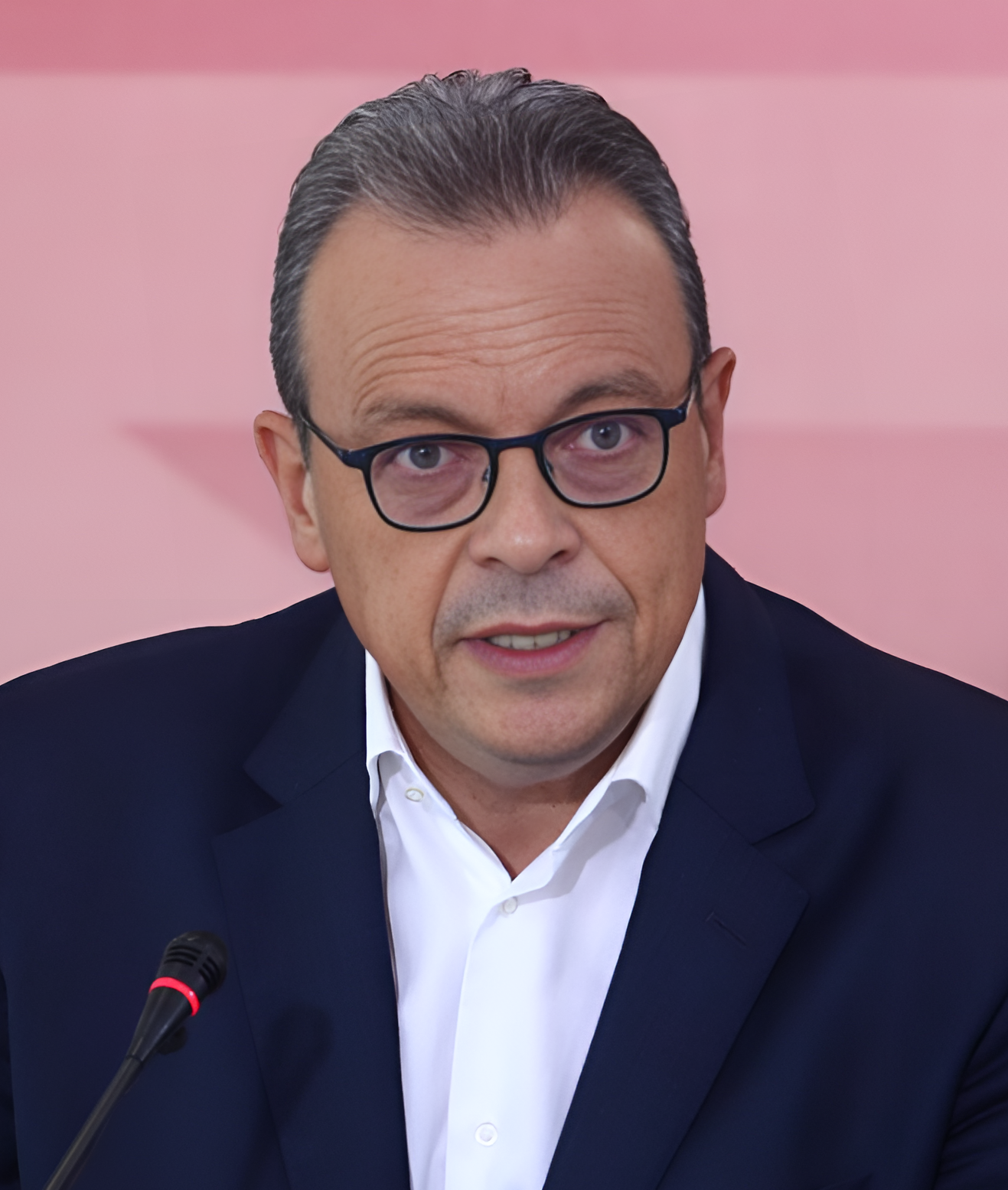

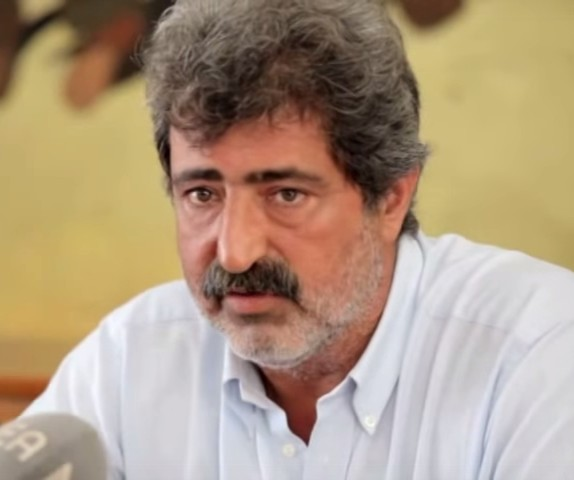

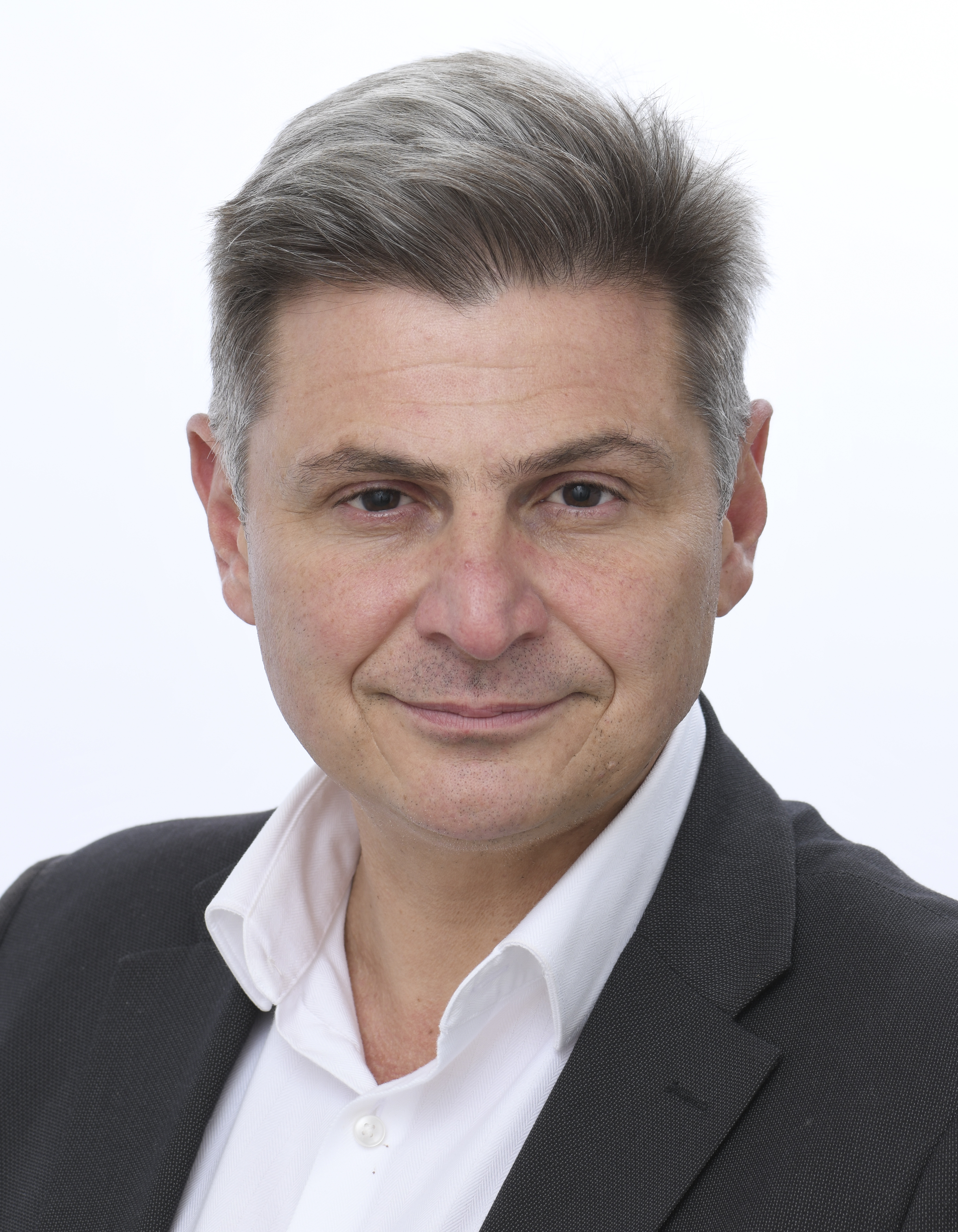
Candidate	Sokratis Famellos	Pavlos Polakis
First round	34,305 (49.4%)	30,281 (43.6%)
Second round	Unopposed	Withdrew
Candidate	Nikolas Farantouris	Apostolos Gkletsos
First round	3,531 (5.1%)	1.383 (1.9%)
Second round	Eliminated	Eliminated
President of
SYRIZA before election
Vacant (Note: After the motion of no-confidence against Stefanos Kasselakis, the political secretariat acted as the highest executive organ of the party.)
Elected President of
SYRIZA
Sokratis Famellos

A leadership election was held on 24 November 2024. The winner was Sokratis Famellos, an MP of Syriza and former leader of the parliamentary group. In second place, with a small gap to the winner, was the MP from Chania, Pavlos Polakis, who said that he did not want a second round. These elections — the most tumultuous in Syriza's history — were marked by the decision of the party's supreme bodies to reject the possibility of former Syriza president Stefanos Kasselakis running, a decision that caused fierce disputes among the party's executives and grassroots members.

About 70,000 voters who were already registered members of the party voted (in the immediately preceding elections 147,000 people who could register on the same day had voted), a figure that SYRIZA officials described as a success under the circumstances.

== Background ==
=== Previous leadership election ===
After Alexis Tsipras resigned as the President of Syriza, in June 2023 a leadership election was called.

On the first round of the elections, Stefanos Kasselakis and Effie Achtsioglou made it to the second round, with 44.9% and 36.2% of the votes respectively, Euclid Tsakalotos reached the third spot with 8.9%, Nikos Pappas followed with 8.7%, and finally Stefanos Tzoumakas got 1.3%.

On the second round, Kasselakis won over Achtsioglou, 56% to 44%.

=== Internal party crisis ===
After the election of Stefanos Kasselakis, the criticism and questioning of his political actions by party members and MPs intensified. Soon, the internal opposition groups "Umbrella" and "6+6" left the party, founding, some time later, New Left.

In February 2024, the 4th Congress of the party was held. Stefanos Kasselakis announced extraordinary party-wide (President, Central Committee, Prefectural Committees, Membership organizations) elections, with Olga Gerovassili announcing her candidacy. In the end, the elections did not take place and tensions were averted in view of the upcoming European elections.

In the European elections, Syriza maintained second place, but with a lower percentage (14.92%) and elected four MEPs. This, combined with sudden replacements of party individuals, changes to the party structure and the suspension of the daily edition of I Avgi, exacerbated the discontent within the party.

The questioning of Stefanos Kasselakis culminated in the meeting of the Central Committee of Syriza, on 7 September, during which 100 members submitted a motion of no confidence against the party president, which was adopted by 163 votes to 120, removing the president, Stefanos Kasselakis, and triggering a leadership election.

On 11 September, the date of the election was effectively decided in a meeting of the political bureau of the party, with the final decision pending upon the meeting of the central committee. Before the elections, on 1-3 November, an extraordinary congress will take place, where all the candidacies will be presented. On 12 October, the Central Committee of the party decided that Kasselakis cannot be candidate. On 8 November, after the new rejection of his candidacy by party's conference, Kasselakis left Syriza and announced the foundation of a new party. A day later, the party's Extraordinary Congress voted to confirm the candidacies of Polakis, Famellos, Farantouris and Gletsos.

== Candidates ==
The following candidatures were confirmed by the Central Committee and the party's Extraordinary Congress:

Candidate	Political Experience	Announcement	Refs
Pavlos Polakis (59 years old)	MP for Chania (2015–present); Other positions: List: Alternate Minister of Health (2015–2019); Deputy Minister of Interior and administrative reorganization of Greece (2015); Mayor of Sfakia (2011–2015); Endorsementsː List: Nikos Pappas Member of the European Parliament; Lefteris Kretsos former Minister of Digital Policy, Telecommunications and Media; Ioannis Mouzalas former Minister for Immigration Policy	7 September 2024	
Sokratis Famellos (58 years old)	MP for Thessaloniki B (2015–present); Other positions: List: Alternate Minister for Environment and Energy (2016–2019); Leader of the Opposition (2023–2024); Leader of Syriza in the Hellenic Parliament (2023–2024); Endorsementsː	26 September 2024	
Nikolas Farantouris (48 years old)	Member of the European Parliament (July 2024); Other positions: List: Candidate for MP of Cephalonia in 2023 elections; Endorsements:	1 October 2024	
Apostolos Gkletsos (57 years old)	Former mayor of Stylida (2011–2019); Other positions: List: Regional councilor of Central Greece with SYRIZA (2023-); Endorsementsː	5 October 2024	

Rejected candidates

Candidate	Political Experience	Announcement	Refs
Stefanos Kasselakis (36 years old)	Former President of Syriza (Note: Kasselakis insisted he remained SYRIZA president till he withdrew from the party.) (September 2023 – September 2024); Other positions: List: Candidate for nationwide MP in 2023 elections; Endorsements: List: Theodora Tzakri secretary of the Syriza parliamentary group; Rallia Christidou MP	3 October 2024	

== Opinion polls ==
The results of the polls are listed in the table below in reverse chronological order, showing the most recent first, using the date of publication. Polls show data collected by polling companies among SYRIZA - Progressive Alliance voters/supporters and the general population as well.

Poll conducted on SYRIZA voters
Poll conducted on those who will vote on the leadership election / the general population

Source	Date	Famellos	Polakis	Farantouris	Gkletsos	Kasselakis (Note: Kasselakis was barred from running by the Central Committee and departed from SYRIZA.)	Other	DK/DA (Note: Do not know/Do not answer)	Undecideds	Lead
Results	24 Nov	49.36	43.57	5.08	1.99	-	0.93 (Note: Blanks/Invalids)	-	-	5.79
Opinion Poll	13 Nov	26.2	20.7	6.9	6.9	-	28,3 (Note: "None of the above")	11 (Note: "Not interested": 4.1)	-	5.5
Marc (Note: First scenario: 2023 SYRIZA voters. Second scenario: Inclined to vote for SYRIZA in the next elections.)	29 Oct	20.9	14.2	6.1	4.1	34.1 (Note: Scenario: Kasselakis had not been barred from running.)	15.1	5.5	-	13.2
Marc	29 Oct	14.3	11.4	4.5	5,0	52.9 (Note: Scenario: Kasselakis had not been barred from running.)	8.7	3.3	-	38,6
MRB	25 Oct	23.5	19.1	5.8	6.7	28.3 (Note: Scenario: Kasselakis had not been barred from running.)	9.4 (Note: "Nobody": 8.6)	7.1	-	4.8
MRB	25 Oct	24.9	17.1	3.5	8.4	32.6 (Note: Scenario: Kasselakis had not been barred from running.)	7.6 (Note: "Nobody": 7.6)	5.9	-	7.7
MRB	25 Oct	23.4	26.9	9.3	10.2	-	22.1 (Note: "Nobody": 7.6)	8.1	-	3.5
MRB	25 Oct	22.6	26.6	9.6	14.5	-	19.3 (Note: "Nobody": 7.6)	7.5	-	4.0
Interview	3 Oct	29.0	14.0	3.0	-	38.0 (Note: Scenario: Kasselakis had not been barred from running.)	-	9.0	7.0	9.0
Opinion Poll	30 Sep	25.8	14.0	2.2	4.8	43.5 (Note: Scenario: Kasselakis had not been barred from running.)	8.1 (Note: "None of the above")	1.6	-	17.7
Opinion Poll	30 Sep	26.3	14.0	8.6	3.3	21.1 (Note: Scenario: Kasselakis had not been barred from running.)	21.0 (Note: "None of the above")	5.7	-	5.2

== Results ==
2024 SYRIZA leadership election results summary
Candidates	Votes	%
Sokratis Famellos	34,305	49.36
Pavlos Polakis	30,281	43.57
Nikolas Farantouris	3,531	5.08
Apostolos Gkletsos	1,383	1.99
Valid votes	69,500	99.07
Blank/Invalid votes	652	0.93
Total	70,152	100%
Source: Results
