= Second Shadow Cabinet of Alexis Tsipras =

The Second Shadow Cabinet of Alexis Tsipras was formed on 18 July 2019, following the 2019 Greek legislative election. It consists of only Syriza MPs, as it is the largest party in opposition to the Kyriakos Mitsotakis Government.

== History ==
The Shadow Cabinet was formed on 18 July 2019, with the composition being announced that day. The Shadow Cabinet is acting in opposition to the Mitsotakis Government.

== Role of shadow ministers ==
The role of shadow ministers is to oversee the work being carried out by the government ministers and to offer alternative proposals.

== Shadow Cabinet composition ==
- Leader of the Opposition and Leader of Syriza – Alexis Tsipras
- Shadow Minister for Foreign Affairs – George Katrougalos
  - Deputy for European Issues: Sia Anagnostopoulou
- Shadow Minister of Finance – Euclid Tsakalotos
  - Deputies: Katerina Papanatsiou, Tryfon Alexiadis
- Shadow Minister for the Interior – Christos Spirtzis
  - Deputy: Pavlos Polakis
  - Deputy for Macedonia-Thrace Issues: Theodora Augeri
- Shadow Development and Investment Minister – Nikos Pappas
  - Deputy: Giorgos Tsipras
- Shadow Labour Minister – Effie Achtsioglou
  - Deputy: Theano Fotiou
- Shadow Minister for Citizen Protection – Giannis Ragousis
  - Deputy for Migration Policy: Giorgos Psyxogios
- Shadow Minister for Energy – Sokratis Famellos
  - Deputy for Environmental Issues: Chara Kafantari
- Shadow Health Minister – Andreas Xanthos
  - Deputy: Andreas Mixahlidis
- Shadow Education Minister – Nikos Filis
  - Deputy: Meropi Tzoufi
- Shadow Tourism Minister – Katerina Notopoulou
- Shadow Minister for National Defence – Thodoris Dritsas
- Shadow Justice Minister – Spyros Lappas
- Shadow Culture and Sports Minister – Panos Skouyoliakos
  - Deputy for Sports Issues: Giannis Bournous
- Shadow Shipping Minister – Nektarios Santorinios
- Shadow Infrastructure and Transport Minister – Giorgos Varemenos
  - Deputy for Transportation Issues: Theopisti Perka
- Shadow Digital Policy Minister – Marios Katsis
- Shadow Agriculture Development Minister – Spyros Araxovitis
  - Deputy: Vasilis Kokkalis
- Coordinator of the Commission of Oversight of Government Policy – Alexandros Flampouraris

As of 18 July 2019
