= Alexis Haritsis =

Greek politician

- Αλέξης Χαρίτσης
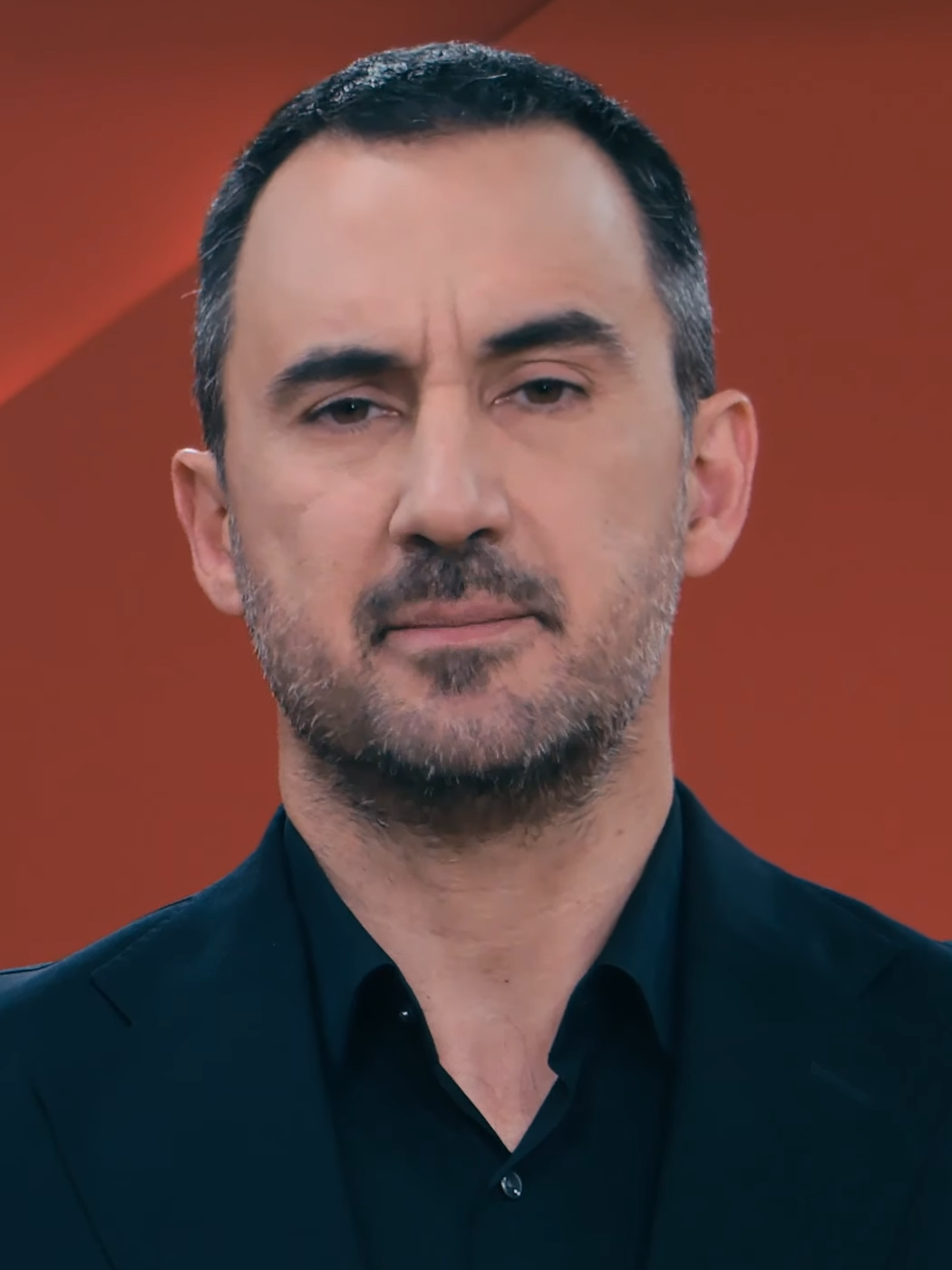
- Haritsis in 2023

President of New Left
- In office 10 November 2024 – 24 March 2026
- Preceded by: Office established
- Succeeded by: Gabriel Sakellaridis

Member of the Hellenic Parliament
- Incumbent
- Assumed office 7 July 2019

Minister of Interior
- In office 29 August 2018 – 13 June 2019
- Prime Minister: Alexis Tsipras
- Preceded by: Panos Skourletis
- Succeeded by: Antonis Roupakiotis

Deputy Minister for Economic Affairs of Greece
- In office 5 November 2016 – 29 August 2018
- Prime Minister: Alexis Tsipras

Deputy Minister for Economy, Development and Tourism
- In office 23 September 2015 – 5 November 2016
- Prime Minister: Alexis Tsipras
- Preceded by: None
- Succeeded by: Stergios Pitsiorlas

Personal details
- Born: 10 August 1977 (age 49) Kalamata, Greece
- Citizenship: Greece
- Party: Independent (2026–present)
- Other political affiliations: SYN (2008–2013); Syriza (2013–2023); New Left (2023–2026)
- Education: National Technical University of Athens
- Occupation: Electrical engineer

Alexis Haritsis (born 10 August 1977) is a Greek politician, Member of the Hellenic Parliament since 2019 and was President of New Left since 2024, until his resignation in 2026.

He studied electrical engineering, specialising in Renewable Energy Sources and participated in left-wing formations, organising from 2008 in Synaspismos and then in SYRIZA. From 2015 to 2019, he served successively as Deputy Minister of Economy, Deputy Minister of Economy and Development and Minister of Interior in the Syriza government. He was elected as an MP with SYRIZA in the 2019 and 2023 elections. He was one of the SYRIZA central committee members that left Syriza to form New Left in 2023.

== Biography ==
He was born in 1977 in Kalamata. He studied at the Department of Electrical and Computer Engineering of the NTUA, and did postgraduate studies at the University of Manchester, specializing in renewable energy.

He organized from his student years in leftist organizations and joined SYN in late 2008.

In the 2006 local elections he was a candidate for the municipal council in Kalamata but failed to get elected. In the 2012 and September 2015 elections he was a candidate with SYRIZA in Messenia. He was a member of the party's Central Committee and one of the participants in the 53+ Movement. He has also served as coordinator of the Energy Sector of SYRIZA.

In the First Cabinet of Alexis Tsipras he served as Secretary General of Public Investment and ESPA at the Ministry of Economy, Infrastructure, Shipping and Tourism.

In the Second Cabinet of Alexis Tsipras he was Deputy Minister of Ministry of Economy, Development and Tourism responsible for ESPA. After the reshuffle of 5 November 2016, he was appointed Deputy Minister of Economy and Development. After the reshuffle of 29 August 2018, he was appointed Minister of Interior, a position he held until 13 June 2019.

In the Parliamentary elections of 2019 he was a candidate in Messenia and was elected with 16,279 votes. On 16 July 2019 he was appointed press representative of SYRIZA and remained in that position until September 2020.

In the May and June 2023 elections he renewed his parliamentary term.

In July 2023 he announced that he would not be a candidate in the 2023 Syriza leadership election and that he supports the candidacy of Efi Achtsioglou.

He was one of the 9 MPs of the "6+6" group around Efi Achtsioglou who became independent from SYRIZA in November 2023 and co-signed a text of 57 members of the Central Committee of SYRIZA who left the party criticizing its new president, Stefanos Kasselakis, that he harms SYRIZA by demonstrating undemocratic behaviour, political contradictions and lack of programmatic discourse.

On 4 December 2023, with the announcement of the formation of the parliamentary group "New Left" by eleven MPs who had left SYRIZA, Haritsis was appointed its president. Haritsis and seven other New Left MPs departed the parliamentary group in June 2026 to sit as independents.
