= 2022 Syriza leadership election =

Election for president of Syriza

- 15 May 2022
- Turnout: 152.193
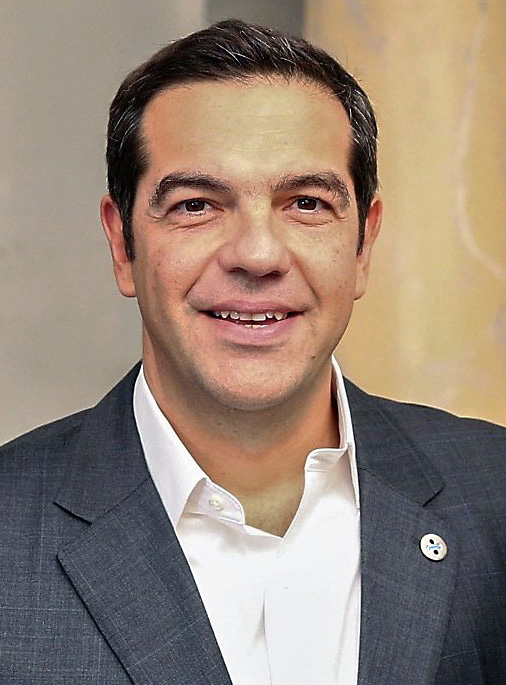
Candidate	Alexis Tsipras
Popular vote	150.853
Percentage	100%
Elected	Unopposed
President before election
Alexis Tsipras
Elected President
Alexis Tsipras

Internal party elections took place within SYRIZA-PS on 15 May 2022, in which the president and the members of the Central Committee were directly elected by the members of the party.

== Background ==
On 19 January 2022, Alexis Tsipras, then president of SYRIZA - PS proposed at a meeting of the party's political council the election of the president and the central committee directly by its members and not by the congress.

At the beginning of April, before the 3rd party congress, the specifications of the electoral procedure to be voted on at the congress were made public. The election for president would be open to all those who registered as members or friends of the party on the same day, while the election for the central committee would be open only to those members who had registered before 21 March 2022.

On 15 April, during the congress, the Internal opposition group "Umbrella" strongly protested against Tsipras' proposal, but it was approved by 70% of the votes.

== Campaign ==
The election process was presented by SYRIZA as a response to the government's response to deal with the issue of inflation, using the slogan "We're sending them back the bill!".

== Results ==
Tsipras was re-elected with 100% of the valid votes, but the remarkable thing, according to him, was the massive participation of 140,000 new members.

== Criticism ==
New Democracy criticized the absence of rival candidates against Alexis Tsipras, as well as the right to vote for people over 15 years old.

== Following developments ==
After the legislative elections of May 2023, where SYRIZA reached its lowest percentage since the legislative elections of May 2012, Alexis Tsipras was pressured to resign from the party leadership, but remained, citing the upcoming June elections.

However, after the renewed defeat at the June elections, and the further drop in vote percentages, he stated on election night that he would put himself up to the judgment of the party members. Although, just four days later, he announced that he would resign from the party leadership, stating that the party requires “deep renewal and refoundation”.

After Tsipras' resignation, Sokratis Famellos, following a vote of the Parliamentary Group of SYRIZA - PS, was unanimously elected president of the PG, until the election of a new party president.

Following the announcement of Alexis Tsipras that he will not run for president of SYRIZA - Progressive Alliance, the following announced their candidacy in chronological order: Effie Achtsioglou on 12 July, Euclid Tsakalotos on 14 July, Stefanos Tzoumakas and Nikos Pappas on 15 July, and Stefanos Kasselakis on 29 August.

The elections were initially set for 10 and 17 September, but were moved a week later respectively due to the Storm Daniel. In the elections, Kasselakis and Achtsioglou made it to the second round, and in the end Kasselakis was elected in the second round.
