= Kaselakis =

Kaselakis or Kasselakis is a surname. Notable people with the surname include:

- Leonidas Kaselakis
- Stefanos Kasselakis
