= Tina Birbili =

Greek politician

Tina Birbili Τίνα Μπιρμπίλη
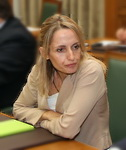

Minister for the Environment, Energy and Climate Change
- In office 7 October 2009 – 17 June 2011
- President: Karolos Papoulias
- Prime Minister: George Papandreou
- Succeeded by: Giorgos Papakonstantinou

Personal details
- Born: 1969 (age 56–57) Athens, Greece
- Party: Panhellenic Socialist Movement
- Education: University of Athens (B.Sc.); Imperial College (M.A., PhD)
- Profession: Physicist

Konstantina Birbili (Greek: Κωνσταντίνα Μπιρμπίλη) (born 1969), commonly known as Tina Birbili, was the Minister for the Environment, Energy and Climate Change of Greece until June 17, 2011. Birbili was the first holder of this office, which was created to succeed the former Ministry for the Environment, Physical Planning and Public Works by Greek prime minister George Papandreou in October 2009.

== Career ==
Birbili had no prior government experience on her appointment, but she had worked as an advisor to prime minister Papandreou during his tenure at the foreign ministry. She was regarded as a strong advocate for environmental issues within the Panhellenic Socialist Movement party.

A physicist by training, Birbili attended the University of Athens and London's Imperial College, obtaining a PhD in 1995.

== See also ==
- List of ministers of climate change

Political offices
New title	Minister for the Environment; 7 October 2009 – 17 June 2011	Succeeded by Giorgos Papakonstantinou
