= Giannis Maniatis (politician) =

Greek politician (born 1956)

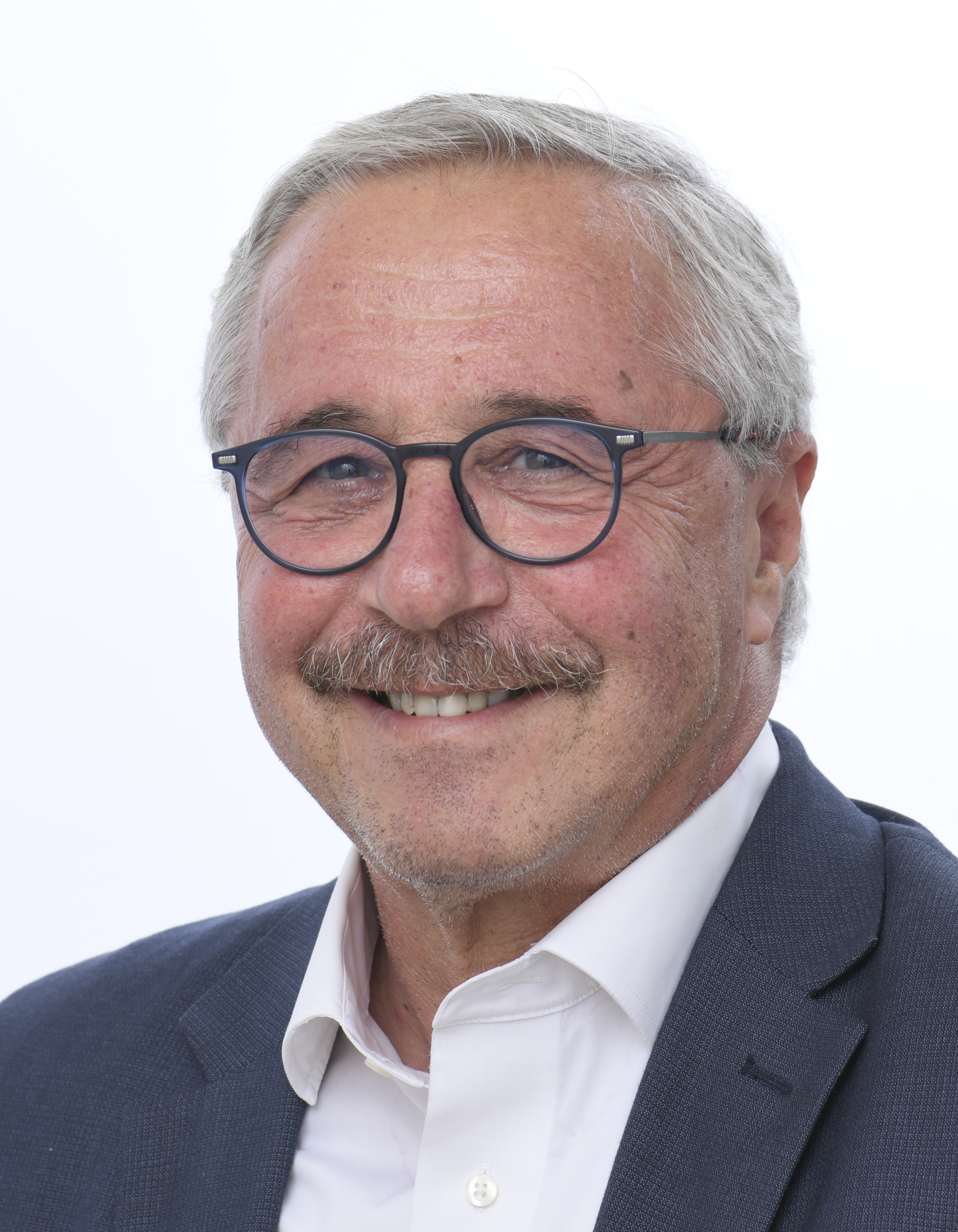
- Maniatis in 2024

Member of the European Parliament for Greece
- Incumbent
- Assumed office 16 July 2024

Member of the Hellenic Parliament
- In office 7 March 2004 – 31 December 2014
- In office 20 September 2015 – 11 June 2019

Minister of the Environment and Energy of Greece
- In office 25 June 2013 – 27 January 2015
- Preceded by: Evangelos Livieratos
- Succeeded by: Panagiotis Lafazanis

Personal details
- Born: 11 October 1956 (age 69)
- Party: PASOK
- Education: National Technical University of Athens

Giannis Maniatis (Greek: Γιάννης Μανιάτης, born 11 October 1956) is a Greek politician. He worked as an engineer and attended at the National Technical University of Athens. He served as a member of the Hellenic Parliament for PASOK from 2004 to 2019, and as Minister of the Environment and Energy of Greece.
