= Giorgos Papakonstantinou =

Greek economist and politician

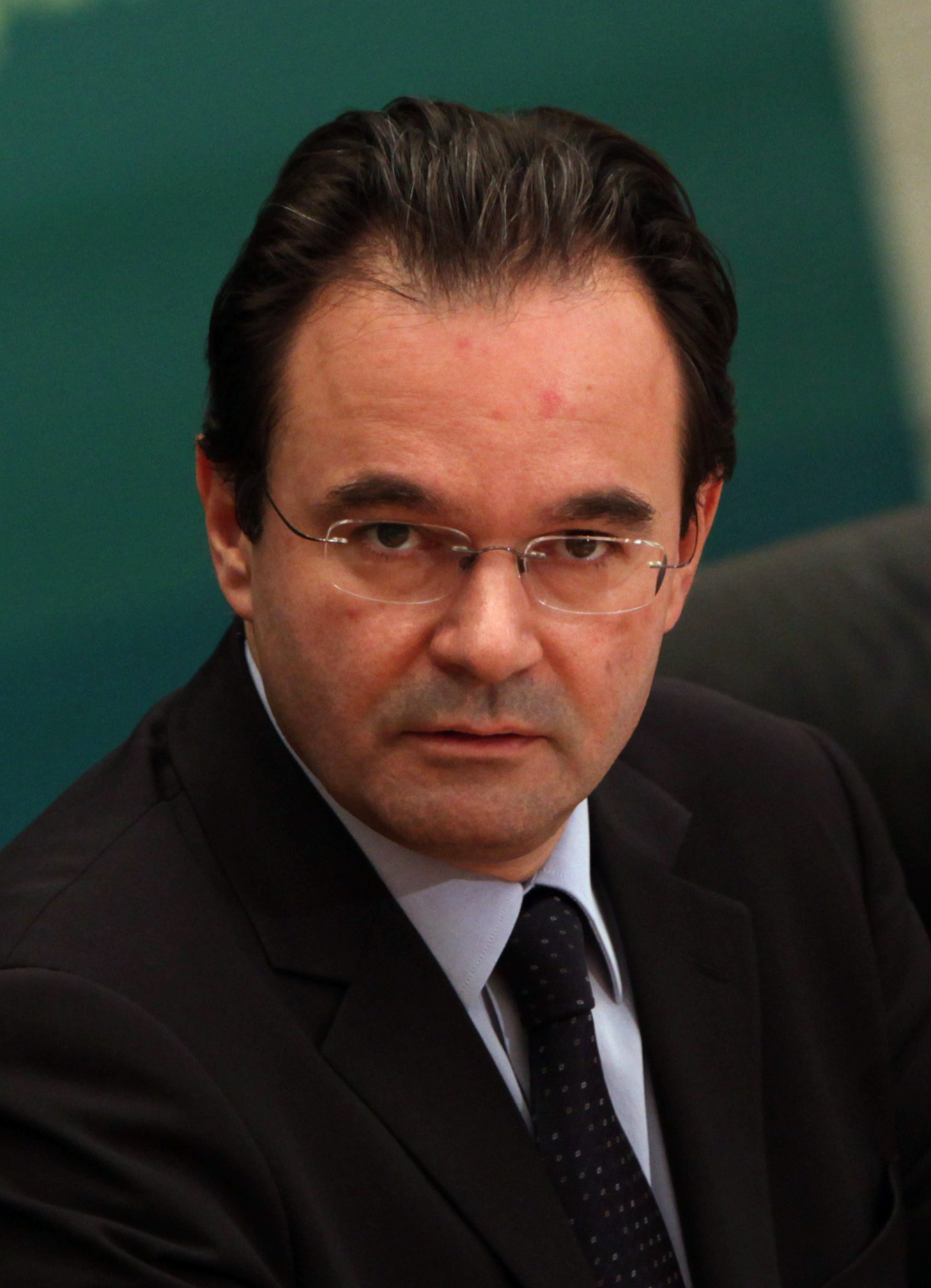

Minister of Environment, Energy and Climate Change
- In office 17 June 2011 – 17 May 2012
- Prime Minister: George Papandreou; Lucas Papademos
- Preceded by: Tina Birbili
- Succeeded by: Gregory Tsaltas

Minister of Finance
- In office 7 October 2009 – 17 June 2011
- Prime Minister: George Papandreou
- Preceded by: Yannis Papathanasiou
- Succeeded by: Evangelos Venizelos

Personal details
- Born: 30 October 1961 (age 64) Athens, Greece
- Party: Panhellenic Socialist Movement
- Spouse: Jacoline Vinke
- Education: London School of Economics; New York University
- Website: Official website

Giorgos Papakonstantínou (Greek: Γιώργος Παπακωνσταντίνου; born 30 October 1961 in Athens, Greece) is a Greek economist and politician and former Minister for the Environment, Energy and Climate Change of Greece and former Minister for Finance. Following expulsion from his party PASOK, he received a one-year suspended sentence for misdemeanours over his handling of the infamous "Lagarde list". The court found him guilty of removing the names of three relatives of about 2,000 Greeks with money overseas. He is currently a professor at the European University Institute.

== Education and career ==
He graduated from the London School of Economics (LSE). He later obtained a Master of Arts in economics from New York University and a PhD in economics from LSE.

After his studies, he worked as a senior economist at the Organisation for Economic Co-operation and Development in Paris from 1988 to 1998.

In 1998, Papakonstantinou returned to Greece and was appointed an adviser to then-Prime Minister Costas Simitis on "information society" issues.

Two years later, he was appointed Special Secretary for the "Information Society" at the Ministry of Economy and Finance (2000–2002). Between 2002 and 2004 he served as a member of the Council of Economic Advisors of the Ministry of Economy and Finance, as a board member of OTE (Hellenic Telecommunication Organization), and as the Greek representative to the European Union's Economic Policy Committee (EPC). In 2003 he coordinated the "Lisbon Strategy" for economic and social reforms during the Greek Presidency of the EU.

Between 2004 and 2007, Papakonstantinou served as economic advisor to George Papandreou, the president of the Panhellenic Socialist Movement (PASOK). He was also a board member of the Institute for Strategic and Development Studies, PASOK's think tank, from 2005 to 2008.

Between 2003 and 2007, Papakonstantinou also taught economics at Department of Management Science and Technology of the Athens University of Economics and Business and advised the European Commission on research and information society issues, participating in various international research projects.

== Political career ==
In May 2005, Papakonstantinou was elected a member of the National Council of PASOK. In September 2007, he was elected member of the Hellenic Parliament to represent the district of Kozani, and was subsequently appointed PASOK's Press Spokesman in March 2008.

Papakonstantinou headed PASOK's list of candidates for the European Parliament in the 2009 European elections and was elected MEP in June 2009. In October 2009 he was appointed Finance Minister in the government formed by Papandreou, the former prime minister, after the national elections.

As Finance Minister, he revealed that the Greek deficit was much larger than what was reported by the previous government, and when Greece was shut out of international markets, he negotiated a €110bn loan agreement for Greece with the EU and the International Monetary Fund, together with a programme of severe fiscal consolidation and structural reforms. During his tenure, he overhauled the budget process, instituting a medium-term fiscal framework with expenditure monitoring and assessment mechanisms, and an independent statistical authority; embarked on tax reform, with legislative and organizational changes to combat tax evasion; implemented a wide-ranging program of structural reforms in product, service and financial markets; and designed a large-scale and wide-ranging privatization strategy. When he left office, the public deficit was more than 6 percentage points of GDP lower than upon his appointment, while Greece had recovered half the competitiveness lost since Eurozone entry and was named the OECD country with the fastest pace of structural reforms.

In June 2011, Prime Minister George Papandreou reshuffled the government and appointed him Minister of Environment, Energy and Climate Change, a post he kept in the government of Lucas Papademos until he handed over to a caretaker Minister in May 2012. In the field of environment, he accelerated the closure of uncontrolled landfills; revamped the waste management and recycling systems; helped implement a large number of water management projects co-funded by EU Structural Funds; advanced the completion of land and urban planning and of the national cadastre. In energy, he brought legislation to liberalize the energy market; oversaw a large increase of Greece's renewable energy capacity and presented a road map for energy policies to 2050; spearheaded ambitious renewable energy projects, such as Project Helios for exporting solar energy; pursued Greek participation in international gas routes; and brought forward the exploration of Greece's hydrocarbon potential.

He was one of a number of Papademos' cabinet who failed to be re-elected in the May 6, 2012 General election that saw PASOK lose almost 120 seats in the house.

=== Legal issues ===
Papakonstantinou has faced a parliamentary investigation into the handling of the so-called Lagarde list, containing information on the deposits of roughly 2,000 Greek citizens at HSBC bank's Geneva branch, which he asked for and received from French authorities in 2010. While Papakonstantinou asked the Greek tax authorities to investigate the list, they failed to do so. In late 2012, prosecutors asked for a fresh copy of the Greek list and compared it to the one they had, they found that three names were missing from the list, all relatives of Papakonstantinou. Those allegations resulted in his expulsion from the PASOK political party. He has consistently denied all charges and claims he is being made a scapegoat for the inaction of others on this issue as well as for the public's need to punish politicians for the austerity policies in Greece. In 2015, a Special Court convened for this case and composed of 13 judges drawn from the two highest Greek courts unanimously cleared him of the breach of faith charge, concluding that there had been no damage to the State from his actions. At the same time, with an 8 to 5 majority by the court, he received a suspended misdemeanour conviction for the tampering charge.

In 2016 he published a book in which he told his story as finance minister of Greece when the debt crisis unfolded.

== Personal life ==
Papakonstantinou is married to travel writer Jacoline Vinke. They have two sons, Nicolas and Stefanos.

Political offices
Preceded by Yannis Papathanasiou	Minister of Finance; 2009–2011	Succeeded by Evangelos Venizelos
Preceded by Tina Birbili	Minister of Environment, Energy and Climate Change; 2011–2012	Succeeded by Gregory Tsaltas
