= Chania (constituency) =

Electoral region of Greece

Location within Greece

Chania (Greek: εκλογική περιφέρεια Χανίων) is a constituency of the Hellenic Parliament. It comprises the Chania Prefecture, and is one of the four constituencies of Crete. It elects four members of Parliament.

== Election results ==
=== Legislative election ===
Chania constituency results

Election	1st party	2nd party	3rd party	4th party	5th party	source
1996	PASOK 51.94%	New Democracy 31.65%	KKE 4.96%	SYN 4.50%	DIKKI 3.06%	
2000	PASOK 52.29%	New Democracy 34.86%	KKE 4.97%	SYN 3.12%	DIKKI 2.85%	
2004	PASOK 48.74%	New Democracy 39.34%	KKE 4.86%	SYRIZA 3.39%	DIKKI 1.39%	
2007	PASOK 44.71%	New Democracy 38.47%	KKE 6.25%	SYRIZA 4.97%	LAOS 2.56%	
2009	PASOK 51.11%	New Democracy 29.73%	KKE 5.98%	SYRIZA 4.37%	LAOS 3.64%	
May 2012	SYRIZA 17.19%	PASOK 13.92%	DYSH 13.40%	ANEL 9.93%	New Democracy 8.44%	
June 2012	SYRIZA 33.77%	New Democracy 20.43%	PASOK 13.76%	ANEL 8.43%	DEMAR 6.93%	
January 2015	SYRIZA 43.10%	New Democracy 19.75%	The River 12.16%	ANEL 5.76%	KKE 4.77%	
September 2015	SYRIZA 41.67%	New Democracy 19.40%	PASOK 6.57%	The River 6.27%	XA 6.12%	
2019	SYRIZA 37.35%	New Democracy 34.05%	PASOK 6.54%	KKE 5.02%	MeRA25 4.85%	
May 2023	New Democracy 41.15%	SYRIZA 20.64%	PASOK 10.92%	KKE 7.19%	Greek Solution 3.47%	
June 2023	New Democracy 41.15%	SYRIZA 20.64%	PASOK 10.92%	KKE 7.19%	Greek Solution 3.47%	
May 2023	New Democracy 40.52%	SYRIZA 18.44%	PASOK 11.21%	KKE 8.42%	Spartans 4.64%	

== Members of Parliament ==
=== Members (July 2019 - today) ===
- Dora Bakoyannis ND
- Manousos Voloudakis ND (Died in 8 Feb 2023, replaced by Ioannis Kasselakis)
- Vassilis Digalakis ND
- Pavlos Polakis SYRIZA

=== Members (Sep 2015 - July 2019) ===
- Giorgos Stathakis SYRIZA
- Pavlos Polakis SYRIZA
- Valia Vagionaki SYRIZA
- Antonis Balomenakis SYRIZA

=== Members (Jan 2015 - Sep 2015) ===
- Giorgos Stathakis SYRIZA
- Pavlos Polakis SYRIZA
- Valia Vagionaki SYRIZA
- Stavros Theodorakis The River

=== Members (Jun 2012 - Jan 2015) ===
- Christos Markogiannakis ND
- Manousos Voloudakis ND
- Kyriakos Virvidakis ND
- Giorgos Stathakis SYRIZA
