= Nikolas Farantouris =

Greek politician

Nikolas Farantouris MEP
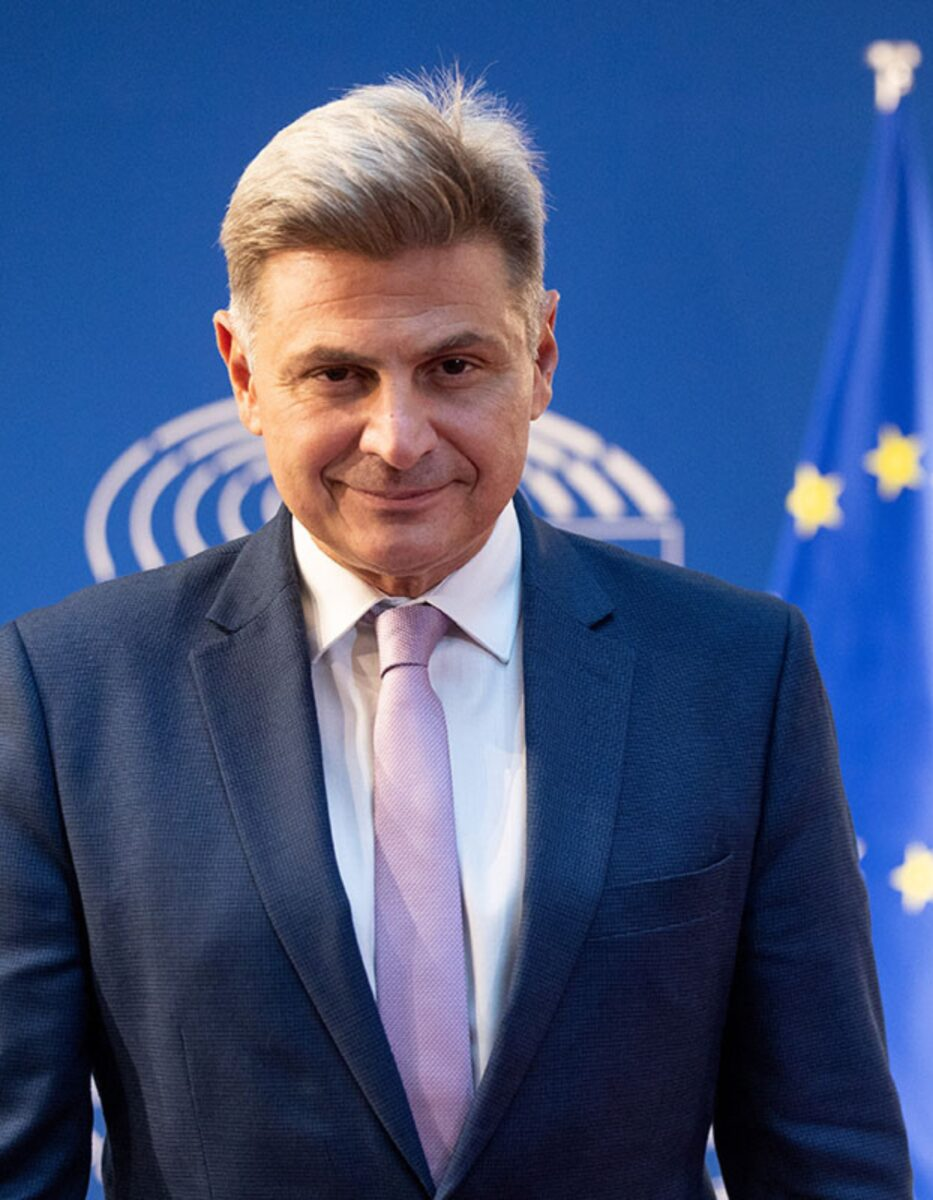

Member of the European Parliament for Greece
- Incumbent
- Assumed office 16 July 2024

Personal details
- Born: 28 January 1976 (age 50) Athens, Greece
- Party: PASOK (since 2026); Independent (2026); Syriza (until 2026)

Nikolas Farantouris (born 28 January 1976) is a Greek academic, lawyer, and politician who has served as a member of the European Parliament since 2024 as a member of the S&D group. He has been a member of PASOK party in Greece since 30 April 2026.

== Early life and education ==
Nikolas Farantouris was born in Athens, Greece. He is a cousin of Maria Farantouri. He holds a law degree with honours from the University of Athens and completed his postgraduate studies at the University of Oxford, where he earned a Master of Jurisprudence (MJur) and a Doctorate (DPhil) in European Law. He was a post-doctoral research fellow at the University of Rotterdam and the University of Dresden.

== Academic career ==
Nikolas Farantouris is a Jean Monnet Professor of European and Energy Law at the Department of International and European Studies, University of Piraeus. He is widely recognized as a distinguished academic specializing in EU business law, competition law, energy law, maritime law, environmental protection, and international trade law. He founded and served for more than 10 years as the Director of the international interdisciplinary MSc Program in Energy Strategy, Law & Economics at the University of Piraeus.

He has authored 12 books and monographs and over 50 scientific articles in peer-reviewed journals and hundreds of articles in newspapers periodical editions. His publications are widely cited and his books published by renowned academic publishers. He has been acknowledged as the “top competition and energy law expert” by World Competition.

== Legal career ==
Nikolas Farantouris has been practicing law since 2001. He worked with Legal & Compliance Department of Goldman Sachs in London and with the international law firm Norton Rose LLP in London, Brussels and Athens, specialising in EU law, anti-trust, shipping law, banking law and energy regulation. He has served as the Member of the Board, Head of Legal and Chairman of the Board of the Public Gas Corporation of Greece (DEPA) SA and Chairman of the Legal Affairs Committee of EUROGAS, the association of energy companies in Europe, contributing to energy policy and market regulation in Europe.

As General Counsel and Chief Legal Adviser of DEPA, Dr. Farantouris played a pivotal role in a landmark international arbitration case before the ICC Arbitration Court in Stockholm. The case involved renegotiating the natural gas supply price with the Turkish energy company BOTAS. Under his leadership, DEPA secured a significant revision of the gas pricing formula based on the weighted average import price in Germany, achieving retroactive compensation of approximately $200 million. The total compensation awarded to DEPA by the court was subsequently paid in full by BOTAS, marking a major victory for the Greek energy sector and setting a precedent in regional energy negotiations.

== Political career ==
Nikolas Farantouris was an active member of the Coalition of the Radical Left (Syriza). In the national elections of May and June 2023, he was a candidate for Syriza in the single-member constituency of Cephalonia.

He again ran for Syriza in the 2024 European Parliament election and was elected one of the party's four MEPs. In the 2024 Syriza leadership election, Farantouris received 3,531 votes (5.1%) and was eliminated.

On 7 January 2026, he was expelled from Syriza after saying that he would "welcome" the establishment of a new political party by Maria Karystianou, a Thessaloniki doctor who lost her daughter in the Tempi train crash and later became a prominent activist for the victims' families. On 30 April 2026, he joined PASOK and the Progressive Alliance of Socialists and Democrats (S&D).

As an MEP, Farantouris serves on key committees, including the Committee on Budgets (BUDG), the Committee on Constitutional Affairs (AFCO) as Co-ordinator, the Committee on the Environment, Public Health and Food Safety (ENVI) and the Committee on Security and Defence (SEDE). He is a member of the Inter-parliamentary Delegation for Relations with the United States (D-US) and the Delegation for Relations with the Pan-African Parliament (DPAP).

He has been a strong advocate for European federalism, for policies supporting small and medium-sized enterprises (SMEs), emphasizing the importance of green and digital transitions, climate change action, EU external relations and global dialogue and sustainable economic growth.

He is a Board Member of the federalist parliamentary forum, Spinelli Group.

== EU Parliamentary activities ==
Elected as a Member of the European Parliament (MEP) in 2024, D. Farantouris serves on key committees in the European Parliament:

- Committee on Budgets (BUDG): Focuses on the preparation and implementation of the EU budget.
- Committee on Constitutional Affairs (AFCO) as coordinator: Addresses institutional matters and treaty revisions.
- Committee on the Environment, Public Health and Food Safety (ENVI)
- Committee on Security and Defence (SEDE)
- Delegation for Relations with the United States (D-US): Enhances transatlantic relations.
- Delegation for Relations with the Pan-African Parliament (DPAP).

In his parliamentary role, Dr. Farantouris has been a vocal advocate for supporting small and medium-sized enterprises (SMEs), emphasizing green and digital transitions, democratic institutions, EU external relations and competence and sustainable economic development.

== Publications ==
Nikolas Farantouris has authored 12 books and monographs and over 50 scientific articles in international pier review journals and periodicals editions focusing on EU law and policy, competition law, energy law and regulation, maritime transport and economic policy.

Key publications include:

- "Η Ενεργειακή Κρίση" (2022) – Published by Papazisi Publications, this book explores the global energy crisis, analyzing its causes and consequences with a focus on policy responses.
- "Energy & Environmental Transformations in a Globalizing World" (2020) – Published by Nomiki Vivliothiki, this book examines global energy and environmental transformations, focusing on their impact on policy, law, and economics. It emphasizes the need for international collaboration and resilient institutional frameworks in addressing energy security, sustainability, and climate change.
- "Δίκαιο της Ενέργειας" (2016) – Published by Nomiki Vivliothiki, this book explores the legal and regulatory framework of Greece’s energy sector.
- "Δίκαιο Υδρογονανθράκων" (2015) – Published by Jean Monnet Chair in Law & Policies & Max-Planck-Institut für Innovation und Wettbewerb Munich, this book examines the legal framework governing all stages of the hydrocarbon value chain, focusing on the intersection of commercial, international, and European law.
- "Ενέργεια: Δίκτυα & Υποδομές" (2014) – Published by NB Publishers, this study discusses the legal, geopolitical, and economic aspects of transnational energy infrastructure.
- "Ενέργεια: Ναυτιλία & Θαλάσσιες Μεταφορές" (2013) – Published by Ant. N. Sakkoulas Publishers, this work analyzes the relationship between energy and maritime transport, focusing on geopolitical and economic dimensions.
- "Ενέργεια: Δίκαιο, Οικονομία & Πολιτική" (2012) – Published by NB Publishers, this book addresses EU energy market integration, competition rules, and energy security.
- "Ο Έλεγχος των Κρατικών Ενισχύσεων Διάσωσης και Αναδιάρθρωσης Προβληματικών Επιχειρήσεων" (2006) – Published by Ant. N. Sakkoulas Publishers, this monograph analyzes the control of state aids in the EU, focusing on the rescue and restructuring of financially troubled companies. It examines the Commission’s approach and its interaction with other core objectives of EU law, with examples from sectors such as air transport, shipbuilding, and textiles.
- "Merger Control and Antitrust Enforcement in the EU and US: A Comparative Analysis" (2003) – Published by European Papers, this comparative study highlights key differences and similarities between EU and US merger control and antitrust enforcement policies.
- "European Integration and Maritime Transport" (2003) – Published by Bryulat Publishers, this monograph examines the effects of European integration on maritime transport and was awarded the Onassis Prize.
- "Judicial Aspects of EU Competition Policy in Air Transport" (2002) – Published by Esperia Publications, this book explores the application of EU competition law in the air transport sector, addressing legal and regulatory challenges.
- "Shipping in Europe and the Emergence of a Common Maritime Transport Policy" (2000) – Published by Ant. N. Sakkoulas Publishers, this book is a detailed analysis of shipping and maritime transport institutions under EU law and regulation in the context of the newly emerged EU maritime transport policy.

In addition to his monographs, Nikolas Farantouris has contributed over 50 articles to peer-reviewed journals and edited volumes, furthering academic and policy discussions in his areas of expertise.

He has written over 600 articles, analyses and contributions in leading newspaper and periodicals on contemporary issues.
