= Ioannis Golias =

Greek academic and civil engineer

- Ιωάννης Γκόλιας

Minister of Productive Reconstruction, Environment and Energy
- In office 28 August 2015 – 23 September 2015
- Prime Minister: Vassiliki Thanou-Christophilou
- Preceded by: Panos Skourletis
- Succeeded by: Panos Skourletis

Rector of the National Technical University of Athens
- Incumbent
- Assumed office 2014

Personal details
- Born: Greece
- Party: Independent
- Education: Imperial College London; University College London

Ioannis Golias (Greek: Ιωάννης Γκόλιας) is a Greek academic and civil engineer who was the former Minister of Productive Reconstruction, Environment and Energy in the Caretaker Cabinet of Vassiliki Thanou-Christophilou. He was also the Rector of the National Technical University of Athens.

== Education ==
Golias received a diploma in civil engineering from the National Technical University of Athens in 1977, before completing a Master's degree in transportation from Imperial College London in 1978. He then completed a PhD in transportation from University College London in 1981.

== Academic career ==
Golias is a member of the Technical Chamber of Greece, the World Conference on Transport Research Society, the American Society of Civil Engineers, the Greek Road Federation, the Association of Civil Engineers of Greece and the Hellenic Institute of Transportation Engineers.

From 1987 to 1991, Golias was a lecturer in the Department of Civil Engineering at the National Technical University of Athens. From 1991 to 1995, he was an assistant professor, and from 1995 to 2002 he was an associate professor. Since 2002, he has been a full professor in the department, and is also head of the Laboratory of Traffic Engineering. Golias served as the Head of the School of Civil Engineering from 2009 to 2013, and from 2013 to 2014 he was the Dean of the School of Civil Engineering.

Golias became the Rector of the National Technical University of Athens in late 2014, but complained that he could not actually reach his office as the institution was under occupation. Golias responded to graffiti sprayed on the front of the facade of the National Technical University by saying that it shows: "a lack of good manners and culture, given that this is a monument".

== Political career ==
At his handover ceremony, Golias said: "We are here to ensure that the country heads towards elections smoothly." His predecessor, Panos Skourletis, quipped that he hoped Golias's tenure would be even shorter than his own.
