= Panagiotis Lafazanis =

Greek politician

- Παναγιώτης Λαφαζάνης
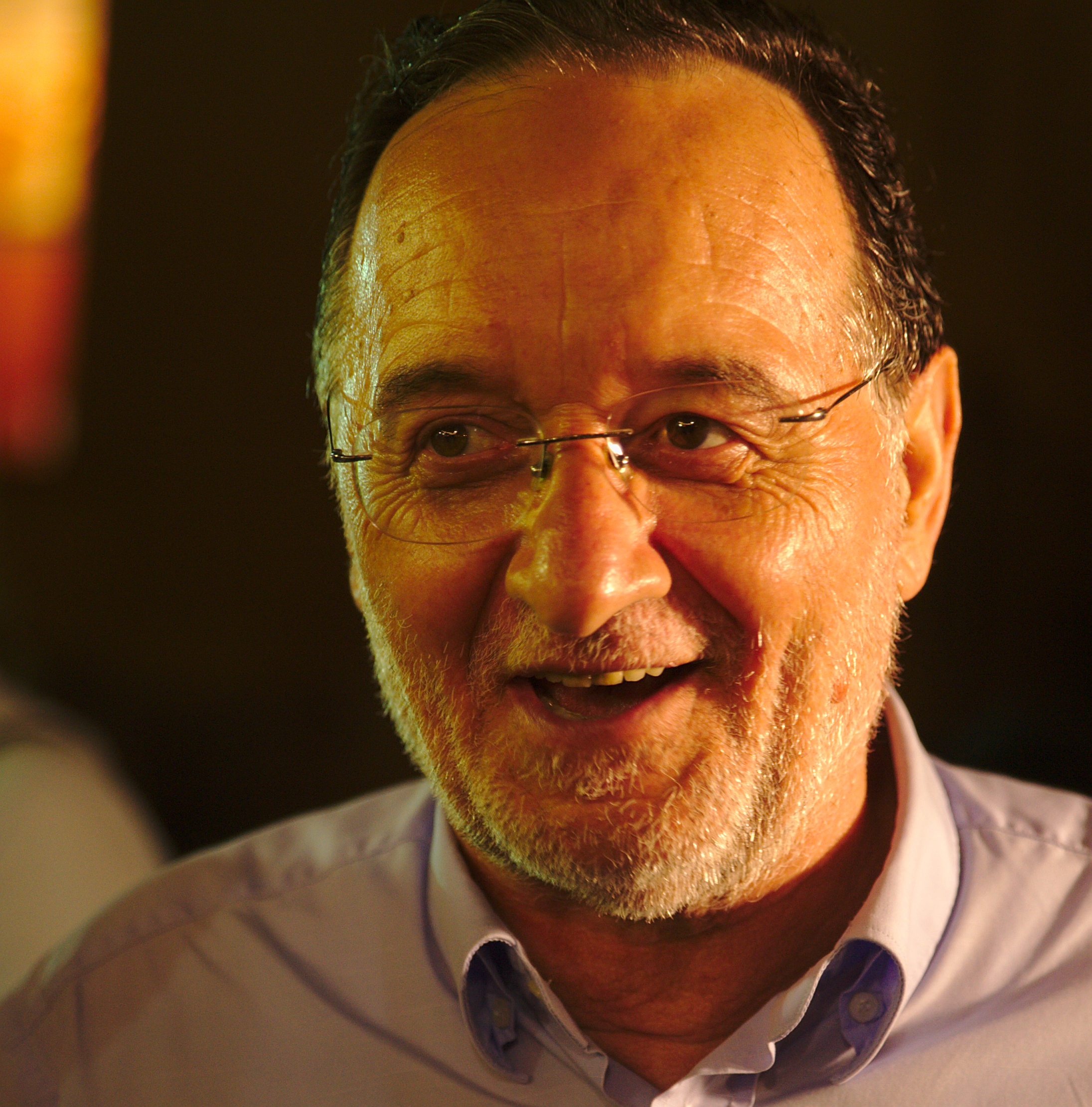
- Lafazanis in 2015

Leader of Popular Unity
- In office 21 August 2015 – 2 June 2019
- Preceded by: party established
- Succeeded by: Nikolaos Chountis

Minister of Productive Reconstruction, Environment and Energy
- In office 27 January 2015 – 17 July 2015
- Prime Minister: Alexis Tsipras
- Preceded by: Giannis Maniatis
- Succeeded by: Panos Skourletis

Member of the Hellenic Parliament
- In office 9 April 2000 – 20 September 2015
- Constituency: Piraeus B

Personal details
- Born: 19 November 1951 (age 74) Elefsina, Greece
- Party: Democratic Movement of National Liberation (2023–present)
- Other political affiliations: Popular Unity (2015–2020); Syriza (2004–2015)

Panagiotis Lafazanis (Greek: Παναγιώτης Λαφαζάνης, pronounced [panaˈʝotiz lafaˈzanis]; born 19 November 1951) is a Greek politician. He served as the leader of a new Greek left-wing political party, Popular Unity, from 21 August 2015 until his resignation on 2 June 2019.

Previously he was a member of Syriza, and from 27 January to 17 July 2015 he served in the cabinet of Alexis Tsipras as the Minister of Productive Reconstruction, Environment and Energy.

== Early life and education ==
Born in Elefsina, Lafazanis attended the faculty of mathematics at the University of Athens but did not graduate.

== Political career ==
Lafazanis was first elected as a Member of the Hellenic Parliament for Piraeus B at the 2000 Greek legislative election, representing Synaspismos. He was re-elected at the 2004 legislative election, the 2009 election (this time representing Syriza), the May 2012 election, the June 2012 election and the January 2015 election.

In the parliament of 2012–2014, he was Syriza's Parliamentary Spokesman and a member of the Special Permanent Committee on Institutions and Transparency. After the 2015 legislative election, he was appointed Minister of Productive Reconstruction, Environment and Energy in the cabinet of Alexis Tsipras on 27 January.

Lafazanis was the leader of Syriza's Left Platform and has been involved in a number of disputes with the more centrist party leader Alexis Tsipras. He has called "for SYRIZA to [be] swept by a new wave of radicalization in all areas, ideological, political, programmatic", opposing "the Troika, memoranda, neoliberalism and finally capitalism itself", and has spoken against continued Greek membership of the euro, describing the European Union as "totalitarian". On 11 July 2015, he rebelled against the SYRIZA/ANEL coalition by abstaining on a vote for austerity measures for a new bailout within the Eurozone.

In a cabinet reshuffle on 17 July 2015, Lafazanis was removed from his role as the Minister of Productive Reconstruction, Environment and Energy. He was replaced by Panos Skourletis, the Minister of Labour and Social Solidarity.

He has expressed his support for Russia in Russian invasion of Ukraine. He posted an election poster with the slogan “Russia is right, the United States and NATO have created hell in Ukraine.” The poster was decorated with the military symbol "Z". In January 2023, he founded a new Russophile party with the name Democratic Movement of National Liberation.

== Personal life ==
Lafazanis is married to Fryni Dialeti and has three daughters. He also speaks English fluently.

Political offices
Preceded by Giannis Maniatis	Minister of Productive Reconstruction, Environment and Energy; 27 January 2015 – 18 July 2015	Succeeded by Panos Skourletis
