= Nikos Pappas (politician) =

Greek economist and politician (born 1976)

- Νίκος Παππάς
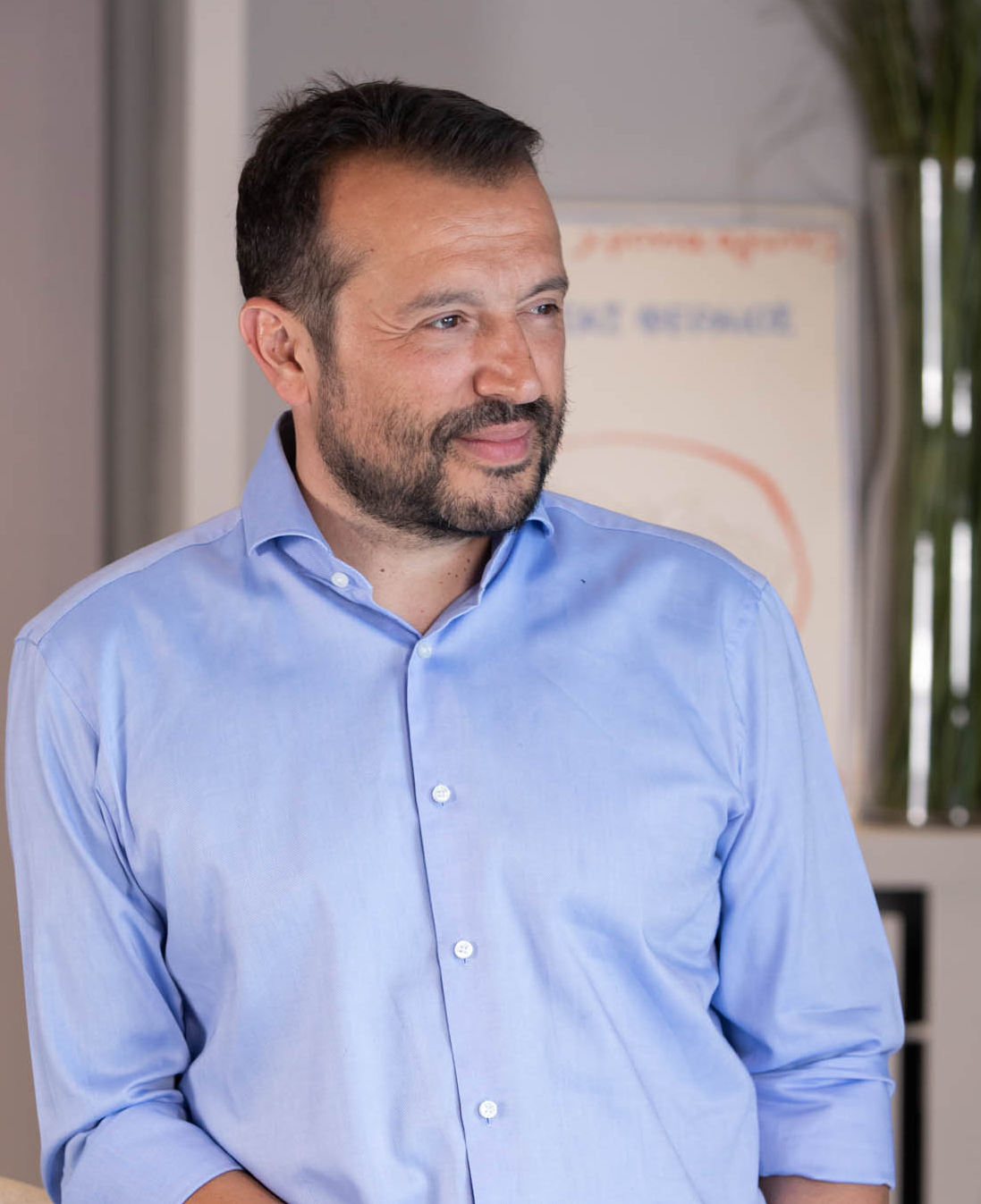

Parliamentary representative of Syriza
- Incumbent
- Assumed office 4 December 2024
- Preceded by: Sokratis Famellos

Leader of the Opposition De jure
- In office 27 August 2024 – 21 November 2024
- Prime Minister: Kyriakos Mitsotakis
- Preceded by: Sokratis Famellos
- Succeeded by: Nikos Androulakis

Minister of Digital Policy, Telecommunications and Media
- In office 4 November 2016 – 9 July 2019
- Prime Minister: Alexis Tsipras
- Preceded by: office established
- Succeeded by: Kyriakos Pierrakakis

Minister of State
- In office 23 September 2015 – 5 November 2016
- Prime Minister: Alexis Tsipras
- Preceded by: Eleftherios Papageorgopoulos
- Succeeded by: Christoforos Vernardakis
- In office 27 January 2015 – 28 August 2015
- Prime Minister: Alexis Tsipras
- Preceded by: Dimitrios Stamatis
- Succeeded by: Eleftherios Papageorgopoulos

Member of the Hellenic Parliament
- Incumbent
- Assumed office 25 January 2015
- Constituency: Athens B

Personal details
- Born: 16 July 1976 (age 50) Athens, Greece
- Party: Syriza
- Education: University of Strathclyde
- Profession: Politician; Economist
- Website: npappas.gr

Nikos Pappas (Greek: Νίκος Παππάς; born 16 July 1976) is a Greek economist and politician who serves as parliamentary representative of Syriza. He also served as Minister of Digital Policy, Telecommunications and Media in Alexis Tsipras' second cabinet. He represents the Athens B constituency in the Hellenic Parliament.

== Early life and education ==
Pappas studied at the University of Strathclyde and completed his PhD there in 2013, having written his thesis on the topic of the macroeconomic impact of projected population changes in Greece. In 2015, the University of Strathclyde Students' Association awarded Pappas lifetime membership for doing "inspiring work" to "rebalance the economic injustices facing working people".

Pappas lived in Scotland until he was invited to Greece in February 2008 by Alexis Tsipras. He formerly worked at the Fraser of Allander Institute, part of the University of Strathclyde, as a researcher.

== Political career ==
Pappas was a minister of the government of Alexis Tsipras. They first met at a meeting of Synaspismos Youth when they were 19. He later became Tsipras' chief of staff. He was appointed as a Minister of State in the First Cabinet of Alexis Tsipras. On 24 February 2023, Pappas was convicted by a Special Tribunal to two years in prison for the crime of breach of duty relating to his handling of television broadcast licenses during his tenure as Minister of Communications in the government of Alexis Tsipras from 2015 to 2019.

In 2023 he participated in the 2023 Syriza leadership election being eliminated in the first round coming second to last with 12,787 (8.7%) later endorsing Stefanos Kasselakis who ended up winning the election and becoming leader of the party.

In 2024 after the European parliamentary elections and in prospects of a possible Pasok leadership election in autumn of the same year, he started supporting the idea of a united centre-left to counter New Democracy in the elections of 2027 much alike the alliance of the New Popular Front in France.
