= Eleftherios Papageorgopoulos =

Greek politician

- Ελευθέριος Παπαγεωργόπουλος

Minister of State
- In office 28 August 2015 – 23 September 2015
- Prime Minister: Vassiliki Thanou-Christophilou

Member of the Hellenic Parliament for Euboea
- In office 18 June 1989 – 7 March 2004

Mayor of Chalcis
- In office 1 May 1985 – 31 December 1986

Personal details
- Born: 6 October 1947 (age 78) Chalcis, Greece
- Party: New Democracy
- Spouse: Amalia Passa
- Children: Three
- Education: University of Athens

Eleftherios Papageorgopoulos (Greek: Ελευθέριος Παπαγεωργόπουλος) is a Greek politician who served as a Minister of State in Vassiliki Thanou-Christophilou's caretaker cabinet from August to September 2015.

== Early life and education ==
Papageorgopoulos was born in Chalcis on 6 October 1947. He studied law at the University of Athens.

== Political career ==
Papageorgopoulos served as President of Chalcis Municipality on the City Council from 1 January 1983 to 4 March 1985. From 1 May 1985 to 31 December 1986, Papageorgopoulos served as Mayor of Chalcis.

Papageorgopoulos was first elected as a New Democracy Member of the Hellenic Parliament (MP) for Euboea in the June 1989 election. He was subsequently re-elected in November 1989, 1990, 1993, 1996 and 2000. As an MP, he was a member of the Standing Committee on Economic Affairs and a member of the Commission for the Revision of the Constitution. He served for some time as the parliamentary spokesperson for New Democracy.

On 28 August 2015, Papageorgopoulos was sworn in as a Minister of State in Vassiliki Thanou-Christophilou's caretaker cabinet, serving until 23 September 2015.

== Personal life ==
Papageorgopoulos is married to Amalia Passa and has one daughter and two sons.
