= Manousos Voloudakis =

Greek politician (1966–2023)

Manousos Voloudakis Μανούσος Βολουδάκης MP

Secretary General of Trade at the Ministry of Development
- In office 2005–2006
- Prime Minister: Kostas Karamanlis

Deputy Minister of Administrative Reform and e-Governance
- In office June 2012 – 25 June 2013
- Prime Minister: Antonis Samaras
- Succeeded by: Evi Christofilopoulou

Personal details
- Born: 16 December 1966 Athens, Greece
- Died: 8 February 2023 (aged 56) Athens, Greece
- Resting place: Saint Luke Cemetery, Chania
- Party: New Democracy (Greece)
- Spouse: Sevi Voloudaki
- Children: 3
- Education: National and Kapodistrian University of Athens; University of Sussex
- Profession: Politician
- Website: www.voloudakis.gr

Manousos-Konstantinos Voloudakis (Greek: Μανούσος-Κωνσταντίνος Βολουδάκης; 16 December 1966 – 8 February 2023) was a Greek politician who was a Member of the Hellenic Parliament. He was elected MP of the regional unit of Chania, Crete with New Democracy in the 2019 Greek legislative election.

== Early life and education ==
Voloudakis was born on 16 December 1966 in Athens to a family originally from Sfakia, Crete. He had an Economics degree which he received from the National and Kapodistrian University of Athens. After his graduation, he entered the University of Sussex in England where he obtained a postgraduate degree in Political Economy.

Before becoming a politician, he worked in the private sector, successively in the companies RUSVAR HOLDINGS BV, (1993-1996), in Metaxa Distillery SA. (1996-1997) and at ELVAL S.A. (1997-2004), where he served as Deputy General Manager. He also worked as a business consultant, while from October 2015 to June 2019, he worked again in the private sector, assuming the position of CEO of the company International Trade SA, of the Viohalco heavy industry corporation, based in Brussels. He was fluent in English, French, and Spanish.

== Political career ==
In September 2007 he was elected as an MP for the New Democracy party and represented the regional unit of Chania Crete. In the period of 2005-2006 he was Secretary General of Trade at the Ministry of Development. He was re-elected following double legislative elections of May and June 2012. He was Deputy Minister of Administrative Reform and e-Governance from June 2012 to June 2013. He was re-elected in the 2019 Greek legislative election.

== Personal life and death ==
Voloudakis was married to the lawyer Sevi Amanatidou and father of three children. He died of lung cancer on 8 February 2023, at the age of 56. Sevi was elected MP in his constituency in both the May 2023 and the June 2023 legislative elections.
