= The National Herald =

New York based newspaper of the Greek-American community

- Type: Weekly newspaper
- Founded: 1997; 29 years ago
- Language: English
- City: Long Island City, New York
- Country: United States
- Circulation: 45,000 (as of 2017)
- Sister newspapers: Ethnikos Kyrix
- Website: thenationalherald.com

Logo of Ethnikos Kyrix

The National Herald is an English-language weekly newspaper, based in New York City, focusing on the Greek-American community. It was founded in 1997 and added a website in 2004. Its headquarters are in the Long Island City neighborhood of the borough of Queens.

It is a sister publication of the Greek-language American newspaper Ethnikos Kyrix (Greek: Εθνικός Κήρυξ), founded in 1915 by Petros Tatanis. As of 2019, The National Herald's publisher is Vanessa Diamataris, daughter of longtime Ethnikos Kyrix publisher Antonis H. Diamataris; her brother, Eraklis Diamataris, is the current publisher of Ethnikos Kyrix.
