= Giorgos Stathakis =

Greek politician and economist

- Γιώργος Σταθάκης
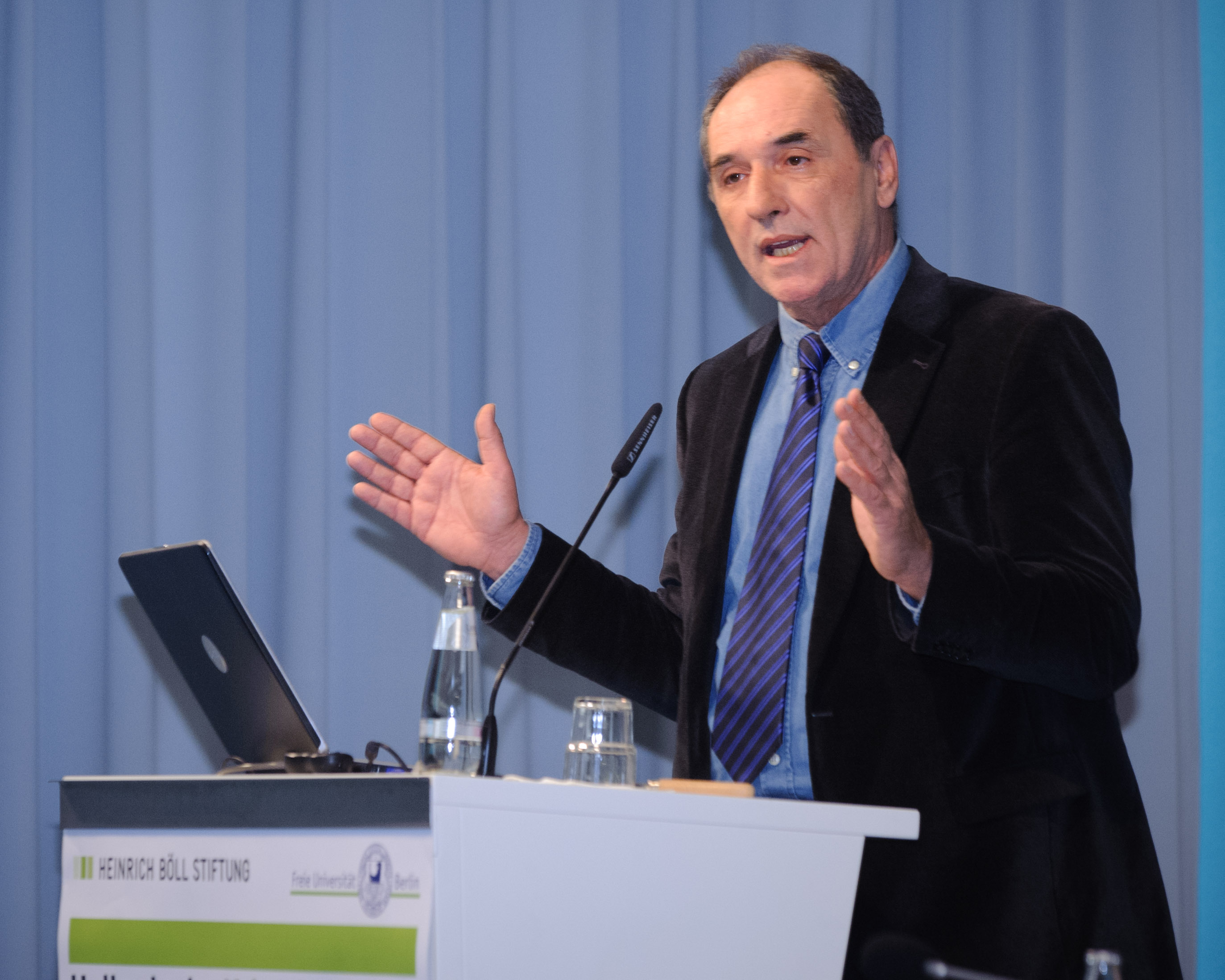

Minister of Environment and Energy
- In office 5 November 2016 – 9 July 2019
- Prime Minister: Alexis Tsipras
- Preceded by: Panos Skourletis
- Succeeded by: Kostis Hatzidakis

Minister of Economy, Infrastructure, Shipping and Tourism
- In office 23 September 2015 – 5 November 2016
- Prime Minister: Alexis Tsipras
- Preceded by: Nikos Christodoulakis
- Succeeded by: Dimitri B. Papadimitriou
- In office 27 January 2015 – 28 August 2015
- Prime Minister: Alexis Tsipras
- Preceded by: Konstantinos Skrekas
- Succeeded by: Nikos Christodoulakis

Member of the Hellenic Parliament for Chania
- Incumbent
- Assumed office 6 May 2012

Personal details
- Born: 8 November 1953 (age 72) Chania, Greece
- Party: Syriza
- Spouse: Themis Geckou
- Children: Two children
- Education: University of Athens; Newcastle University

Giorgos Stathakis (Greek: Γιώργος Σταθάκης; born 8 November 1953) is a Greek politician and economist. From 27 January to 28 August 2015, he served as the Minister of Economy, Infrastructure, Shipping and Tourism in the cabinet of Alexis Tsipras. He has also been a Member of the Hellenic Parliament for Chania since May 2012.

Stathakis is a professor of political economy at the University of Crete, but has been on leave since being elected as an MP. He was formerly a Vice-Rector of the university.

== Early life and education ==
Stathakis graduated from the University of Athens in 1976 with degree in economics. He continued his studies, graduating in 1978 with a Master's degree in economics, and in 1983 with a Doctorate in economics, both from Newcastle University. His doctoral thesis was titled: "Industrial Development and the Regional Problem: The Case of Greece".

== Academic career ==
Stathakis worked at the Mediterranean Studies Foundation from 1985 to 1986 and at the Computer Technology Institute in Patras from 1986 to 1987. From 1987 to 1988 he worked as a visiting researcher at the Center for Byzantine and Modern Greek Studies, Queens College, City University of New York, and as a visiting scholar from 1992 to 1993 at the Center for European Studies, Harvard University.

In 1988 he joined the staff at the University of Crete as a lecturer. He became an associate professor in 1992 and in 1997 became a full professor of political economy. His teaching focuses on Marxist analysis and economic methodology. Stathakis has also been one of three Vice-Rectors of the University of Crete, but stepped down following the May 2012 legislative election.

== Political career ==
Stathakis was first elected as a Member of the Hellenic Parliament for Chania in the May 2012 Greek legislative election. He was re-elected in the June 2012 legislative election and in the January 2015 legislative election.

Stathakis is reportedly seen as "more market-friendly" than most of his colleagues in Syriza. Alexis Tsipras has reportedly said that Stathakis is "so valuable that if he didn't exist he would have to be invented".

Before Syriza came to power following the 2015 legislative election, Stathakis served as the shadow development minister in the Shadow Cabinet of Alexis Tsipras. In an interview with the Financial Times before the 2015 legislative election, Stathakis set out Syriza's plan to crack down on Greek oligarchs if it won the election.

Following the 2015 legislative election, Stathakis was appointed as the Minister of Economy, Infrastructure, Shipping and Tourism in the cabinet of Alexis Tsipras.

Stathakis was named as a potential replacement for Yanis Varoufakis after he resigned as Minister for Finance on 6 July 2015, following Tsipras' decision to disregard the resounding 'No' vote in the Greek bailout referendum and cave in to the creditors' demand that Greek accepted a new bailout package without any debt relief. He was later appointed as the economy minister. During his tenure it was revealed that he failed to report thirty-eight properties and €1.8m in his assets declaration of 2011. A parliamentary committee is investigating the revelations.

== Personal life ==
Stathakis is married to Themis Gekou and has two children.
