= 2023 Syriza leadership election =

Election for president of Syriza

- 17 September 2023 (first round); 24 September 2023 (second round)
- Opinion polls
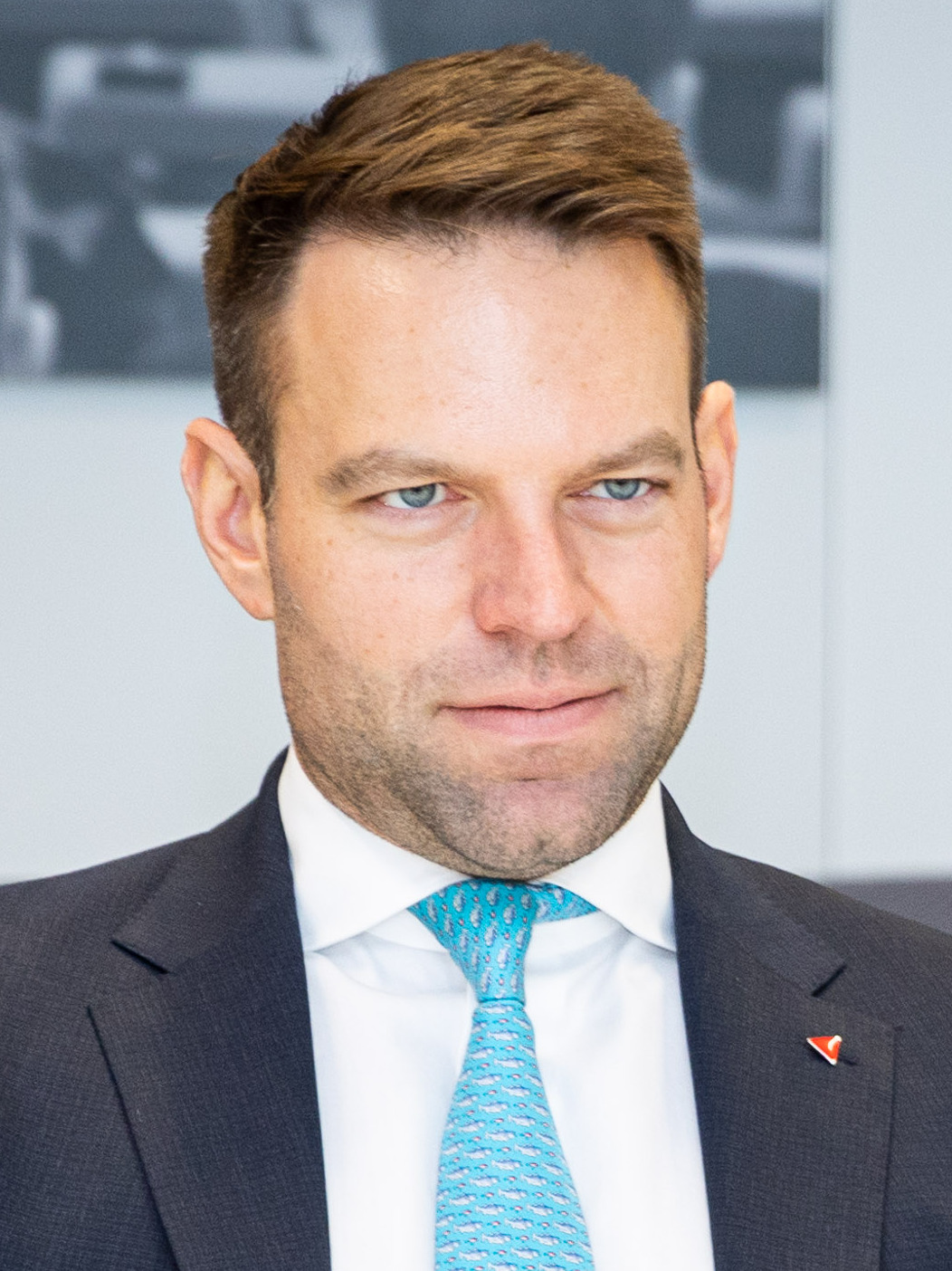

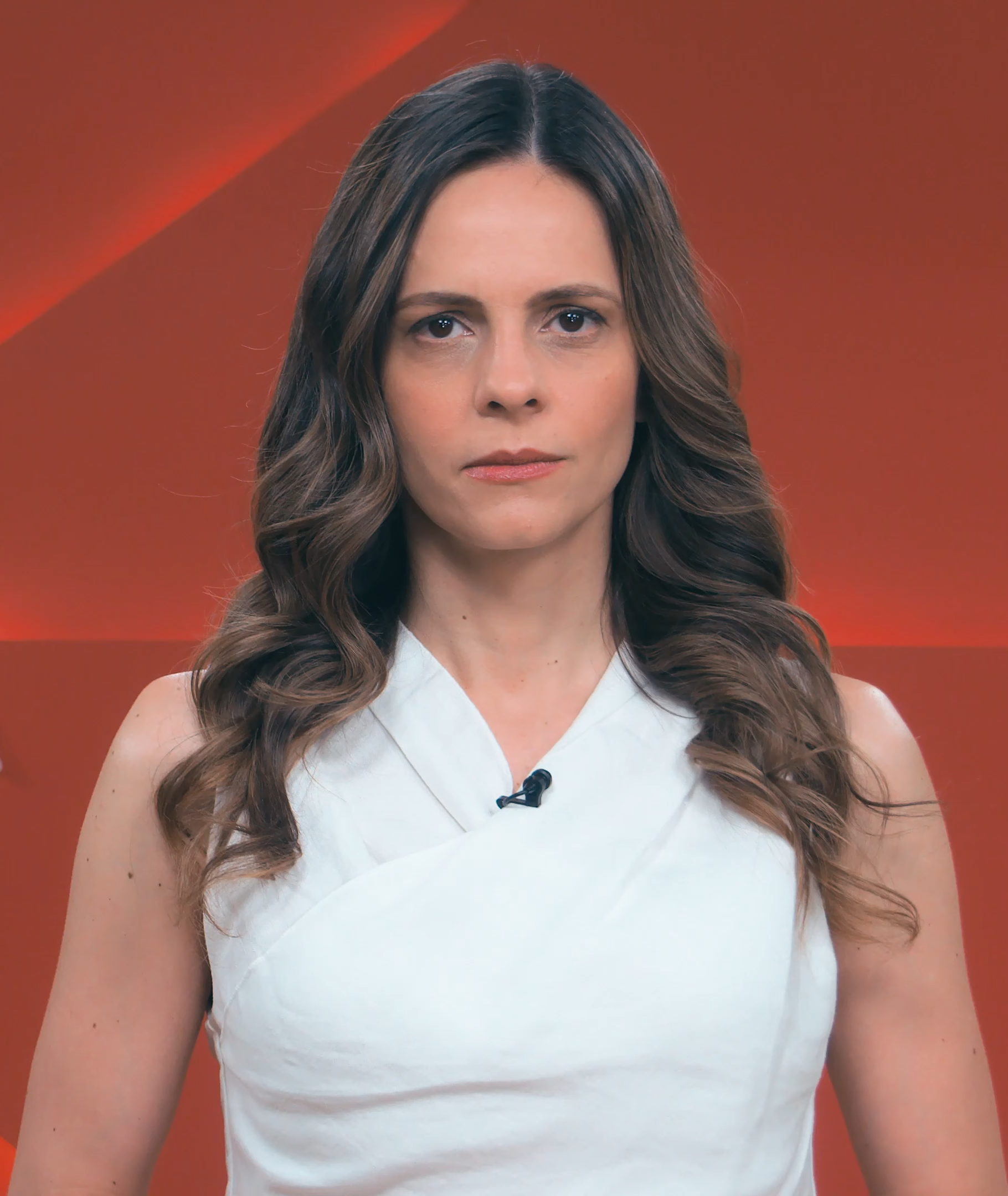

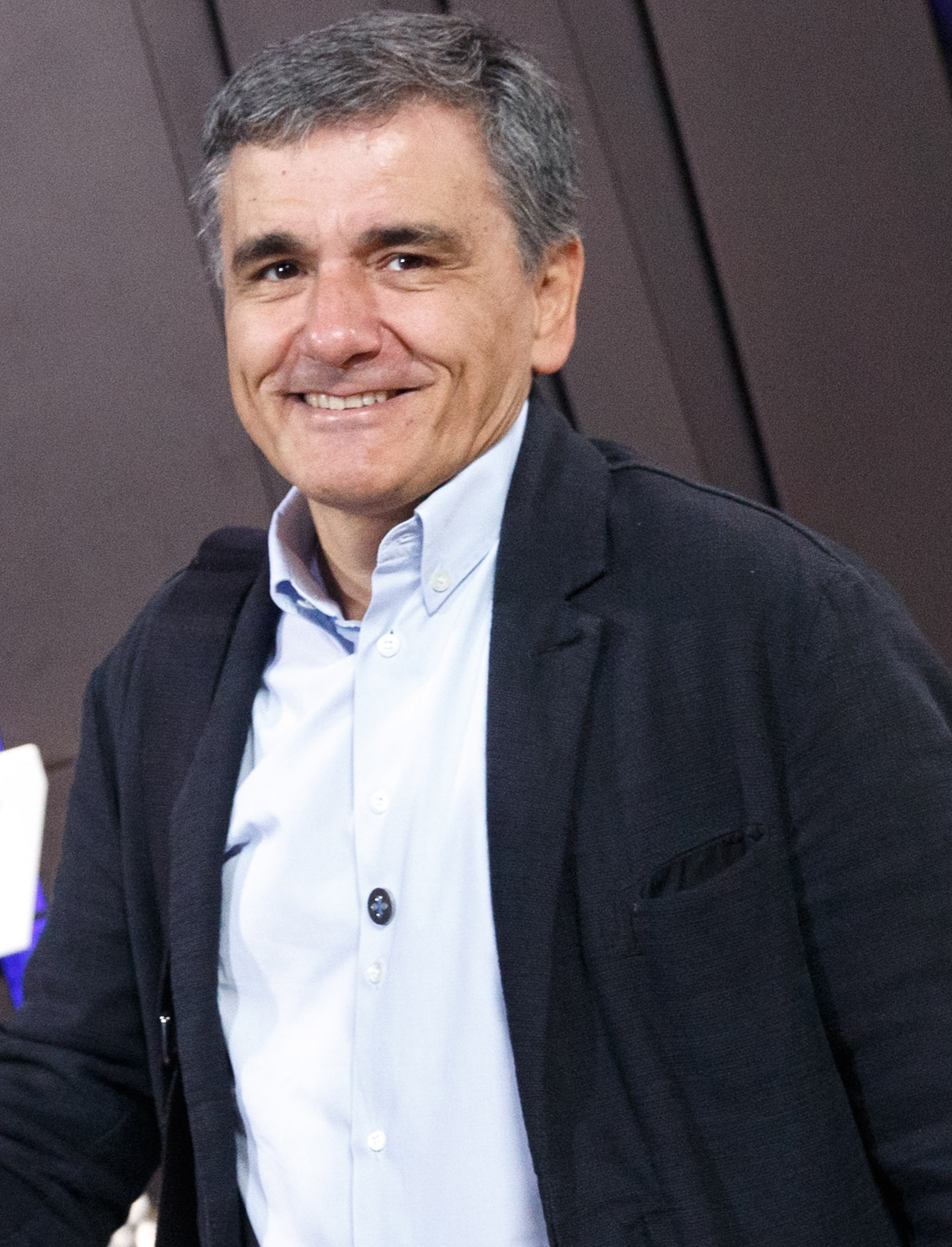

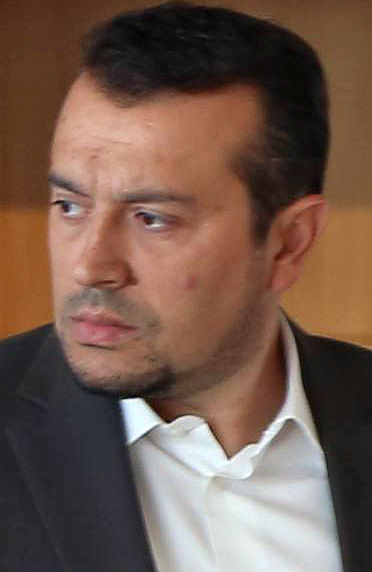
Candidate	Stefanos Kasselakis	Effie Achtsioglou	Euclid Tsakalotos
First round	66,156 (44.9%)	53,292 (36.2%)	13,156 (8.9%)
Second round	74,285 (56.0%)	58,425 (44.0%)	Eliminated
Candidate	Nikos Pappas	Stefanos Tzoumakas
First round	12,787 (8.7%)	1,917 (1.3%)
Second round	Eliminated	Eliminated
President before election
Alexis Tsipras
Elected President
Stefanos Kasselakis

A leadership election was held in September 2023 within Syriza after the resignation of leader Alexis Tsipras following the June 2023 legislative election. It was won by Stefanos Kasselakis after two rounds of voting.

== Background ==
=== Previous leadership election ===
In January 2022, Alexis Tsipras, then president of SYRIZA - PS, proposed to the party's political council the election of the leader and the central committee directly by its members, which was accepted and voted through despite the disagreement of the internal party opposition group "Umbrella" from the party congress in April with 70% of the votes.

On 15 May elections were held for the presidency of the party, which were open to members and friends of the party, while only those who had been members before 21 March were admitted to vote for the central committee.

Alexis Tsipras was re-elected with 100% of the valid votes and 140,000 new members. A total of 172,000 citizens participated.

=== 2023 ===
After the June 2023 Greek legislative election, Syriza received a record low percentage of 17.83% since the May 2012 Greek legislative election. Tsipras announced his resignation 4 days after the elections on 29 June 2023. He stated that the party needs, "profound renewal and refoundation". Sokratis Famellos was unanimously elected to take his place as president of the parliamentary group, becoming the leader of the official opposition.

All party members of Syriza who were aged 15-years-old and above before 17 September 2023 could vote in the leadership election. The vote was held under the two-round system.

== Candidates ==
Effie Achtsioglou announced her intention to run for presidency on 12 July from the Athens Conservatoire. A day later, Euclid Tsakalotos announced his candidacy. Nikos Pappas announced his candidacy during the central committee’s meeting, on 15 July. In August 2023, Stefanos Kasselakis announced that he would be running in the election.

== Opinion polls ==
Leadership Election voting intention by Metron Analysis for MEGA TV:

- Stefanos Kasselakis: 39%
- Effie Achtsioglou: 31%
- Euclid Tsakalotos: 13%
- Nikos Pappas: 3%
- Stefanos Tzoumakas: 3%

== Results ==
Kasselakis was the top vote-getter in the first round of the leadership contest on 17 September 2023 with Effie Achtsioglou in second place.

Candidate	First round		Second round	
Candidate	Votes	%	Votes	%
Stefanos Kasselakis	66,156	44.91	74,285	55.98
Effie Achtsioglou	53,292	36.18	58,425	44.02
Euclid Tsakalotos	13,156	8.93		
Nikos Pappas	12,787	8.68		
Stefanos Tzoumakas	1,917	1.30		
Total	147,308	100.00	132,710	100.00
Valid votes	147,308	98.98	132,710	98.73
Invalid/blank votes	1,513	1.02	1,710	1.27
Total votes	148,821	100.00	134,420	100.00

As no candidate received over 50% of the vote in the first round there was a run-off election between the top two candidates, those being Stefanos Kasselakis and Effie Achtsioglou, on 24 September 2023.

In the second round Kasselakis received 55.98% of the vote and Achtsioglou received 44.02%, giving Kasselakis the victory. Kasselakis spoke of wanting Syriza to emulate the U.S. Democratic Party and move to the centre-left.
