= Panos Skourletis =

Greek politician

Panos Skourletis MP
- Πάνος Σκουρλέτης
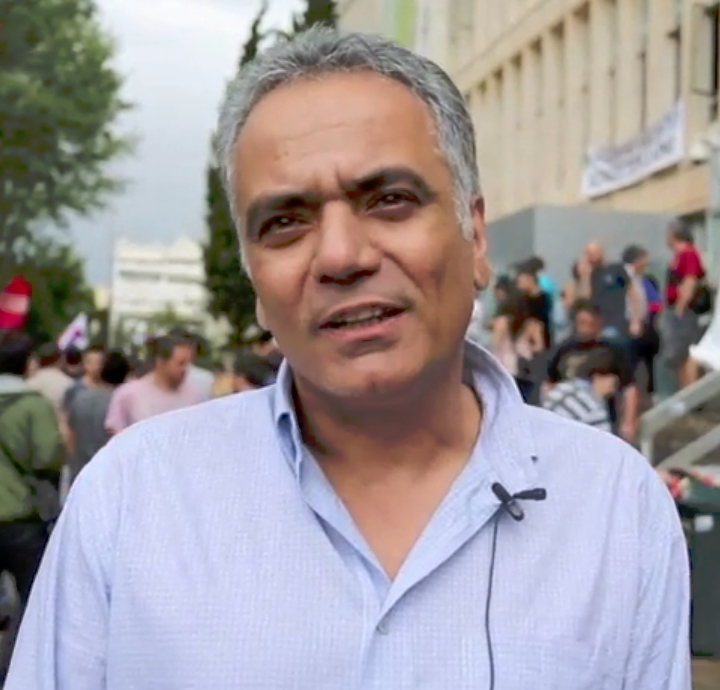

Minister of Interior
- In office 6 November 2016 – 28 August 2018
- Prime Minister: Alexis Tsipras
- Preceded by: Panagiotis Kouroumblis
- Succeeded by: Alexandros Charitsis

Minister of Productive Reconstruction, Environment and Energy
- In office 23 September 2015 – 5 November 2016
- Prime Minister: Alexis Tsipras
- Preceded by: Ioannis Golias
- Succeeded by: Giorgos Stathakis
- In office 18 July 2015 – 28 August 2015
- Prime Minister: Alexis Tsipras
- Preceded by: Panagiotis Lafazanis
- Succeeded by: Ioannis Golias

Minister of Labour and Social Solidarity
- In office 27 January 2015 – 18 July 2015
- Prime Minister: Alexis Tsipras
- Preceded by: Giannis Vroutsis
- Succeeded by: Georgios Katrougalos

Personal details
- Born: 1 January 1962 (age 64) Athens, Greece
- Party: Coalition of the Radical Left
- Education: University of Piraeus

Panagiotis ("Panos") Skourletis (Greek: Παναγιώτης ("Πάνος") Σκουρλέτης; born 1 January 1962 in Athens) is a Greek politician of the Coalition of the Radical Left (SYRIZA). He served as the Minister of Productive Reconstruction, Environment and Energy from 18 July to 28 August 2015. From 27 January 2015 to 18 July 2015 he was the Minister of Labour and Social Solidarity.

== Biography ==
Skourletis was born in Exarcheia, Athens, in 1962. He studied economics at the University of Piraeus, where he became active in the Rigas Feraios youth wing of the eurocommunist KKE Interior. In 1990, he joined Synaspismos, and subsequently followed that party into Syriza. He became party spokesman of Syriza in October 2009.

Political offices
Preceded by Giannis Vroutsis	Minister of Labour and Social Solidarity; 27 January 2015 – 18 July 2015	Succeeded by Georgios Katrougalos
Preceded by Panagiotis Lafazanis	Minister of Productive Reconstruction, Environment and Energy; 18 July 2015 – 5 November 2016	Succeeded by Giorgos Stathakis
Preceded by Panagiotis Kouroumblis	Minister of Interior; 6 November 2016 – 28 August 2018	Succeeded by Alexandros Charitsis
