= Pavlos Polakis =

Greek politician (born 1965)

- Παύλος Πολάκης
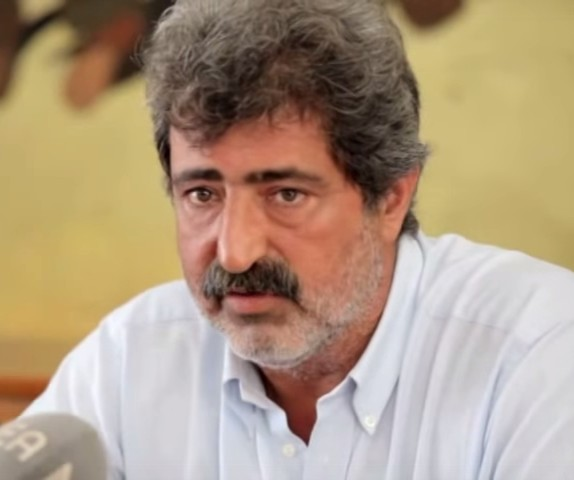
- Polakis in 2014

Alternate Minister of Health
- In office 23 September 2015 – 9 July 2019
- Prime Minister: Alexis Tsipras
- Preceded by: Andreas Janthos
- Succeeded by: Vasilis Kontozamanis

Deputy Minister of the Interior and Administrative Reconstruction
- In office 28 January 2015 – 28 August 2015
- Prime Minister: Alexis Tsipras
- Preceded by: Manousos Boloudakis
- Succeeded by: Antonis Makridimitris

Mayor of Sfakia
- In office 1 January 2011 – 1 February 2015
- Preceded by: Iosif Lykos
- Succeeded by: Ioannis Zervos

Member of the Hellenic Parliament
- Incumbent
- Assumed office 25 January 2015
- Constituency: Chania

Personal details
- Born: 11 May 1965 (age 61) Sfakia, Greece
- Other political affiliations: Syriza (2012-); NAR (1989); KKE (until 1989)
- Spouse: Dora Tsoukou
- Children: 2
- Education: National and Kapodistrian University of Athens
- Occupation: Politician; Surgeon

Pavlos Polakis (Greek: Παύλος Πολάκης; born 11 May 1965) is a Greek politician and physician (specializing in surgery). He currently serves in the Hellenic Parliament as an MP for Chania, with the SYRIZA party. He commenced his political career at the local government level, serving as Mayor of Sfakia from 2011 to 2015. He joined the central political arena as a member of parliament for the prefecture of Chania in 2015. He served as Deputy Minister of the Interior and Administrative Reconstruction. (July–August 2015) in the First Cabinet of Alexis Tsipras and Alternate Minister of Health (September 2015–July 2019) in the Second Cabinet. He has been an elected MP for Chania with SYRIZA since 2015.

Polakis is a highly controversial figure who has frequently been in the Greek media due to his use of defamatory references to his political opponents. However, he has a significant and dynamic circle of supporters, namely SYRIZA voters, who applaud the way he intervenes in political life. The neologism Polakism has been created from his way of intervening in the political life of the country. According to Georgios Babiniotis' "Dictionary of Modern Greek Language", Polakism is verbal bashing.

He was candidate for Leader of Syriza at the 2024 Syriza leadership election losing to Sokratis Famellos.

== Political career ==
He studied at the Medical School of the National and Kapodistrian University of Athens, where he obtained the qualification of general surgeon-intensivist. Initially, he joined the KNE, from which he left in 1989 after the participation of the KKE in the government of Tzannis Tzannetakis and later joined the NAP. During his student years, he was a member of the Grigoris Lambrakis Medical Students' Association and a member of the Central Council of the National Student Union of Greece. After completing his studies, as a resident and as a specialist, he was elected member of the Board of Directors of the Athens and Piraeus Hospital Doctors' Association and of the General Council of the Federation of Hospital Doctors' Associations of Greece. He developed trade union activity at the General State Hospital of Nice, and participated in a humanitarian aid transport operation in Yugoslavia in 1999.

In the 2010 local elections, he was elected mayor of Sfakia in the first round, winning 60.97% of the votes, prevailing over his runner-up Yannis Hiotakis who received 39.03% of the votes. In the 2014 local elections, he was re-elected as the only candidate with 94% of the vote. His mayoral term was marked by several public works, as well as his opposition to the destruction of chemical weapons used during the Syrian Civil War off the Mediterranean Sea.

He was elected deputy for Chania with SYRIZA in the elections of January 2015 (when he served as Deputy Minister of Interior and Administrative Reconstruction), September 2015 (when he served as Deputy Minister of Health) and July 2019, when SYRIZA was the opposition party. In the July 2019 elections, he was elected first in cross votes for SYRIZA.

=== Governmental positions (2015–2019) ===
On 17 July 2015, he accepted Alexis Tsipras' proposal to take over as Deputy Minister of Interior and Administrative Reconstruction, following a reshuffle announced by the government. With the election victory of SYRIZA in September 2015, he was appointed as Deputy Minister of Health, with Andreas Xanthos as Chief Minister. In 2018, he announced the recruitment of 19,500 employees in the NHS.

== Family and personal life ==
Pavlos Polakis is married to Dora Tsouka who he met during his student days at the University of Athens Medical School. Together they have two daughters Stavroula and Persa.

== Controversies ==
He has come under fire from some of the press for his sharp rhetoric.

He has also been criticized for violations of the anti-smoking law in parliament. When he was deputy health minister he was criticized by EU health commissioner Vitenis Andriukaitis for smoking at a ministry press conference.

He has been involved in controversies with journalists, such as in December 2015 at a press conference where he made references to issues of entanglement. In April 2016, referring to the same journalist, he said that "I had to put him three meters underground", which caused a backlash.

=== Stance on vaccinations ===
In 2021 he announced publicly that he will not get vaccinated against COVID-19. Polakis came under heavy scrutiny in June 2021, as a result of controversial social media posts shared from his accounts, where he openly criticised the safety of COVID-19 vaccines. The government of New Democracy called Alexis Tsipras to take a stance on the issue, whilst Facebook blocked Polakis' account for sharing conspiracy theories. Ultimately, Alexis Tsipras also criticised Polakis, whilst other prominent Greek politicians and journalists called his wording 'dangerous', 'irresponsible' and vaccine hesitant. He received a COVID-19 vaccine in early September, 2021.
