= Sokratis Famellos =

Greek Leader of the Opposition since 2024

- Σωκράτης Φάμελλος
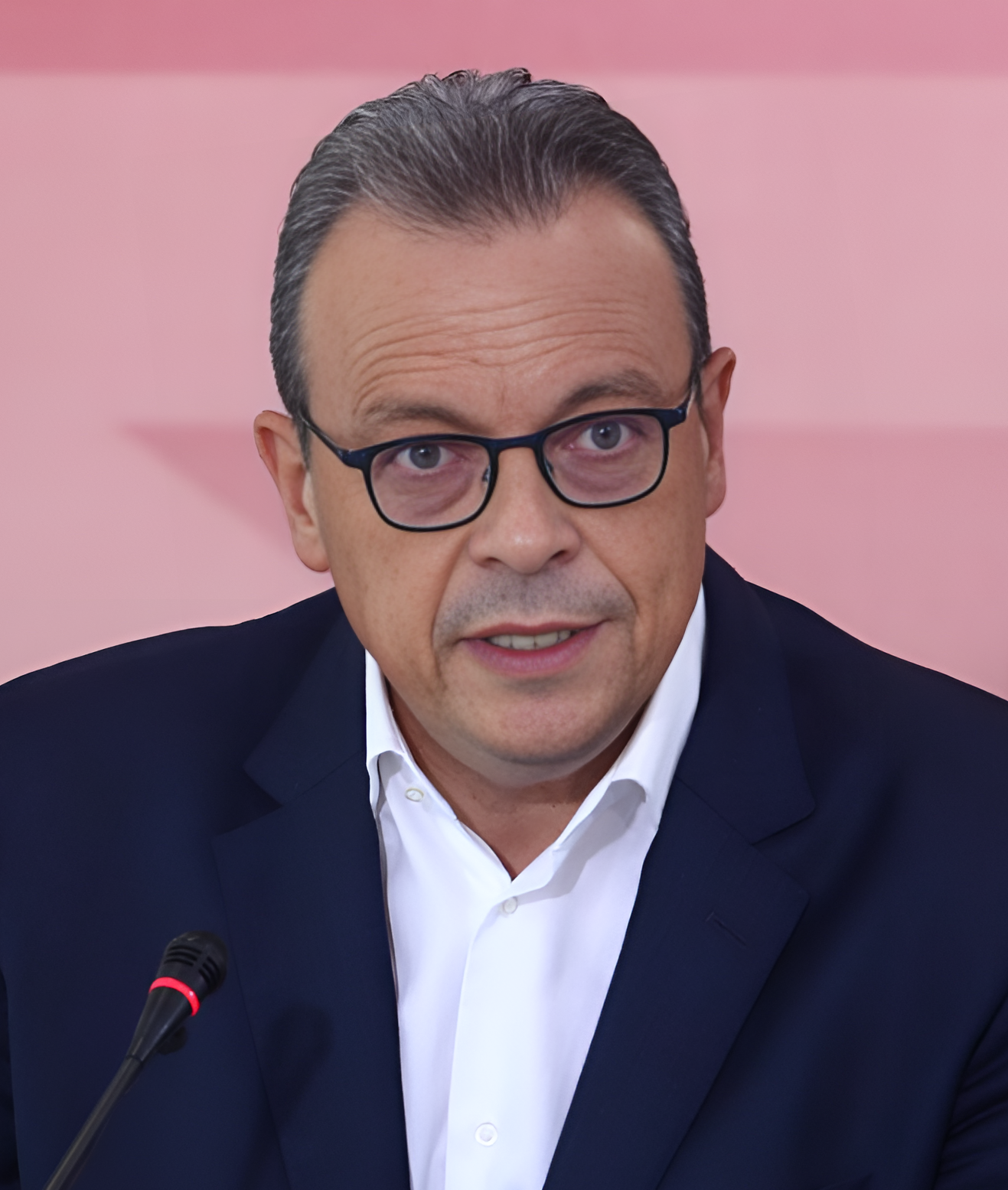
- Famellos in 2023

President of Syriza
- In office 24 November 2024 – 9 July 2026
- Preceded by: Stefanos Kasselakis

Leader of the Opposition
- In office 3 July 2023 – 27 August 2024
- Prime Minister: Kyriakos Mitsotakis
- Preceded by: Alexis Tsipras
- Succeeded by: Nikos Pappas

Leader of Syriza in the Hellenic Parliament
- In office 3 July 2023 – 27 August 2024
- President: Alexis Tsipras; Stefanos Kasselakis
- Preceded by: Alexis Tsipras
- Succeeded by: Nikos Pappas

Alternate Minister for Environment and Energy
- In office 5 November 2016 – 9 July 2019
- Prime Minister: Alexis Tsipras
- Minister: Giorgos Stathakis
- Preceded by: Giannis Tsironis
- Succeeded by: Giorgos Amyras

Member of the Hellenic Parliament
- Incumbent
- Assumed office 25 January 2015
- Constituency: Thessaloniki B

Personal details
- Born: Sokratis Famellos; 27 March 1966 (age 60) Athens, Greece
- Party: Synaspismos (1993-2013); Syriza (2013-present)
- Spouse: Popi Karagiannidou (d. 2018) Τatiana Papadopoulou (m. 2024)
- Children: 1
- Education: Aristotle University of Thessaloniki; Hellenic Open University
- Occupation: Politician; Chemical Engineer

Sokratis Famellos (Greek: Σωκράτης Φάμελλος; born 27 March 1966) is a Greek politician and former chemical engineer who served as president of Syriza from 2024 to 2026. He previously served as de jure Leader of the Official Opposition in the Hellenic Parliament from 2023 to 2024.

== Early life, education and career ==
Sokratis Famellos was born on 27 March 1966 in Athens, but was raised in Thessaloniki. He earned a diploma from the Aristotle University of Thessaloniki, and a Master of Science in Environmental Planning and Management from the Hellenic Open University; later working as a chemical engineer.

== Political career ==
Famellos was elected to the Hellenic Parliament representing for Thessaloniki B in 2015. He was reelected for the constituency in 2019 and served as the Alternative Minister for the Environment and Energy from November 2016 to July 2019.

Following the defeat of Syriza in the June 2023 Greek legislative election and the resignation of Alexis Tsipras as party chairman, on 3 July 2023 Famellos was elected as chairman of the Syriza parliamentary group.

Prior to the 2023 Syriza leadership election, there was speculation that Famellos would be a candidate, which he denied. Under the new leader, Stefanos Kasselakis, Famellos retained his position as leader of the parliamentary group. He became the Leader of the Opposition in the Hellenic Parliament, as Kasselakis was not an MP. On 27 August 2024, Famellos was dismissed from the position after refusing to resign.

Famellos stood in the 2024 Syriza leadership election and was elected president on 24 November after leading the first round with 49.41% of the votes. He was congratulated by Prime Minister Kyriakos Mitsotakis on his election as president.

He resigned his position on 9 July 2026.

== Personal life ==
Famellos was married to Popi Karagiannidou until her death in 2018. They had one son together.

Party political offices
| Preceded by Stefanos Kasselakis | Leader of Syriza; 2024–2026 |
