= Stefanos Kasselakis =

Greek politician (born 1988)

- Στέφανος Κασσελάκης
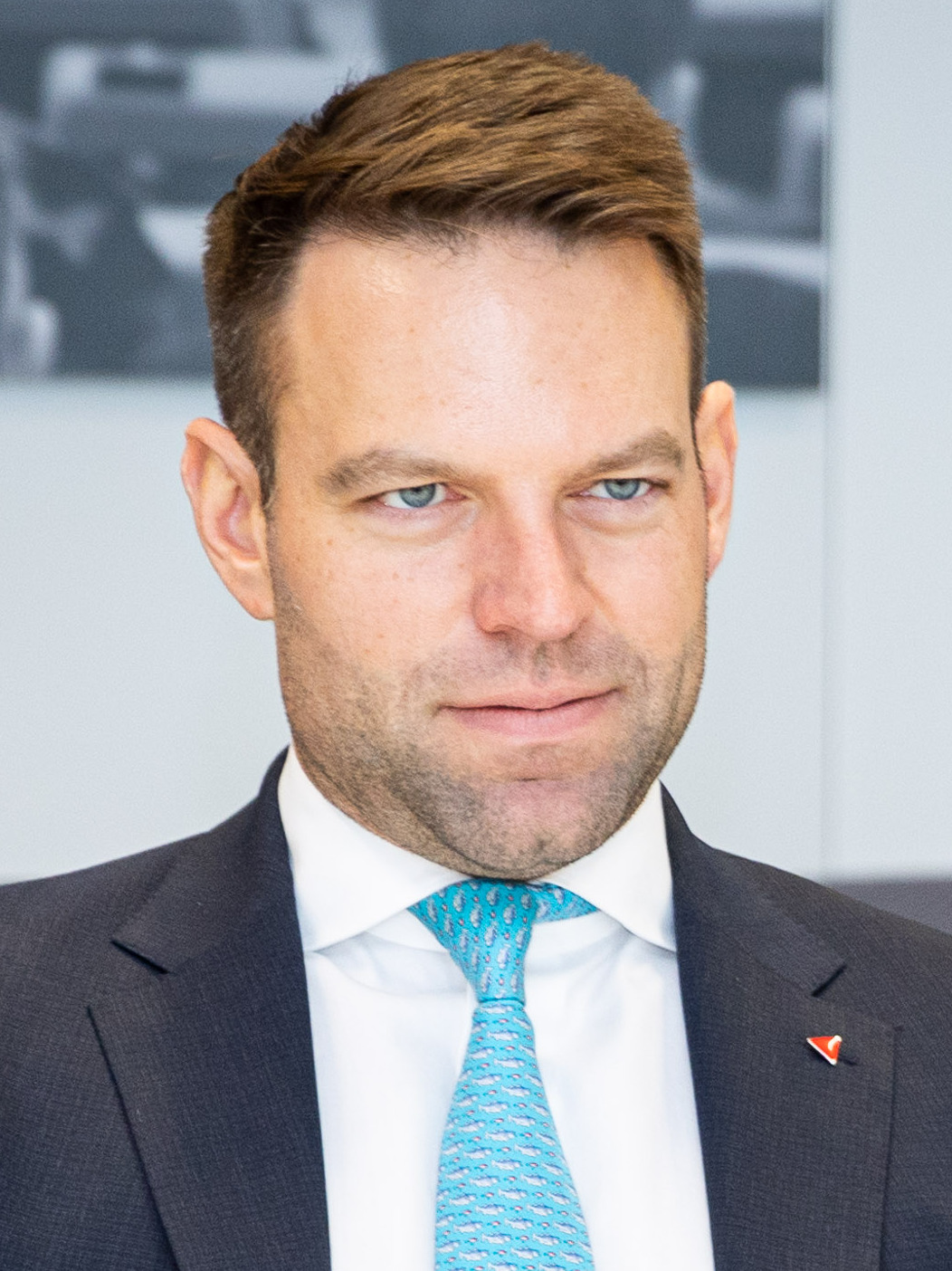
- Kasselakis in 2023

President of Movement for Democracy
- Incumbent
- Assumed office 23 November 2024
- Preceded by: Position established

President of Syriza
- In office 24 September 2023 – 8 September 2024
- Preceded by: Alexis Tsipras
- Succeeded by: Sokratis Famellos

Personal details
- Born: 29 March 1988 (age 38) Marousi, Greece
- Party: Movement for Democracy (2024–present)
- Other political affiliations: Syriza (2023–2024); Republican Party (U.S.) (2013–2019)
- Spouse: Tyler McBeth (m. 2023)
- Education: University of Pennsylvania (BS, BA)
- Occupation: Businessman; Politician

Stefanos Kasselakis (Greek: Στέφανος Κασσελάκης; born 29 March 1988) is a Greek businessman, entrepreneur and politician who previously served as the leader of Syriza. He is now the leader of the political party Democrats - Progressive Center, which he founded in November 2024.

Kasselakis spent a considerable portion of his life residing in the United States, where he worked in the banking and shipping sectors and contributed as a writer for The National Herald. He was registered as a Republican, supported Kyriakos Mitsotakis and endorsed his candidacy for party leader in 2015. He was an MP candidate with Syriza in the May and June 2023 Greek parliamentary elections.

In the 2023 Syriza leadership election, he secured a surprising victory over Effie Achtsioglou. However, a few months after his win, Syriza underwent a division, resulting in the departure of 11 Members of Parliament (MPs) and three Members of the European Parliament (MEPs), who exited the party in protest of Kasselakis' ideology and practices. The ideological shift and lack of clarity within the party led to substantial criticism of its leadership, particularly after the 2024 European Parliament elections, where Syriza’s share of the vote further dropped to 14.9%.

As a result of the growing discontent, 87 members of the party's Central Committee filed a motion of no confidence against him. On 8 September 2024, the party's Political Secretariat declared that he was being removed from office.

After these events Kasselakis was briefly a candidate for the 2024 Syriza leadership elections before being blocked from running by the party's 2024 conference, resulting in Sokratis Fammellos becoming his successor. Following his departure, 6 MPs left Syriza, of which 5 joined his new party.

== Early life and education ==
Stefanos Kasselakis, second son of Theodoros Kasselakis (Skines, Crete, 1949) and Evangelia (Lia) Apostolou (Athens, 1952) was born in Athens on 9 March 1988. He has an older brother, Stelios Kasselakis. Born into a wealthy family, he grew up in a mansion in Ekali, considered one of the most luxurious houses in this bourgeois district, and studied at Athens College, also an educational institution for wealthy families. A former classmate recalled that he was "a man of quality, always devoted to reading. He had experienced bullying himself. He was a man who was dedicated to his studies and some people didn't like that. He was made fun of because of his big bag, but Stefanos never bullied anyone.”

In 2002, the house in Ekali, which had been bought two months after Stefanos' birth in 1988, was sold for 3,228,173 euros. (Note: From the moment the Ekali villa left the ownership of the Kasselakis family, a legal adventure began that continues to this day. An audit by the "Financial Crime Unit" (SDOE, ΣΔΟΕ) revealed a debt of more than 4 million euros for the period 1995-2001, which, including surcharges, has now risen to more than 11 million euros.)

Stefanos Kasselakis' father, Theodoros Kasselakis, President and CEO of CASCO SA, was the representative of Casco Kansai Paint in Greece. In 2003, a lawyer and partner of Theodoros Kasselakis filed a fraud lawsuit accusing him of embezzling €764,000. According to the court ruling, his father lost his company. According to the indictment, Mr Theodoros Kasselakis allegedly presented his partner with non-existent financial obligations of the company, which the latter then paid, believing them to be real, with the promise from Kasselakis that sales of materials would follow which would exceed the money paid. According to the pleadings, the complainant had lost more than €750,000 in this way. By court order, the management of the company was removed from Kasselakis' father. The case was ultimately not heard, as the two sides agreed to an out-of-court settlement in 2018. The plaintiff withdrew his complaint, and the defendants were found innocent.

As a result of the legal dispute the family decided to leave Greece for the USA where the eldest son, Stelios, was already studying at MIT. Kasselakis himself presented this decision as a result of the persecution his family had suffered at the hands of the illegal judicial network. However, he refused to give any further explanation, and the journalists investigation was unable to verify the claim.

His very high grades at school and the silver medal he won in the Hellenic Mathematical Society's "Archimedes" competition, saw his application for a full scholarship to Phillips Academy High School in Andover, Massachusetts accepted. (Note: Kasselakis, among others, represented Greece in the Balkan Mathematical Olympiad. According to the records of the Balkan Junior Olympiad, ranked 37th out of 48 competitors.) He left Greece in September 2003. He was followed by his mother, who after working as a private dentist in 2006 joined the academic staff of Penn Dental Medicine as a Clinical Assistant Professor of Restorative Dentistry.

During his time at Andover, he took a particular interest in community service, serving as President of the "Pine Knoll Cluster" and President of the school's "International Club", as well as coordinating various extracurricular activities. In 2005—thanks to a scholarship granted by Andreas Drakopoulos, President of the Stavros Niarchos Foundation—he joined the Huntsman Program of the University of Pennsylvania and received two degrees: a B.S. in Finance from the Wharton School of Business and a B.A. in International Relations from the College of Arts & Sciences.

Kasselakis continues to have a close friendship with Andreas Drakopoulos. The president of the Niarchos Foundation is credited with introducing him to Alexis Tsipras and guiding his involvement in the Greek political scene.

In 2008, Kasselakis played an active role in the Joe Biden 2008 presidential campaign, with the main task of preparing for the ballots in every county in Iowa. He described this experience in a series of articles in the Greek expatriate newspaper, The National Herald. He recently wrote on his Instagram account: "It was a personal honor for me to work with him as a volunteer during the 2008 election campaign. I am grateful for my friendship with his son Beau (who sadly passed away young in 2015)."

== Career ==
After graduating from college in 2009, he faced two career choices: working in the White House in the office of newly elected Vice President Joe Biden or working at Goldman Sachs. He chose finance, which he felt was closer to his own positive, practical interests, and accepted the offer. He worked first in London and then in New York, first as a junior analyst and then as an associate in risk management in the commodities market. In 2014, he left Goldman Sachs (Note: According to a journalistic investigation by the newspaper PROTO THEMA, Kasselakis was fired by Goldman Sachs in October 2014 as redundant. Kasselakis denied the allegations. However, the article has been widely reproduced.) to attend MIT for a master's degree in business administration.

At the same time, he wanted to contribute to the difficult times that Greeks were going through during the years of the economic crisis, so he created the online platform "CVFromGreece". Interested people could get help from experts in writing their CVs to improve their chances of getting into university or the job market.

In 2014, he took over the management of "C. PENN Coating USA Inc.", which his father founded in 2007. Kasselakis rebranded the family business, changing its name to "Philadelphia Coatings" in honour of the city where he had lived during college, and, according to him, increased its turnover.

In 2016, noticing the low-price levels for dry bulk ships, he set up "Swift Bulk". Seeking investors for his business plan, he came to an agreement with "Tiptree Inc.", which decided to invest $35 million in Kaselakis' company. (Note: Νewspaper Proto Thema commented that the relationship between "Tiptree Marine" itself and Markos Nomikos' company is taken for granted by major shipping newspapers such as Trade Winds. So - and if the rumours of collusion are true - it explains who introduced young Stefanos Kasselakis to the decision-makers at the Wall Street-listed insurance and investment company Tiptree Incorporated, and how they were persuaded to invest $35 million in Kasselakis' 'Swiftbulk Project' - to enter the shipping market, in which they had no previous involvement, through a young 28-year-old with five years' experience in commodities rather than shipping.)

In 2018, Tiptree Marine LLC, absorbed not only Swiftbulk but also Philadelphia Coatings. In June 2022, the company sold 5 bulkers, taking advantage of rising advantage of rising prices and exit the dry bulk market, generating a total of $67.7 million. However, in March 2023, he was fired from Tiptree Marine - unfairly, in his view. In a lawsuit he filed against the company a month later, he claimed that the company had refused to pay him his contractually guaranteed salary and agreed bonuses, to the tune of $7,500,000. The case is still open.

25 days later he announced his participation in Syriza's national election list.

== Politics ==
For many years Kasselakis worked as a columnist for The National Herald, writing "The undergraduate's column" and later on "The Colour of the Market". Using the pen name "Aristotelis Oikonomou", he advocated in 2007 the adoption of supply-side reforms aligned with Reaganomics and New Democracy's reform allowing the opening of private universities in Greece. In 2012, during the Greek economic crisis, he criticized the number of public sector layoffs handled by then-minister Kyriakos Mitsotakis as very low and supported the reduction of the minimum wage. In September 2015 he criticized then-prime minister Alexis Tsipras, comparing him with Donald Trump and writing that he lacks sufficient experience. He also heavily criticized him for appointing Yanis Varoufakis as finance minister.

In 2023, Kasselakis stated that from 2012 he "had developed an excellent rapport with Kyriakos Mitsotakis" and that he "penned an endorsement for him in the National Herald while he was competing for the party leadership" and still has "a lot of respect for him personally". He later justified his stance, saying that he had supported Mitsotakis because he had some progressive ideas and because he was running against Adonis Georgiadis. In his National Herald editorial, published three days after the first round of ND party leadership elections and posted on Mitsotakis's Facebook page, Kasselakis made no reference to Georgiadis, criticized Vangelis Meimarakis and Alexis Tsipras, and endorsed Mitsotakis's candidacy.

=== Syriza leadership ===
His social contacts with members of Syriza's "Transparency Sector" were the reason for Kasselakis to approach the party. Members of the sector suggested that he join the think-tank of Syriza president Alexis Tsipras. This is how he met the party leader, who decided to include him on the 9th (non-electoral) in the legislative election of both May and June 2023, in order to form a "triad of excellence" of members of expatriate Hellenism. (Note: The trio of expatriate Greeks was completed by Harvard professor Othon Iliopoulos and Natasha Romanou, a researcher at NASA's Goddard Institute.)

On 29 August 2023, Kasselakis declared his candidacy for the leadership of Syriza. In the first round of party elections on 17 September, he finished in first place among five candidates while securing 45% of the vote. On 24 September 2023 he was elected new leader of Syriza, winning the second round with 56% of the vote over his opponent, Effie Achtsioglou, who received 44%. After winning the election, Kasselakis expressed the desire to emulate the U.S. Democratic Party and move to the centre-left arguing that Syriza must represent the patriotic left.

From the beginning of his tenure, Kasselakis' leadership has faced extensive criticism, particularly from left-leaning factions within Syriza, notably the Umbrella group led by former Minister of Finance Euclid Tsakalotos. In November 2023, amidst significant internal unrest and persistent disagreements, several Members of Parliament (MPs) and Members of the European Parliament (MEPs) publicly announced their departure from the party, expressing open criticism of Kasselakis. He has been accused of "right-wing populism" and authoritarian practices during his time leading Syriza. The factional disputes primarily stemmed from ideological differences and divergent perspectives on party management skills.

On 23 November 2023, a significant development occurred as nine MPs, one MEP, and 57 central committee members declared their departure from Syriza in protest of Kasselakis' leadership. Notable figures among them included Effi Achtsioglou along with other former ministers. Additionally, on 4 December, previously resigned MPs Euclid Tsakalotos and Peti Perka joined forces with the nine MPs to announce the establishment of a new political entity called "New Left" (Nea Aristera). In response, Kasselakis strongly criticized the newly formed party, urging the departing MPs to relinquish their positions to facilitate the appointment of replacement MPs. Journalists and politicians have proclaimed this series of resignations as the end of Syriza in its present form, attributing it to a schism initiated by Kasselakis in his role as the new party leader. This is largely attributed to his ideological ambiguity and questionable practices.

On 15 March 2024, Kasselakis temporarily suspended his political activities to undertake his mandatory military service for about three weeks at an artillery training camp near Thebes.

On 9 June 2024 he led Syriza in the 2024 EU elections suffering a nearly 40% decline in his party's vote share from the 2019 elections, many considered the outcome to be a defeat for Syriza. The party failed to win in any region of the country, including Chania, home of Kasselakis. Later in 2024, further criticism of his leadership arose due to the party's poor performance in the European elections, prompting several MPs and members of the political committee to demand explanations.

By September 2024, the party faced another internal crisis after Kasselakis suspended two MPs, Athina Linou and Pavlos Polakis, who had been embroiled in a conflict. Polakis was later reinstated, but Kasselakis' actions deepened existing divisions within the party. Polakis led a rebellion, calling for a leadership change, and by 7 September, this demand had gained significant traction among party members and MPs. Eighty-seven party members filed a motion of censure against Kasselakis, and Polakis subsequently announced his intention to begin a leadership campaign with the goal of replacing Kasselakis. The aforementioned motion passed on 8 September.

==== Cancelled leadership contest ====
Amidst political turmoil and disagreements regarding Kasselakis' approaches and agenda, MPs and members of the central committee of Syriza initiated a rebellion against Kasselakis' decision to conduct a survey asking the party's voters whether Syriza should alter its name and ideological focus. This action led to a proposal by the central committee to hold the second leadership contest within a year, asserting that Kasselakis' positions needed to be contested. Olga Gerovasili emerged as a potential candidate, while former prime minister Alexis Tsipras issued a statement openly criticizing Stefanos Kasselakis. The leadership contest was abandoned a few days later, after Gerovasili announced that she was unwilling to run.

=== Departure from Syriza ===
On 8 November 2024, Kasselakis announced his departure from Syriza to form his own political party (Movement for Democracy, later renamed Democrats – Progressive Centre) after Syriza's congress rejected his candidacy for the party leadership in upcoming elections.

== Personal life ==
Kasselakis lived in Miami until early 2023. He is openly gay and has been married to Tyler McBeth since 2023. He is an Orthodox Christian.

Kasselakis is the first openly gay leader of a major political party in Greece, and supported the legalization of same-sex marriage in the country by the Hellenic Parliament in February 2024.

=== Affiliation with the US Republican Party ===
In October 2023, controversy erupted when the Greek newspaper Estia published an article claiming that New York voter records indicated that Kasselakis was a registered member of the conservative Republican Party in the US. Kasselakis vehemently denied the allegations, characterizing the newspaper as "far-right guns" and asserted that the entire story was fabricated. A later article stated that Kasselakis appeared in online searchable New York voter lists as a Republican from 2013 to 2019.

== Notes ==
Party political offices
Preceded by Alexis Tsipras	Leader of Syriza; 2023–2024	Succeeded by Sokratis Famellos
