= Ministry of the Environment and Energy (Greece) =

Government ministry of Greece

- Υπουργείο Περιβάλλοντος και Ενέργειας
- Coat of arms of the Hellenic Republic

Agency overview
- Formed: September 2015
- Preceding agency: Ministry of Productive Reconstruction, the Environment and Energy (Jan. - Sept. 2015)
- Type: Ministry
- Jurisdiction: Greek government
- Headquarters: Athens
- Employees: 3.348 (2024); 815 (2016)
- Annual budget: 2.341.227.000 € (2025)
- Minister responsible: Stavros Papastavrou
- Deputy Ministers responsible: Nikos Tagaras; Nikos Tsafos
- Child agencies: General Secretariat for the Environment; General Secretariat for Spatial Planning and Urban Environment; General Secretariat for Energy and Mineral Resources; Special Secretariat for Water
- Key document: Εstablishment of the Μinistry of the environment and energy
- Website: ypen.gov.gr

The Ministry of the Environment and Energy (Greek: Υπουργείο Περιβάλλοντος και Ενέργειας) is a government department of Greece responsible for environmental and energy policy. It was created on 7 October 2009 as the Ministry of the Environment, Energy and Climate Change to succeed the Ministry for the Environment, Physical Planning and Public Works. The incumbent minister is Theodoros Skylakakis of New Democracy.

== List of ministers ==
=== Environment, energy and climate change (2009–2015) ===
Name	Took office	Left office	Party	Notes
Tina Birbili	7 October 2009	17 June 2011	PASOK	Cabinet of George Papandreou
Giorgos Papakonstantinou	17 June 2011	17 May 2012	PASOK	Cabinet of George Papandreou until 11 November 2011; Cabinet of Lucas Papademos thereafter
Gregory Tsaltas	17 May 2012	21 June 2012	Independent	Caretaker Cabinet of Panagiotis Pikrammenos
Evangelos Livieratos	21 June 2012	25 June 2013	Independent, proposed by PASOK	Coalition Cabinet of Antonis Samaras
Giannis Maniatis	25 June 2013	27 January 2015	PASOK	Coalition Cabinet of Antonis Samaras

=== Productive reconstruction, the environment and energy (2015) ===
Name	Took office	Left office	Party	Notes
Panagiotis Lafazanis	27 January 2015	18 July 2015	Syriza	First Cabinet of Alexis Tsipras
Panos Skourletis	18 July 2015	27 August 2015	Syriza	First Cabinet of Alexis Tsipras
Ioannis Golias	28 August 2015	21 September 2015	Independent	Caretaker Cabinet of Vassiliki Thanou-Christophilou

=== Environment and energy (since September 2015) ===
Name	Took office	Left office	Party	Notes
Panos Skourletis	23 September 2015	5 November 2016	Syriza	Second Cabinet of Alexis Tsipras
Giorgos Stathakis	5 November 2016	9 July 2019	Syriza	Second Cabinet of Alexis Tsipras
Kostis Hatzidakis	9 July 2019	5 January 2021	New Democracy	Cabinet of Kyriakos Mitsotakis
Kostas Skrekas	5 January 2021	26 May 2023	New Democracy	Cabinet of Kyriakos Mitsotakis
Pantelis Kapros	26 May 2023	27 June 25 2023	Independent	Caretaker Cabinet of Ioannis Sarmas
Theodoros Skylakakis	27 June 2023	14 March 2025	New Democracy	Second Cabinet of Kyriakos Mitsotakis
Stavros Papastavrou	14 March 2025	incumbent	New Democracy	Second Cabinet of Kyriakos Mitsotakis
