= Effie Achtsioglou =

Greek professor and politician

- Έφη Αχτσιόγλου
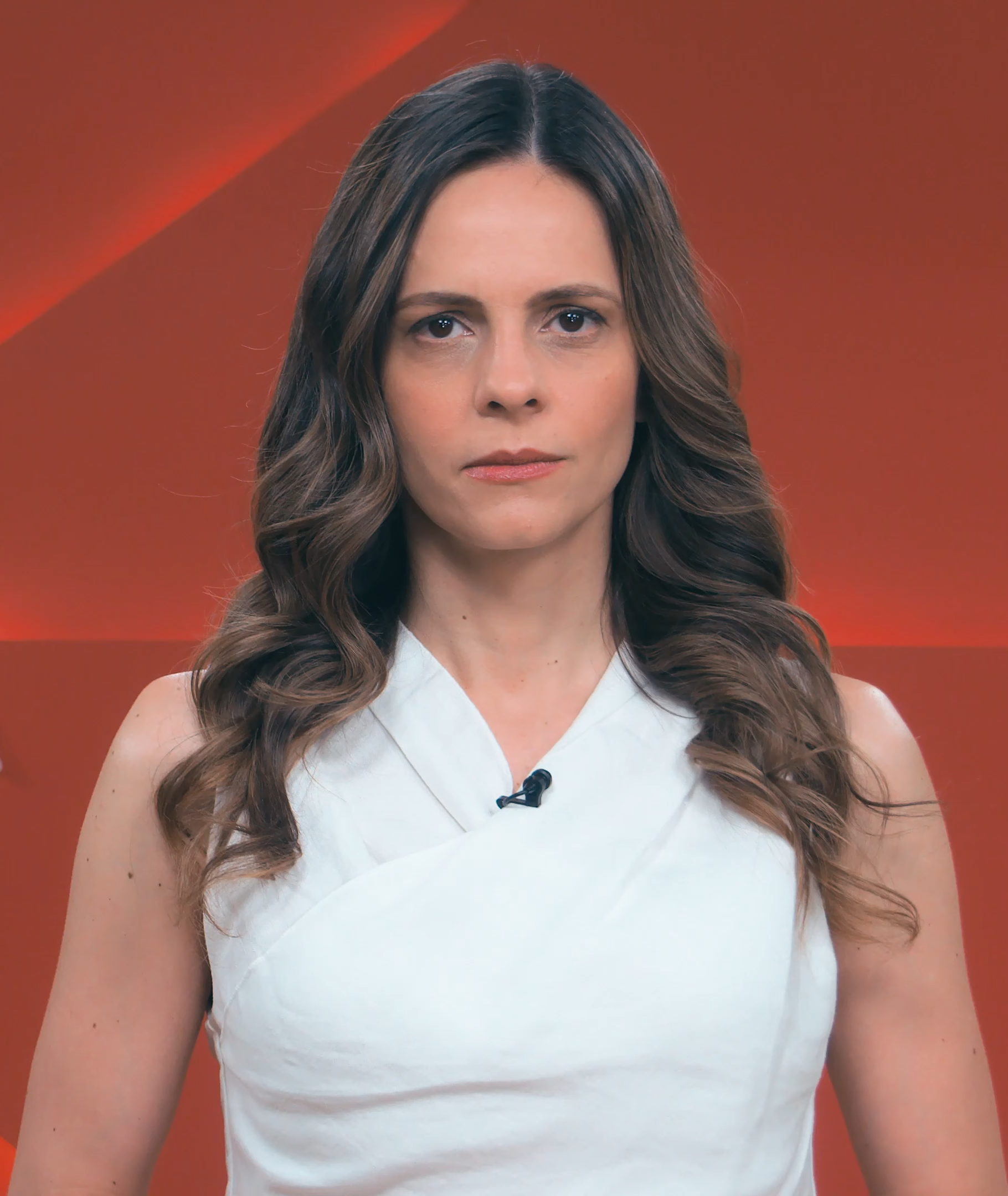
- Achtsioglou in 2022

Minister for Labour, Social Insurance and Social Solidarity
- In office 5 November 2016 – 9 July 2019
- Prime Minister: Alexis Tsipras
- Preceded by: George Katrougalos
- Succeeded by: Giannis Vroutsis

Member of the Parliament of Greece
- In office 7 July 2019 – 2 June 2026
- Constituency: Athens B2

Personal details
- Born: Eftychia Achtsioglou; 4 January 1985 (age 41) Giannitsa, Greece
- Party: Greek Left Alliance(Greece) (2026–present)
- Other political affiliations: Syriza (until 2023); New Left (2023–2026)
- Spouse: Dimitris Tzanakopoulos (m. 2019)
- Children: 1
- Education: Aristotle University of Thessaloniki
- Occupation: Politician; Lawyer

Eftychia "Effie" Achtsioglou (Greek: Ευτυχία Αχτσιόγλου; born 4 January 1985), is a Greek politician who served as Minister for Labour, Social Insurance and Social Solidarity from 2016 to 2019. She is a member of the Hellenic Parliament since July 2019 and a leading figure of the New Left since December 2023. She was a member of SYRIZA and an MP for the party until she left the party in November 2023 after losing the party's leadership election. She resigned from parliament in 2026.

== Early life and education ==
She was born in 1985, in Giannitsa. She completed her studies with the grade of Excellent in the AUTH Law School and in 2009 she acquired - again with the grade of Excellent - her postgraduate degree in Civil Law and Political Science from the same school.

She worked in the Centre of International and European Economic Law (CIEEL) as part of a research scholarship, while in 2014 she completed her studies in Labour Law under the supervision of professor Aris Kazakos as part of a scholarship in the State Scholarship Foundation .

== Occupation ==
Achtsioglou is a Thessaloniki lawyer. She was also a research partner of the SYRIZA EP group in Brussels starting July 2014.

Additionally, she worked in the European Parliament, alongside the Department of Civil Law, Political Procedure and Labour Law of the Law School of the Aristotle University from 2009 till 2013, and as a researcher in the Centre of International and European Economic Law (CIEEL).

== Political career ==
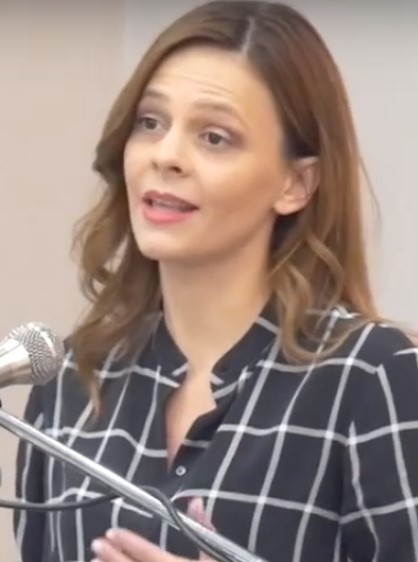
Achtsioglou in October 2018

In 2015 she stood as a candidate for the national ballot of SYRIZA in both the January as well as the September elections. Within SYRIZA she has steered party organs, both as a member of the central committee, and as a member of the A’ Thessaloniki committee.

As the executive of the political office of the Ministry of Labour, she was responsible for negotiations of the Greek government with the institutions on issues regarding the job market and social security. She has served as a member of the executive council of OAED and as a member of ASE.

=== Governmental positions (2016–2019) ===
From 5 November 2016 to 9 July 2019, she was the Minister for Labour, Social Insurance and Social Solidarity in the Tsipras II cabinet. During her tenure she was, among other things, linked to an expansion of collective bargaining, a rise of the general minimum wage by 11% and by 27% for young people specifically (650 Euros), the abolishment of sub-minimum wage, the lowering of unemployment and of unregistered employment, the creation of OPEKA and new procedures for adoption.

=== Greek MP (2019–2026) ===
For the 2019 election she was placed second on the national ballot list of SYRIZA and elected to the Hellenic Parliament.

In the June 2023 Greek legislative election she was elected as an MP representing the B2 Western Athens Constituency. Following the decision of Alexis Tsipras to step down as party leader, she announced on 12 July 2023 that she would run for the office of the President of SYRIZA. However, her bid for the SYRIZA leadership was defeated by her rival Stefanos Kasselakis on 24 September 2023.

In November 2023 she left Syriza with 10 other MPs and on 5 December 2023, she became a member of New Left parliamentary group. She left the New Left, along with six other MPs, on 2 June 2026 after disagreements with party leadership, and subsequently resigned her seat in parliament entirely. She was replaced by Yannis Dragasakis, who joined the SYRIZA group.

In October of the same year she joined the Greek Left Alliance.

== Personal life ==
During her election campaign in 2019, she revealed that she was in a relationship with then Minister of State Dimitris Tzanakopoulos. In January 2021 she stated that she was expecting a child.

== Works ==
Monographies:

- Ε. Αχτσιόγλου, Ι. Κουμασίδης και Σ. Μίτας. (2012). ‘Ξαναπιάνοντας το νήμα...για τη σχέση δημοκρατίας και σοσιαλισμού’, εκδ. Θύραθεν.
- E. Achtsioglou, (2010). Sustainable Development and Its Judicial Review in Greek Case Law: A conceptual and methodological analysis. LAP Lambert Academic Publishing.

Articles and chapters in collective works:

- E. Achtsioglou / M. Doherty (2014). There Must Be Some Way Out of Here...The Crisis, Labour Rights and Member States in the Eye of the Storm, European Law Journal, 20: 219 – 240.
- Ε. Αχτσιόγλου (2014). Η απόσπαση εργαζομένων κατά την παροχή υπηρεσιών στην ενωσιακή έννομη τάξη: Χαρακτηριστικό πεδίο έντασης μεταξύ των εθνικών συστημάτων εργατικoύ δικαίου και των κανόνων της ενιαίας αγοράς, σε Α. Καζάκου και Α. Στεργίου (επιμ.), Το «Νέο» Εργατικό Δίκαιο, Τιμητικός Τόμος Ιωάννη Κουκιάδη, εκδ. Σάκκουλα: 185–209.
- Ε. Αχτσιόγλου (2013). Δημόσιο συμφέρον και συλλογική αυτονομία: Η υποχρέωση επαγρύπνησης του δικαστή της συνταγματικότητας, ΕΕργΔ 2013, 1: 1–13.
- E. Achtsioglou (2013). Greece 2010–2012: labour in the maelstrom of deregulation, Transfer: European Review of Labour and Research, 19: 125–127.
- Γ. Κατρούγκαλος / Ε. Αχτσιόγλου (2012). «Μνημονιακές» πολιτικές και Εργατικό Δίκαιο, Ειδικό τεύχος στη μνήμη του Α. Καρδαρά, 17: 1333–1358.
- E. Achtsioglou / M. Rocca (2012). Trade unions, collective bargaining and collective action beyond the EU and its Court of Justice: A tale of shrinking immunities and sparkling new competences from the land of the Lesser Depression, Atelier de Droit Social (AdDS) Working Papers, 1: 1- 39.
- E. Achtsioglou (2011). The judicial treatment of the conflicts between trade union rights and economic freedoms in EU legal order: a critical analysis of the ECJ rulings in Laval and Viking cases, σε: Th. SAKELLAROPOULOS / A. STERGIOU (επιμ.), Posted workers in Europe: The cases of Greece and Bulgaria, Scientific Society for Social Cohesion and Development Press, Athens, 63–104.

Political offices
Preceded by George Katrougalos	Greek Minister for Labour and Social Solidarity; 5 November 2016 – 8 July 2019	Succeeded by Giannis Vroutsis
