= Kolotoumba (term) =

Greek political slang term for political reversal

The front page of the Belgian newspaper De Standaard.

The term "kolotoumba" or "kolotumba" (Greek: κωλοτούμπα, meaning somersault) has been widely used by media and politicians in Greece to indicate the political inconsistency and complete reversal of a party or political figure from their original political positions or views.

This Greek term was internationalized especially after the summer of 2015 - on the occasion of Alexis Tsipras' total political transformation and his agreement with the "Troika" - and was widely used by the international media to describe this phenomenon.

== History ==
Politically, the term was used by politicians in Greece, but quite rarely. It began to be mentioned very frequently in several Greek media outlets after 2015 to characterize the total political shift of then-Prime Minister Alexis Tsipras after the "no" vote in the referendum he called and his agreement with the "Troika" in July 2015. However, since then it has been widely used for any politician who radically changes his views.

Τhe more polite term κυβίστηση, also meaning somersault, was also used metaphorically to describe a politician retreating from their original views or positions, and a complete reversal in relation to what they initially supported.

== Internationalization ==
According to a source, "the word (kolotumba) has dominated and characterizes the Greek political scene and the majority of parties and their representatives and, for those who don't know, it has been informally adopted in Brussels. It is pronounced with a slightly foreign accent in the corridors of the Commission when they want to characterize how someone has made a complete change from what they previously supported."

The term appeared in January 2015, just a few days after the formation of the Alexis Tsipras Government, in the German newspaper Die Zeit. In April of the same year, it was used in an article in the British newspaper Financial Times. In July of the same year, it appeared on the front page of the Belgian newspaper De Standaard. It was followed by a number of international media outlets.

In 2017, the Spanish newspaper El País, explaining that it is a Greek political term (Kolotumba es un concepto politico griego), used it to refer to a political event in Spain. Specifically, the article referred to the Catalan "kolotumba", according to the newspaper, i.e. the revocation of the declaration of independence of Catalonia by the regional Catalan parliament within a week. The same year, the term was used again by the Financial Times to criticize then-Prime Minister Theresa May for her political stance regarding Brexit.

In 2019 the term was used by the Portuguese newspaper Público.

== Sources ==
- "Η «κωλοτούμπα» έγινε διεθνής πολιτικός όρος". ΠΟΛΙΤΗΣ (in Greek). 2017-10-12.
- Τζίμας, Σταύρος (2015-01-26). "Η «κωλοτούμπα» στο πολιτικό λεξιλόγιο". Η ΚΑΘΗΜΕΡΙΝΗ (in Greek).
- Γιαννακά, Σοφία (2021-07-05). "Όταν η kolotoumpa έγινε διεθνής όρος". iefimerida.gr (in Greek).
