= Ochi concert (2015) =

2015 political concert

Oxi concert
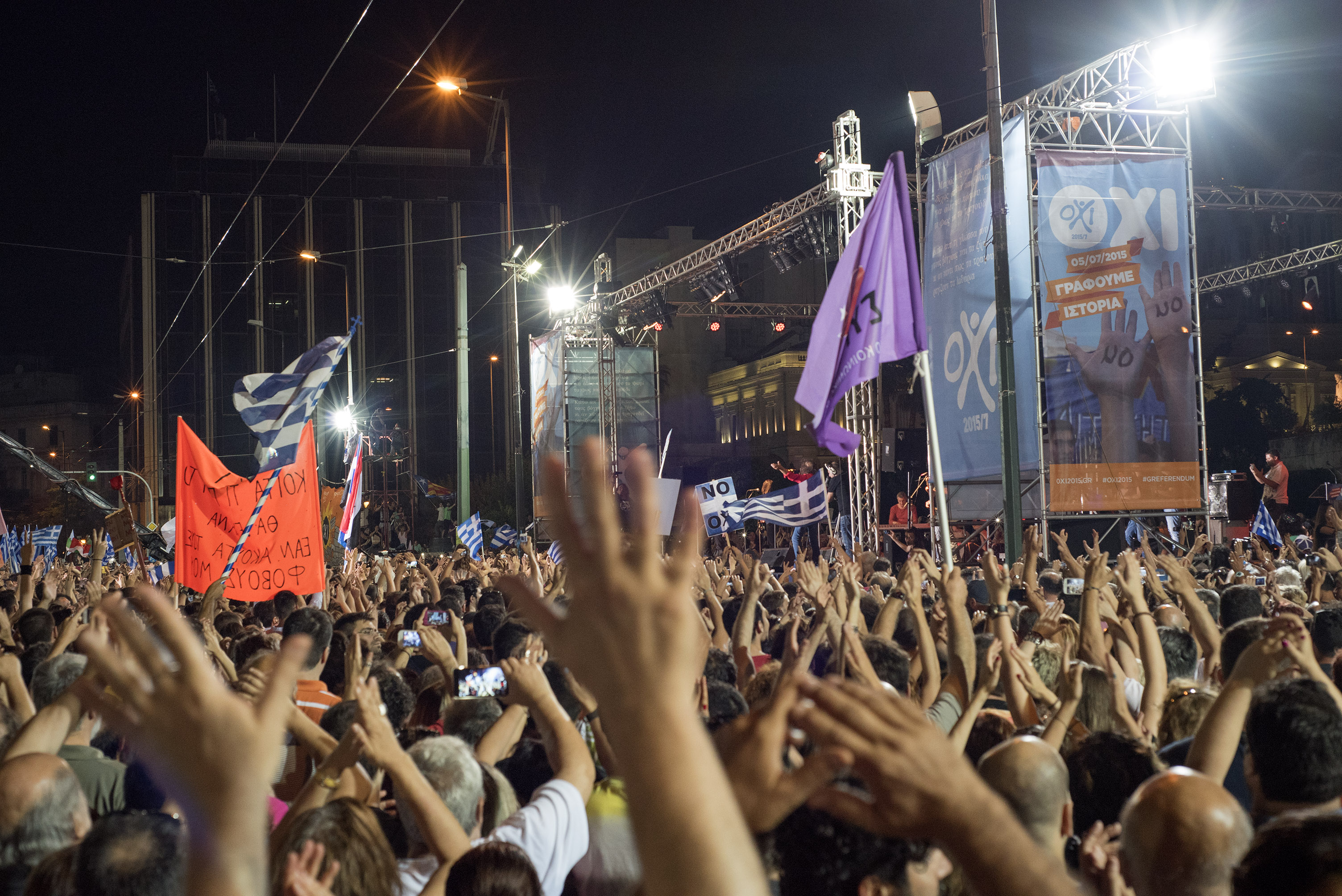
- Vasilis Papakonstantinou onstage of the Oxi concert.
- Genre: Pop; Rock
- Dates: 3 July 2015; 11 years ago
- Locations: Syntagma square in Athens, Greece
- Attendance: 350,000
- Website: web.archive.org/web/2017*/oxi2015.gr

The Oxi concert was a concert/Rally held on Friday 3 July 2015 in Syntagma square to support the NO vote in the 2015 Greek bailout referendum. Performers included Thanos Mikroutsikos, Vasilis Papakonstantinou, Alkinoos Ioannidis, Rita Antonopoulou, Afroditi Manou, Sokratis Malamas, Rallia Xristidou, Kostas Thomaidis, Electric Litany, Iro, Eleni Vitali and Chainides. It is estimated that more than 350,000 people attended the concert. It was broadcast live by ERT1.

The Prime minister of Greece Alexis Tsipras made a 10-minute speech. Many Members of the Greek government and the SYRIZA party like Zoi Konstantopoulou, Nikos Pappas and Yanis Varoufakis attended the concert.

The main slogans were "For the Greece of dignity, For the Europe of democracy" and "We're writing history".

Scenes from the event were included in the documentaries Agora II:Chained and This is a Coup.

== Background ==
After the Prime Minister declared the Referendum, 200 artists signed a declaration supporting the No vote. The concert was organized by the performers and SYRIZA. The concert was announced for the 3 July 2015 at 7:30pm, with the organizers stating "We are giving an answer to the fear climate they want to impose, with our songs, with our loud voice". The concert started a little after 8:30pm. It was broadcast live by the state-owned Tv station ERT1, the radio station Sto kokkino 105,5 and Ruptly.

At the same time another concert was held in Thessaloniki with Thanasis Papakonstantinou, Matoula Zamani and Giorgos Kazantzis performing.

In December 2015, the third episode of the documentary series This is a Coup which is centered around Tsipras' presence in the event, was released.

== Performances ==
Performer(s)	Performed song(s)
Electric Litany	Enemy
Giorgos Merantzas	Poios ti zoi mou I dikopi zoi
Iro	Autous pou vlepeis Tha simanoun oi kampanes Ligo akoma
Rallia Xristidou	An metrithoume Kripsou
Alkinoos Ioannidis	Panta tha ksimeronei Patrida; Autos o kosmos pou allazei
Thanos Mikroutsikos Rita Antonopoulou	Mikrokosmos
Thanos Mikroutsikos Kostas Thomaidis	Ki ithele akomi
Thanos Mikroutsikos Afroditi Manou	Tous exo varethei
Thanos Mikroutsikos Afroditi Manou Rita Antonopoulou Kostas Thomaidis	Erotiko
Sokratis Malamas	Gia tin Ellada; Ta paidia mes stin plateia O mermigas
Xristos Thivaios Sokratis Malamas	Διάφανος
Vasilis Papakonstantinou Xristos Thivaios	Oxi se ola Tritos Pagkosmios; Efiva gerakia Xairetismata; To paixnidi paizete akoma Tis dikaiosynis ilie noite
Eleni Vitali	Ti romiosyni min tin klais Ax! Ellada
Chainides	I leventia einai mia pligi

- Presenter: Pasxalis Tsarouxas

== Tsipras Speech ==
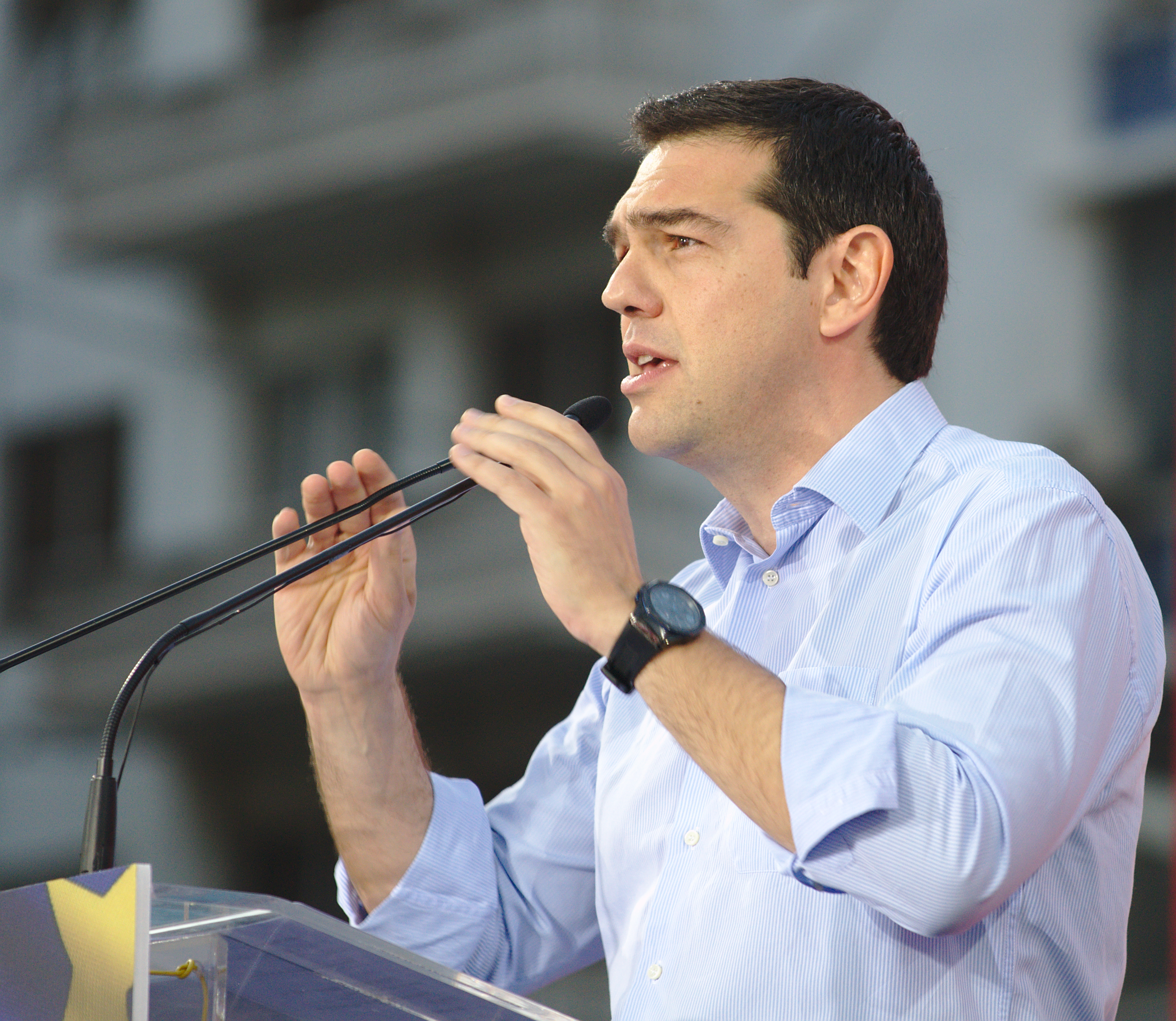
Tsipras speaking in a previous rally

The Prime Minister of Greece Alexis Tsipras in his 10-minute speech mentioned:

...today we are not demonstrating, we are celebrating, we are celebrating democracy... ...on Sunday we aren't just deciding to remain in Europe, we are deciding to live with dignity in Europe, to live as equals in Europe... ...whatever the result may be on sunday, on Monday the greek people have nothing to divide with each other. We will fight together to build a better greece.
