= Greek withdrawal from the eurozone =

Hypothetical Greek withdrawal from the Euro currency

A Greek withdrawal from the eurozone was a hypothetical scenario, debated mostly in the early to mid 2010s, under which Greece would withdraw from the Eurozone to deal with the Greek government-debt crisis of the time. This conjecture was given the nickname "Grexit", a blend word combining the English words 'Greek' and 'exit', and which has been expressed in Greek as ellexodos (ελλέξοδος from Ελλάς + έξοδος (Hellas + exodos)). The term "Graccident" (accidental Grexit) was coined for the case that Greece exited the EU and the euro unintentionally. These terms first came into use in 2012 and have been revitalised at each of the bailouts made available to Greece after that.

Proponents of the proposal argued that leaving the euro and reintroducing the drachma would dramatically boost exports and tourism, while discouraging expensive imports, which would give the Greek economy the possibility to recover and stand on its own feet.

Opponents argued that the proposal would impose excessive hardship on the Greek people, the short-term effects would be a significant consumption and wealth reduction for the Greek population. This had the potential to cause civil unrest in Greece and harm the reputation of the eurozone. Additionally, it could cause Greece to align more with non-EU states.

== Positions of eurozone governments ==
During the 2015 negotiations over a third financial assistance programme for Greece, several eurozone governments treated a Greek exit from the eurozone as a possible or acceptable outcome. These positions did not result in a formal eurozone decision to remove Greece from the currency union, and eurozone leaders ultimately agreed in July 2015 to open negotiations for a third Greek bailout package.

Germany played the most prominent role in putting a temporary Grexit option on the negotiating table. In July 2015, Reuters reported that the German government had argued that Greece could take a five-year "time-out" from the eurozone, with possible debt relief, if Athens did not improve its proposals for a bailout agreement. German finance minister Wolfgang Schäuble later said that some members of the German government would have preferred a temporary Greek exit from the eurozone to another bailout deal. Reuters also reported that Schäuble continued to regard a temporary Grexit as potentially the better option even after the bailout talks proceeded.

Finland also adopted a hard line during the same negotiations. Finnish broadcaster Yle reported that, after finance minister Alexander Stubb said Finland had not supported a Greek exit from the euro, Finland's policy line was made public and included the view that Greece could find a "sustainable solution" by temporarily exiting the single currency. Earlier reports stated that Finland was prepared to reject Greece's request for a third bailout, partly because of domestic political pressure within the Finnish governing coalition.

Other eurozone governments were described by contemporary reporting as being open to Grexit or taking a hard line on the conditions for Greece to remain in the eurozone. The Guardian classified Germany, Austria, the Netherlands, Belgium, Finland, Slovakia, Lithuania, Latvia and Malta as "open to Grexit" during the July 2015 negotiations, while distinguishing them from countries such as France and Italy, which argued more strongly for keeping Greece in the currency union. The same report cited Slovakia's finance minister Peter Kažimír as arguing that an amicable split between Greece and the eurozone would be preferable to allowing either Greece or the currency bloc to become a "zombie state".

By contrast, France and Italy publicly opposed Grexit during the July 2015 negotiations. French president François Hollande said there could be no temporary Grexit, while Italian prime minister Matteo Renzi argued against the humiliation of Greece and supported keeping the country in the eurozone.

== Detailed events ==
The term 'Grexit' was coined by the Citigroup economist Ebrahim Rahbari and was introduced by Rahbari and Citigroup's Global Chief Economist Willem H. Buiter on 6 February 2012.

On 27 January 2015, two days after an early election of the Greek parliament, Alexis Tsipras, leader of the new Syriza ("Coalition of the Radical Left") party, formed a new government. He appointed Yanis Varoufakis as Minister of Finance, a particularly important post in view of the government debt crisis. During 2015 and 2016, the chance of a Grexit or even a 'Graccident' (accidental Grexit) in the near future was widely discussed.

After the announcement of the bailout referendum on 27 June 2015 speculation rose. That day BBC News reported that "default appears inevitable", though it later removed the online statement. On 29 June 2015 it was announced that Greek banks would remain closed all week, cash withdrawals from banks would be limited to €60 per day, and international money transfers would be limited to urgent pre-approved commercial transfers.

== Background ==
=== IMF's projection ===
The International Monetary Fund (IMF) acknowledged that its forecasts for the Greek economy had been too optimistic. In its review of Greece's first bailout programme, the IMF stated that the programme had given the eurozone time to build a firewall to protect other vulnerable members, but that macroeconomic outcomes had been worse than expected. In 2012, Greece's unemployment rate reached about 25 percent, compared with an IMF projection of about 15 percent. The IMF also conceded that it had underestimated the damage that austerity programmes would do to the Greek economy, and that, in relation to Greece's debt, it should have considered debt restructuring earlier.

View source data.

The IMF's forecast in the 2010 Stand-By Arrangement projected that Greece would return to real GDP growth after 2011. In practice, the economy continued to contract, and Greek real GDP in 2013 was about 76 percent of its 2008 level.

== Dynamics ==
=== Financial dynamics ===
In mid-May 2012, the financial crisis in Greece and the impossibility of forming a new government after elections led to strong speculation that Greece would leave the eurozone shortly. This phenomenon had already become known as "Grexit".

Economists who favour this approach to solve the Greek debt crisis argue that a default is unavoidable for Greece in the long term, and that a delay in organising an orderly default (by lending Greece more money throughout a few more years) would just wind up hurting EU lenders and neighbouring European countries even more. Fiscal austerity or a euro exit is the alternative to accepting differentiated government bond yields within the Euro Area. If Greece remains in the euro while accepting higher bond yields, reflecting its high government deficit, then high interest rates would dampen demand, raise savings and slow the economy. An improved trade performance and less reliance on foreign capital would be the result.

The implementation of Grexit would have to occur "within days or even hours of the decision being made" due to the high volatility that would result. It would have to be timed at one of the public holidays in Greece.

=== International law dynamics ===
One US economist has argued that the legal grounds upon which the "troika", composed by the EU Commission, the European Central Bank and the IMF, has pursued the harsh macroeconomic adjustment plans imposed on Greece are shaky, claiming they infringe upon Greece's sovereignty and interfere in the internal affairs of an independent EU nation-state: "the overt infringements on Greek sovereignty we're witnessing today, with EU policy makers now double-checking all national data and carefully 'monitoring' the work of the Greek government sets a dangerous precedent."

He argues that a withdrawal from the Eurozone would give the Greek government more room for maneuver to conduct public policies propitious for long-term growth and social equity.

== 2012 Plan Z ==
"Plan Z" is the name given to a 2012 plan to enable Greece to withdraw from the eurozone in the event of Greek bank collapse. It was drawn up in absolute secrecy by small teams totalling approximately two dozen officials at the EU Commission (Brussels), the European Central Bank (Frankfurt) and the IMF (Washington). Those officials were headed by Jörg Asmussen (ECB), Thomas Wieser (Euro working group), Poul Thomsen (IMF) and Marco Buti (European Commission). To prevent premature disclosure no single document was created, no emails were exchanged, and no Greek officials were informed. The plan was based on the 2003 introduction of new dinars into Iraq by the Americans and would have required rebuilding the Greek economy and banking system ab initio, including isolating Greek banks by disconnecting them from the TARGET2 system, closing ATMs, and imposing capital and currency controls.

== Implementation ==
The prospect of Greece leaving the euro and dealing with a devalued drachma prompted many people to start withdrawing their euros from the country's banks. In the nine months to March 2012, deposits in Greek banks had already fallen 13% to €160,000,000,000.

A victory for anti-bailout lawmakers in the 17 June 2012 election would likely trigger an even bigger bank run, said Dimitris Mardas, associate professor of economics at the University of Thessaloniki. Greek authorities, Mardas predicted, would respond by imposing controls on the movement of money for as long as it takes for the panic to subside.

Against this plan, a political initiative, the so-called Menoume Europi was founded in 2012 by students in Oxford University, and it spread among Greek students in other European universities. The first demonstration took place in Athens, Syntagma Square in June 2012 in between two major elections that brought to the country political instability and financial insecurity.

A Grexit, assuming that it coincided with adoption of a new currency, would require preparation, for example with capacity for banknote stamping or printing a stock of new banknotes. However, information leaking out on such preparations might lead to negative dynamic effects, like bank runs. Conversely, leaving the Eurozone, but retaining the Euro as de facto currency, would avoid the practical issues and relieve the country of the burden of its Eurozone responsibilities.

In the event of a new currency being introduced, all banks would close for several days to allow old (Euro) banknotes to be stamped to denote that they were now drachmas, and/or a newly printed currency to be distributed to bank branches for distribution to the public when banks reopened. The British money printing company De La Rue was, according to rumours on 18 May 2012, preparing to print new drachma notes based on old moulds, which De La Rue refused to comment. The typical time between an order for a new currency being placed and the delivery of the banknotes is about six months.

=== Wolfson Economics Prize ===
In July 2012, the Wolfson Economics Prize, a prize for the "best proposal for a country to leave the European Monetary Union", was awarded to a Capital Economics team led by Roger Bootle, for their submission titled "Leaving the Euro: A Practical Guide". The winning proposal argued that a member wishing to exit should introduce a new currency and default on a large part of its debts. The net effect, the proposal claimed, would be positive for growth and prosperity. It also called for keeping the euro for small transactions and for a short period of time after the exit from the eurozone, along with a strict regime of inflation-targeting and tough fiscal rules monitored by "independent experts".

The Roger Bootle/Capital Economics plan also suggested that "key officials" should meet "in secret" one month before the exit is publicly announced, and that eurozone partners and international organisations should be informed "three days before". The judges of the Wolfson Economics Prize found that the winning plan was the "most credible solution" to the question of a member state leaving the eurozone.

== Immediate economic fallout inside Greece ==
On 29 May 2012, the National Bank of Greece (not to be confused with the central bank, the Bank of Greece) warned that "[a]n exit from the euro would lead to a significant decline in the living standards of Greek citizens." According to the announcement, per capita income would fall by 55%, the new national currency would depreciate by 65% vis-à-vis the euro, and the recession would deepen to 22%. Furthermore, unemployment would rise from its current 22% to 34% of the work force, and inflation, which was then at 2%, would soar to 30%.

According to the Greek think-tank Foundation for Economic and Industrial Research (IOBE), a new drachma would lose half or more of its value relative to the euro. This would drive up inflation, and reduce the purchasing power of the average Greek. At the same time, the country's economic output would drop, putting more people out of work where one in five is already unemployed. The prices of imported goods would skyrocket, putting them out of reach for many.

Analyst Vangelis Agapitos estimated that inflation under the new drachma would quickly reach 40 to 50 per cent to catch up with the fall in the new currency's value. To stop the falling value of the drachma, interest rates would have to be increased to as high as 30 to 40 per cent, according to Agapitos. People would then be unable to pay off their loans and mortgages and the country's banks would have to be nationalised to stop them from going under, he predicted.

IOBE head of research Aggelos Tsakanikas foresaw an increase in crime as a consequence of a Grexit, as people struggled to pay bills. "We won’t see tanks in the streets and violence, we won’t see people starving in the streets, but crime could very well rise".

== Political opinion ==
Greek political parties differed in their positions on a possible withdrawal from the eurozone. The centre-right New Democracy party claimed that SYRIZA was open to withdrawal from the euro. In 2012, SYRIZA leader Alexis Tsipras stated that "the currency is not a fetish" and that SYRIZA would reject continued eurozone membership if the cost for the Greek people was too great. A few days later, he said that Greece should not leave the eurozone and return to the drachma because "...we will have poor people, who have drachmas, and rich people, who will buy everything with euros." Opinion polling at the time indicated that most Greeks favoured keeping the euro.

Among the parties that won seats in the May 2012 parliamentary election, the Communist Party of Greece (KKE) supported withdrawal from both the eurozone and the European Union. Its General Secretary, Dimitris Koutsoumpas, later argued that withdrawal from the EU and the euro would be a "hazardous" course unless combined with a broader socialist programme, including socialisation of concentrated means of production, unilateral cancellation of debt, and what the party described as working-class and popular power.

Golden Dawn also opposed Greece's participation in the European Union and the eurozone.

On 21 August 2015, 25 MPs from SYRIZA split from the party and formed Popular Unity, which supported leaving the euro. In the September 2015 Greek legislative election, the party received 2.8% of the popular vote and won no seats.

The Greek government and the European Commission publicly supported Greece remaining in the eurozone during the 2015 crisis. In June 2015, Greek Finance Minister Yanis Varoufakis said that Greece was determined to remain part of the eurozone, although it would not accept a settlement that it regarded as unviable. The European Commission also opposed a Greek exit. In March 2015, Commission President Jean-Claude Juncker said that the Commission's position was that there would be no Grexit and that Greece would remain a member of the currency union. However, some commentators argued that a Greek exit was likely. In February 2015, the former head of the Federal Reserve, Alan Greenspan, said it was "just a matter of time" before Greece withdrew from the eurozone, while former United Kingdom Chancellor of the Exchequer Kenneth Clarke described such an exit as inevitable.

In 2015, The Guardian reported that a leaked British government document stated that, during informal discussions with another European leader, then UK Prime Minister David Cameron had suggested that Greece might be better off outside the eurozone.

== Economic criticism ==
Richard Koo, chief economist for Nomura Research Institute, accused IMF and EU of basing their negotiation position on unrealistic assumptions. As Koo pointed out, IMF's argument was that if the austerity programme had been implemented as assumed, no further debt relief would have been needed under 2012's framework. The EU's argument was that Greece encountered a difficult situation in 2015 because it delayed implementation of structural reforms. Koo said that the argument was highly unrealistic because structural reforms do not work in a short run, adding that the US did not benefit from the Reaganomics structural reforms during Reagan's era. After publishing documents which admit that the southern European country needs debt relief and a moratorium on debt repayment for 30 years, the IMF was only "slowly beginning to understand" the Greek economy, said Koo. A further line of criticism concerned the allocation of bailout funds and the delay in restructuring Greek public debt. A 2016 study by Jörg Rocholl and Axel Stahmer of the European School of Management and Technology estimated that, of €215.9 billion distributed under the first and second Greek adjustment programmes, only €9.7 billion, or less than 5 percent, directly contributed to the Greek fiscal budget. The study found that €139.2 billion, or more than 64 percent, was used for debt repayment and interest payments, €37.3 billion, or 17 percent, was used to recapitalise Greek banks, and €29.7 billion, or 14 percent, was used as incentives connected with the 2012 private-sector involvement debt restructuring.

The IMF's ex post evaluation of the 2010 Stand-By Arrangement also criticised the absence of debt restructuring at the start of the programme. It stated that private creditors were able to significantly reduce their exposure to Greek government debt between 2010 and 2012, and that delayed restructuring shifted debt into official hands, leaving taxpayers and the official sector exposed. The report also concluded that not addressing Greece's debt problem decisively at the outset likely aggravated the contraction in output, although it also noted that the programme gave the euro area time to build a firewall against wider contagion.

== 2015 Grexit speculation ==
In January 2015, speculation about a Greek exit from the eurozone was revived when Michael Fuchs, deputy leader of the center-right CDU/CSU faction in the German Bundestag, was quoted on 31 December 2014: "The time when we had to rescue Greece is over. There is no more blackmail potential. Greece is not systemically relevant for the euro." A following article in the weekly Spiegel citing sources from Wolfgang Schäuble's ministry of finance further spurred these speculations. Both German and international media widely interpreted this as the Merkel government tacitly warning Greek voters from voting for SYRIZA in the upcoming legislative election of 25 January 2015.

Germany's largest selling tabloid, the right-wing populist Bild, raised further anger when it compared Greece to an unfair footballer: "What happens to a footballer who breaks the rules and does a crude foul? – He leaves the pitch. He is sent off as a punishment. No question."

The German government's interference in the January 2015 elections in Greece was strongly criticized by leaders of European Parliament groups including Socialists & Democrats (S&D), the liberal ALDE and the Greens/EFA group, when S&D president Gianni Pittella said, "German right-wing forces trying to act like a sheriff in Greece or any other member states is not only unacceptable but above all wrong." It has also been criticized by the German opposition party The Greens', with its speaker Simone Peter calling the debate over a Grexit "highly irresponsible".

Economists of German Commerzbank said that preventing a Greek exit was still desirable for Germany, since a Greek exit would wipe out billions of euros in European taxpayer money, and "it would be much easier politically to renegotiate a compromise with Greece, albeit a lame one, and thus maintain the fiction that Greece will pay back its loans at some point in time."

FTSE "considers Grexit following the election to be highly unlikely...".

On 9 February, UK Prime Minister David Cameron chaired a meeting to discuss any possible ramifications in the event of an exit. According to a Bloomberg report George Osborne said at the meeting of the G-20 finance ministers in Istanbul: "A Greek exit from the euro would be very difficult for the world economy and potentially very damaging for the European economy."

In February 2015, the Russian government stated that it would offer Greece aid but would only provide it in rubles.

Kathimerini reported that after 16 February Eurogroup talks Commerzbank AG increased the risk of Greece exiting the euro to 50%. The expression used by Time for these talks is "Greece and the Euro Zone dance on the precipice".

After an emergency meeting of eurozone finance ministers (20 February 2015), European leaders agreed to extend Greece's bailout for further four months.

By late June 2015 negotiations on a deal had collapsed, and Prime Minister Alexis Tsipras called a referendum for 5 July on the revised proposals from the IMF and the EU, which he said that his government would campaign against. The referendum was defeated by a margin of 61% to 39%. Eurozone finance ministers have refused to extend the bailout.

Questioned on whether the referendum would be a euro-drachma dilemma, Greece's finance minister, Yanis Varoufakis, said that European Treaties make provisions for an exit from the EU but do not make any provisions for an exit from the Eurozone. A referendum as a choice involving exit from the Eurozone would violate EU Treaties and EU Law.

== Theorized effects on world economies ==
=== Effect upon the European economy ===
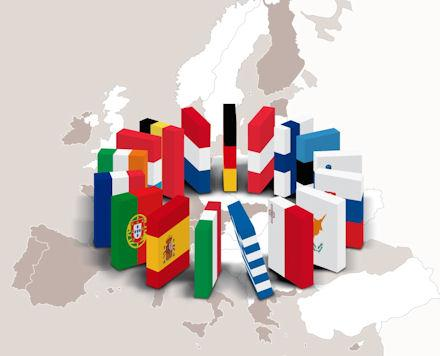
A political cartoon of the "domino effect" view of a Grexit

Claudia Panseri, head of equity strategy at Société Générale, speculated in late May 2012 that eurozone stocks could plummet up to 50 percent in value if Greece makes a disorderly exit from the eurozone. Bond yields in other European nations could widen 1 percent point to 2 percent points, negatively affecting their ability to service their own sovereign debts.

=== Effect upon the world economy ===
Europe in 2010 accounted for 25 percent of world trade, according to Deutsche Bank. Economic depression within the European economy would ripple worldwide and slow global growth. However, Greece represents just a small fraction—less than 2 per cent—of European gross domestic product (GDP).

== Legality ==
A working paper published 2009 by the European Central Bank concluded:

… that negotiated withdrawal from the EU would not be legally impossible even prior to the ratification of the Lisbon Treaty, and that unilateral withdrawal would undoubtedly be legally controversial; that, while permissible, a recently enacted exit clause is, prima facie, not in harmony with the rationale of the European unification project and is otherwise problematic, mainly from a legal perspective; that a Member State's exit from EMU, without a parallel withdrawal from the EU, would be legally inconceivable; and that, while perhaps feasible through indirect means, a Member State's expulsion from the EU or EMU, would be legally next to impossible.

In the absence of any ruling by the European Court of Justice, the question of whether a country can unilaterally leave the Eurozone without leaving the EU is unclear. Jens Christian Dammann, a law professor at the University of Texas, has suggested that under certain conditions, it is possible for a Member State to do so.

== Developments after 2018 ==
After Greece exited its third economic adjustment programme on 20 August 2018, discussion of a Greek withdrawal from the eurozone became largely retrospective.

== See also ==
- 2015 Greek bailout referendum
- Brexit - A term with a similar origin
- Currency substitution
- Greek government-debt crisis
- Multi-speed Europe
- Withdrawal from the European Union
- Withdrawal from the Eurozone
