= Greek Independence Day Parade (New York City) =

Annual parade in the United States

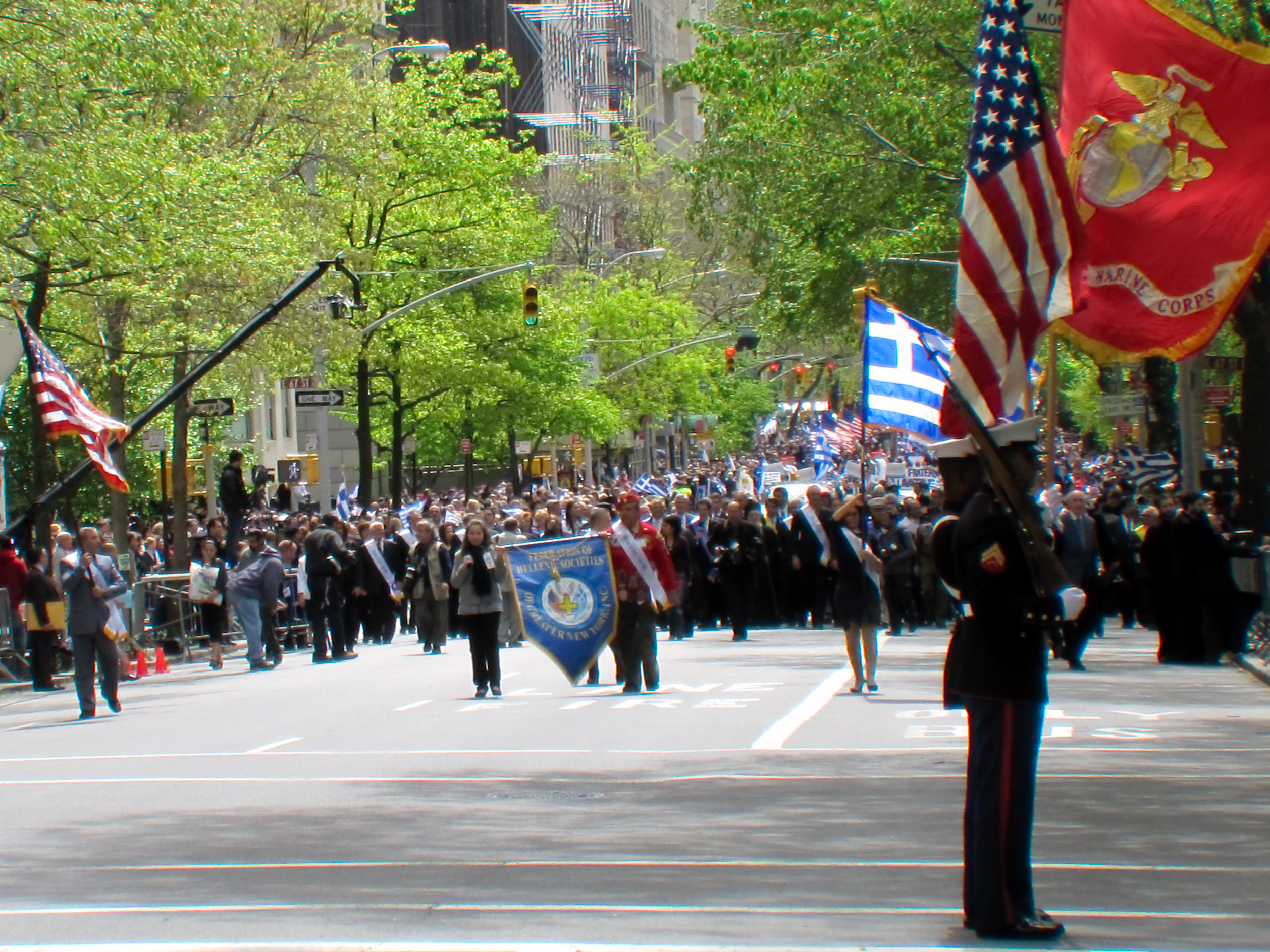
- 2010 parade
- Status: Active
- Genre: Parade
- Frequency: Every April
- Venue: Fifth Avenue, Manhattan, New York City
- Country: United States
- Next event: March 30, 2025
- Sponsor: Federation of Hellenic Societies of Greater New York
- Website: hellenicsocieties.org

The Greek Independence Day Parade takes place annually in the United States along Fifth Avenue in the Manhattan borough of New York City. The parade is held annually in April in honor of the Anniversary of Greek Declaration of Independence from the Ottoman Empire on March 25, 1821, and the Greek War of Independence. The parade attracts many Greek Americans from the Tri-State area and is the celebration of Greek heritage, Greek culture, and Greek achievements in the world.

== History ==
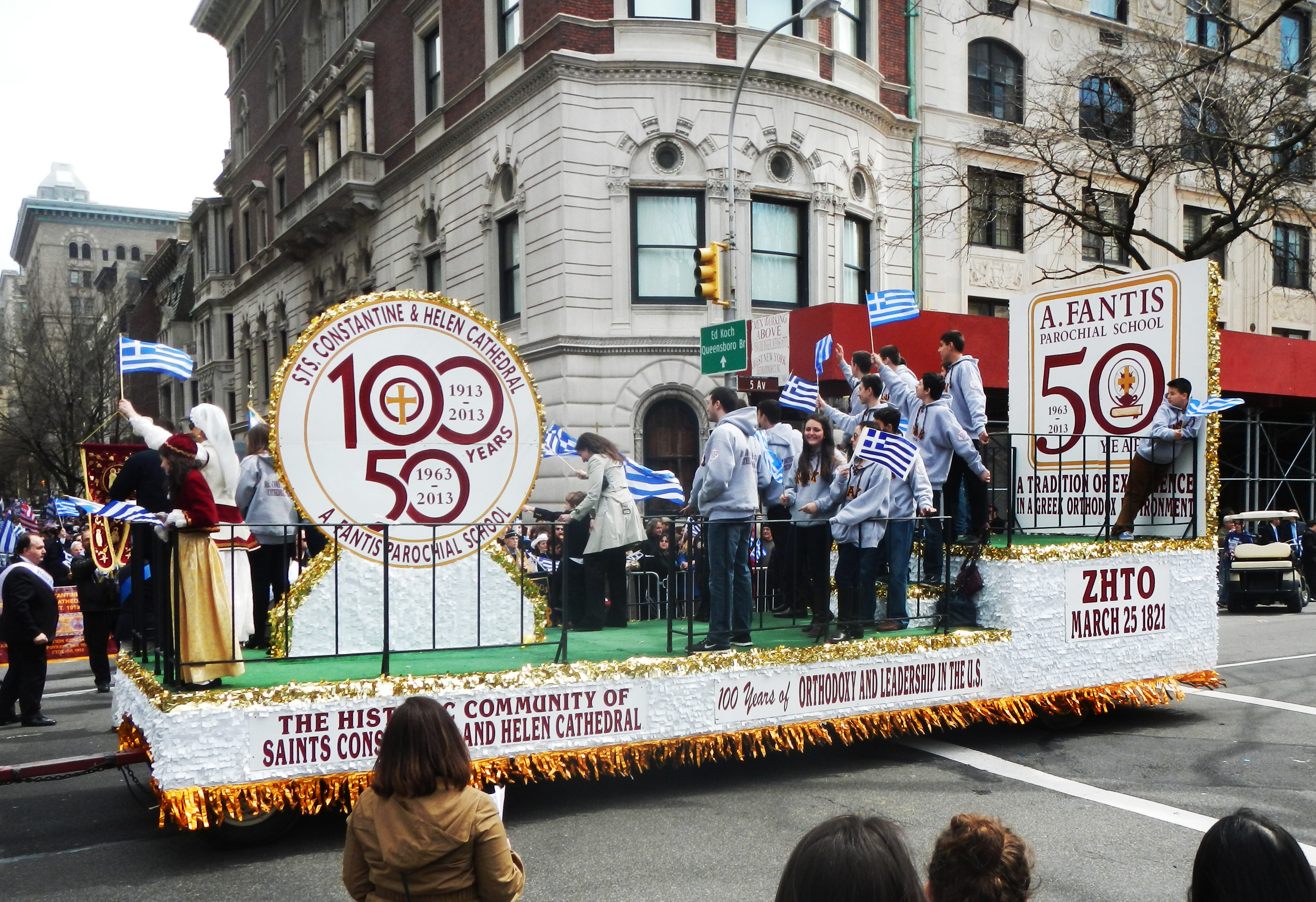
Greek parade at 57th Street, New York State

Greek flag

In 1938, the first Greek Independence Day Parade was held and has since become a in New York City annual event. The parade runs along 5th Avenue from 64th to 79th Streets and is sponsored by the Federation of Hellenic Societies of Greater New York.

In the 2024, parade Honorary Grand Marshals were Dionysios "Fredi" Beleri the elected Mayor of Himara, southern Albania (a historical region known as Northern Epirus with a native Greek population) and Mayor of Chios Dr. Ioannis M. Malafis. As part of the support, local diaspora Greeks Beleri was given the honor, he was absence in the parade because he is currently imprisoned by the Albanian authorities.

== See also ==
- Greeks in New York City
- Celebration of the Greek Revolution
