= Celebration of the Greek Revolution =

Public holiday in Greece on March 25

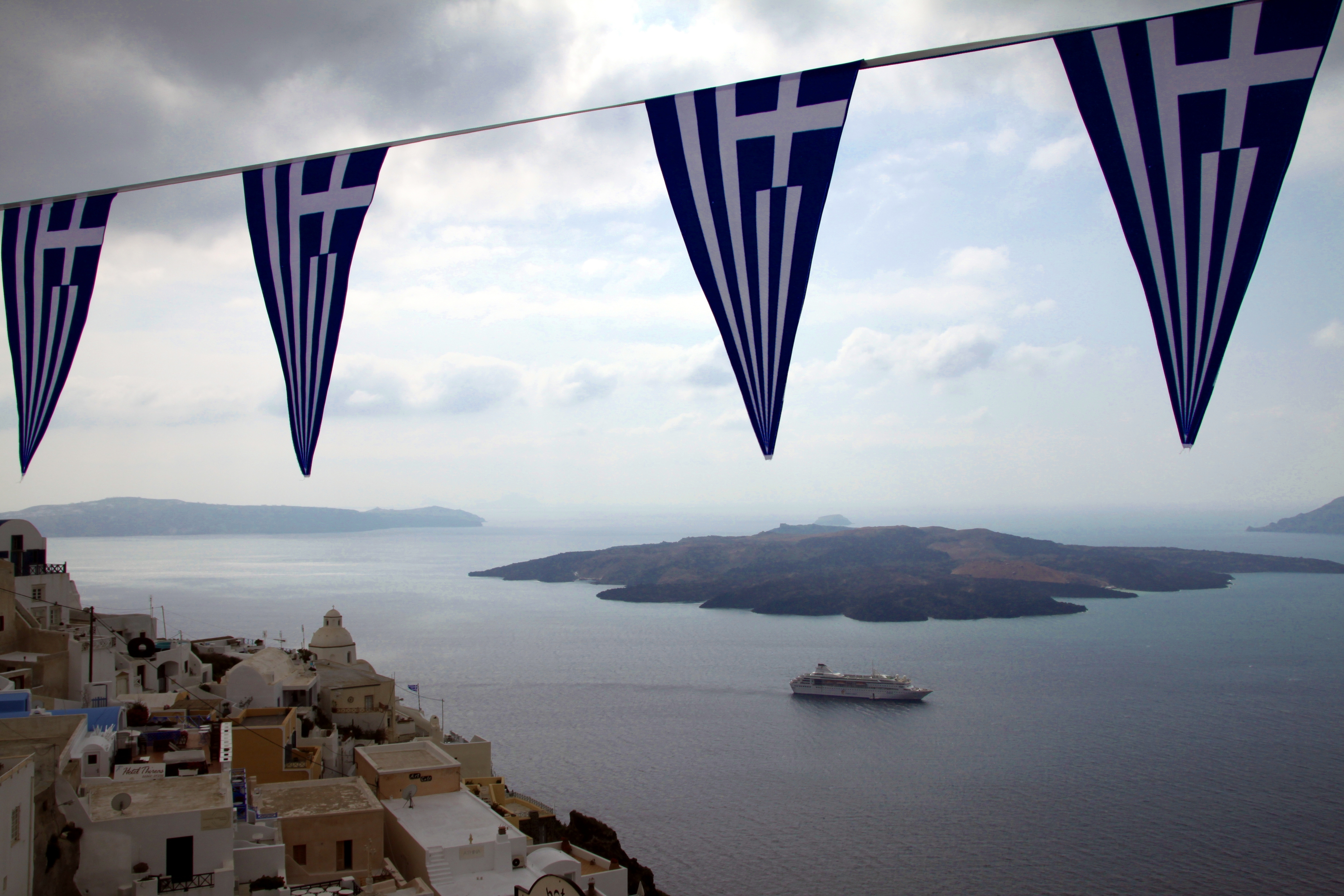
Flag decorations for 25 March in Santorini

The celebration of the Greek Revolution of 1821 (Greek: Εορτασμός της Ελληνικής Επανάστασης του 1821, romanized: Eortasmós tis Ellinikís Epanástasis tou 1821), less commonly known as Independence Day, takes place in Greece, Cyprus, and Greek diaspora centres on 25 March every year, coinciding with the Feast of the Annunciation.

The day is a public holiday in Greece and Cyprus. Usually celebrations include parades and other celebratory events on the day or day before. The largest event is the military parade in Athens on 25 March, while on the previous day, celebrations take place throughout the schools of the country. In other municipalities parades of military divisions, students, clubs, etc. are held, as well as church services.

More broadly, the holiday acknowledges the successful Greek War of Independence (1821–1829) fought to liberate and decolonise Greece from four centuries of Ottoman occupation. After nine years of war, Greece was finally recognised as an independent state under the London Protocol of February 1830. Further negotiations in 1832 led to the London Conference of 1832 and the Treaty of Constantinople (1832); these defined the final borders of the new state and recognised the king.

The holiday was established in 1838 with a Royal Decree by King Otto's government.

When expressing celebration of the day, it is common to say "Long live Greece!" (Greek: Zήτω η Ελλας!, romanized: Zíto i Ellas!)

== History ==
25 March, the feast day of the Annunciation, had been chosen as the day of the start of the Greek Revolution against the Ottoman Empire, by the leader of the Filiki Eteria Alexander Ypsilantis "as evangelising the political liberation of the hellenic nation". This date was considered a reference point since the early days of the Revolution, and even as the starting day of a new calendar, even in areas which had revolted earlier. Since 1823 at the latest it was considered in the Peloponnese as the starting day of the revolution.

In 1822, the provisional government headed in Corinth decided to celebrate the anniversary of the Revolution the same day as Easter (2 April, Julian Calendar). The celebrations took place in Corinth with a military procession, festive church services and cannon fire, as described by the German volunteer Striebeck, who was present.

According to the writer D. Photiadis and others, before 1838, 1 January was considered the national holiday, a date which was voted on by the First National Assembly at Epidaurus the first Greek "Constitution", or the "Provisional Regime". It is therefore believed that by changing the date "the national holiday was losing its political and revolutionary character and taking on a religious nature" with whatever that entailed concerning the assertions of democracy and a constitution. The historian Chr. Koulouri, who researched national holiday-type celebrations from 1834 and after, does not include in them 1 January, but instead six dates related to the royal family. The main celebration before the establishment of 25 March was 25 January, the anniversary of King Otto's landing in Nafplio (1833).

The leader of the Filiki Eteria who organised the revolution, Alexander Ypsilantis, kickstarted the operations in Iasi on 24 February 1821. However, the events there were characterised in the collective conscious and history as something isolated, something like a prologue to the Revolution. The complete failure of the movement in a non-Greek area, maybe also the disappointment of the Greeks about the delusion of Russian support propagated by the Filiki Eteria, were the main contributors to the distinction between the events in the Danubian Principalities and those in Greece. The State validated the prevailing attitude and chose 25 March as the national holiday.

According to certain views, the starting date of the Revolution is indeed 24 February, when the Greek revolution in Wallachia started with Alexander Ypsilantis' proclamation Fight for Faith and Fatherland. Since then and with other revolts which took place well before 25 March the Greek Revolution was spread throughout Ottoman Greece, until it reached the Peloponnese.

In Greece skirmishes had started before 25 March, as is recorded in the news which have been preserved in the "Correspondence of the Dutch Embassy in Patras: 1821", the Dutch government having been informed through its ambassador in Patras on 23 March that "since this year a latent dangerous situation has broken out" and that "the Greeks took up arms against the dynast".

The official declaration of the revolutionaries to foreign governments happened with the proclamation of the "Messenian Senate" on 25 March 1821. The 25th/3rd is considered the start of the Revolution in an 1823 judicial document of the Provisional Government of Greece, where the "Provincial Criterion of Tripoli" (a judicial body) mentions that "the rebellion followed on 25 March".

=== Institutionalisation ===
Panagiotis Soutsos was the first to suggest in 1834 the establishment of the celebration of the Greek Revolution on 25 March, mentioning that it was the day of the spread of the revolution throughout the Peloponnese and the rebirth of Greece, in a petition which Ioannis Kolettis submitted to Otto as a proposition of a law draft. Kolettis', the Foreign Minister, document, is dated 22 Jan./2 Febr. 1835 and suggests to the King to establish celebrations with panhellenic games similar to those of ancient Greece. His proposal is written in French with a German abstract. It mentions that "renowned Germanos" (celebre Germanos) proclaimed the Revolution on 17 March 1821 in Agia Lavra, and that the revolution spread throughout the Peloponnese on 25 March, which he considers the day of the start of a new era for Greece. He even says that there was a prophecy of the monks of Mega Spilaio that on this date the rebirth of Greece would take place, and that the Ottomans of the Peloponnese knew about it and every year on this date they took emergency security measures (Diamantis, p. 314). The celebrations proposed by Kolettis included competitions in the arts and sciences and in various sports. They would take place in Tripoli, Athens, Hydra and Mesologgi, alternating between the four each year, for a full cycle of four years, similarly to the ancient Olympic, Pythian, Isthmian and Nemean games. In 1836, 25 March was honoured together with Kalavryta and Germanos with a bronze medal which was minted for the occasion of King Otto's marriage to Amalia of Oldenburg. On it is the legendary scene of Germanos raising the flag and the cross and two armed fighters in an oath or saluting stance. It bears the inscription: "MY FATHER'S GOD AND I WILL EXALT HIM – KALAVRYTA 25 MAR. 1821" (το απόφθεγμα είναι από την Έξοδο, ιε', 3). The other side of the medal depicts Germanos.

The celebration "from then on forever" of the Revolution on 15 March was established in 1838 with Royal Decree 980 / 15(27)-3-1838 of the Otto government and specifically that of Georgios Glarakis, Secretary of State for Ecclesiastical, Public Education and Internal Matters. Glarakis was one of the main representatives of the Russian Party, the "Napists", which during this period was favoured by Otto. Otto was trying to boost his popularity by associating himself with the popular expressors of Orthodoxy, and this may be the reason for the religious nature of the decree and the establishment of the holiday. However, on the first celebration of the anniversary, in 1838, the only foreign ambassadors missing were those of Russia and Austria.

The first celebration took place in Athens which was attended by King Otto and Queen Amalia, political and military authorities and a mass of people. The Metropolitan Church of Athens was built on 15 December 1842 and was dedicated to the Annunciation in order to honour 25 March 1821.

In 1839, Amvrosios Frantzis mentions that 25 March was a day "clear and embedded in the heart of Peloponnesians as the starting day of the Greek revolution".

=== Later ===
After the official establishment of the holiday, and especially in 1841, there was an attempt by the anti-Otto opposition to expropriate the anniversary, with private celebrations where Korais' figure was especially celebrated. The holiday continued to be a matter of political and localist conflict; Prime Minister Kolettis' decision in 1846 and 1847 to hold an official ceremony on the grave of the Rumelian chieftain Georgios Karaiskakis in Phaleron caused major reactions, as it was considered as leading to identification of the Revolution with one individual.

== Celebrations in Greece and Cyprus ==
On March 25, schools in Greece and Cyprus close along with many businesses.

=== Parades ===
A common feature of Greek Independence day within Greece and Cyprus, are local school parades in many villages, towns, and cities, schoolchildren march in traditional Greek folk costumes and carry Greek flags. The largest celebration takes place In Athens where an annual military parade commemorates the event, attended by the president of the Hellenic Republic and other high ranking state officials, along with hundreds of civilian spectators, the Athens parade starts in the mid-morning, making its way from Vasilissis Sofias Avenue, past the Hellenic Parliament and the Academy of Athens on Panepistimiou Street. Participants of the parade include men and women from all branches of the Hellenic Armed Forces, and civil services such as the Hellenic Fire Service, and Hellenic Police.

Before the parade begins the president attends a wreath laying service at Syntagma Square, where the parade passes by every year, the service is held at the Tomb of the Unknown Soldier.

==== History of the parades ====
Until 1875 the army was lined across the route of the royal procession from the palace to the church and back. In 1875 for the first time the army paraded in front of the palace, a practice starting from the middle of the century in public holidays in France and the German states. The next year, even though there was no military parade because of rain, next to the army was lined also a university column. The earliest reference to a student parade dates back to 1899. Students had also lined during the celebration of 25 March in 1924, when the Republic was proclaimed. The next year scouts and students of military schools joined the military parade. In 1932 the schools of Athens paraded in front of officials in the Tomb of the Unknown Soldier together with the scouts, the "city guard" and the "nationalist organisations". Since 1936 the student parade, which took place in front of King George and Prime Minister Metaxas, had been institutionalised. During the period of the Metaxas dictatorship the parades of students and phalangists (members of EON) took on significant importance and became connected with the military parade. The practice of student parades continued during the post-Civil War era and after the metapolitefsi. Before 1980, universities also participated in the parade in Athens. In various smaller cities local university faculties also participate, like for example in Corfu and Patras.

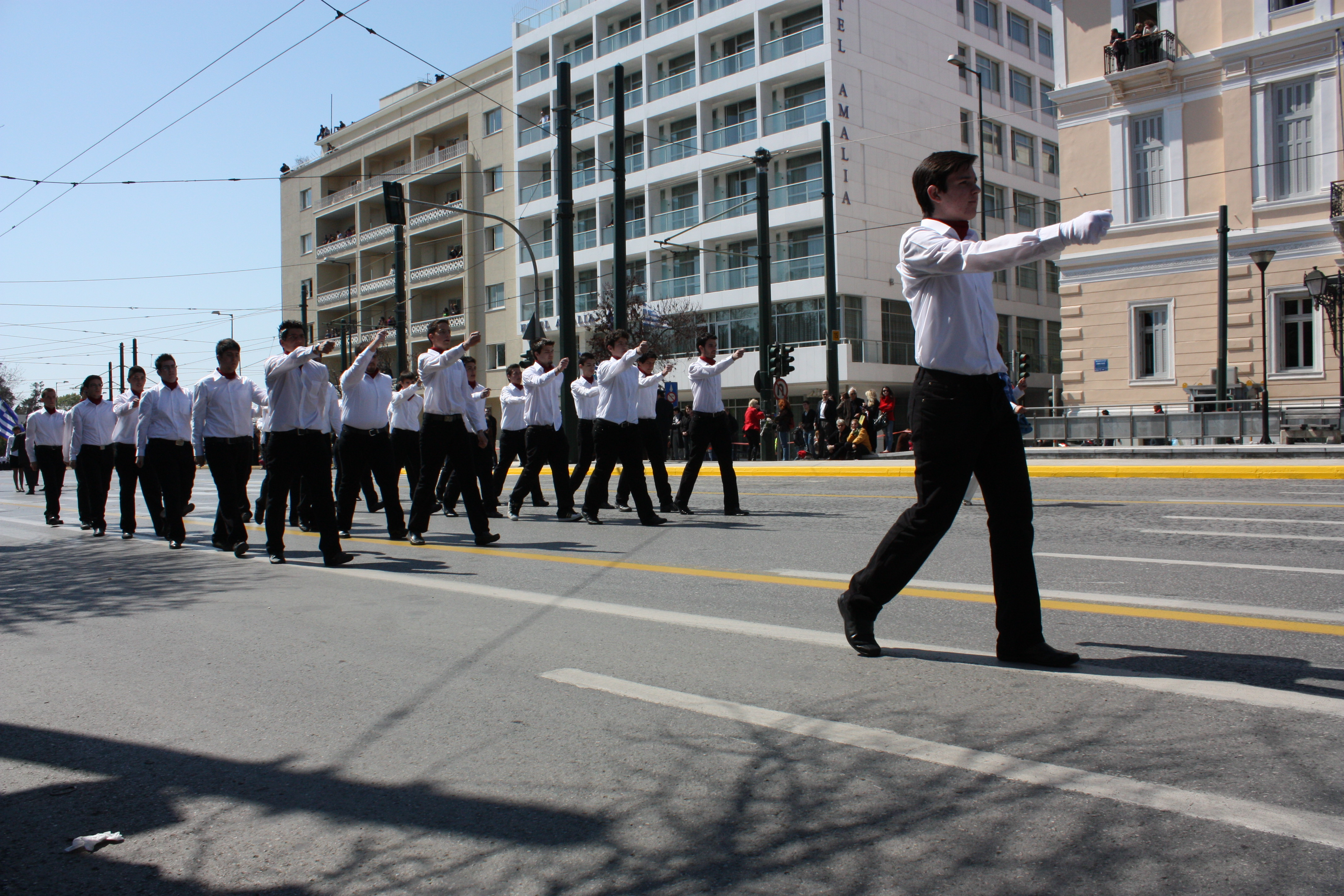
Male student parade on 24 March in Athens.

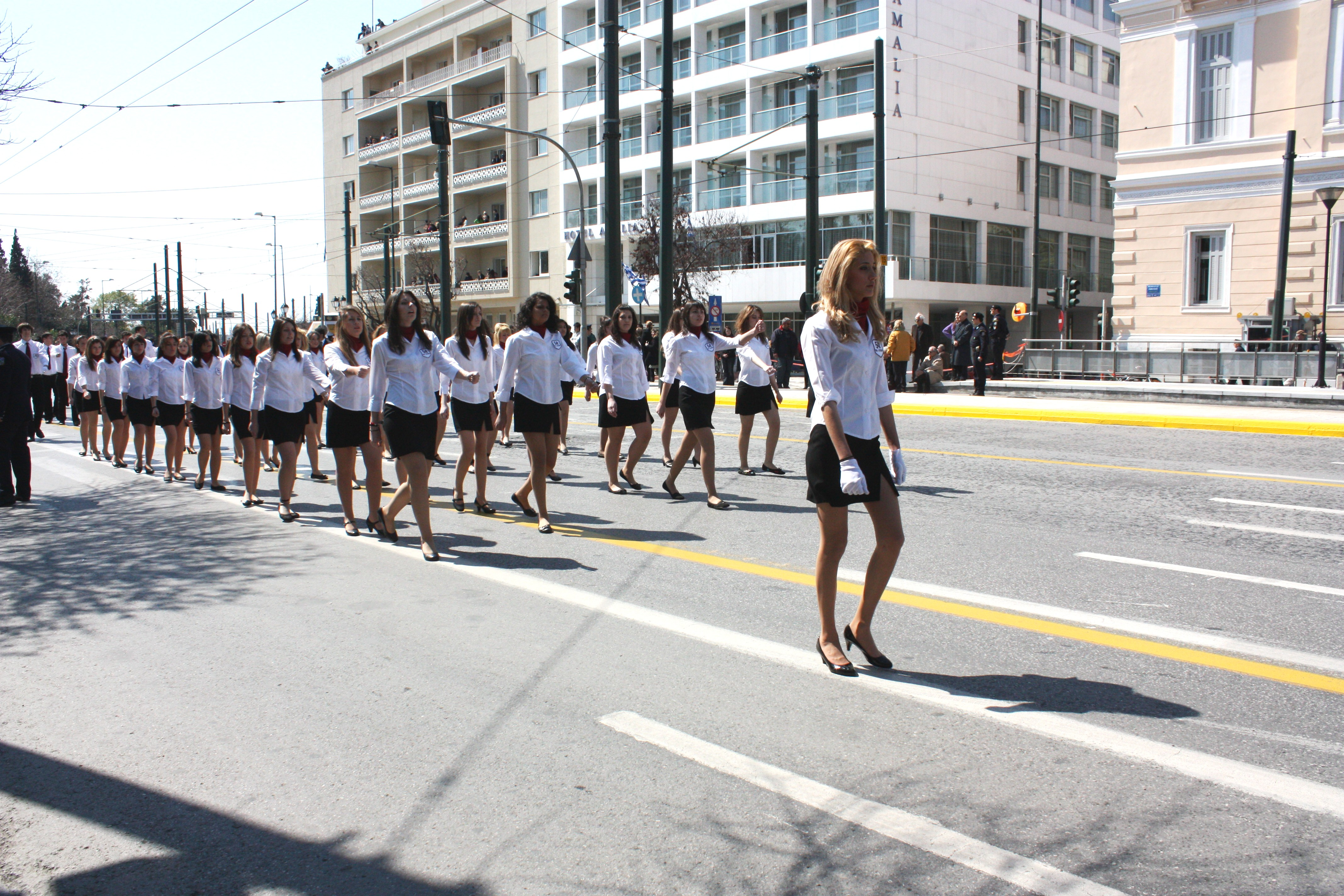
Female student parade on 24 March in Athens.

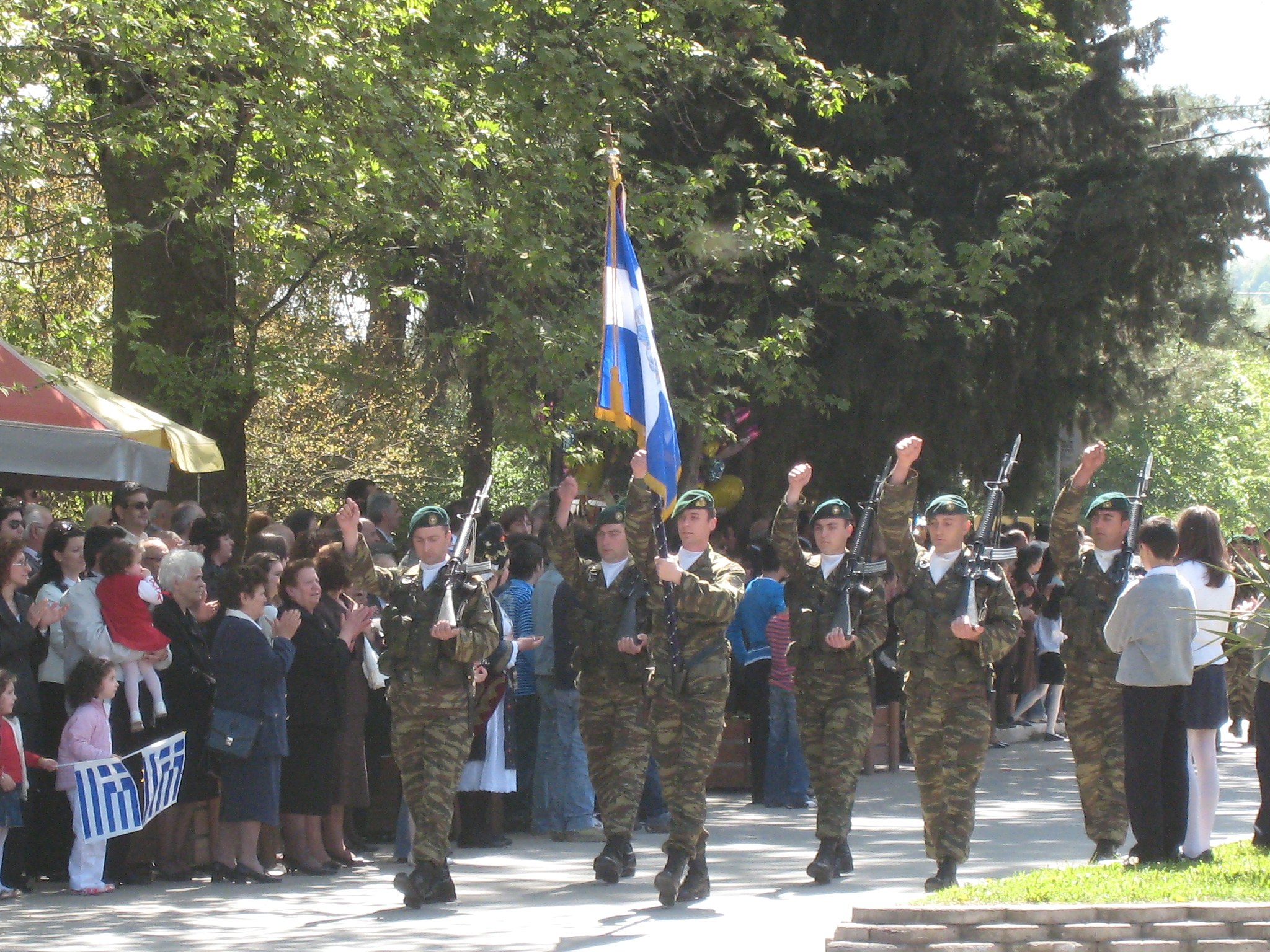
Military parade in Naousa on 15 April, in honour of the struggles during the revolution in 1822.

=== Celebration in schools ===
The Greek Revolution of 1825 is celebrated in schools on the last working day before 25 March. Preparations usually start one or two weeks before the day, with rehearsals supervised by the physical education teacher of the school. Performances include dancing, songs and poetry recitals.

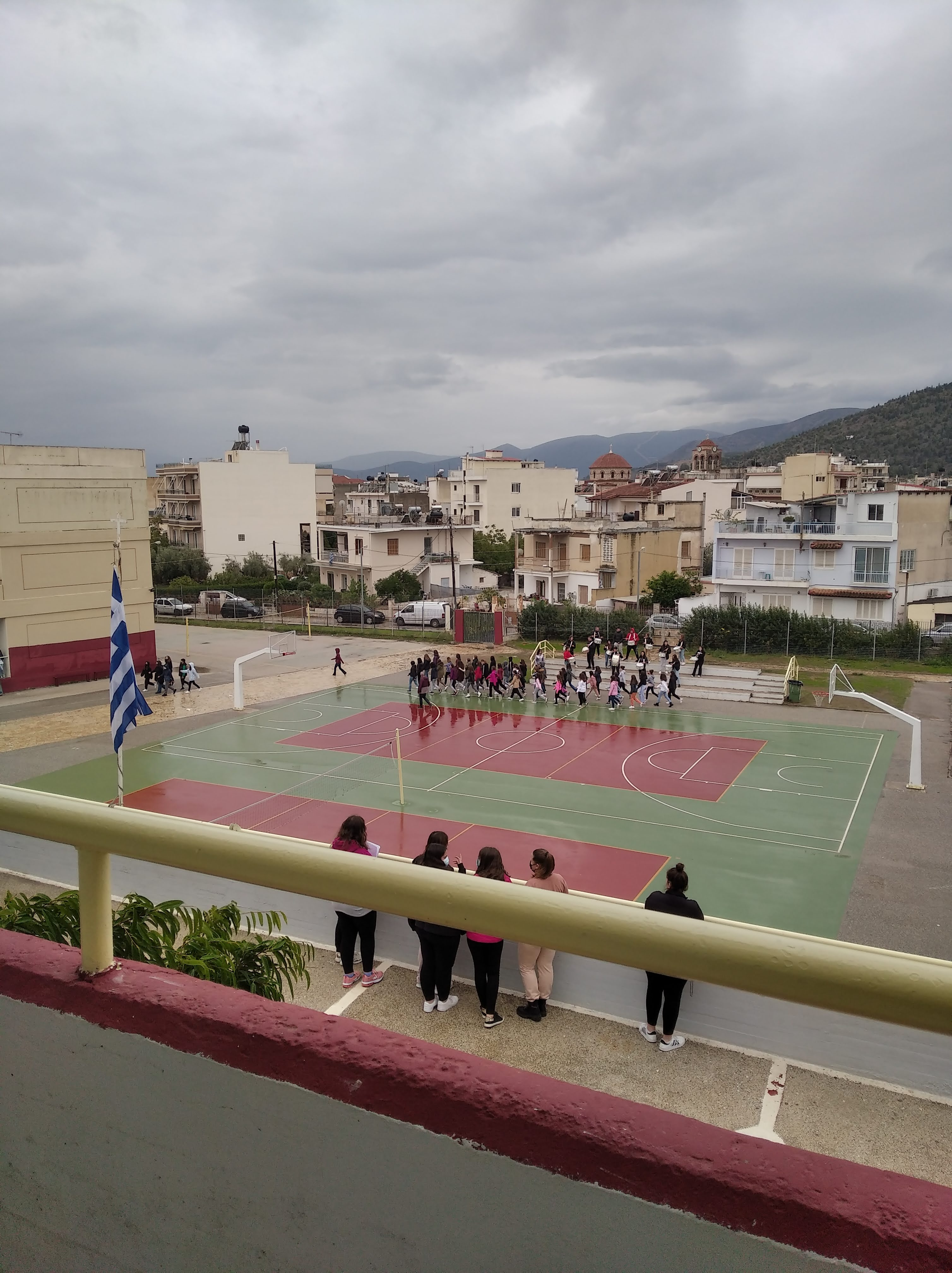
A rehearsal for the 28 October parade (similar to the 25 March parade) in Argos, 2021.

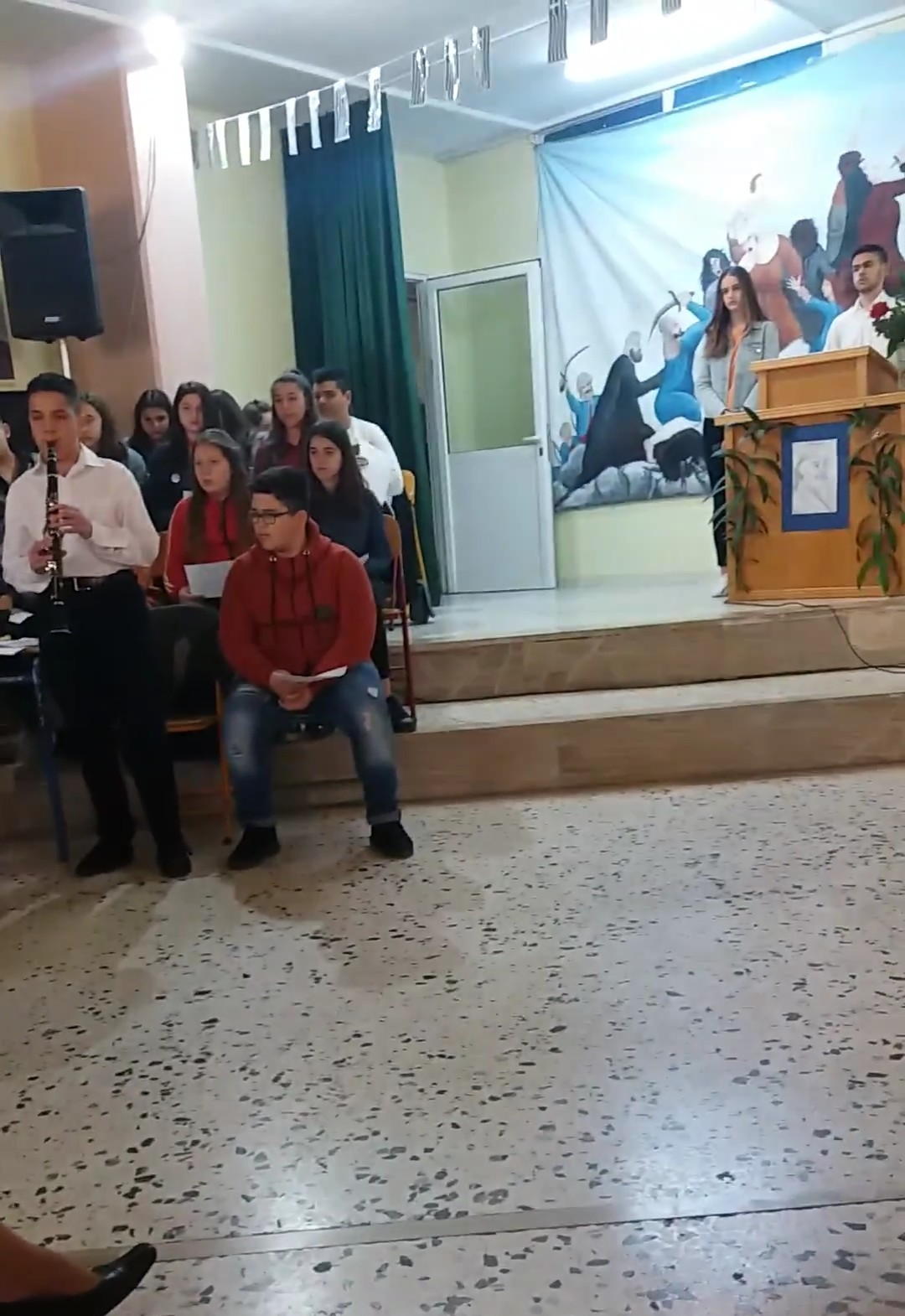
A school celebrates the 25 March.

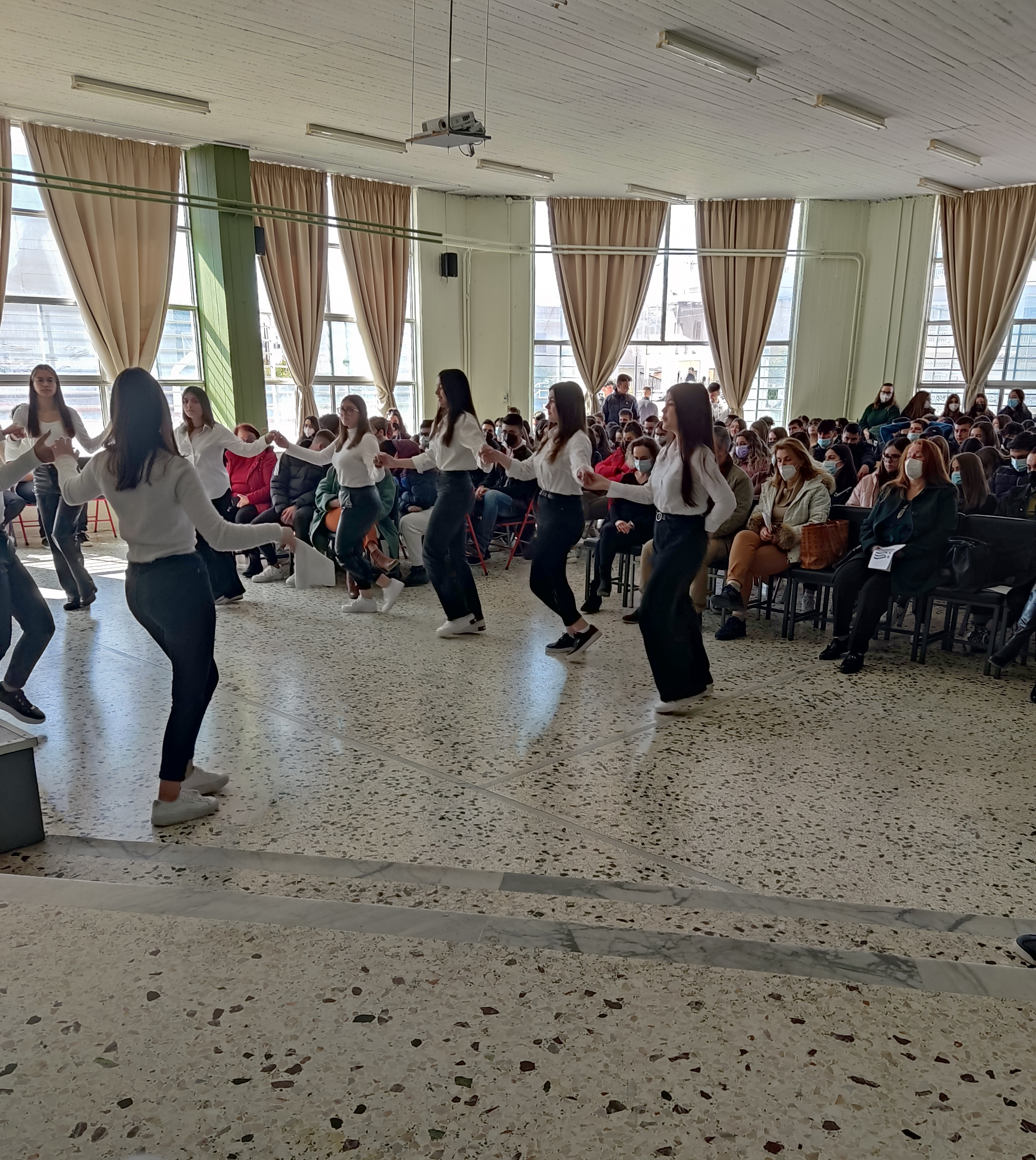
Celebrations include traditional dances.

=== Bicentennial celebrations ===
The Bicentennial of the Greek Revolution (Greek: Διακοσιετηρίδα της Ελληνικής Επανάστασης), also known as Greece 2021, was a year-long anniversary celebration held in 2021 in honour of the bicentenary of the beginning of the Greek War of Independence.

On 8 November 2019, Prime Minister Kyriakos Mitsotakis inaugurated the Greece 2021 Bicentenary Committee. A group of 31 Greeks and members of the Greek diaspora were appointed to the committee. Gianna Angelopoulos-Daskalaki, the former president of the organising committee for the 2004 Athens Olympic Games, was appointed to lead the committee. Its members included British historian Mark Mazower and Greek academic Helene Glykatzi-Ahrweiler.

Foreign dignitaries who attended the celebrations in Athens on 25 March included Charles, Prince of Wales, and Camilla, Duchess of Cornwall; Russian prime minister Mikhail Mishustin; French defence minister Florence Parly; and Cypriot president Nicos Anastasiades.

French president Emmanuel Macron had been scheduled to attend but cancelled his visit on 19 March after tighter restrictions were introduced in France in response to rising COVID-19 infections. France was represented by Parly instead. Russian president Vladimir Putin also did not attend, with Russia represented by Mishustin.

Prime Minister Mitsotakis hosted the visiting dignitaries at the newly renovated National Gallery.

==== International commemorations ====
Governments, municipalities, Greek diaspora organisations and philhellenic groups also organised commemorations outside Greece. On 24 and 25 March 2021, public buildings and landmarks in several countries were illuminated in the blue and white colours of the Greek flag.

In the United States, participating landmarks included San Francisco City Hall, the pylons of Los Angeles International Airport, the Zakim Bridge in Boston and the Pacific Wheel at Santa Monica Pier. In Canada, the CN Tower in Toronto and Niagara Falls were illuminated, while commemorations in Vancouver included a vehicle parade and the display of Greek flags around the city.

In Australia, the Greek flag was projected onto the Sydney Opera House and the National Museum of Australia in Canberra. Landmarks and civic buildings in Melbourne, Adelaide, Darwin and Perth were also illuminated in blue and white.

In South Africa, the Hellenic Federation of South Africa produced a 50-by-30-metre (164 ft × 98 ft) Greek flag for the commemorations. In Belgium, the Manneken Pis statue in Brussels was dressed in the uniform of an Evzone.

In Spain, the municipality of Alicante illuminated the fountain in the Plaza de los Luceros in blue and white, following a proposal by the Greek Community of Alicante.

Before the anniversary, the Greek newspaper Proto Thema reported that the Spanish government and municipal authorities had initially informed Greek diplomatic representatives that Greece would need to cover the electricity costs of any requested illumination.

== Outside Greece ==
Greek Independence Day is celebrated in many cities outside of Greece with large Greek diaspora communities. In the United States annual parades are held in cities like Chicago, and New York. An annual reception at the White House hosted by the president of the United States attended by many prominent Greek Americans has also been held since the tradition was first started by President Ronald Reagan in 1987. A Presidential proclamation is also issued celebrating the day. In Australia parades are held in cities including Melbourne and Sydney, in Canada Parades are held in Toronto, and Montreal.

== See also ==
- Greek war of independence
- Public holidays in Greece
- Greek Independence Day Parade (New York City)

== Sources ==
- Koulouri, Christina (2012). "Celebrating the nation: national anniversaries in Greek in the 19th century". Unseen views of history. Texts dedicated to Giannis Gianoulopoulos. Athens: Asini. pp. 181–210.
