= 2015 Greek bailout referendum =

- 5 July 2015
- Should the agreement plan submitted by the European Commission, the European Central Bank and the International Monetary Fund to the Eurogroup of 25 June 2015, and comprised of two parts which make up their joint proposal, be accepted? The first document is titled "Reforms For The Completion Of The Current Program And Beyond" and the second "Preliminary Debt Sustainability Analysis."
- Outcome: Tsipras government agrees to the bailout agreement with European authorities despite the referendum results Finance minister Yanis Varoufakis resigns

Results
| Choice | Votes | % |
|---|---|---|
| Yes | 2,245,537 | 38.69% |
| No | 3,558,450 | 61.31% |
| Valid votes | 5,803,987 | 94.20% |
| Invalid or blank votes | 357,153 | 5.80% |
| Total votes | 6,161,140 | 100.00% |
| Registered voters/turnout | 9,858,508 | 62.5% |
- Results by regional unit >50–55% No >55–60% No >60–65% No >65–70% No >70–75% No

A referendum to decide whether Greece should accept the bailout conditions in the country's government-debt crisis proposed jointly by the European Commission (EC), the International Monetary Fund (IMF) and the European Central Bank (ECB) on 25 June 2015 took place on 5 July 2015. The referendum was announced by Prime Minister Alexis Tsipras in the early morning of 27 June 2015 and ratified the following day by the Parliament and the President. It was the first referendum to be held since the republic referendum of 1974 and the only one in modern Greek history not to concern the form of government.

As a result of the referendum, the bailout conditions were rejected by a majority of over 61% to 39%, with the "No" vote winning in all of Greece's regions. The referendum results also forced the immediate resignation of New Democracy leader Antonis Samaras as party president because of the perceived negative result of the "Yes" choice, to which the conservative party and Samaras had committed themselves. Although winning the referendum, Finance Minister Yanis Varoufakis also resigned and was replaced on 6 July by Euclid Tsakalotos.

Despite the result of the referendum, the government of Tsipras reached an agreement on 13 July 2015 with the European authorities for a three-year-bailout with even harsher austerity conditions than the ones already rejected by voters. This represented a "drastic turnaround" for Prime Minister Tsipras' position, as he had been elected in an anti-austerity platform. Former Finance Minister Yanis Varoufakis characterised the harshness of the deal as a new Treaty of Versailles and "Greece's Terms of Surrender". In July and August, Tsipras was able to get the new austerity packages and the entire bailout agreement approved by the Parliament, but had to rely on the pro-European Union opposition parties as around 40 MPs of the major ruling party abstained or voted against the measures. This triggered the September 2015 snap election, where Tsipras was re-elected, albeit with an historical low turnout. The second Tsipras government was marked by an intense austerity policy in the context of the third bailout to Greece.

Greece officially exited from the bailout programs in August 2018 (three years after the referendum) and the Tsipras government announced some social cohesion measures such as increases in pensions and aid packages for low-income groups. The economy has also seen growth, albeit at a slow pace. However, these developments have not diminished criticism levelled at the Syriza government for its U-turn and the huge economic and social cost of austerity policies it imposed.

== Background ==
The referendum was announced by Tsipras in the early morning of 27 June 2015. No prior notice of the decision was given to the Eurogroup. In the early hours of 28 June 2015, Parliament voted on whether or not the government's proposed bailout referendum should be held, with 178 MPs (Syriza, ANEL and Golden Dawn) for, 120 MPs (all other parties) against and two MPs abstaining.

== Referendum question ==
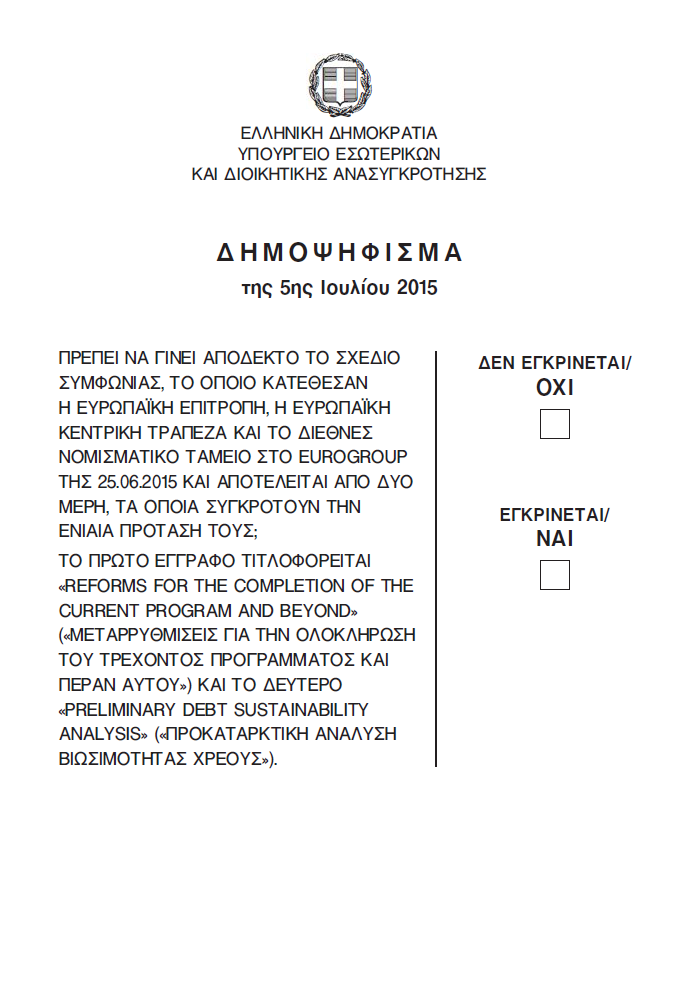
Ballot paper used in the referendum (ΟΧΙ = No, ΝΑΙ = Yes)

Voters were asked whether they approve of the proposal made to Greece by the Juncker Commission, the IMF and the ECB during the Eurogroup meeting on 25 June. This proposal with a list of 10 prior action items was published by the commission, but withdrawn when negotiations were abandoned shortly after.

The Greek government thus asked to vote on two previous documents, titled "Reforms For The Completion Of The Current Program And Beyond" and "Preliminary Debt Sustainability Analysis.". The possible answers were stated as "Not approved/No" and "Approved/Yes".

== Legality concerns ==
Evangelos Venizelos from PASOK party, as well as To Potami and New Democracy parties, said that the proposed referendum would be unconstitutional, as the constitution does not allow for referendums on fiscal matters. Article 44, section 2 provides for two referendum procedures, one for 'crucial national matters' (first clause) and a second for Bills passed by Parliament regulating important social matters, except for the fiscal ones' (second clause). The Syriza-led government argued the referendum was in accordance with the first clause, and therefore not unconstitutional.

The Athens Bar Association (DPS), which is the largest legal association in Greece, raised a range of concerns about whether the referendum law approved by the Hellenic Parliament and President of Greece was legal. They said the call of referendum and the referendum question itself, featured "significant problems on the validity and meaning of voting "yes"/"no" in that referendum", in a situation where the result of such referendum could have major importance for the future of Greece. Procedural guarantees for calling referendums provided for by law 4023/2011, as well as Constitutional requirements (Article 44, sections 2 and 3) regarding which issues could be put to a referendum, were assessed not to have been met.

On 1 July, Bloomberg reported they had found a translation mistake in the Greek version of the "Preliminary Debt Sustainability Analysis" part of the Institutions "unified proposal" being put to referendum. In this part there were three debt sustainability scenarios, and under the first two the original English document concludes that "this gross financing need metric points to no sustainability issues" (Bloomberg's wording for the conclusion was "that there are no sustainability issues") when the country's financing needs are taken into account, while the official Greek translation published to Greek voters and sent to reporters on 29 June, was missing the word "no", so that the Greek text reads "there are sustainability issues". This finding stressed the importance of the second concern raised by DPS, about the referendum putting "a pair of uncertified documents" to a vote, instead of what the law required, "a pair of certified translated documents approved by the initial issuer of the documents".

=== Court ruling ===
Greece's top administrative court, the Council of State, ruled on the legality of the referendum two days before it was due to be held against a claim that was submitted by private individuals and argued that the referendum could be violating the country's constitution by posing a question regarding "public finances". The court's decision was that the referendum was within the jurisdiction of the government and that the court had no authority on the issue, thus rejecting the claim.

== Reception ==
=== European Commission ===
The President of the European Commission, Jean-Claude Juncker, said on 29 June during a press conference on Greece that "the momentum [for finding an agreement] was destroyed unilaterally by the announcement of a referendum and by the decision to mount a 'no' campaign to reject this agreement".

The European Commission further objected to the timing of the referendum, stressing it should have been held to allow sufficient time before 30 June 2015 deadline when the "20 February 2015 offer ratified by other national parliaments"—in which Greece had been offered the prospect of completing and extending its existing bailout agreement by a new (yet to be mutually agreed) set of renegotiated terms—expired. The commission also objected to the approach of not choosing a referendum question reflecting the entire dimensions of the comprehensive bailout offer, which was not only about implementation of a "reform programme", but also included a €35bn investment package which it said would spur job creation along with economic growth, and included a guarantee for debt relief according to a renewal of the "November 2012 debt relief statement". This would ensure—conditional on the completion of the second bailout programme under its new renegotiated terms—automatic debt relief, to the extent that the Greek debt-to-GDP ratio would be reduced to levels below 124% in 2020 and 110% in 2022.

The European Commission also found it strange and inappropriate, that the Greek government asked for voters' opinion on the "Institution's 25 June compromise proposal" rather than the latest "Institution's 26 June compromise proposal". It said the latest "26 June compromise proposal" differed from the "25 June version" on several points (meeting objections tabled by the Greek government), of which one of the most significant was that the VAT rate for hotels had been reduced from 23% to 13%.

The European Commission claimed that neither of the Institution's proposals, contrary to claims by the Greek government, had contained "excessive austerity", public wage cuts or pension cuts. Instead they had lowered their demand for a public budget primary surplus from the previously required 4.5%—now to be 1% in 2015 followed by a gradual increase to a level of 3.5% for 2018 and beyond—saving Greece from implementing €12bn of extra austerity measures. Their request for a "wage reform", it said, was about conducting an ILO approved review and update of the current collective bargaining rights in the private sector (not removal of collective bargaining rights)—and implementation of a new approved wage scheme in which public workers were paid in future according to qualifications and performance (instead of clientele deals). Their "pension reform", it said, was calling for the cancellation of incentives for early retirement, along with moving to a system in which all people in Greece received pensions on the same terms (not treating some sectors more beneficially than others).

The claim by Juncker that there were no pension cuts in the proposal raised eyebrows, with Financial Times journalist Peter Spiegel tweeting that it was "simply not true".

Other important elements of the proposals, the European Commission said, were: to implement a more efficient and independent Tax Collection Authority, opening up closed professions to competition (i.e. so that the Greek price for electricity—which is currently the most expensive in EU—would decline), and to implement a string of measures to ensure more social fairness (guaranteed minimum income scheme, making tax payments more proportionate to income, targeting extra saving cuts in public spending on areas with no adverse impact for average citizens—i.e. increased defense cuts, removing socially unjust favorable tax treatments of ship-owners, fighting corruption in which the focus should be "big fish" rather than "ordinary people", and safeguarding a lasting social fairness by supporting more transparency and efficiency in public administration—in particularly through establishment of a new politically independent tax administration).

Further, the European Commission signaled that the referendum question, to which they would recommend a "Yes", from its viewpoint should be understood as whether or not Greece wanted to remain part of Europe and the Eurozone, which at the present state included acceptance of receiving conditional bailout help on a set of mutually negotiated and agreed terms. The Commission claimed the biggest impediment to jobs, growth and investment at the moment in Greece, was not the contents of the Institution's bailout proposals, but instead a paralyzing uncertainty caused by the Greek government's decision to cut itself off from continued bailout support and a moratorium on implementing structural reforms. According to the commission, this uncertainty and standstill could only be removed if Greece at the negotiating table agreed on one of the latest compromise proposals which the Institutions had tabled after accommodating a range of objections and requests tabled by the Greek government. They claimed the confidence effect of voting "Yes" to the settlement of such a deal, the predictability it would bring, together with the injection of liquidity into the economy from disbursements, would restore job creation and growth to the benefit of Greece.

=== Council of Europe ===
The Council of Europe stated that the Greek referendum does not meet European standards, as voters were not given a two-week period to make up their minds, as non-binding guidelines recommend. Due to the hasty schedule, the Council of Europe was not able to send election observers and the Greek government had not requested them either. However the head of the Greek delegation and vice president of the council's parliamentary assembly, Dimitris Vitsas, denied that there was any decision made by the Council of Europe and said that it was only a personal opinion expressed by the council's general secretary, Thorbjørn Jagland, with Tiny Kox, the head of the Left wing in the council's assembly supporting the same view and asking the general secretary to clarify his previous announcement.

=== United Nations independent experts ===
The United Nations Independent Expert on the Promotion of a Democratic and Equitable International Order and on human rights and international law, Alfred de Zayas and Virginia Dandan respectively, welcomed the Greek referendum and called for international solidarity, while expressing disappointment that the IMF and the EU have failed to reach a non-austerity based solution yet, and supporting that no treaty or loan agreement can force a country to violate the civil, cultural, economic, political and social rights of its population, nor can a loan agreement negate the sovereignty of a State.

== Campaigns ==
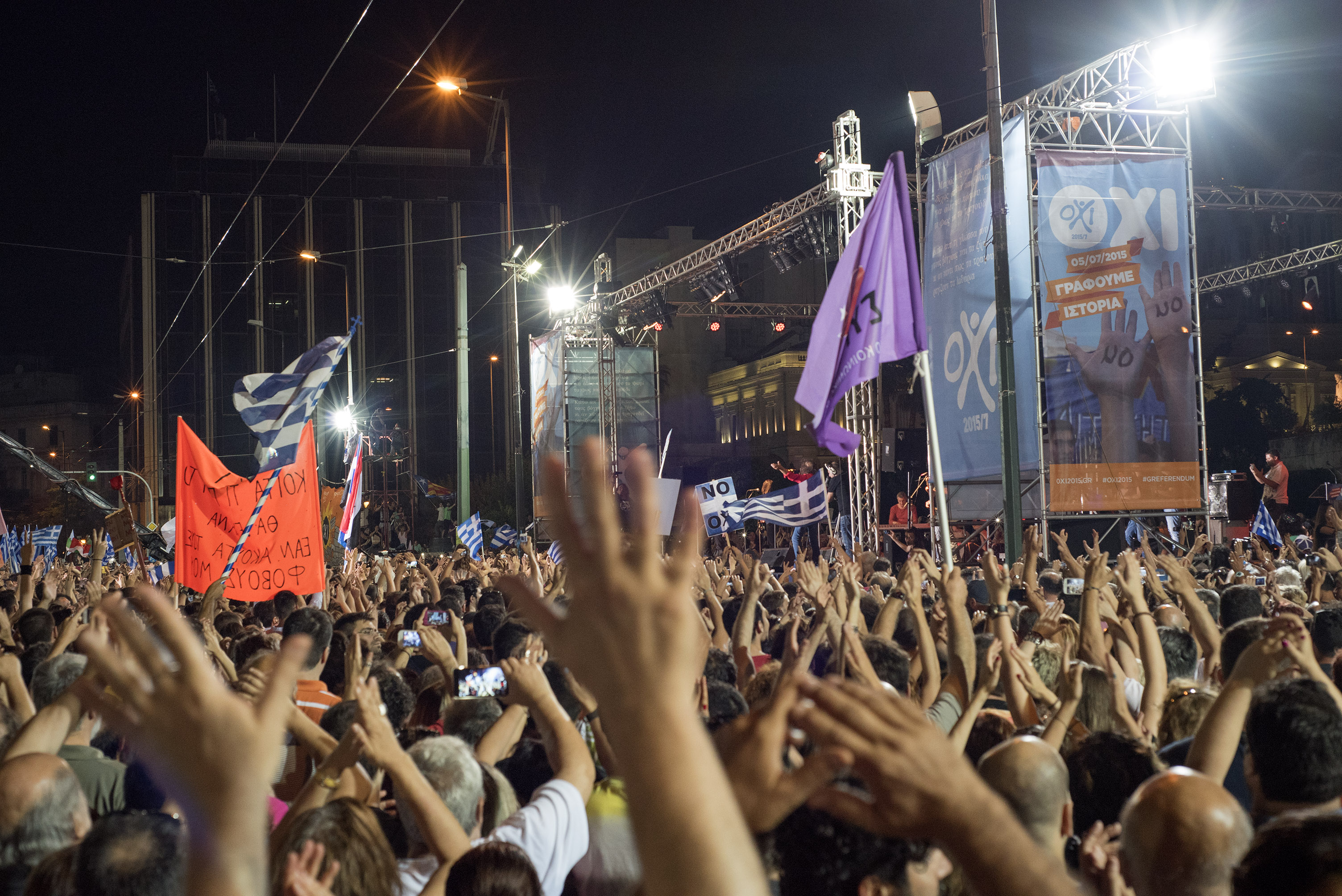
3 July 2015: Demonstration for voting NO in front of the Greek parliament, Syntagma Square, Athens.

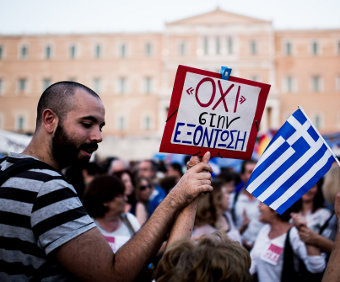
A "No" campaigner outside the Greek parliament building on 29 June 2015, holding a sign reading ΟΧΙ ΣΤΗΝ ΕΞΟΝΤΩΣΗ ("no to annihilation").

=== Positions on implications of the referendum ===
There has been substantial disagreement between campaigns on the implications of the referendum, and the public has interpreted it in a variety of ways. Tsipras has argued that a "No" vote would represent a rejection of the austerity terms demanded by the creditors, and strengthen the Greek negotiating position. Tsipras declared "On Sunday, we are not simply deciding to remain in Europe – we are deciding to live with dignity in Europe". Tsipras has repeatedly rejected Greek and international warnings that a "No" vote would be perceived by Greek's main creditors as a "No" to reforms in Greece, and a "No" to remaining in the Eurozone. Advocates of a "Yes" vote, among them a grassroot movement entitled Menoume Europi (Stay in Europe) have cast the referendum as a decision on Greece remaining in the eurozone, and perhaps even the European Union.

Many international leaders as well as mainstream economists and media warned that if the "No" vote leads to a failure to secure continued bailout support for Greece in due time, this would likely lead to a broader Greek sovereign default, a haircut on Greek bank deposits, a collapse of the banking sector, followed by an aggravated depression of the Greek economy, and a Greek exit from the euro area. A new local currency to replace the euro would be strongly devalued, which would decrease the purchasing power for Greeks and lead to inflation.

Eurogroup president Jeroen Dijsselbloem said that "in case of a 'No', Greece's (financial) situation will become exceptionally difficult... The economic problems will be even bigger and an aid programme more difficult to implement". European Commission head Jean-Claude Juncker said Greece's negotiating position would be "dramatically weakened" if a 'No' won. Other European leaders have also criticized the Greek government's representation of the referendum options, with EU leaders saying that they would see a "No" vote as a rejection of Europe.

Public opinion strongly favours keeping the euro. Of all the political parties which won seats in the parliamentary election in May, only the Communist KKE expressed support for leaving the euro, and indeed for leaving the European Union.

A majority of European leaders, and the US President Obama have expressed the opinion that Greece should remain in the monetary union. An opposite view comes from the UK Prime Minister David Cameron who mentioned, according to a leaked note, that it "might be better" for Greece to leave the euro in order to sort its economy out, even though Cameron conceded that there were major risks in that, too.

=== Greek organisations ===
Reception by professional/societal associations in Greece:

- Technical Chamber of Greece (TCG): Had called a steering committee meeting for approval of a "Yes" recommendation statement, but had to abort their meeting when evidently a group of radical Syriza supporters (not members of the organisation) had hijacked their meeting. The TCG president said: "It is assumed that the referendum is paramount democratic choice of the people. But how is democracy strengthened when people, who obviously support the opinion of SYRIZA, come and threaten our Steering Committee not to make a decision to communicate the opinion of our association in important matters?"
- Athens Bar Association (DPS): DPS recommend a "Yes" vote to stay in Europe. The DPS statement said: "If the referendum ultimately, as has been said and implied, is really about "Yes" or "No" to the European Union, then the answer can not be other than "Yes". Yes to our creative participation in the EU."
- Panhellenic Federation of Teaching and Research Staff (POSDEP): Recommended a "Yes" vote.
- The Central Union of Greek Municipalities (KEDE): Recommended a "Yes" vote.
- Greece Regions Union: Recommended a "Yes" vote.

=== Positions on the vote itself (Yes/No) ===
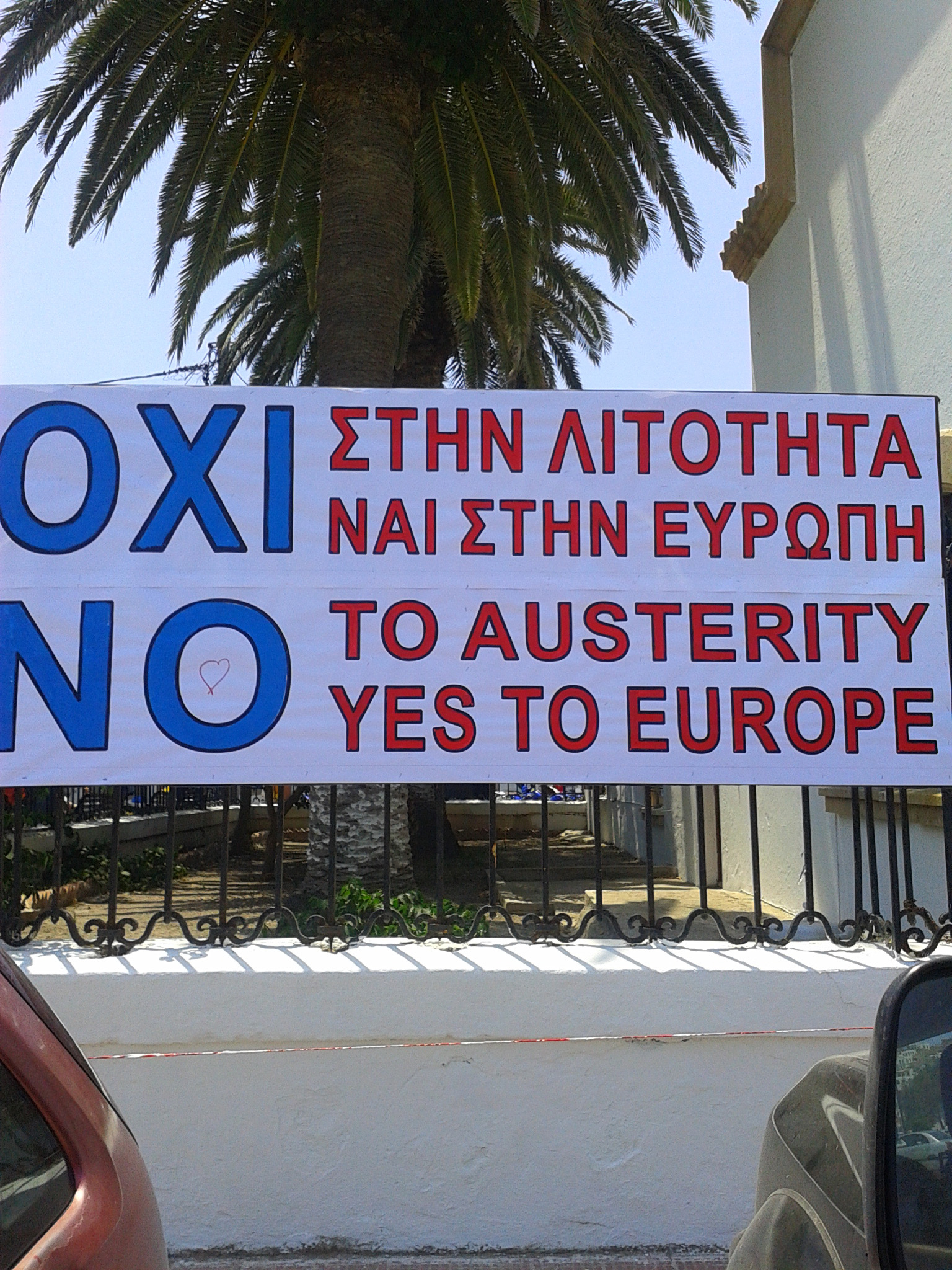
Banner in Patmos

In his initial address, when prime minister Tsipras of the ruling Syriza party announced the plebiscite on 5 July, he recommended a "No" vote to the Greek people. Most other Syriza members also supported a "No" vote.

ANEL, the other ruling party in coalition with Syriza, announced that they were campaigning for a "No" vote. The far-right Golden Dawn party, not being in the government, also called for a "No" vote.

=== Political parties ===
Parties position on the 2015 Greek bailout referendum
| Choice | Party | | Leader | Political orientation |
|---|---|---|---|---|
| Yes | ND | New Democracy | Antonis Samaras | Centre-right |
| Yes | PASOK | Panhellenic Socialist Movement | Fofi Gennimata | Centre-left |
| Yes | To Potami | To Potami | Stavros Theodorakis | Centrism |
| No | SYRIZA | Coalition of the Radical Left | Alexis Tsipras | Left-wing |
| No | ANEL | Independent Greeks | Panos Kammenos | Right-wing |
| No | XA | Golden Dawn | Nikolaos Michaloliakos | Far-right |
| – Write-in | KKE | Communist Party of Greece | Dimitris Koutsoumpas | Far-Left |

KKE declared it was against both of the latest two versions of the cash-for-reform counter proposals being submitted to the negotiation table between Greece and its public creditors (the counter proposal of the Greek government, and the latest compromise counter proposal of the institutions), and said that it would try to change the question of the referendum, so that people can vote not only against the latest compromise counter-proposal of the Institutions but also against the latest counter-proposal of the Greek government.

=== Newspapers ===
| Choice | Newspapers | Political and cultural orientation |
|---|---|---|
| Yes | Kathimerini | Conservatism |
| Yes | Ethnos | Centrism |
| Yes | Vradyni | Conservatism |
| Yes | Ta Nea/To Vima | Social liberalism |
| Yes | Eleftheros Typos | Conservatism |
| Yes | Makedonia | Centrism |
| Yes | Proto Thema | Conservatism |
| No | Efimerida ton Syntakton | Democratic socialism |
| No | Prin | Anti-capitalism |
| No | Kontra news | Left-wing populism |
| No | I Avgi | Democratic socialism |
| Neutral/Undeclared | Real News | Centrism |
| Neutral/Undeclared | Dimokratia | Right-wing populism |
| Neutral/Undeclared | Rizospastis | Communism |

Keynesian economists like James K. Galbraith and Thomas Piketty, along with Nobel prize in Economics recipients Paul Krugman and Joseph Stiglitz, individually expressed their support for the "No" vote on the referendum, arguing that the current austerity programme is a bad option from an economic point of view.

== Opinion polls ==
According to opinion polls, since the imposition of capital controls in Greece as a result of the ECB's decision not to enlarge its Emergency Liquidity Assistance programme in Greece, there was a trend from a clear No-vote majority to a head-to-head race, or even a slight advantage for the Yes-vote, to accept the proposed bailout terms (as of 3 July 2015).

Poll results listed in the table below are in reverse chronological order and use the date the survey's fieldwork was done, as opposed to the date of publication. If that date is unknown, the date of publication is given. The highest percentage figure in each polling survey is displayed in bold, and the background shaded in the leading option's colour. In the instance of a tie no figure is shaded.

=== After the referendum announcement ===
Between the options of YES and NO on the institutions proposal, which one would you choose?
| Date | Polling Firm/Source | Total | | | | Considering only Yes/No vote | | |
| Date | Polling Firm/Source | Yes | No | Don't know/ None | Lead | Yes | No | Lead |
|---|---|---|---|---|---|---|---|---|
| **5 Jul 2015** | **Referendum** | **38.7** | **61.3** | **—N/a** | **22.6** | **38.7** | **61.3** | **22.6** |
| 5 Jul | MRB | | | | | 48.5 | **51.5** | 3.0 |
| 5 Jul | Marc | | | | | 48.0 | **52.0** | 4.0 |
| 5 Jul | Metron Analysis | 46.0 | **49.0** | 5.0 | 3.0 | 48.0 | **52.0** | 4.0 |
| 4–5 Jul | GPO | 46.0 | **48.5** | 5.5 | 2.5 | 48.5 | **51.5** | 3.0 |
| 4 Jul | Metron Analysis | 46.0 | **50.0** | 4.0 | 4.0 | 48.0 | **52.0** | 4.0 |
| 3 Jul | Metron Analysis | 44.0 | **48.0** | 8.0 | 4.0 | 48.0 | **52.0** | 4.0 |
| 2–3 Jul | Alco | 41.9 | **42.7** | 15.4 | 0.8 | 49.5 | **50.5** | 1.0 |
| 2–3 Jul | Metron Analysis | 46.0 | **47.0** | 7.0 | 1.0 | 49.5 | **50.5** | 1.0 |
| 1–3 Jul | GPO | **44.1** | 43.7 | 12.2 | 0.4 | **50.2** | 49.8 | 0.4 |
| 30 Jun–3 Jul | Ipsos | **44.0** | 43.0 | 13.0 | 1.0 | **50.5** | 49.5 | 1.0 |
| 2 Jul | Metron Analysis | **49.0** | 46.0 | 5.0 | 3.0 | **51.5** | 48.5 | 3.0 |
| 2 Jul | PAMAK | 42.5 | **43.0** | 14.5 | 0.5 | 49.5 | **50.5** | 1.0 |
| 1–2 Jul | Alco | **41.7** | 41.1 | 17.2 | 0.6 | **50.4** | 49.6 | 0.8 |
| 1–2 Jul | Metron Analysis | **47.0** | 46.0 | 7.0 | 1.0 | **50.5** | 49.5 | 1.0 |
| 30 Jun–2 Jul | Public Issue | 42.5 | **43.0** | 14.5 | 0.5 | 49.5 | **50.5** | 1.0 |
| 1 Jul | Metron Analysis | 45.0 | **46.0** | 9.0 | 1.0 | 49.5 | **50.5** | 1.0 |
| 1 Jul | PAMAK | 44.0 | **45.0** | 11.0 | 1.0 | 49.5 | **50.5** | 1.0 |
| 30 Jun–1 Jul | Metron Analysis | 44.0 | **47.0** | 9.0 | 3.0 | 48.5 | **51.5** | 3.0 |
| 30 Jun–1 Jul | Alco | **41.5** | 40.2 | 18.3 | 1.3 | **50.8** | 49.2 | 1.6 |
| 30 Jun | Metron Analysis | 43.0 | **48.0** | 9.0 | 5.0 | 47.5 | **52.5** | 5.0 |
| 30 Jun | PAMAK | 40.5 | **44.0** | 15.5 | 3.5 | 48.0 | **52.0** | 4.0 |
| 29–30 Jun | Alco | 38.4 | **46.2** | 15.4 | 7.8 | 45.4 | **54.6** | 9.2 |
| 29–30 Jun | Metron Analysis | 42.0 | **50.0** | 8.0 | 8.0 | 45.5 | **54.5** | 9.0 |
| 29–30 Jun | ToThePoint | 37.0 | **40.2** | 22.8 | 3.2 | 47.9 | **52.1** | 4.2 |

| 28–30 Jun | ProRata | 33.0 | **54.0** | 13.0 | 21.0 | 38.0 | **62.0** | 24.0 |
| **After** bank shutdown | | 37.0 | **46.0** | 17.0 | 9.0 | 44.5 | **55.5** | 11.0 |
| **Before** bank shutdown | | 30.0 | **57.0** | 13.0 | 27.0 | 34.5 | **65.5** | 31.0 |

| 29 Jun | Metron Analysis | 41.0 | 51.0 | 8.0 | 10.0 | 44.5 | 55.5 | 11.0 |
| 29 Jun | PAMAK | 37.5 | 47.0 | 15.5 | 9.5 | 44.5 | 55.5 | 11.0 |
| 28–29 Jun | Metron Analysis | 37.0 | 53.0 | 10.0 | 16.0 | 41.0 | 59.0 | 18.0 |
| 28 Jun | Metron Analysis | 33.0 | 55.0 | 12.0 | 20.0 | 37.5 | 62.5 | 25.0 |
| 28 Jun | PAMAK | 31.0 | 54.0 | 15.0 | 23.0 | 36.5 | 63.5 | 27.0 |
| 27 Jun | PAMAK | 26.5 | 52.0 | 21.5 | 25.5 | 34.0 | 66.0 | 32.0 |

Note: This section only covers confirmed polls conducted since the announcement of the referendum. Polls not confirmed by their respective pollsters are not shown in the table.

=== Before the referendum announcement ===
Two opinion polls were conducted shortly before the announcement of the referendum on 27 June, and prior to the referendum question being made public. The first asked how people would vote if a debt-deal were put to a referendum, and the second whether people supported reaching an agreement with the creditor institutions or not. Both found support for a deal in principle.

== Results ==
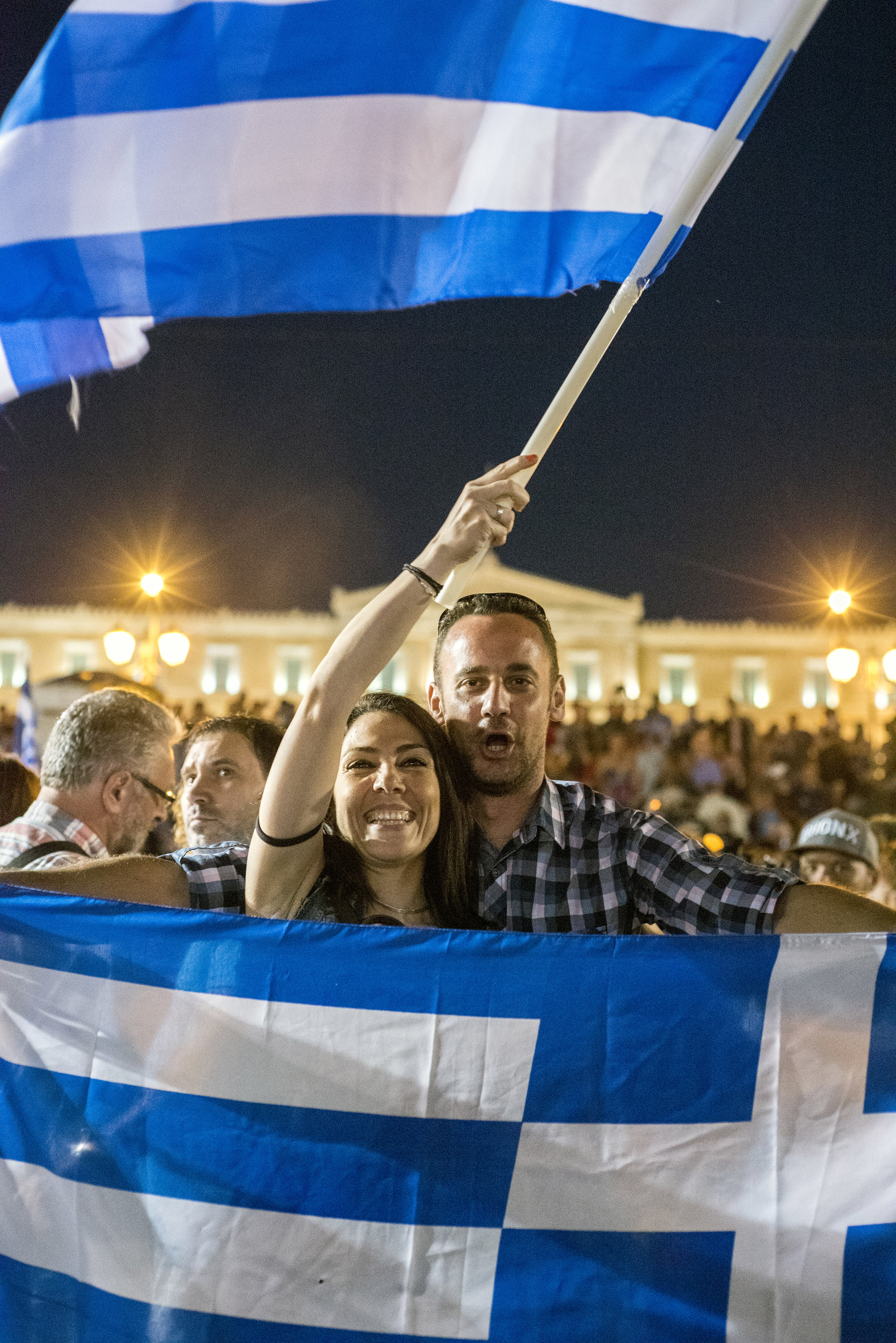
Celebrations after the results were settled, Syntagma Square, Athens

The "no" vote won in all the regions of Greece, as well as in all the Greek constituencies. The highest share of "no" votes was in Crete, particularly in the constituencies of Heraklion and Chania. The highest share of "YES" (ΝΑΙ in Greek) votes was in the Peloponnese region – most notably in the Laconia constituency – although the number of "yes" votes were outnumbered by "no" votes.

| Choice | Votes | % |
|---|---|---|
| For | 2,245,537 | 38.69 |
| Against | 3,558,450 | 61.31 |
| Total | 5,803,987 | 100.00 |
| Valid votes | 5,803,987 | 94.20 |
| Invalid/blank votes | 357,153 | 5.80 |
| Total votes | 6,161,140 | 100.00 |
| Registered voters/turnout | 9,858,508 | 62.50 |
Source: Ministry of Interior

=== By region ===
| Constituency | Region | Against (%) | For (%) |
|---|---|---|---|
| Achaea | Western Greece | 68.22 | 31.78 |
| Aetolia-Akarnania | Western Greece | 60.90 | 39.10 |
| Argolida | Peloponnese | 57.65 | 42.35 |
| Arkadia | Peloponnese | 56.43 | 43.57 |
| Arta | Epirus | 59.97 | 40.03 |
| Athens A | Attica | 53.21 | 46.79 |
| Athens B | Attica | 58.06 | 41.94 |
| Attica | Attica | 63.69 | 36.31 |
| Boeotia | Central Greece | 67.43 | 32.57 |
| Cephalonia | Ionian Islands | 64.57 | 35.43 |
| Chalkidiki | Central Macedonia | 59.15 | 40.85 |
| Chania | Crete | 73.77 | 26.23 |
| Chios | North Aegean | 53.84 | 46.16 |
| Corfu | Ionian Islands | 71.25 | 28.75 |
| Corinthia | Peloponnese | 61.84 | 38.16 |
| Cyclades | South Aegean | 62.73 | 37.27 |
| Dodecanese | South Aegean | 64.84 | 35.16 |
| Drama | Eastern Macedonia and Thrace | 57.08 | 42.92 |
| Elis | Western Greece | 65.00 | 35.00 |
| Euboea | Central Greece | 67.60 | 32.40 |
| Evros | Eastern Macedonia and Thrace | 54.64 | 45.36 |
| Evrytania | Central Greece | 55.89 | 44.11 |
| Florina | Western Macedonia | 62.89 | 37.11 |
| Grevena | Western Macedonia | 54.31 | 45.69 |
| Imathia | Central Macedonia | 64.58 | 35.42 |
| Ioannina | Epirus | 59.26 | 40.74 |
| Irakleiou (Heraklion) | Crete | 70.82 | 29.18 |
| Karditsa | Thessaly | 60.92 | 39.08 |
| Kastoria | Western Macedonia | 52.36 | 47.64 |
| Kavala | Eastern Macedonia and Thrace | 58.67 | 41.33 |
| Kilkis | Central Macedonia | 57.74 | 42.26 |
| Kozani | Western Macedonia | 63.16 | 36.84 |
| Laconia | Peloponnese | 51.17 | 48.83 |
| Larissa | Thessaly | 61.84 | 38.16 |
| Lasithi | Crete | 62.74 | 37.26 |
| Lefkada | Ionian Islands | 58.34 | 41.66 |
| Lesbos | North Aegean | 61.38 | 38.62 |
| Magnesia | Thessaly | 66.37 | 33.63 |
| Messenia | Peloponnese | 56.84 | 43.16 |
| Pella | Central Macedonia | 60.79 | 39.21 |
| Phocis | Central Greece | 57.36 | 42.64 |
| Phthiotis | Central Greece | 60.11 | 39.89 |
| Pieria | Central Macedonia | 60.92 | 39.08 |
| Piraeus A | Attica | 59.51 | 40.49 |
| Piraeus B | Attica | 72.51 | 27.49 |
| Preveza | Epirus | 58.13 | 41.87 |
| Rethymno | Crete | 65.33 | 34.67 |
| Rhodope | Eastern Macedonia and Thrace | 63.46 | 36.54 |
| Samos | North Aegean | 70.31 | 29.69 |
| Serres | Central Macedonia | 53.74 | 46.26 |
| Thesprotia | Epirus | 59.04 | 40.96 |
| Thessaloniki A | Central Macedonia | 60.92 | 39.08 |
| Thessaloniki B | Central Macedonia | 59.92 | 40.08 |
| Trikala | Thessaly | 58.67 | 41.33 |
| Xanthi | Eastern Macedonia and Thrace | 67.89 | 32.11 |
| Zakynthos | Ionian Islands | 67.31 | 32.69 |

== Aftermath ==
Three days after the referendum the government "formally asked for a three-year bailout from the Eurozone's rescue fund [on 8 July 2015] and pledged to start implementing some economic-policy overhauls" by mid-July 2015. European finance leaders scheduled a "crisis summit" on 12 July to consider the request. The Greek request was a "drastic turnaround" for Prime Minister Tsipras regarding "pension cuts, tax increases and other austerity measures." The total amount of loans requested in the Greek proposal was 53.5 billion euros (US$59 billion). The Greek parliament approved the Prime Minister's request on 10 July, and the completed package was forwarded to the Eurogroup in advance of the scheduled meeting. On Monday, 13 July, the Greek government signed a bailout package including 'worse' terms than the ones rejected via the referendum.

== See also ==
- Flip-flop
