= Public holidays in Greece =

According to Greek law every Sunday of the year is a public holiday. In addition, there are nine mandatory, official public holidays: New Year's Day 1 January, Theophany 6 January, Clean Monday (moveable), Greek Independence Day and Annunciation 25 March, Orthodox Good Friday (movable), Orthodox Easter Monday (movable), 1 May, Orthodox Pentecost Monday (movable), Dormition 15 August, Oxi Day 28 October, Nativity 25 December, and Synaxis of the Theotokos 26 December. There are, however, more public holidays celebrated in Greece than are announced by the Ministry of Labour each year as mandatory. The list of these non-fixed National Holidays rarely changes and has not changed in recent decades, giving a total of twelve National Holidays each year.

A public holiday that occurs on a Sunday is not transferred to another date, with the exception of 1 May, which is regarded by the locals more as a general strike than a public holiday.

In addition to the national holidays, some public holidays that are not celebrated nationwide, but only by a specific professional group or a local community. For example, many municipalities have a patron Saint also called 'Name Day' or a Liberation Day, and at this day it is customary for schools to have a day off.

== National holidays ==
National Holidays
Date	English name	Greek Name (transliterated/transcribed)	Greek Name	Remarks
1 January	New Year's Day	Protochroniá	Πρωτοχρονιά	Also celebrated ecclesiastically as the feast of St. Basil the Great and of the Circumcision of Christ.
6 January	Epiphany	Theophánia	Θεοφάνια	
moveable (day after Orthodox Carnival)	Clean Monday	Kathara Deftera	Καθαρά Δευτέρα	
25 March	Independence Day	Ikostí-pémpti Martíou (lit. 25 March)	Εικοστή Πέμπτη Μαρτίου	Anniversary of the declaration of the start of Greek War of Independence from the Ottoman Empire, in 1821.
moveable (day before Orthodox Easter)	Good Friday	Megáli Paraskeví	Μεγάλη Παρασκευή	
moveable (day after Orthodox Easter)	Easter Monday	Deftéra tou Páscha	Δευτέρα του Πάσχα	
1 May	Labour Day	Ergatikí Protomagiá (lit. 1 May of the Workers)	Εργατική Πρωτομαγιά	
moveable (day after Orthodox Pentecost)	Whit Monday	Deftéra tis Pentikostís	Του Αγίου Πνεύματος	
15 August	Dormition of the Mother of God	Kímisi tis Theotókou	Κοίμηση της Θεοτόκου	The most important celebration of the Virgin Mary.
28 October	Ohi Day	'To Ohi' or 'Imera tou Ohi' (lit. Day of the "No")	Το Όχι or Ημέρα του Όχι	Celebration of the Greek refusal to the Italian ultimatum of 1940.
25 December	Christmas Day	Christoúyenna	Χριστούγεννα	
26 December	Glorifying Mother of God	Sínaxis Yperagías Theotókou Marías	Σύναξις Υπεραγίας Θεοτόκου Μαρίας	The religious meaning of the holiday is a coming together to glorify the Theotokos, but in general and in effect the day is considered a holiday because it's the day after Christmas just like Boxing Day in some Commonwealth countries.

== Profession-specific holidays ==
Profession-specific Holidays
Date	English name	Greek Name (transliterated)	Greek Name	Applies to	Remarks
30 January	The Three Holy Hierarchs	Trion Ierarchon	Τριών Ιεραρχών	Education	Commemoration of the patron saints of education (St. Basil the Great, St. Gregory the Theologian, St. John Chrysostom)
17 November	Polytechnio	Polytechnio	Πολυτεχνείο	Education	Anniversary of the 1973 students protests against the junta of the colonels (1967–1974).

== Bibliography ==
- Tomkinson, John L. Festive Greece: A Calendar of Tradition. Athens: Anagnosis, 2003, ISBN 960-87186-7-8
- Τ.Ε.Ι. Σερρών, Τμήμα Λογιστικής
