= Menoume Europi =

Stay in Europe, also known by Menoume Europi or Menoume Evropi (Greek: Μένουμε Ευρώπη), is an initiative that started from Greek students at Oxford University and surged in Greece since the elections of 2015. The concerns over the Grexit activated people with different political, ideological and political positions who participated in mass demonstrations in Athens, Syntagma Square and in other major cities. The main slogan of these peaceful political protests was that Greeks want to stay in Europe, to keep the country within the European Union and the euro area. The belief was that the minimum consensus in politics in Greece during the negotiations over the austerity measures with the Members of eurozone, should be the European perspective of the country. From there on, all other political, social and other positions stated in the programmes of political parties are acceptable.

== History ==
This initiative was founded in 2012 by Greek students at Oxford University, and it spread among Greek students in other European universities. The first demonstration took place in Athens, Syntagma Square in June 2012 in between two major elections that brought to the country political instability and financial insecurity. A few hundred people participated in the demonstration demanding in the words of one of the organizers “reform and rebirth — and it would be much easier to do this if we stayed in the Eurozone”.

=== Second generation ===
The 2012–13 Cypriot financial meltdown similarly activated the island's civil society. A group of activists there came together under the slogan 'Stay in Europe'.

=== Third generation ===
In January 2015 Syriza won the election and formed a coalition government. Following unsuccessful negotiations, Grexit once again became a subject of debate. Mass demonstrations were organised this time in Athens and in other major cities, such as Thessaloniki and Patra. that surprised the coalition government, since it was the first mass political protest against its policy.

Once the government called for a referendum, 'Stay in Europe' organised the YES campaign.
