= Eleni Vitali =

Greek singer and composer (born 1954)

Eleni Vitali (Greek: Ελένη Βιτάλη; born 19 September 1954) is a Greek Romani popular singer and composer, active from the early 1970s.

== Life and career ==
Eleni Vitali was born in Athens on 19 September 1954, into a musical Hellenized-Gypsy family and was raised as a child living the typical Gypsy lifestyle by traveling across the country. Her father, Takis Lavidas, played the santur (a hammered dulcimer) and her mother, Lucy Karageorgiou, was a singer at festivals. In the early 1960s she began to succeed at the santur. She took part in the Thessaloniki Song Festival (with the song "Without a dime") and got into the music industry. She made her first performance in 1973, alongside Sotiria Bellou interpreting the song "Nobody can be patient" (Greek title "Δεν περισσεύει υπομονή", A. Kounadi-B. Goufas). She became known with the song "My carnation" (Greek title "Άι γαρούφαλό μου"), as well as through her participation in the "Festival with Manolios" at the same time.

In the early 1980s, she was active in popular music working with the best of their kind (Christos Nikolopoulos, T. Soukas, and others). Simultaneously participated in works of skillful composers (Stamatis Spanoudakis, Notis Mavroudis, Dionysis Savopoulos, George Andrew, Stamatis Kraounakis, George Stavrianos, Nick Portokaloglou, etc.) and recorded rebetika remakes of old popular and folk songs.

In 1989, Eleni Vitali recorded her "Opposite Balcony" and in 1993 "Who's Afraid of Virginia Woolf" in its own lyrics and music by entering into a period of maturity, which in the year 2000 with the album "Spotlight" recapitulates. She has made many appearances throughout Greece and Cyprus, while the first years of the course of doing concerts abroad singing for the Greeks abroad. In 1975 she married the musician Vangelis Xidi and in 1976 gave birth to their son Nick Xidi, known as a songwriter and producer of Greek music and discography.

== Discography ==
=== Songs ===
- 1973, Δεν Περισσεύει Υπομονή
- 1973, Ο Γιακουμής Ένα Μουλάρι Στην Οδό Σταδίου
- 1974, 18 Λιανοτράγουδα Της Πικρής Πατρίδας
- 1974, Ρόδα Είναι Και Γυρίζει
- 1974, Του Έρωτα Τ' Αντάρτη
- 1974, Βάστα Καρδιά
- 1974, 13ο Φεστιβάλ Ελληνικού Τραγουδιού
- 1974, Εκείνη Τη Νύχτα
- 1975, Παραλογές
- 1975, Η Κυρά Των Αμπελιών
- 1975, Ελένη Βιτάλη
- 1976, Τσαντιράκι
- 1977, Θεοδωράκης Με Αγάπη
- 1978, Η Ρεζέρβα
- 1979, Άιντε Και Φύγαμε
- 1980, Δημοτικά
- 1981, Πού Θα Τη Βρούμε Σήμερα
- 1981, Τα Δημοτικά Της Ελένης Βιτάλη
- 1982, Τα Ωραιότερα Τραγούδια Της
- 1982, Κύριε Των Δυνάμεων
- 1982, Παίξε Χρήστο Επειγόντως
- 1982, Ο Ήλιος Ο Ηλιάτορας
- 1983, Βάρα Μου Το Ντέφι
- 1983, Ο Τραγουδιστής
- 1984, Ξαφνικός Έρωτας
- 1984, Χορέψτε Γιατί Χανόμαστε
- 1984, Πάντα Τέτοια
- 1984, Και Μαζί Και Μόνος
- 1985, Εδώ Θεσσαλονίκη
- 1985, 7 Παρακλήσεις
- 1985, Λαϊκές Εικόνες
- 1985, Μια Γυναίκα Μπορεί
- 1986, Ένας Είναι Ο Σούκας
- 1986, Ώρα Ελλάδος
- 1986, Τραγούδια Για Τους Φίλους Μου
- 1987, Χρήστος Νικολόπουλος: Ζωντανή Ηχογράφηση
- 1987, Ζήτω Το Ελληνικό Τραγούδι
- 1988, Και Μπήκαμε Στα Χρόνια
- 1988, Τα Λαϊκά Της Ελένης
- 1989, Οι Μεγαλύτερες Επιτυχίες Της
- 1989, Κάπου Ανατολικοδυτικά
- 1989, Ε Και Τι Έγινε
- 1989, Φως Αυγούστου
- 1989, Το Απέναντι Μπαλκόνι
- 1990, Άνεμος Είναι
- 1990, Όλα Τα Μωρά Στην Πίστα
- 1990, Ίσως Φταίνε Τα Φεγγάρια
- 1990, Ευριπίδη Μήδεια
- 1991, Στα Ξενυχτάδικα Της Αγκαλιάς Σου
- 1991, Δρόμοι Που Αγάπησα
- 1991, Γεια Σας Που Πέφτουν Τα Σύνορα;
- 1991, Η Πόλη Που Ονειρεύτηκα
- 1992, Το Τραγούδι Γυμνό
- 1992, Γι' Άλλες Πολιτείες/16 Επιτυχίες
- 1993, Οι Δικοί Μας Τσιγγάνοι
- 1993, Μέρες Μουσικής/Σύγχρονο Λαϊκό Τραγούδι
- 1994, Ποιος Φοβάται Τη Βιρτζίνια Γουλφ;
- 1994, Όμορφό Μου Καλοκαίρι
- 1995, Βαλκανιζατέρ
- 1996, Άσωτος Υιός
- 1997, Εμπειριών Συλλέκτης
- 1998, Το Μαύρο Πρόβατο
- 1998, Θα Ταξιδέψω Την Ψυχή
- 1999, Καταθέτω
- 2000, Τα Σερέτικα
- 2000, Προσκήνιο
- 2000, Άι Γαρούφαλό Μου-36 Μεγάλες Επιτυχίες
- 2001, Διαμαρτύρομαι
- 2001, Της Αγάπης Χρώματα
- 2001, Τα Καλύτερα Τραγούδια Της
- 2001, Οι Μεγαλύτερες Επιτυχίες Της
- 2002, Ένας Χειμώνας Για Δυο
- 2002, Στην Ηχώ Του Έρωτα
- 2002, Οπωσδήποτε Παράθυρο
- 2002, Φωτιά Στις Νύχτες
- 2003, Μονά Στολίδια
- 2003, 36 Μεγάλες Επιτυχίες
- 2003, Δική Μου Η Χαρά
- 2003, Smyrne
- 2004, Δυο Δρόμοι Δυο Φεγγάρια
- 2004, Δημοτικοί Αντίλαλοι Νο1
- 2004, Δημοτικοί Αντίλαλοι Νο3
- 2004, Στο Φως Της Ακρόπολης
- 2004, Ό,τι Αγάπησα
- 2005, Ακολούθα Τα Πουλιά
- 2006, Λαϊκά Για Πάντα
- 2006, Έρημα Χωριά
- 2006, Διαδρομή
- 2006, 14 Μεγάλα Τραγούδια
- 2006, Ποιο Δρόμο Να Πάρω
- 2006, Δωδεκάορτο
- 2007, Ανθολόγιο
- 2007, Tsayiori
- 2007, Όταν Λείπει
- 2007, Είτε Έχεις Είτε Δεν Έχεις
- 2007, Βάστα Καρδιά-Επανέκδοση
- 2008, Επτά...Και Να Προσέχεις
- 2008, Τα Δημοτικά Της Ελένης Βιτάλη/15 Τραγούδια
- 2008, Τα Λαϊκά Της Ελένης Βιτάλη
- 2008, Τραγούδια Που Αγάπησα
- 2009, Ζωντανό Κύτταρο Live
- 2019, Πέρασ’ Από Δω η Ελένη
