= First Shadow Cabinet of Antonis Samaras =

The First Shadow Cabinet of Antonis Samaras was formed in 2009. A reshuffle was made in 2011. Following the June 2012 Greek legislative election, the Cabinet of Antonis Samaras was formed. The Shadow Cabinet of Alexis Tsipras became the next Shadow Cabinet.

== Formation ==
The Shadow Cabinet was formed in December 2009, following the 2009 Greek legislative election. There was a "radical" cabinet reshuffle in January 2011. The Shadow Cabinet was dissolved following the May 2012 Greek legislative election, as there was no official opposition to the Caretaker Cabinet of Panagiotis Pikrammenos. Following the ND-PASOK-DIMAR coalition after the June 2012 Greek legislative election, the Cabinet of Antonis Samaras was formed, and the Shadow Cabinet of Alexis Tsipras became the next Shadow Cabinet.

== Shadow Cabinet composition ==
- Leader of the Opposition and Leader of New Democracy – Antonis Samaras
- Shadow Minister for Foreign Affairs – Dimitris Avramopoulos
- Shadow Minister of Finance – Antonis Samaras
- Shadow Deputy Minister of Finance for Economic Policy - Christos Staikouras
- Shadow Deputy Minister of Finance for Taxation - Theodoros Karaoglou
- Shadow Development and Competitiveness Minister – Kostis Chatzidakis
- Shadow Labour and Social Solidary Minister – Yiannis Vroutsi
- Shadow Public Administration Minister – Christos Zois
- Shadow Minister for Citizen Protection and Justice Minister – Nikos Dendias
- Shadow Minister for National Defence – Costas Tasoulas
- Shadow Environment Minister - Kyriakos Mitsotakis
- Shadow Minister for Education and Religious Affairs - Eliza Vozemberg
- Shadow Energy Minister - Mihalis Yiannakis
- Shadow Tourism Minister - Olga Kefalogianni
- Shadow Agriculture Minister - George Kasapidis
- Shadow Merchant Marine Minister - Yiannis Plakiotakis
- Parliamentary Representative - Costas Tzavaras
- Party Spokesperson – Panos Panagiotopoulos

=== 2011 reshuffle ===
- Leader of the Opposition and Leader of New Democracy – Antonis Samaras
- Shadow Minister for Foreign Affairs – Panos Panagiotopoulos
- Shadow Alternate Minister for Foreign Affairs - Costas Gioulekas
- Shadow Minister of Finance – Antonis Samaras
- Shadow Alternate Minister of Finance - Christos Staikouras
- Shadow Alternate Minister of Finance - Notis Mitarachi
- Shadow Alternate Minister of Finance - Yiannis Vroutsis
- Shadow Minister for the Interior
- Shadow Development and Competitiveness Minister – Kostis Chatzidakis
- Shadow Labour and Social Solidary Minister – Yiannis Vroutsi
- Shadow Public Administration Minister – Christos Zois
- Shadow Minister for Citizen Protection – Thanassis Nakos
- Shadow Minister for National Defence – Margaritis Tzimas
- Shadow Environment Minister - Kyriakos Mitsotakis
- Shadow Alternate Environment Minister - Nicos Kanteres
- Shadow Alternate Environment Minister - Theodora Avgerinopoulou
- Shadow Energy Minister - Mihalis Yiannakis
- Shadow Tourism Minister - Olga Kefalogianni
- Shadow Agriculture Minister - George Kasapidis
- Shadow Minister for Education and Religious Affairs - Aris Spiliotopoulos
- Shadow Justice Minister - Costas Tzavaras
- Shadow Alternate Justice Minister - Costas Karagounis
- Shadow Merchant Marine Minister - Yiannis Plakiotakis
- Shadow Minister for Media - Simos Kedikoglou
- Shadow Health Minister - Thanassis Yiannopoulos
- Shadow Alternate Health Minister - Gerassimos Yiakoumatos
- Parliamentary Representative - Nikos Dendias
- Party Spokesperson - Yiannis Mihelakis
