= Yannis Dragasakis =

Greek politician

- Γιάννης Δραγασάκης
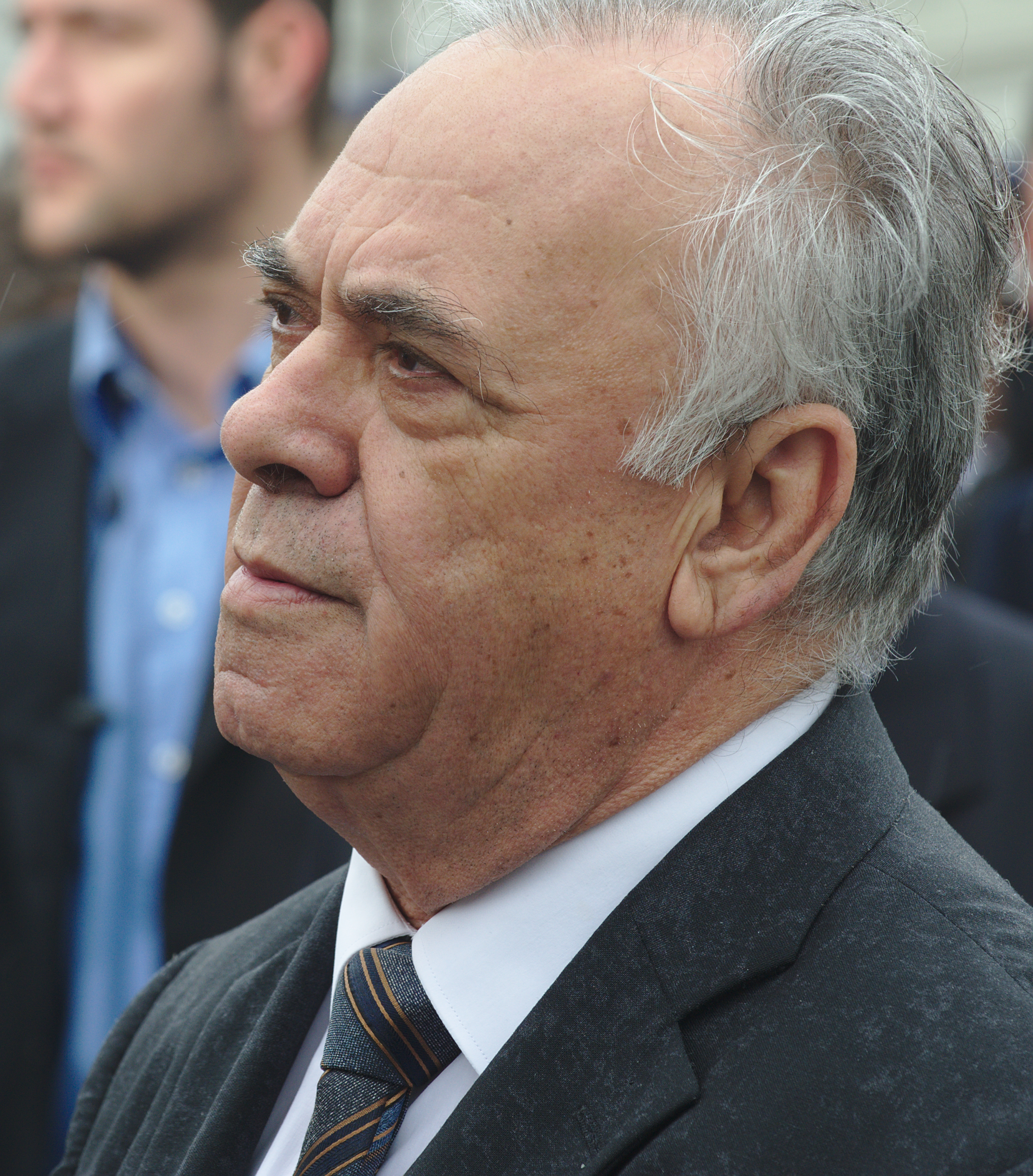

Deputy Prime Minister of Greece
- In office 23 September 2015 – 8 July 2019
- Prime Minister: Alexis Tsipras
- Succeeded by: Panagiotis Pikrammenos
- In office 27 January 2015 – 28 August 2015
- Prime Minister: Alexis Tsipras
- Preceded by: Evangelos Venizelos

Minister for Economy and Development
- In office 28 February 2018 – 8 July 2019
- Prime Minister: Alexis Tsipras
- Preceded by: Dimitri B. Papadimitriou
- Succeeded by: Adonis Georgiadis

4th Deputy Speaker of the Hellenic Parliament
- In office 2012–2014
- Preceded by: Tasos Kourakis
- Succeeded by: Nikitas Kaklamanis
- In office 7 October 2008 – 14 October 2009
- Succeeded by: Athanasios Leventis

Alternate Minister of National Economy
- In office 13 November 1989 – 13 February 1990
- Prime Minister: Xenophon Zolotas

Member of the Hellenic Parliament for Athens B
- In office 22 September 1996 – 7 September 2009
- In office 6 May 2012 – 28 August 2015

Member of the Hellenic Parliament for Chania
- In office 5 November 1989 – 22 September 1996

Personal details
- Born: 1 January 1947 (age 79) Anatoli, Lasithi, Kingdom of Greece
- Party: Syriza (2013–2024)
- Other political affiliations: Synaspismos

Yannis Dragasakis (Greek: Γιάννης Δραγασάκης; born 1 January 1947) is a Greek politician and who served as Deputy Prime Minister of Greece from 27 January to 28 August 2015 and 23 September 2015 to 8 July 2019. He is a member of the Greek Parliament for the Coalition of the Radical Left (SYRIZA) for the Athens B constituency.

== Early life and education ==
Dragasakis was born in the village of Anatoli, Lasithi, Crete. He studied political science and economics in Greece and at London School of Economics and has worked as an economist, researcher and business advisor for different companies in Europe. He was a member of the mission of the Greek Parliament in the Organization for Security and Co-operation in Europe and the Parliamentary Assembly of the Council of Europe.

== Political career ==
He was a prominent member of the Central Committee of the Communist Party of Greece until 1991 when he resigned to join Synaspismos, and became one of their founding members. He later became a member of Syriza.

Dragasakis was first elected as a Member of the Hellenic Parliament (MP) in 1989 for the Coalition of the Left of Movements and Ecology, in the constituency of Chania. He was re-elected in 1996 for Athens B. At all subsequent elections, he has been re-elected, but since 2004, he has stood for Syriza.

On 13 November 1989, he was appointed Alternate Minister of National Economy in the Ecumenical Cabinet of Xenophon Zolotas, and served in this role until 13 February 1990, when he was removed in a cabinet reshuffle.

On 7 October 2008, he was elected as Deputy Speaker of the Hellenic Parliament, the first Deputy Speaker from Syriza's parliamentary group. He served for a one-year period, but was elected again in 2012, serving the whole legislative period until December 2014.

Dragasakis is one of the "economic quartet" of Syriza, the four main economists responsible for their economic policy, alongside Euclid Tsakalotos, Giorgos Stathakis and John Milios.

=== Deputy Prime Minister ===
Following the January 2015 legislative election, Syriza formed a coalition government with ANEL. Alexis Tsipras, the leader of Syriza, became Prime Minister, and in turn appointed Dragasakis as Deputy Prime Minister. In March 2015, Dragasakis co-authored an article in the Financial Times with Yanis Varoufakis and Euclid Tsakalotos that asked Greece's creditors to give them a chance.

After Yanis Varoufakis, the Minister of Finance, resigned on 6 July, Dragasakis was named as a potential successor. Varoufakis was later succeeded by Euclid Tsakalotos.

=== Return to parliament ===
Following the resignation of MP Effie Achtsioglou, who had defected from Syriza to a new party in 2023, Dragasakis replaced her as MP for Athens B2.

== Personal life ==
Dragasakis speaks English as well as Greek. He has two daughters, Marianna and Rinio. Friends have described him as "rigid and inflexible in terms of socialist perspective", but also tactical as he "the realism of everyday life". He has also been described as "grounded in reality".

According to Stathis Kouvelakis, former Syriza spokesperson, Dragasakis is widely considered to have strong personal relationships with the Greek bankers, going back to his early career.

Political offices
Preceded by Evangelos Venizelos	Deputy Prime Minister of Greece; 27 January 2015 – 8 July 2019	Succeeded by Panagiotis Pikrammenos
