= George Chouliarakis =

Greek academic and politician

George Chouliarakis Γιώργος Χουλιαράκης

Alternate Minister of Finance
- In office 23 September 2015 – 9 July 2019
- Prime Minister: Alexis Tsipras
- Minister: Euclid Tsakalotos
- Preceded by: Dimitris Mardas

Minister of Finance
- In office 28 August 2015 – 23 September 2015
- Prime Minister: Vassiliki Thanou-Christophilou
- Preceded by: Euclid Tsakalotos
- Succeeded by: Euclid Tsakalotos

Personal details
- Born: Iasmos, Greece
- Party: Independent
- Education: University of Athens; University of London; University of Warwick

Academic work
- Discipline: Macroeconomics; Economic history Labour economics
- Institutions: University of Essex; University of Warwick; University of Manchester

George Chouliarakis (Greek: Γιώργος Χουλιαράκης), also transliterated as Giorgos Houliarakis, is a Greek academic and politician who served as an Alternate Minister of Finance in the Second Cabinet of Alexis Tsipras, serving under Euclid Tsakalotos. Chouliarakis was formerly the interim Minister of Finance in the caretaker government led by Vassiliki Thanou-Christophilou.

He led the technical negotiations of the third bailout package from May to August 2015. He currently serves as economic advisor to the Governor of the Bank of Greece, Yannis Stournaras.

== Education ==
Chouliarakis was born in Iasmos and studied economics at the University of Athens, before completing a Master's degree at the University of London. He later completed his PhD in economics at the University of Warwick.

== Academic career ==
Chouliarakis has taught economics at the University of Essex, and has been a research fellow at the Institute for Employment Research of the University of Warwick. He is currently the Jean Monnet Lecturer in European Economic Integration at the University of Manchester. He is also a visiting scholar at the Bank of Greece and a fellow of the Euro Area Business Cycle Network.

His research interests include macroeconomics, economic history, labour economics, international macroeconomics and the macroeconomics of monetary unions.

== Political career ==
Chouliarakis has served as Chairman of the Council of Economic Advisers (SOE), and in this capacity has accompanied ministers, such as Euclid Tsakalotos, to meetings in Brussels. He has also been described as an "ally" of the Deputy Prime Minister of Greece, Yannis Dragasakis.

In late April 2015, Chouliarakis was rebrought in as the chief Greek negotiator in the team negotiating the terms of the third bailout package. He replaced Nicholas Theocarakis, who was considered an ally of Yanis Varoufakis. Chouliarakis was praised by Thomas Wieser, the president of the EU's Economic and Financial Committee, as being a "gifted negotiator". He has been called "the invisible negotiator" by some of the Athens media due to being notoriously media-shy. The Wall Street Journal described him as a "constructive interlocutor". Alternatively, Yanis Varoufakis describes Chourialakis as instrumental to the failure of Syriza's first negotiations, "[demonstrating] himself and his team to be utterly unwilling and possibly incapable of doing anything beyond regurgitating the troika's models and projections". Varoufakis claimed that Chouliarakis did not inform him that a document listing proposals (which Chouliarakis brought him before the pair edited and later distributed it) was first created at the European Commission. Journalists found this when looking at the document's properties, embarrassing Varoufakis by giving the impression he had capitulated. Varoufakis also claims that Chouliarakis neglected to inform him of a deadline for an extension of loan repayments, putting him in a difficult negotiating position. Given these two failures, Varoufakis removed him from his position, believing that he was in “cahoots” and that his cynicism was “extraordinary”.

On 28 August 2015, Chouliarakis was sworn in as the interim Minister of Finance in the Caretaker Cabinet of Vassiliki Thanou-Christophilou, replacing Euclid Tsakalotos. His appointment was praised by Jeroen Dijsselbloem, the president of the Eurogroup, who said: "[Chouliarakis] knows what he's doing because he was top man in the ministry for the past year and half." Tsakalotos also praised his successor, saying: "I am certain that with his work, as always, and with his devotion to the public good it would be difficult to think of a better interim finance minister, someone who loves what he does and does it very well."

Following the September legislative election and the formation of the second Tsipras cabinet, Chouliarakis was re-appointed to the Ministry of Finance as an Alternate Minister of Finance, serving under Tsakalotos as Minister of Finance. His responsibilities included overseeing the national accounts office, "a post seen as critical to achieving the ambitious fiscal targets set by the bailout programme" according to the Financial Times. Chouliarakis, in his capacity as an Alternate Minister of Finance, is also a member of the Board of Directors of the European Financial Stability Facility (EFSF). Chouliarakis has also resumed the role of Chairman of the Council of Economic Advisors (SOE), and in that capacity is a member of the Board of Directors of the Greek Public Debt Management Agency.

== Article and papers ==
- "Deja vu? The Greek crisis experience, the 2010s versus the 1930s. Lessons from history" (with Sophia Lazaretou, Working Paper, Bank of Greece, No. 176, February 2014) PDF
- "A fair wage model of unemployment with inertia in fairness perceptions" (with Mónica Correa-López, Oxford Economic Papers, 2012)
- "Monetary institutions, imperfect competition and employment outcomes" (with Mónica Correa-López, The North-American Journal of Economics and Finance, Volume 22, Issue 2, pp. 131–148, 2011)
- "Business cycle synchronization since 1880" (with Michael Artis and P. K. G. Harischandra, The Manchester School, Volume 72, Issue 2, pp. 173–207, 2011) PDF
- "Do exchange rate regimes matter for inflation persistence?" (with P. K. G. Harischandra, Theory and Evidence from the History of UK and US Inflation, 2008) PDF
- "Catching-up, then falling behind: Comparative productivity growth between Spain and the United Kingdom, 1950-2004" (with Mónica Correa-López, Centre for Growth and Business Cycle Research Discussion Paper Series, University of Manchester, No. 131, 2009)

== See also ==
- Greek government-debt crisis

Political offices
Preceded by Euclid Tsakalotos	Minister of Finance; 2015	Succeeded by Euclid Tsakalotos
