= Haris Theoharis =

Greek politician (born 1970)

- Χάρης Θεοχάρης
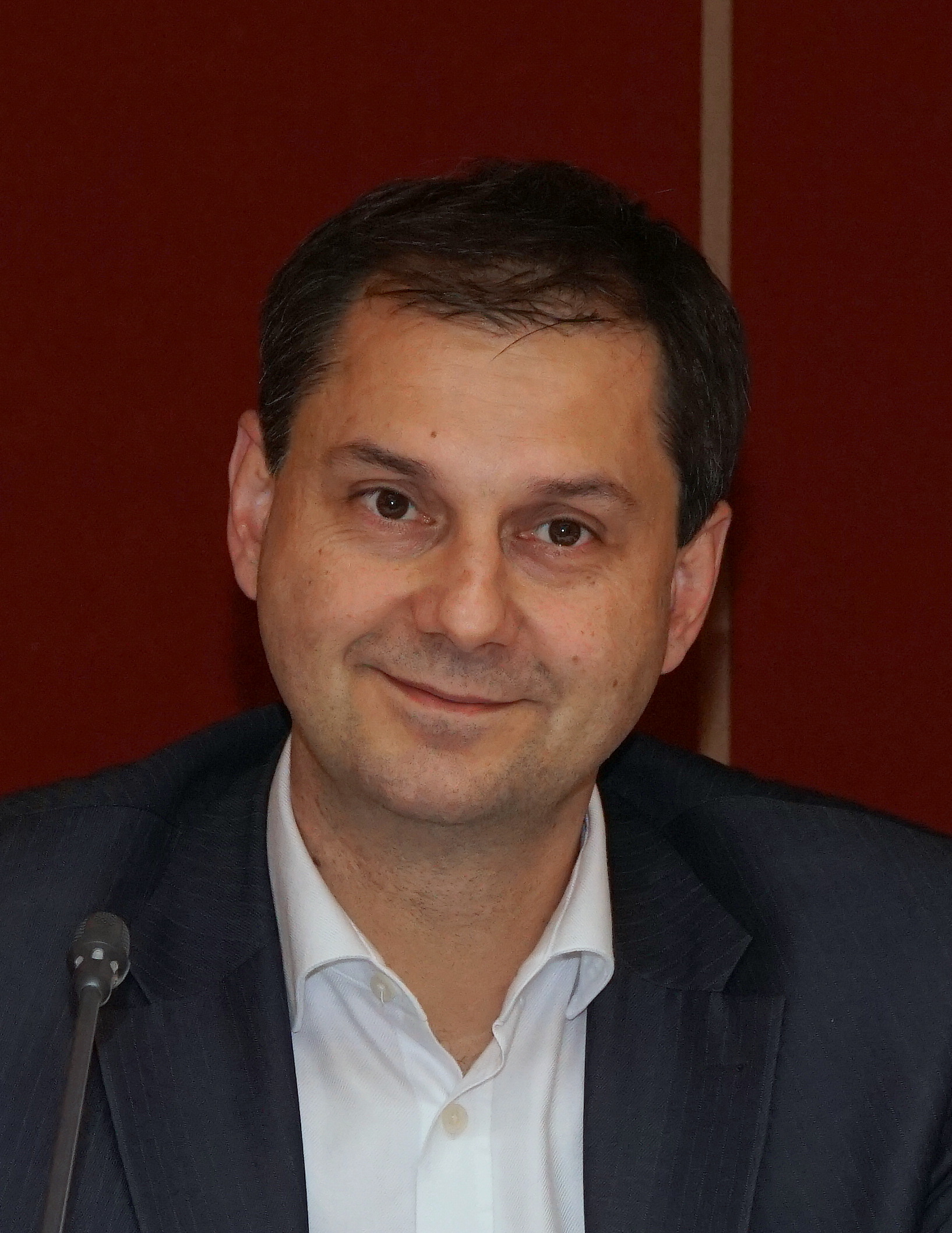

Deputy Minister of National Economy and Finance
- In office 27 June 2023 – 14 June 2024
- Prime Minister: Kyriakos Mitsotakis
- Minister: Kostis Hatzidakis

Minister of Tourism
- In office 9 July 2019 – 31 August 2021
- Preceded by: Thanasis Theoharopoulos
- Succeeded by: Vassilis Kikilias

Personal details
- Born: Θεοχάρης Θεοχάρης; August 6, 1970 (age 55) Athens
- Party: Nea Demokratia
- Other political affiliations: Democratic Responsibility; The River
- Cabinet: Kyriakos Mitsotakis I Kyriakos Mitsotakis II
- Website: www.htheoharis.gr

Haris Theoharis (Greek: Χάρης Θεοχάρης; born 6 August 1970) is a Greek politician, member of the Hellenic Parliament for New Democracy, and former head of the department of revenue during the Greek government-debt crisis. He previously served as Minister for Tourism in the Cabinet of Kyriakos Mitsotakis. He was first elected to parliament in January 2015 representing The River, but left the party in April 2016 and sat as an independent. He co-founded a small liberal party called Democratic Responsibility with former PASOK minister Alekos Papadopoulos in July 2016, but was expelled in October of the same year. He continued to sit in parliament as an independent before joining New Democracy's parliamentary group in December 2018, and was elected on the party's ticket in the 2019 election. He holds a MEng (Hon) in software engineering-first class from Imperial College, London, and has held high-ranking positions in companies of the private sector in Greece and abroad. During 2011-2012, he served as secretary general for information systems and he is known for introducing new digital services to assist the public, helping reduce bureaucracy and its resulting costs. He later (2013–14) served as a secretary general for public revenues at the Greek Finance Ministry. There, he succeeded in meeting budget revenues and producing a fiscal surplus. He is also known for launching the Publicrevenue platform to increase transparency in public administration.
