= First Shadow Cabinet of Alexis Tsipras =

The First Shadow Cabinet of Alexis Tsipras was formed on 3 July 2012, following the June 2012 Greek legislative election. It consisted of only Syriza MPs, as they were the largest party to refuse to participate in the ND-PASOK-DIMAR coalition. The Shadow Cabinet was dissolved following the January 2015 Greek legislative election, and was replaced by a New Democracy shadow cabinet led by Antonis Samaras. Tsipras subsequently formed his First Cabinet on 27 January 2015, consisting of a coalition of both Syriza and the Independent Greeks.

== History ==
The Shadow Cabinet was formed on 3 July 2012, with the final composition being settled at a meeting of the Syriza parliamentary group at 11am on that day. The Shadow Cabinet acted in opposition to the Cabinet of Antonis Samaras. Whilst in opposition, in December 2014, Syriza adopted the Thessaloniki Programme, an economic manifesto.

The Shadow Cabinet would have officially remained in position until the 27 January 2015, when Alexis Tsipras named his new Cabinet. A number of members from the Shadow Cabinet took up roles in the new Cabinet.

== Role of shadow ministers ==
The role of shadow ministers was to oversee the work being carried out by the government ministers and to offer alternative proposals. Syriza spokesman Dimitrios Papadimoulis said: "Syriza will be exercising hands-on, combative and responsible opposition, with strict oversight and also with its own proposals. It will be an opposition worthy of the 27 percent of the vote that put us in Parliament."

== Shadow Cabinet composition ==
- Leader of the Opposition and Leader of Syriza – Alexis Tsipras
- Shadow Minister for Foreign Affairs – Rena Dourou
- Shadow Minister of Finance – Euclid Tsakalotos
- Shadow Minister for the Interior – Sofia Sakorafa
- Shadow Development and Infrastructure Minister – Giorgos Stathakis
- Shadow Labour Minister – Dimitris Stratoulis
- Shadow Minister for Administrative Reform – Alexis Mitropoulos
- Shadow Minister for Citizen Protection – Dimitris Tsoukalas
- Shadow Minister for the Environment – Iro Dioti
- Shadow Energy Minister – Thanassis Petrakos
- Shadow Health Minister – Andreas Xanthos
- Shadow Minister for National Defence and Shipping – Thodoris Dritsas
- Shadow Education Ministers – Tasos Kourakis and Theano Fotiou
- Shadow Justice Minister – Zoi Konstantopoulou
- Shadow Minister for Agricultural Development – Vangelis Apostolou
- Shadow Tourism Minister – Michael Kritsotakis
- Shadow Minister for Macedonia and Thrace – Litsa Amanatidou
- Parliamentary Representative – Panagiotis Kouroumblis
