= Fotiou =

Fotiou (Greek: Φωτίου) is a Greek surname. It is the surname of:

- Damien Fotiou, Australian actor.
- Elli Fotiou (born 1939), Greek actress.
- Panagiotis Fotiou (born 1964), Greek long-distance runner.
- Theano Fotiou (born 1946), Greek architect and government minister.
- Harikleia Fotiou (1918–1984), Greek painter and engraver.
