= Heather D. Gibson =

Scottish economist

Heather Denise Gibson (Greek: Χέδερ Ντενίζ Γκίμπσον) is a Scottish economist currently serving as Director-Advisor to the Bank of Greece (since 2011). She was the spouse of Euclid Tsakalotos, former Greek Minister of Finance.

== Academic career ==
Before assuming her duties at the Bank of Greece and alternating child-rearing duties with her husband, Gibson worked at the University of Kent, where she published two volumes on international exchange rate mechanisms and wrote numerous articles on this and other topics, sometimes in cooperation with her husband, who was teaching at Kent at the time.

== Personal life ==
Gibson first came to Greece in 1993, with her husband, with whom she took turns away from their respective economic studies to raise their three children while the other worked.

The couple maintain two homes in Kifisia, along with an office in Athens and a vacation home in Preveza. In 2013, this proved detrimental to Tsakalotos and his party when his critics began calling him «αριστερός αριστοκράτης» (aristeros aristokratis, "aristocrat of the left"), while newspapers opposed to the Syriza party seized on his property holdings as a chance to accuse the couple of hypocrisy for enjoying a generous lifestyle in private while criticizing the "ethic of austerity" in public. One opposition newspaper published on the front page criticism reasoning that Tsakalotos own family wealth came from the same sort of investments in companies as made by financial institutions JP Morgan and BlackRock.

== Works ==
=== Editor ===
- Economic Bulletin, Bank of Greece

=== Books ===
- The Eurocurrency Markets, Domestic Financial Policy and International Instability (London, etc., Longman: 1989) ISBN 0312028261
- International Finance: Exchange Rates and Financial Flows in the International Financial System (London, etc., Longman: 1996) ISBN 0582218136
- Economic Transformation, Democratization and Integration into the European Union (London: Palgrave Macmillan: 2001) ISBN 9780333801222

=== Articles and papers ===
- "Fundamentally Wrong: Market Pricing of Sovereigns and the Greek Financial Crisis," Journal of Macroeconomics, Elsevier, vol. 39(PB), pp. 405–419 (with Stephen G. & Tavlas, George S., 2014)
- "Capital flows and speculative attacks in prospective EU member states" (with Euclid Tsakalotos, Economics of Transition Volume 12, Issue 3, pages 559–586, September 2004)
- "A Unifying Framework for Analysing Offsetting Capital Flows and Sterilisation: Germany and the ERM" (with Sophocles Brissimis & Euclid Tsakalotos, International Journal of Finance & Economics, 2002, vol. 7, issue 1, pp. 63–78)
- "Internal vs External Financing of Acquisitions: Do Managers Squander Retained Profits" (with Andrew Dickerson and Euclid Tsakalotos, Studies in Economics, 1996; Oxford Bulletin of Economics and Statistics, 2000)
- "Are Aggregate Consumption Relationships Similar Across the European Union" (with Alan Carruth & Euclid Tsakalotos, Regional Studies, Volume 33, Issue 1, 1999)
- Takeover Risk and the Market for Corporate Control: The Experience of British Firms in the 1970s and 1980 (with Andrew Dickerson and Euclid Tsakalotos, 1998) PDF
- "The Impact of Acquisitions on Company Performance: Evidence from a Large Panel of UK Firms" (with Andrew Dickerson and Euclid Tsakalotos, Oxford Economic Papers New Series, Vol. 49, No. 3 (Jul., 1997), pp. 344–361)
- "Short-Termism and Underinvestment: The Influence of Financial Systems" (with Andrew Dickerson and Euclid Tsakalotos, The Manchester School of Economic & Social Studies, 1995, vol. 63, issue 4, pp. 351–67)
- "Testing a Flow Model of Capital Flight in Five European Countries" (with Euclid Tsakalotos, The Manchester School of Economic and Social Studies, Volume 61, Issue 2, pp. 144–166, June 1993)
- Full list of articles by Heather D Gibson. researchgate.net. Recovered 7 July 2015
