= Nicholas Theocarakis =

Greek economist (born 1956)

- Νίκος Θεοχαράκης

Secretary General of Fiscal Policy
- In office 4 March 2015 – 16 October 2015
- Appointed by: Yanis Varoufakis
- Prime Minister: Alexis Tsipras
- Minister: Euclid Tsakalotos
- Preceded by: Emmanuel Mamatzakis
- Succeeded by: Fragkiskos Koutentakis

Personal details
- Born: 1956 Athens, Greece
- Party: Independent
- Education: Athens University, Cambridge University
- Website: Information at IDEAS / RePEc

Nicholas Theocarakis, also transcribed as Nikos Theocharakis (Greek: Νίκος Θεοχαράκης, born 1956), is a Greek economist and professor of economics at Athens University. He is the author of several books and contributions on economic theory and history of economic thought.

In March 2015, he was appointed General Secretary of Fiscal Policy leading the technical negotiations of the Greek Ministry of Finance with the Eurogroup. At the end of April, PM Alexis Tsipras made changes in the negotiation team.

== Early life and education ==
Born 1956, Theocharakis visited the Varvakeio model high school in Athens, receiving his diploma in 1974. He studied Economics at the National and Kapodistrian University of Athens and at the Churchill College of Cambridge University, where he graduated in 1979. At Cambridge University he would later also complete his doctoral thesis in economics.

== Career ==
Since 1988 Theocharakis has been teaching political economy and History of economic thought. Previously an assistant professor, in 2013 he was promoted to the status of an associated professor at the Department of Economics of Athens University. He has served twice as the director of the Political Economy division. Before his appointment as Secretary General he has served as director of UADPhilEcon, the doctoral program in economics of the University of Athens and as the Faculty of Economic and Social Sciences representative to the University of Athens Research Committee.

Previously Theocarakis had also worked in the private sector and served as a board member at the Emporiki Bank, Egnatia Bank and Ethniki Asfalistiki. Before his appointment as assistant professor at the Department of Economics of the University of Athens he worked as Deputy Managing Director of Nic. J. Theocarakis S.A.

An academic colleague, regular co-author and confidant of Greek ex-Minister of Finance Yanis Varoufakis, Theocharakis on 4 March 2015 was appointed the ministry's new Secretary General for Fiscal Policy. Until the end of April 2015 he was in charge of the negotiations in the Brussels Group and the Ministry of Finance representative in the Eurogroup Working Group. He resigned from the position of Secretary General for Fiscal Policy in October 2015. From late October 2015 he is the Scientific Director and Chairman of KEPE (Centre of Planning and Economic Research). He resigned his position in July 2019 and he was replaced by Prof. P. Liargovas in October 2019. In February 2016 he was appointed by the Ministry of Culture Chairman of the Board of Directors of Megaron-The Athens Concert Hall.

== Selected publications ==
English monograph

- Modern Political Economics: Making sense of the post-2008 world. (with Yanis Varoufakis and Joseph Halevi). London and New York: Routledge. 2011. ISBN 978-0-415-42888-0.

English contributions

- "Disparaging liberal economics in nineteenth-century Greece: The case of "The economist's duck" (with Michalis M. Psalidopoulos)". The European Journal of the History of Economic Thought. 15 October 2015. doi:10.1080/09672567.2015.1088879.
- "The dissemination of economic thought in South-Eastern Europe in the nineteenth century" (with Michalis M. Psalidopoulos). In: Heinz-Dieter Kurz et al.: The Dissemination of Economic Ideas. Edward Elgar, 2011, ISBN 978-0-85793-557-1. pp. 161–191.
- Theocarakis, Nicholas J. (13 June 2011). "The reception of Adam Smith in Greece: a most peculiar metakenosis". Adam Smith Review. Vol. 7. pp. 148–165. doi:10.2139/ssrn.1864189. SSRN 1864189.
- Theocarakis, Nicholas J. (2010). "Metamorphoses: The Concept of Labour in the History of Political Economy". Economic and Labour Relations Review. 9 (2): 7–38. doi:10.1177/103530461002000202. S2CID 154951640.
- "Antipeponthos and reciprocity: the concept of equivalent exchange from Aristotle to Turgot". International Review of Economics. Vol. 55, no. 1. April 2008. pp. 29–44.
- "Nicomachean Ethics Political Economy: The Trajectory of the Problem of Value". History of Economic Ideas. Vol. 14, no. 1. 2006. pp. 9–54.

Greek monographs

- Η νεοκλασική θεωρία της εργασίας [The neoclassical theory of labor]. Athens: Typothito. 2005. ISBN 978-960-402-154-3.
- Μικροοικονομικά υποδείγματα μερικής και γενικής [Microeconomic Models of Partial and General Equilibrium]. (with Yanis Varoufakis). Athens: Typothito. 2005. ISBN 978-960-402-240-3.
