= Democratic Responsibility =

Greek political party

Democratic Responsibility Δημοκρατική Ευθύνη Dimokratiki Efthini
- President: Vasileios Pavlidis
- Founder: Alekos Papadopoulos, Harry Theocharis
- Founded: 7 July 2017; 9 years ago
- Dissolved: 2022
- Ideology: Centrism; Patriotism; Social liberalism; Economic liberalism; Pro-Europeanism; Syncretic politics
- Political position: Centre
- Colours: Orange; Teal
- Slogan: Revolutionary Rationalism; Επαναστατικός Ορθολογισμός
- Parliament: 0 / 300
- European Parliament: 0 / 21

Website
- https://dimokratikiefthini.gr/

Democratic Responsibility (Greek: Δημοκρατική Ευθύνη, romanized: Dimokratikí Efthýni) was a Greek centrist political party founded by the former minister of PASOK Alekos Papadopoulos and independent MP Harry Theoharis. The current president of the party is Vasileios Pavlidis, an economist from Thessaloniki.

== Electoral results ==
=== European elections ===
| Year | Party leader | Number of votes | Vote percentage | Seats | Position | Change |
|---|---|---|---|---|---|---|
| 2019 | Thomas Papaliagas | 18,170 | 0.32% | 0 / 21 | 27th | - |

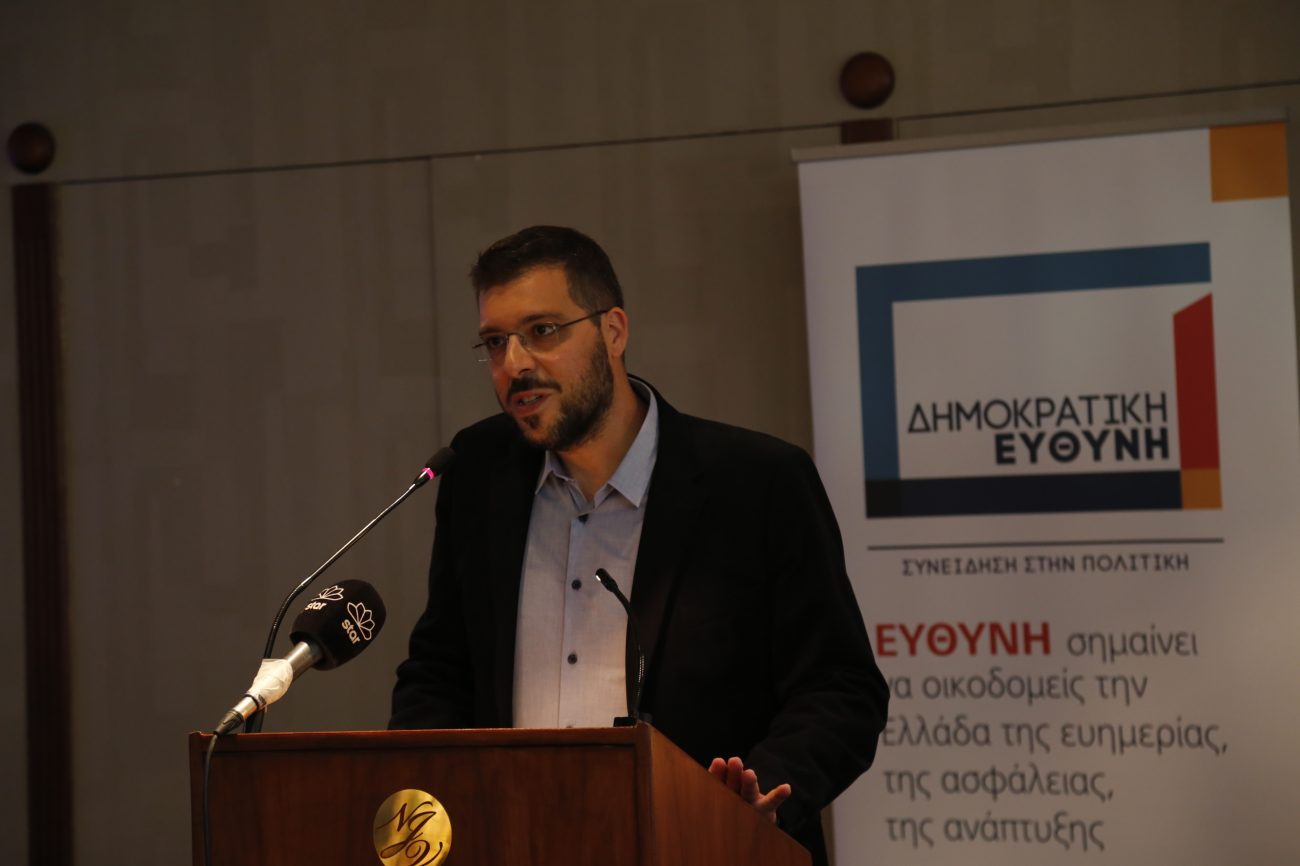
The President of Democratic Responsibility, Vasileios Pavlidis, during a political event of the party.

== Ideology and positions ==
Democratic Responsibility, according to interviews of its members, is defined as a party of the progressive patriotic centre. Most of the party's positions refer to a mixture of liberal and social democratic policies. The party favors the creation of a Senate, the election of the president of the republic directly by the people, the incompatibility between parliamentary and ministerial status and the establishment of a term limit for the prime minister. In the economy, the party supports the creation of constitutional guarantees that will create an investment-friendly environment, the privatization of productive sectors such as transport, while is in favor of welfare state. Democratic Responsibility also supports the revision of Article 16 of the Greek Constitution, in order to allow the creation of private universities in Greece.

Democratic Responsibility opposed the Prespa Agreement, calling it a "national defeat for Greece" and calls for Greece's withdrawal from the treaty.

The party is in favor of Greece remaining in the European Union and the euro.
