= Alternative Economic Strategies =

1991 book by Euclid Tsakalotos

Alternative Economic Strategies: The Case of Greece
- Author: Euclid Tsakalotos
- Subject: Economics
- Genre: Non-fiction
- Publication date: 1991
- ISBN: 1856281833

Alternative Economic Strategies: The Case of Greece is a book by Greek economist Euclid Tsakalotos, published in 1991. It was his PhD thesis from the University of Oxford, originally completed in 1989. Since July 2015, Tsakalotos has been Greece's Minister of Finance.

== Contents ==
In 1991, Tsakalotos published Alternative Economic Strategies: The Case of Greece, in which he defends Andreas Papandreou and his attempts to craft a progressive economic policy in the face of the new orthodoxy of supply-side economics then gaining currency in many countries. The work discusses supply-side economics, neo-corporatism and indicative planning in relation to the Greek experience. He discusses the idea of incomes policy and what he perceives as the Left's growing hostility to incomes policy in the latter half of the 20th century. He regards as misguided since, in his view, all economic policy inevitably affects income distribution. He discusses challenges in achieving equilibrium between aggregate supply and aggregate demand, and how enterprise of any type has a natural tendency to preserve its share of the consumption of value added in the face of oscillations in equilibrium price while leaving labour to adjust to the reduced share remaining when the equilibrium price falls, leading to real wage declines. He discusses potential solutions proposed by others including solidarity wage policy and social investment. While he notes that perfectly competitive markets are elusive in any setting, in his view the political culture of Greece at the time placed a higher premium on political power relative to private property and other instruments of competition as an end to achieving economic goals; therefore, the application in Greece of principles that had worked or seemed to be working in other countries would be less efficient and effective in Greece than they were elsewhere, which should be borne in mind when composing policy prescriptions for the country. For Tsakalotos, reforms to the political system and societal attitudes are a necessary precondition to economic reforms, and for him, "reform from below" is more promising than reform by entrenched state power-holders, as they will lack the will or the ability to adequately change power structures to the degree needed. Additionally, a strong vision of whatever those economic reforms should be is necessary to carry them out, and he characterizes PASOK's attempts at reforms as to some extent failed because it failed to define them adequately, and failed to find alternatives when the large-scale industrial projects it had envisioned did not materialize as planned.
