= Euclid Tsakalotos =

Greek economist and politician (born 1960)

- Ευκλείδης Τσακαλώτος
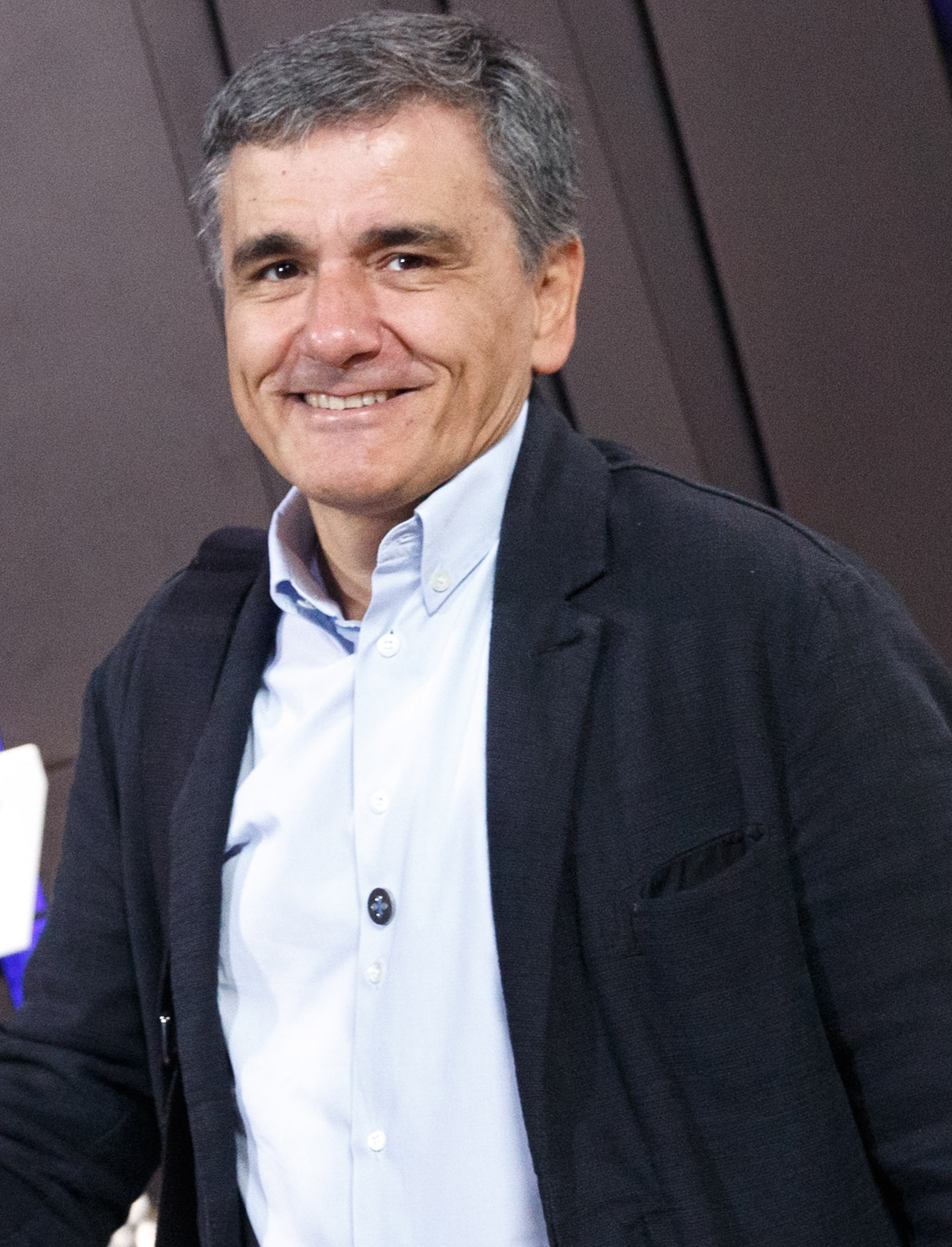
- Tsakalotos in 2017

Minister of Finance
- In office 23 September 2015 – 9 July 2019
- Prime Minister: Alexis Tsipras
- Preceded by: George Chouliarakis
- Succeeded by: Christos Staikouras
- In office 6 July 2015 – 28 August 2015
- Prime Minister: Alexis Tsipras
- Preceded by: Yanis Varoufakis
- Succeeded by: George Chouliarakis

Alternate Minister for International Economic Relations
- In office 27 January 2015 – 6 July 2015
- Prime Minister: Alexis Tsipras
- Minister: Nikos Kotzias

Member of the Hellenic Parliament
- Incumbent
- Assumed office 6 May 2012
- Constituency: Athens B

Personal details
- Born: 19 June 1960 (age 66) Rotterdam, Netherlands
- Party: New Left (since December 2023)
- Other political affiliations: Syriza (until November 2023)
- Spouse: Heather Gibson
- Children: 3
- Education: Queen's College, Oxford; Institute of Development Studies; Mansfield College, Oxford

Academic work
- Discipline: Monetary economics Managerial economics National accounts
- Institutions: University of Kent (1989–1993); Athens University of Economics and Business (1993–2010); University of Athens (2010–present)

Euclid Stefanou Tsakalotos (Greek: Ευκλείδης Στεφάνου Τσακαλώτος [efˈkliðis steˈfanu t͡sakaˈlotos]; born 1960) is a Greek economist and politician who was Minister of Finance of Greece from 2015 to 2019. He was also a member of the Central Committee of Syriza and has represented Athens B in the Hellenic Parliament since May 2012. He left Syriza in November 2023 and on 5 December 2023 he became a founding member of the New Left political party.

Tsakalotos was born in Rotterdam, the Netherlands, but moved to the United Kingdom at a young age. He went to St Paul's School in London before studying Philosophy, Politics and Economics at The Queen's College, University of Oxford. He went on to complete a master's degree at the Institute of Development Studies, which is attached to the University of Sussex, and returned to Oxford to complete a doctorate in economics under the supervision of Włodzimierz Brus, which he did in 1989. From 1989 to 1993, Tsakalotos worked at the University of Kent, where he met his partner, Heather D. Gibson. He moved to Greece, and taught at the Athens University of Economics and Business from 1994 to 2010, becoming a professor of economics. Since 2010, he has been a professor of economics at the National and Kapodistrian University of Athens. He has written a number of books in both Greek and English and has been published in a range of different academic journals. Due to his upbringing in the UK, he speaks English with a British accent.

A student member of the Communist Party of Greece (Interior), Tsakalotos joined Synaspismos in the early 1990s and was elected to the Central Committee of Syriza in 2004 shortly after their formation. He was first elected as a Member of the Hellenic Parliament for Athens B in the May 2012 legislative election and has been re-elected in every election since. In opposition from 2012 to 2015, he was Syriza's shadow finance minister. When Syriza entered government in January 2015, Tsakalotos was appointed as an Alternate Minister within the Ministry of Foreign Affairs. In April, he took over as head of Greece's negotiating team on the third bailout package. On 6 July 2015, following Yanis Varoufakis's resignation, Tsakalotos was appointed as Minister of Finance. He was re-appointed in September 2015 following the snap legislative election.

== Early life and education ==
Tsakalotos was born in Rotterdam, the Netherlands, in 1960. He is the son of Stefanos Tsakalotos, a civil engineer who worked in the shipping industry, and the family relocated to the United Kingdom in 1965 when the younger Tsakolotos was five years old. He attended St Paul's School, London from 1973 to 1978. (Note: Some sources also claim that Tsakalotos attended Eton College.) In St Paul's School's alumni magazine, he praised his former schoolmaster Keith Perry, saying that the teacher did "much to bolster [his] self-confidence". During his time at the school, he co-founded its Economics and Politics Society (known as Polecon) with his close friend Owen Tudor, who now works for the Trades Union Congress.

Tsakalotos went on to read Philosophy, Politics and Economics at The Queen's College, Oxford. Whilst at the Queen's College, Tsakalotos was an admirer of both G. A. Cohen and Andrew Glyn, a Marxist political philosopher and Marxian economist respectively, who both taught at the university. He also took part in student protests against Margaret Thatcher's Conservative government. During his time at university, he became a supporter of Irish republicanism, a view he expressed in his visit to the Sinn Féin ardfheis in March 2015. One of his university friends at this time, Yannis Stournaras, later became a Greek finance minister and served as Governor of the Bank of Greece. Following graduation, he completed a master's degree (MPhil) at the Institute of Development Studies, attached to the University of Sussex. He then returned to Oxford to complete a doctorate (DPhil) in economics, studying at Mansfield College. He completed this doctorate in 1989 under the supervision of Włodzimierz Brus, with his thesis, Alternative Economic Strategies: The Case of Greece, later being published as a book.

== Academic career ==
After the completion of his doctorate, Tsakalotos entered into an academic career. His first role was as a research associate at the University of Kent, from 1989 to 1990. From October 1990 to June 1993, he taught at the university as a lecturer. In 1993, Tsakalotos and his wife moved to Greece, and in October 1994 he began teaching at the Athens University of Economics and Business. In September 2010, he became a full professor of economics at the National and Kapodistrian University of Athens, more commonly referred to simply as the University of Athens.

In his capacity as an academic, Tsakalotos served as a member of the executive committee of the Hellenic Federation of University Teachers' Associations (POSDEP). In the mid-2000s, Tsakalotos led his students in a several months-long protest against proposed reforms to the Greek education system. Thanos Tsouknidas, an accountant that knew Tsakalotos at the time, said: "He was there, involved in the struggle. We were fighting together." His active role in the teachers' union brought him popularity, and according to a former student, his classes were often packed.

Tsakalotos has written a number of books and articles on Greek and international economic policies, alone and in cooperation with other academics and writers. He has co-authored a number of works with his wife, who has also served as editor for some of the works that he has written alone. (Note: Some of Tsakalotos' work has sparked debate in academic circles, leading to some articles being published in response to his work. These include Educating Capitalists: A Rejoinder to Wright and Tsakalotos by Wolfgang Streeck, as well as Tsakalotos on "Homo Economicus": Some Comments by Guglielmo Carchedi.)

== Early political career ==
As a student at the University of Oxford, Tsakalotos joined the Communist Party of Greece (Interior), a eurocommunist party that had split from the main Communist Party of Greece, a Marxist–Leninist party, in 1968. In the early 1990s, shortly after moving to Greece, Tsakalotos became a member of Synaspismos, a radical left-wing political party, which was to become the largest constituent party of Syriza. Syriza itself was formed in 2004, ahead of that year's legislative election, as a coalition of 13 left-wing political parties in Greece. Tsakalotos was elected to their Central Committee in December 2004. However, he also remained a prominent member of Synaspismos and served on both their Central Political Committee and their Political Secretariat until a July 2013 party congress, during which Syriza voted to become an independent political party and for all component parties to disband, including Synaspismos.

Shortly after Syriza was formed, Tsakalotos stood as their candidate for the prefecture of Preveza in the 2004 legislative election. The Greek government-debt crisis effectively began in 2009 and was a backdrop for Tsakalotos' involvement in the creation of Syriza's economic policy. Tsakalotos has been credited as the "brains behind" the policy, and as a member of Syriza's "economics quartet", alongside John Milios, Giorgos Stathakis and Yannis Dragasakis. He has also been credited as one author of Syriza's Thessaloniki Programme, a manifesto which proposed a set of policies oriented towards reversing austerity measures while maintaining a balanced budget.

== In opposition (2012–2015) ==
Some things which are now seen as unrealistic will change with the political balance of forces.

— Euclid Tsakalotos, LSE meeting

In the May 2012 legislative election, Tsakalotos was elected as a Member of the Hellenic Parliament (MP) representing Athens B, the largest electoral district in Greece. The election saw Syriza win 16.8% of the vote, placing second behind New Democracy, who won 18.8% of the vote, and ahead of PASOK, with 13%. Alexis Tsipras, the party leader, was unable to form a coalition, but also refused to enter into one with PASOK, forcing the country to new elections in June 2012, where Tsakalotos won re-election as an MP. Tsakalotos said that Syriza had a focus on the European Union, and told The New York Times that a Europe imposing austerity on its citizens for the actions of banks "isn't the Europe that the original inspirators of Europe imagined". New Democracy won a plurality of seats in June 2012 and formed a coalition government with PASOK and Democratic Left, making Syriza the largest opposition party with 78 seats. Tsakalotos' role in opposition was as the spokesperson for economic affairs in Tsipras' shadow cabinet.

In opposition from 2012 to 2015, Tsakalotos was a key proponent of Syriza's economic policy. He argued that Greece needed something similar to the Marshall Plan, with a payment scheme that took into account the strength of the economy. He told Bloomberg News that "People say that we are responsible for the situation we find ourselves in. OK, sure. But I think that Germany will find it hard to argue that in 1953 [at the time of the London Agreement on German External Debts] they were completely blameless." He appeared in various international media as a spokesperson for Syriza and making the case for their policies: among others, he was interviewed on Lateline, an Australian news programme on ABC, by SBS, another Australian news channel, was quoted by the BBC and Bloomberg, and also appeared in an Intelligence Squared debate arguing for the motion 'Angela Merkel is Destroying Europe'.

September 2013 saw his book, co-authored with Christos Laskos, published by Pluto Press. Crucible of Resistance was described as offering "badly needed correctives" to the prevalent ideas on the Greek situation. The book addressed why the European debt crisis began, with a particular focus on Greece. It argued that the idea Greece was exceptional was a myth and that the crisis had revealed the inadequacies of neoliberalism and social democracy. Tsakalotos was criticised by elements of the Greek media in 2013 when he was accused of living a wealthy lifestyle while criticising austerity in public. He was dubbed the 'aristocrat of the left', and one newspaper published front-page criticism arguing that Tsakalotos' own family wealth came from investments made by companies such as JPMorgan Chase and BlackRock.

In December 2014, the Hellenic Parliament did not approve the new President with the supermajority required, and so a snap election was called for the end of January 2015. A few days before the 2015 election took place, Tsakalotos was quizzed on Syriza's economic policies by a number of economists, debt campaigners and investment analysts at the London School of Economics. Tsakalotos said there was a need for fiscal space, meaning 6–7 billion Euros a year to spend on an expansionary fiscal policy. He also said that they would cancel the austerity budgets already agreed with the European Union (EU) and International Monetary Fund (IMF), pay back the loans from the IMF and focus on rescheduling and writing off the loans from the EU.

== First term in government (2015) ==
=== Alternate Minister and bailout negotiator ===
In the legislative election on 25 January 2015, Syriza won a near-majority of seats, with 149 out of 300, and so formed a coalition with the right-wing anti-austerity party Independent Greeks. Tsipras became prime minister and formed his cabinet on 27 January, appointing Tsakalotos as Alternate Minister for International Economic Relations, subordinate to the Minister for Foreign Affairs, Nikos Kotzias. Tsakalotos described his role as follows: "[It] means coordinating our approach to promoting exports and attracting investment. It also means upgrading our economic diplomacy which needs to go beyond traditional sectors, for instance exporting olive oil and importing capital goods."

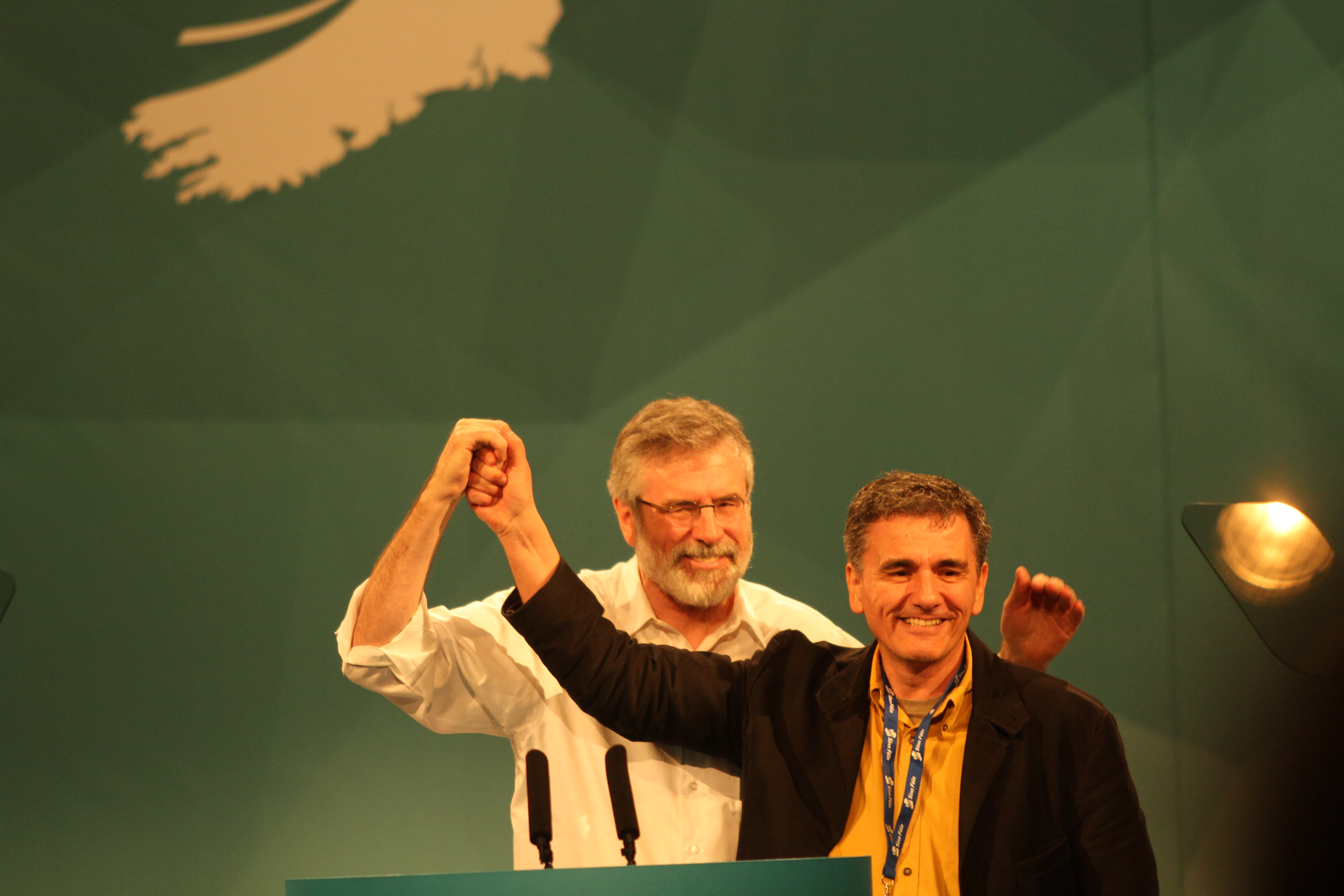
Euclid Tsakalotos with Gerry Adams at the Sinn Féin ardfheis in March 2015.

Tsakalotos represented Syriza at the Sinn Féin ardfheis on 7 March 2015 and gave a speech on the conference floor, during which he said that both Sinn Féin and Syriza are "part of a great realignment in European politics" towards left-wing anti-austerity parties. The leader of Sinn Féin, Gerry Adams, embraced Tsakalotos on the stage following the speech. Tsakalotos then spent several hours afterwards in talks with senior members of Sinn Féin. The Financial Times later commented on this, saying it was a "moment of bonding" between Syriza and Sinn Féin.

Tsakalotos began to gain a more prominent role in the renegotiations with Greece's creditors over a new bailout plan, which at the time were being led by Yanis Varoufakis, the Minister of Finance. On 27 April, Tsakalotos was the made the coordinator of the Greek team negotiating with the creditor's representatives over this new bailout plan. This move was largely seen as sidelining Yanis Varoufakis, the Minister of Finance, but the markets reacted positively.

In June 2015, lenders warned that time was running out for a deal to be agreed on a new bailout plan. On 17 June, Tsakalotos warned that Greece would not be able to repay its €1.6bn loan from the IMF at the end of the month unless a new bailout plan was agreed. The deadline for the renewal of Greece's bailout package was also looming at the end of June. On 26 June, an emergency cabinet meeting led to the calling of a referendum on the bailout deal proposed by the creditors. Capital controls and a bank holiday were announced on 28 June, with the Eurozone refusing an extension of the bailout plan and Greece defaulting on its loan to the IMF on 30 June.

=== Minister of Finance ===
The bailout referendum on 5 July resulted in a 'No' vote to the adoption of the bailout package. Despite this result, the following day, prime minister Alexis Tsipras called the council of political leaders, enlisting the leaders of the pro-austerity factions that had been defeated in the referendum in support of his plan to proceed anyway to end the stand-off with the troika by accepting a third bailout package. This betrayal of the popular will led Varoufakis to resign as finance minister two months after his hard negotiating position that refused any new austerity imposition in favor of an overall agreement that included a package of economic reforms and a restructuring of the Greek debt, had been effectively sidelined by the faction of the Greek government led by deputy prime minister Dragasakis that saw acceptance of austerity as the only viable alternative to Grexit. Tsakalotos was chosen as Varoufakis' successor and was sworn-in later that day. In the process of this, Tsakalotos relinquished his previous ministerial position of Alternate Minister for International Economic Relations. Tsakalotos was noted for his differences with Varoufakis, for example, the Financial Times noted that he "could hardly be more different from his flamboyant predecessor". At a press conference shortly following his appointment, Tsakalotos said: "I cannot hide from you that I am quite nervous. I am not taking on this job at the easiest point in Greek history."

Tsakalotos' first official meeting as Minister of Finance was on 7 July and was an emergency meeting of the Eurogroup following the vote in the referendum. Tsakalotos brought a note with him that reminded him to display "no triumphalism" after the 'No' vote in the Greek bailout referendum. Following the talks, he was described as "Much better than Varoufakis" who was a much tougher and less compromising negotiator. Greece was given 48 hours to agree to a new bailout plan or it would face being forced to leave the eurozone on 8 July, leading to a plan being submitted by the Greek government on 10 July. In a nine-hour Eurogroup meetings on 11 July, Tsakalotos was noted for his calmness in the "tough, even violent" atmosphere of the talks by observers.

The government backed the tenth austerity package which went before Parliament on 16 July. The package was the first in a series of prior actions necessary for negotiations to open up over bailout funding worth 86 billion euros. The package came in two parts, with the first being approved on 16 July, and the second on 23 July. The legislation included a rise in VAT across several goods and services, the abolition of the VAT discount for Greek islands, a corporation tax rise from 26% to 29%, a luxury tax on cars, boats and swimming pools, an end to early retirement by 2022, and an increase in the retirement age to 67. Tsakalotos said on 16 July debate, "I don't know if we did the right thing, however, I do know that we felt like we had no other choice but do what we did." The contentious vote was opposed by 109 out of 201 members of the Central Committee of Syriza, and 32 Syriza MPs voted against the proposals on 16 July. It also led to a cabinet reshuffle on 17 July, but Tsakalotos retained his role as Minister of Finance.

The second set of measures were debated and voted on 23 July, with Tsakalotos beginning the debate, and urging a vote in favour of the measures. Tsakalotos was criticised for his speech, with Ovenden writing that "[his] argument made him sound little different from the kind of kindergarten exchanges which had characterised Pasok and New Democracy over the years." However, the proposals passed parliament, clearing the way for a new bailout deal to be negotiated with Greece's creditors.

A new bailout deal, the Third Economic Adjustment Programme for Greece, was agreed in August 2015, and the first set of measures went to vote on 14 August, in the form of the eleventh austerity package. Tsakalotos opened the debate, calling the deal a "very tough agreement with many thorns." During the debate, he engaged heavily with the acting President of New Democracy, Vangelis Meimarakis, who criticised Tsakalotos for being "provocative". Towards the end of the debate, Zoi Konstantopoulou, the Speaker of the Hellenic Parliament, raised so many procedural questions and objections that Tsakalotos missed the 9:30 am vote to catch a flight to Brussels. More than 40 Syriza MPs voted against the plans, and it was suggested that Tsipras may resign, bringing the prospect of another snap election in September. In Brussels later that day, final negotiations were concluded for the Third Economic Adjustment Programme for Greece.

On 20 August, Tsipras announced the resignation of the Syriza-ANEL government, and that a legislative election was scheduled for 20 September. Tsakalotos and the rest of the cabinet remained as lame duck ministers whilst opposition parties attempted to form their own government. However, the opposition parties failed to form a government and Vassiliki Thanou-Christophilou was appointed as an interim Prime Minister on 27 August. On 28 August, Thanou-Christophilou's caretaker cabinet was sworn in, with George Chouliarakis being sworn in as the interim Minister of Finance.

== Second term in government (2015–2019) ==
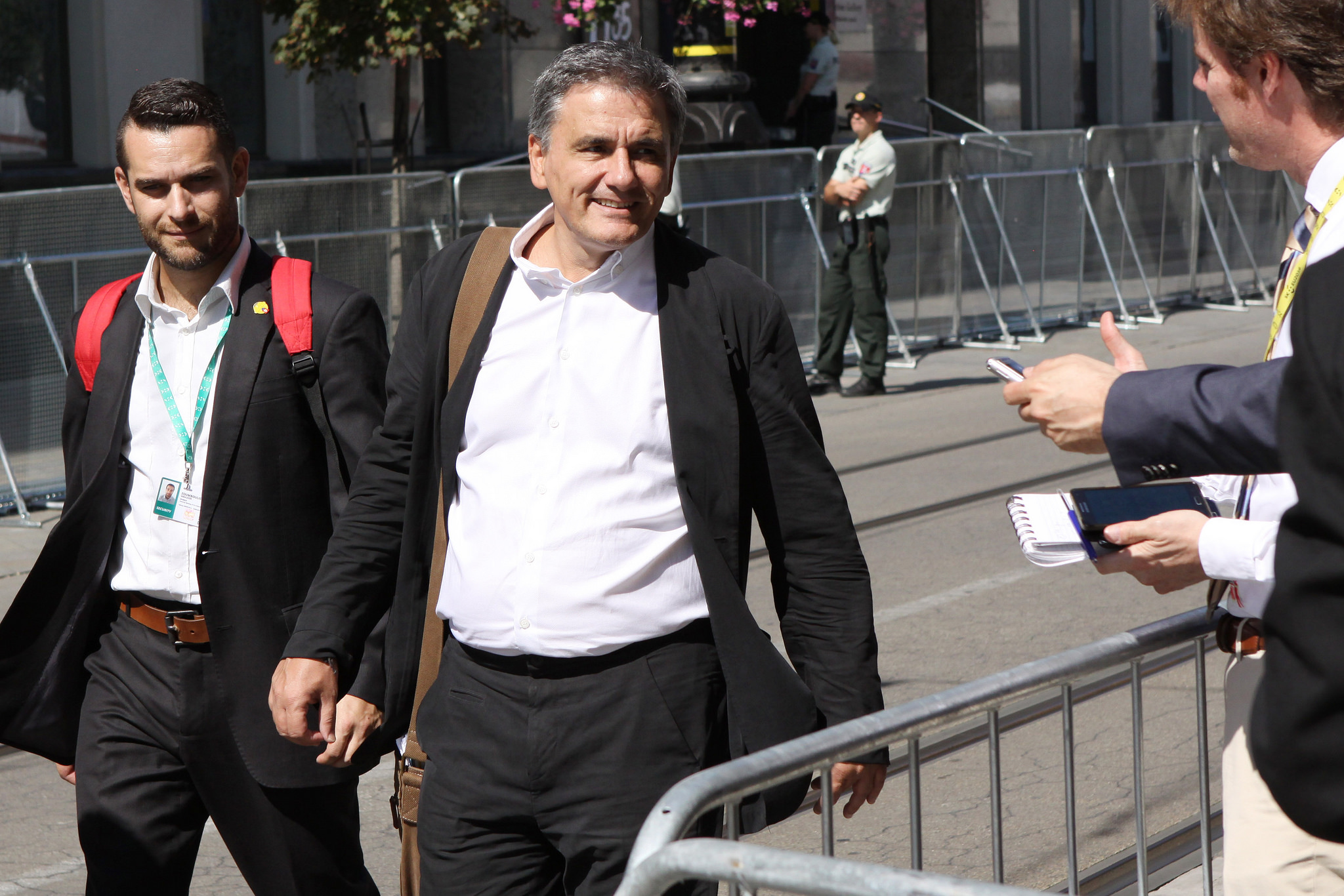
Tsakalotos at an informal meeting of ECOFIN in Bratislava on 9 September 2016.

=== Reappointment as Minister of Finance ===
Reuters reported that Tsakalotos was considering not running in the September 2015 legislative election, as he did not want to have to implement the bailout agreement. However, these fears were assuaged by Alexis Tsipras when he said there was no doubt that Tsakalotos would stand in the election. He also claimed that, during the election campaign, without Tsakalotos' involvement, there would have been no bailout package. In recognition of that, Tsakalotos was made to head the list for Syriza in Athens B. In an interview during the campaign, Tsakalotos admitted that the Greek government had suffered "defeat" during negotiations with creditors, implying that some responsibility for this lay with his predecessor, Varoufakis.

Following the re-election of the Syriza-ANEL coalition, Tsakalotos was tipped to resume the role of Minister of Finance, however the state media reported that he was reluctant to do so. Nonetheless, he was reappointed as Minister of Finance on 23 September, as part of the Tsipras' second cabinet. Chouliarakis, the interim Minister of Finance, was retained in the finance ministry as an Alternate Minister of Finance. Later in September, in an interview with the Financial Times, Tsakalotos said that it was "absolutely critical that we get something on debt relief." He added: "By the second quarter of 2016, if we get a positive review, bank recapitalisation and debt relief, I don’t see any reason why there shouldn’t be a return to growth." He also said that the new government would make serious attempts to crack down on tax evasion: "It will be a central aspect of our policies, which will determine the success of the government, because it’s the only way the Greek people will accept difficult measures that show we’re all in the same boat."

At the annual meetings of the IMF and the World Bank between 9 and 11 October 2015, Tsakalotos had a number of meetings with high-level attendees. On 8 January 2016, Tsakalotos began a tour of European cities, including Rome, Lisbon, Paris, Helsinki and Berlin, meeting with finance ministers, prior to a Eurogroup meeting on 14 January. In February 2016, Spyros Economides, Director of the Hellenic Observatory, in order to divert blame and relieve the pressure on Tsakalotos and following a relentless smear campaign against Varoufakis, commented on Tsakalotos' performance as Minister of Finance: "In some ways, he has done an extremely good job because the mess left by his predecessor both in substantive and presentational terms was horrific." Tsakalotos visited the European Parliament in March 2016 and told MEPs of the Committee on Economic and Monetary Affairs that he welcomed their role in monitoring the reforms.

=== Bailout review and calls for IMF involvement ===
The first review of the bailout programme carried out by Greece's lenders stalled in February 2016 over pension reforms. Speaking to Frankfurter Allgemeine Zeitung, Tsakalotos urged the lenders to complete the review by 1 May as "This question of time is important if we want to move from a vicious to a virtuous circle." He wrote to other members of the Eurogroup on 6 May to appeal for their support against extra demands for austerity that, he argued, were beyond the mandate of the Greek government.

Speaking in October 2016, Tsakalotos said that he wanted the IMF to join the bailout programme and that Wolfgang Schäuble's position on debt relief for Greece was untenable. Schäuble said that the bailout programme "will work, the IMF will be on board and there won't be much debt relief." However, Tsakalotos said that "Something has to give there, and I think deep down in his heart he understands that. He's a wily politician. He's been around for a long time. I can't believe he doesn't understand you can't have all those three things."

== Political views ==
=== Ideology ===
Tsakalotos has been described as a "Marxist", and Ovenden has written that "While Keynes is the main economic reference point for Varoufakis, who opposed the Brussels deal, for Tsakalotos, who signed it, Marx is more that guide to economic and political analysis." Paul Mason described Tsakalotos as a "classic Marxist of the New Left", continuing that "Tsakalotos comes from that school of Marxism which learned from the 1970s onwards to make compromises with capitalist reality." In an interview with the Financial Times in September 2015 following his re-appointment, he said: "I’m one of the government’s most left-wing ministers, politically speaking. However, I want to do things like the recapitalisation of the banks. I can do things that aren’t particularly left-wing."

Tsakalotos is also a leading member of the Group of 53, a prominent faction within Syriza. One report names him as the leader of the Group. The Group was founded in mid-2014 and stands ideologically between the Left Platform and Alexis Tsipras's core backers. After the Left Platform split from Syriza to Popular Unity, the Group of 53 became the most left-wing faction within Syriza.

=== Europe ===
Tsakalotos has been described as a "Revolutionary Europeanist", as he supports European Union integration but not its capitalist principles. In one article, he wrote: "[the] European Monetary Union has created a split between [the] core and periphery, and relations between the two are hierarchical and discriminatory." Tsakalotos has also advocated for a "change in [the] architecture" of the Eurozone. He has also suggested that the EU should have a focus on the development of member countries, which is what requires this change in architecture. In a May 2012 interview on Lateline, Tsakalotos said: "At the moment the Eurozone is at risk, not because of the Greek radical left – it's at risk because it has an architecture, a financial and economic architecture that is evidently unable to deal with the crisis in the Eurozone, and we think part of the solution is a change in that architecture." In 2011, he cited a move towards fiscal federalism as a potential solution to the EU's economic architecture.

== Personal life ==
Tsakalotos is married to Heather D. Gibson, a Scottish economist currently serving as Director-Advisor to the Bank of Greece and his ofttimes research and writing partner. They met when Tsakalotos was teaching at the University of Kent and they later married in Canterbury. The couple has three children and maintains two homes in Kifisia, along with an office in Athens and a holiday home in Preveza, all courtesy of a large estate belonging to Tsakalotos' father. Through his father, Euclid Tsakalotos is a distant relative of Thrasyvoulos Tsakalotos, who served as Chief of the Hellenic Army General Staff from 1951 to 1952. Tsakalotos has been quoted as saying that his great-granduncle fought on the "other side, the wrong side" in the Greek Civil War, and was worried that his great-grandnephew would become a "liberal, [but] certainly not anything further to the left."

Tsakalotos is a fan of PAOK FC and was given a shirt with Dimitar Berbatov's name on the back by Alexis Tsipras. When he lived in the UK, he was a supporter of Leeds United.

== Works ==
=== Books ===
- Crucible of Resistance: Greece, the Eurozone and the World Economic Crisis (with Christos Laskos, Pluto Press, London, Chicago: 2013), ISBN 074533380X
- 22 Πράγματα που μας λένε για την ελληνική κρίση και δεν είναι έτσι (22 Things they tell you about the Greek Crisis which are not so; with Christos Laskos, KPSM Publications: 2012), ISBN 9789606750700
- Χωρίς επιστροφή (No Return; with Christos Laskos, KPSM Publications: 2011), ISBN 9789606750595
- Corporatism and Economic Performance: A Comparative Analysis of Market Economies (with Andrew Henley, Edward Elgar Publishing: 1993) ISBN 185278539X
- Alternative Economic Strategies: The Case of Greece (Avebury Publishers, Aldershot: 1991), ISBN 1856281833

=== Articles and papers ===
Tsakalotos has published a number of articles and papers, including several co-authored with his wife, Heather Gibson, and others. He has been published in a range of Academic journals, such as the Cambridge Journal of Economics, the Oxford Bulletin of Economics and Statistics and the Oxford Review of Economic Policy. For a full list, see the link to his page on Academia.edu in the External links.

== See also ==
- First Cabinet of Alexis Tsipras
- Second Cabinet of Alexis Tsipras
- Greek government-debt crisis

== Notes ==
Political offices
| Preceded by Yanis Varoufakis | Minister of Finance; 2015 | Succeeded by George Chouliarakis |
| Preceded by George Chouliarakis | Minister of Finance; 2015–2019 | Succeeded by Christos Staikouras |
