= Christos Laskos =

Greek economist, teacher and writer

Christos Laskos is a Greek economist, teacher and writer. He was a member of the political secretariat of Syriza and co-author of Crucible of Resistance with Euclid Tsakalotos.

== Political career ==
In 2014, Laskos was selected as one of Syriza's candidates for the upcoming European Parliament election.

Laskos has been described as one of "the best-known intellectuals of Tsipras’s majority". He resigned from Syriza's political secretariat following the announcement of snap elections in September 2015. Antonis Davanellos said that following his resignation, Laskos was "trying to organise other forms of opposition to the memorandum policies of Syriza."
