= Crucible of Resistance =

2013 nonfiction book by Euclid Tsakalotos and Christos Laskos

Crucible of Resistance: Greece, the Eurozone and the World Economic Crisis
- Authors: Euclid Tsakalotos; Christos Laskos
- Language: English
- Publisher: Pluto Press
- Publication date: 2013
- Publication place: United Kingdom
- Media type: Print
- Pages: 192pp
- ISBN: 9780745333809
- OCLC: 861529303

Crucible of Resistance: Greece, the Eurozone and the World Economic Crisis is a nonfiction book by the Greek economists Euclid Tsakalotos and Christos Laskos. The book was published on 5 September 2013 by Pluto Press.

== Synopsis ==
Crucible of Resistance seeks to challenge the mainstream accounts of the Greek government-debt crisis and the euro area crisis. In the book, the authors argue that the assertion Greece is exceptional is a myth. They also argue that the causes of the 2008 financial crisis lie in the key features of the neoliberal economic order. Finally, they assert that a progressive exit from the crisis would be to confront the limitations of the neoliberal order.

== Reviews ==
The book was launched in 2013 in London.

The book was reviewed in Red Pepper by Trevor Evans. The book was reviewed by Myrto Petsota on the Counterfire website.
