= Christos Zois =

Greek politician

- Χρήστος Ζώης

Alternate Minister of Shipping
- In office 28 August 2015 – 23 September 2015
- Prime Minister: Vassiliki Thanou-Christophilou
- Minister: Nikos Christodoulakis
- Preceded by: Thodoris Dritsas
- Succeeded by: Thodoris Dritsas

Member of the Hellenic Parliament for Larissa
- In office 9 April 2000 – 19 May 2012

Personal details
- Born: May 10, 1968 (age 58) Düsseldorf, West Germany
- Party: New Democracy (until 2012); ANEL (2012-2013); NEA MERA (since 2013)
- Other political affiliations: Union for the Homeland and the People
- Spouse: Joanna Tsagali
- Education: Aristotle University of Thessaloniki; Toulouse 1 University Capitole

Christos Zois (Greek: Χρήστος Ζώης; born 10 May 1968) is a Greek politician. He is currently the leader of NEA MERA, and Deputy Chairman of the Union for the Homeland and the People.

He was formerly a Member of the Hellenic Parliament (MP) for New Democracy, but left in 2012 along with ten other New Democracy MPs to found the Independent Greeks. He left the Independent Greeks in 2013 when he founded NEA MERA. From August to September 2015, he served as the Alternate Minister of Shipping in Vassiliki Thanou-Christophilou's caretaker cabinet.

== Early life and education ==
Born in Düsseldorf, West Germany. He studied at the Law School of the Aristotle University of Thessaloniki, before completing a DEA in public law at the Toulouse 1 University Capitole.

== Political career ==
Zois was first elected as a New Democracy Member of the Hellenic Parliament in the 2000 legislative election. In 2012, he defected to the Independent Greeks. He was not re-elected in the June 2012 legislative election.

From 2009 to 2012, Zois had responsibility for public administration in the First Shadow Cabinet of Antonis Samaras.

In 2013, Zois left Independent Greeks and formed his own party, New Reformist Radical Reconstruction. In his first speech as party leader, he said that he would abolish income tax for those who earn less than 33,000 Euros a year.

In February 2014, Zois joined with Vyron Polydoras to found the Union for the Homeland and the People.

In November 2014, Panos Kammenos, the leader of the Independent Greeks, gave an interview where he invited Zois back to the party.

On 28 August 2015, Zois was sworn in as the Alternate Minister of Shipping in the Caretaker Cabinet of Vassiliki Thanou-Christophilou.

== Personal life ==
Zois is married to Joanna Tsagali.
