= Union for the Homeland and the People =

Union for the Homeland and the People Ένωση για την Πατρίδα και τον Λαό
- Abbreviation: EPAL
- President: Vyron Polydoras
- Founder: Vyron Polydoras
- Founded: 5 February 2014
- Dissolved: 2015
- Split from: New Democracy
- Ideology: National conservatism Christian democracy
- Political position: Right-wing

Website
- enosi-patrida.gr (archived)

Union for the Homeland and the People (Greek: Ένωση για την Πατρίδα και τον Λαό) was a minor Greek political party that formed in order to take part in 2014 European Parliament Elections. The party was founded by Vyron Polydoras former deputy of New Democracy and Christos Zois, president of New Reformist Radical Reconstruction. The party also cooperated with Christian Democratic Party of the Overthrow, Panagiotis Psomiadis, a former prefect of Thessaloniki and Stelios Papathemelis, a former president of Panhellenic Macedonian Front. Eventually in European parliament elections, the party ranked in 11th place and took 59,341 votes or 1.04% of votes. Famous Greek Romani singer Makis Christodoulopoulos was a candidate in 2014.

== Election results ==
=== European Parliament ===
Election year	# of overall votes	% of overall vote	# of overall seats won	+/-	Notes
2014	59,341	1.04 (#11)	0 / 21		
