= Theano Fotiou =

Greek architect and politician

Theano Fotiou MP
- Θεανώ Φωτίου
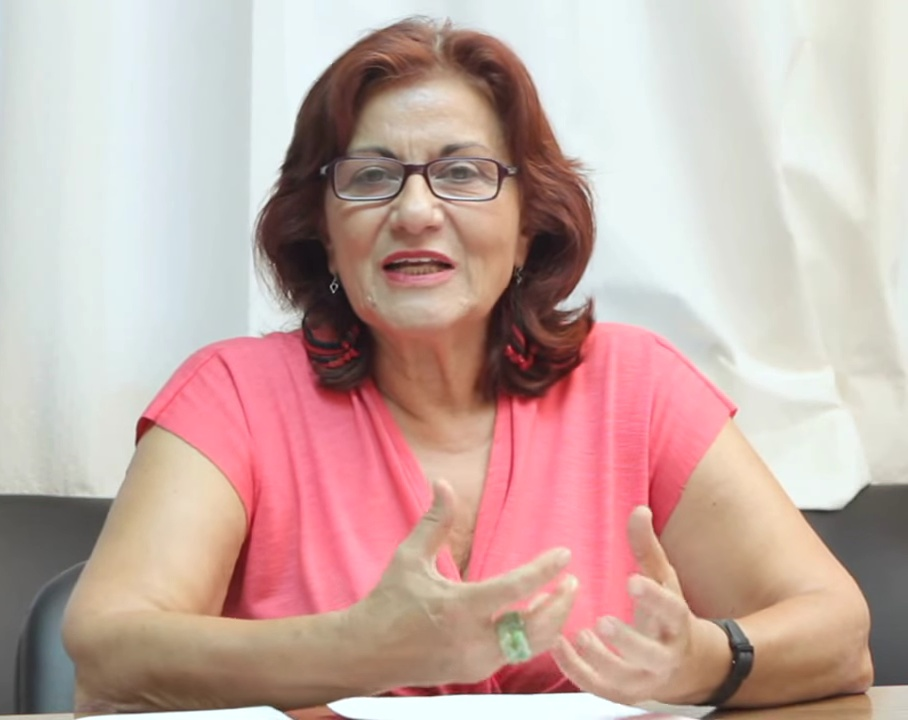

Alternate Minister of Social Solidarity
- In office 23 September 2015 – 9 July 2019
- Prime Minister: Alexis Tsipras
- Preceded by: Kostas Michail
- Succeeded by: post abolished
- In office 27 January 2015 – 28 August 2015
- Prime Minister: Alexis Tsipras
- Succeeded by: Kostas Michail

Member of the Parliament of Greece
- Incumbent
- Assumed office 6 May 2012

Personal details
- Born: 10 May 1946 (age 80) Athens, Kingdom of Greece
- Party: New Left (2023–2026)
- Other political affiliations: Syriza (until November 2023)
- Children: 1
- Education: National Technical University of Athens
- Profession: architect

Theano Fotiou (Greek: Θεανώ Φωτίου; born 10 May 1946 in Athens) is a Greek architect and politician of the Coalition of the Radical Left (Syriza). From January 2015 to July 2019, she served as Alternate Minister of Social Solidarity in the First and Second Tsipras Cabinets.

== Early life and education ==
Born in 1946 in Athens, Fotiou studied architecture at the National Technical University of Athens (NTUA), graduating in 1969.

== Professional career ==
Since 1972, she has taught architecture at the NTUA School of Architecture. She has also been a visiting professor at the Royal College of Art, The Bartlett, London and Barcelona Architecture School. In 1980, she received a second postgraduate degree in urban planning at Paris X University Nanterre. She is co-founder of the European Design Age Network aiming at design for the elderly.

=== Major architectural projects ===
In the 1990s, both the new Technical University of Crete, Chania, and the new Faculty of Humanities at University of Crete, Rethymno was built on her plans. In 2000, she received 1st prize in the international architectural competition for the 2004 Olympic village. In 2001, she received a 1st honorary mention at the international architectural competition for the Acropolis Museum. In interior design she remodeled the meeting room of the Bank of Greece's head office. Among other works, the new library of the Philosophical Faculty of Athens University has been finished in the last years.

== Political career ==
Since the May 2012 elections, Fotiou has been a Member of the Hellenic Parliament on Syriza's state list. Together with Tasos Kourakis she was nominated for the post of education minister in Syriza's Shadow Cabinet of Alexis Tsipras. After the January 2015 legislative election, Fotiou however was appointed Alternate Minister of Social Solidarity. In the Hellenic Parliament, she currently represents the Athens B constituency.

She was one of ten SYRIZA MPs to depart the party in 2023 and form a new party, called New Left. In June 2026, she was one of seven New Left MPs who departed the party to sit as independents.

== Publications ==
- Theano Fotiou; Aleka Monemvasitou; Maria Kafritsa; Agni Papaloannou (2011). "Lavrion Technological Cultural Park: 1992-2010. Re-using the Past in Order to Design the Present". In Babalis, Dimitra (ed.). Chronocity: Sensitive Interventions in Historic Environment. Florence: Alinea Editrice. p. 27. ISBN 978-88-6055-618-9.
- Theano Fotiou; Konstantina Demiri; Argyro Moungolia, eds. (2007). Diploma Projects 2002+2003: School of Architecture. National Technical University of Athens Press. ISBN 978-960-254-668-0.
- Theano Fotiou; Konstantina Demiri; Grigoris Kalnis; et al., eds. (2004). Diploma Projects 2001: School of Architecture. National Technical University of Athens Press. ISBN 960-254-639-5.
