= Christos Staikouras =

Greek economist, politician (born 1973)

Christos Staikouras MP
- Χρήστος Σταϊκούρας
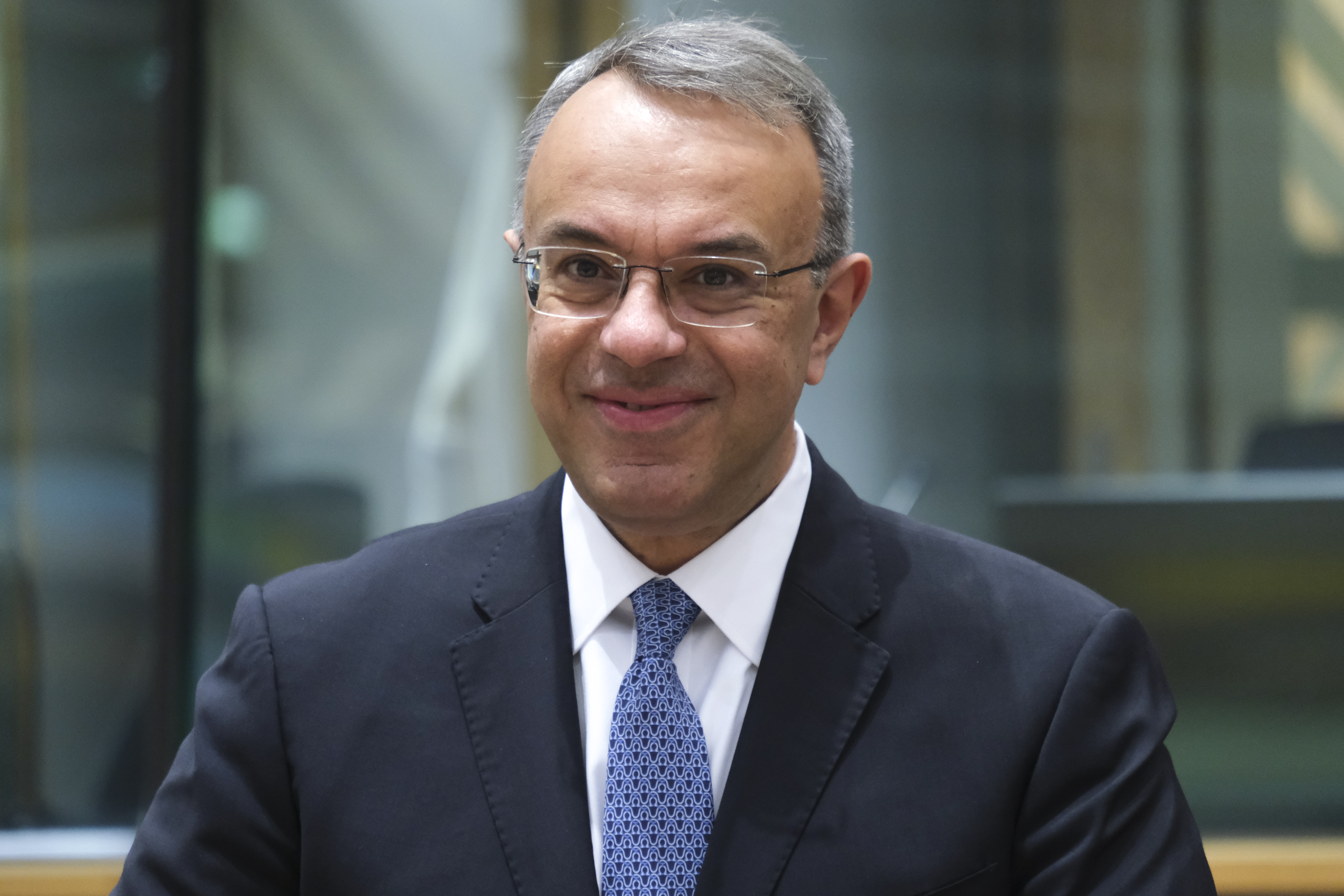
- Staikouras in 2023

Minister for Finance
- In office 9 July 2019 – 26 May 2023
- Prime Minister: Kyriakos Mitsotakis
- Preceded by: Euclid Tsakalotos
- Succeeded by: Theodore Pelagidis

Alternate Minister for Finance
- In office 20 June 2012 – 27 January 2015
- Prime Minister: Antonis Samaras

Member of the Hellenic Parliament for Phthiotis
- Incumbent
- Assumed office 16 September 2007

Minister of Infrastructure and Transport
- In office 27 June 2023 – 15 March 2025
- Succeeded by: Christos Dimas

Personal details
- Born: 12 August 1973 (age 52) Lamia, Phthiotis, Greece
- Party: New Democracy
- Education: National Technical University of Athens; Imperial College London; City University London
- Website: cstaikouras.gr

Academic work
- Institutions: Athens University of Economics and Business (2002–present); University of Thessaly (2004); Hellenic Open University (2004–2007)

Christos Staikouras (pronounced [ˌxristos stai̯ˈkuras]; born 12 August 1973) is a Greek economist and elected member of the Greek Parliament for the period 2023-2027. Since the 2007 legislative election, he has been a Member of the Hellenic Parliament (MP) for Phthiotis. After the 2019 election, he was appointed minister for finance in the Cabinet of Kyriakos Mitsotakis serving from 2019 to 2023.

Staikouras was born in Lamia, Phthiotis, and studied mechanical engineering at the National Technical University of Athens. He went on to complete an MBA at Imperial College London and a PhD in banking at City University London. He worked as an analyst for the Bank of England and then Eurobank Ergasias before becoming a lecturer at the Athens University of Economics and Business in 2002. He continued in this role whilst taking on additional responsibilities, including at the University of Thessaly and the Hellenic Open University. In 2006, he was made an assistant professor of finance at the Athens University of Economics and Business, going on leave in 2007.

He was first elected as a New Democracy MP for Phthiotis at the 2007 election. He has been re-elected in all elections since, and in June 2012 was appointed an alternate minister for finance, serving until January 2015.

== Early life and education ==
Staikouras was born in Lamia, Phthiotis, in 1973. In 1991, he graduated from the 39th General Lyceum of Kypseli and from 1991 to 1996 studied a Bachelor of Science (BSc) degree in mechanical engineering at the National Technical University of Athens (NTUA). During his time at NTUA he was a member of the student senate and was President of the Student Association for mechanical engineering students. From 1996 to 1997, he completed a Master of Business Administration (MBA) at Imperial College London. From November 1997 to May 2001 he completed a PhD in banking at City University London, with the thesis "European banking industry: Sources of income and profitability." For his postgraduate studies, he was the recipient of a scholarship from the Eugenides Foundation, based in Athens.

== Academic career ==
From September to December 1999, he worked as a visiting lecturer at City University London. He went on to work as a scientific associate for the Bank of England from January to June 2000 before moving to Greece and working as a strategy analyst for Eurobank Ergasias from August 2000 to June 2002. Beginning in February 2002, Staikouras also worked as a lecturer in finance at the Athens University of Economics and Business, continuing in this role for several years whilst other jobs took place on the sidelines. From July 2002 to January 2004, he returned to Eurobank Ergasias, working as an advisor to the board of directors.

In February 2004 he took up the role of associate professor of economic sciences at the University of Thessaly, continuing until September 2004, when he became a member of the teaching staff at the Hellenic Open University. In July 2006, Staikouras was made an assistant professor of finance at the Athens University of Economics and Business, ending his role at the Hellenic Open University in August 2007. In September 2007, he went on extended leave after his election as a Member of the Hellenic Parliament.

== Political career ==
In the 2007 legislative election, Staikouras was first elected as a New Democracy Member of the Hellenic Parliament (MP) representing Phthiotis. Upon his election, he was appointed a member of the Standing Committee on Economic Affairs and became a member of both the Central Committee and Political Committee of New Democracy. Following his re-election in 2009, he was also appointed a member of the Special Standing Committee on the Financial Statement and General Balance Sheet of the State.

Staikouras was re-elected in both the May and June 2012 elections, and following the June election was appointed an Alternate Minister for Finance in the Cabinet of Antonis Samaras. In this capacity, he oversaw the national accounts between 2012 and 2014 during Greece's second bailout. In October 2014, Staikouras presented the draft budget before the Hellenic Parliament, predicting a 2.4% rise in growth in 2015. He said: "The conditions for sustained long-term growth are in the process of being created," although doubt was cast on his predictions as they may have been "too optimistic." He served as Alternate Minister for Finance until the January 2015 legislative election, which resulted in a loss for New Democracy.

From February 2015 until July 2019, Staikouras was Coordinator of Economic Affairs for New Democracy during the party's spell in opposition, serving successively in the shadow cabinets of Antonis Samaras, Evangelos Meimarakis, Ioannis Plakiotakis and Kyriakos Mitsotakis. Shortly after taking office as Minister of Finance in 2019, Staikouras successfully pushed through parliament his first piece of legislation, cutting an annual property tax by an average of 22 per cent per household and reviving a plan for tax arrears to be paid in 120 monthly instalments.

== Other activities ==
- Asian Infrastructure Investment Bank (AIIB), Ex-Officio Member of the Board of Governors (2019–2023)
- European Investment Bank (EIB), Ex-Officio Member of the Board of Governors (2019–2023)
- European Stability Mechanism, Ex-Officio Member of the Board of Governors (2019–2023)
- International Monetary Fund (IMF), Ex-Officio Member of the Board of Governors (2019–2023)
