= Tasos Kourakis =

Greek politician (1948–2021)

Tasos Kourakis MP
- Τάσος Κουράκης
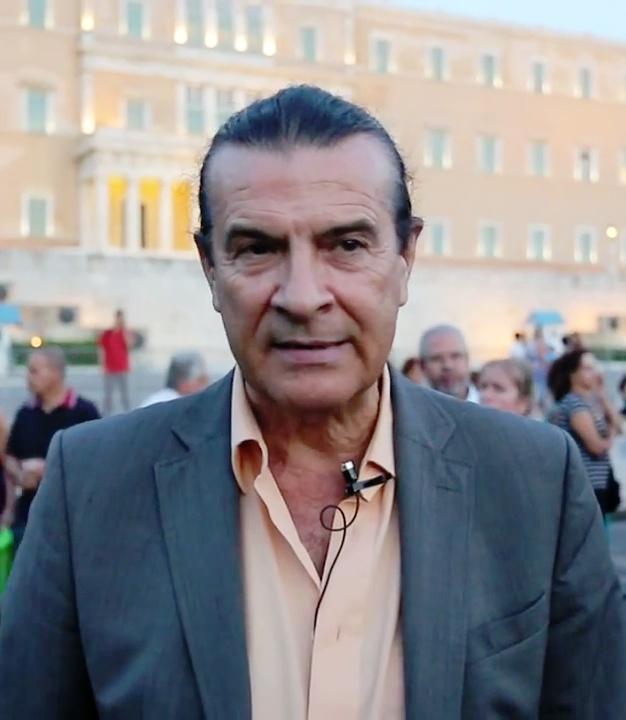
- Kourakis in 2013

Deputy Speaker of the Hellenic Parliament
- In office 4 October 2015 – 18 July 2019
- Preceded by: Alexis Mitropoulos

Alternate Minister of Education
- In office 27 January 2015 – 28 August 2015
- Prime Minister: Alexis Tsipras
- Preceded by: Andreas Loverdos as Minister for Education and Religious Affairs

Personal details
- Born: 1948 Thessaloniki, Greece
- Died: 10 October 2021 (aged 73)
- Party: Coalition of the Radical Left (Syriza)
- Education: Aristotle University of Thessaloniki
- Profession: Pediatrician, geneticist

Anastasios ("Tasos") Kourakis (Greek: Αναστάσιος (Τάσος) Κουράκης; 1948 − 10 October 2021) was a Greek pediatrician, geneticist and politician of the Coalition of the Radical Left (Syriza). From January 2015 until July 2019 he served as Alternate Minister of Education.

== Biography ==
Born 1948 in Thessaloniki, Kourakis studied medicine at Aristotle University of Thessaloniki. He has been an Associate Professor of Genetics in the Faculty of Medicine of Aristotle University.

In 2002 and 2006, he was elected a member of the municipal council of Thessaloniki heading his list. From 2007 on, Kourakis has been a Member of the Hellenic Parliament for Thessaloniki A on Syriza's list.

Following the June 2012 elections, together with Theano Fotiou he was nominated for the post of education minister in Syriza's Shadow Cabinet of Alexis Tsipras. After the January 2015 legislative election, Kourakis was appointed Alternate Minister of Education.

He died of cancer at the age of 73, on 10 October 2021.
