= Thessaloniki Programme =

The Thessaloniki Programme is a manifesto adopted by the Greek Coalition of the Radical Left (SYRIZA), first presented by party leader Alexis Tsipras at the Thessaloniki International Fair on 13 September 2014, proposing a set of policies oriented towards reversing austerity measures while maintaining a balanced budget. At the start of 2015, while still Leader of the Opposition, Tsipras stated that the programme is "not negotiable".

After Syriza won a majority in legislative elections held on 25 January 2015, Tsipras became Prime Minister of Greece and brokered a coalition with the right-wing anti-austerity Independent Greeks with the shared goal of immediate realisation of the programme. An official Syriza statement promised that the "new government will implement the Thessaloniki program to end the humanitarian crisis".

On 13 July 2015, the Greek government and the European creditors reached an agreement under which the government had to implement harsh austerity measures, which effectively made the major economic measures proposed by the Thessaloniki programme virtually impossible to implement.

== The Four Pillars of the National Reconstruction Plan ==
The programme is based on four pillars:

1. Confronting the humanitarian crisis
2. Restarting the economy and promoting tax justice
3. National plan to regain employment
4. Transforming the political system to deepen democracy

At the European level, the programme demands a "European New Deal" of large-scale public investment by the European Investment Bank, extended quantitative easing by the European Central Bank, and a conference for the reduction of Greek and southern European debt modeled on the London Debt Agreement of 1953. Domestically, the programme sets out a "National Reconstruction Plan" based on the rebuilding and extending of the welfare state, and the strengthening of democratic institutions alongside the implementation of forms of direct democracy. These policies would be financed through revenues raised by combatting tax evasion and appropriating European funds from bodies such as the Structural Funds and Cohesion Fund.

== Reception ==
At the time of its publication, the programme was criticised by the New Democracy–led government for underestimating the costs of its pledges. Since then, it has also been criticised from within Syriza. In January 2015, Central Committee member Stathis Kouvelakis stated that the programme "was based on very over-optimistic estimates (or even simply wrong ones)".

== See also ==
- Anti-austerity protests
- Greek government-debt crisis
