= John Milios =

- Γιάννης Μηλιός
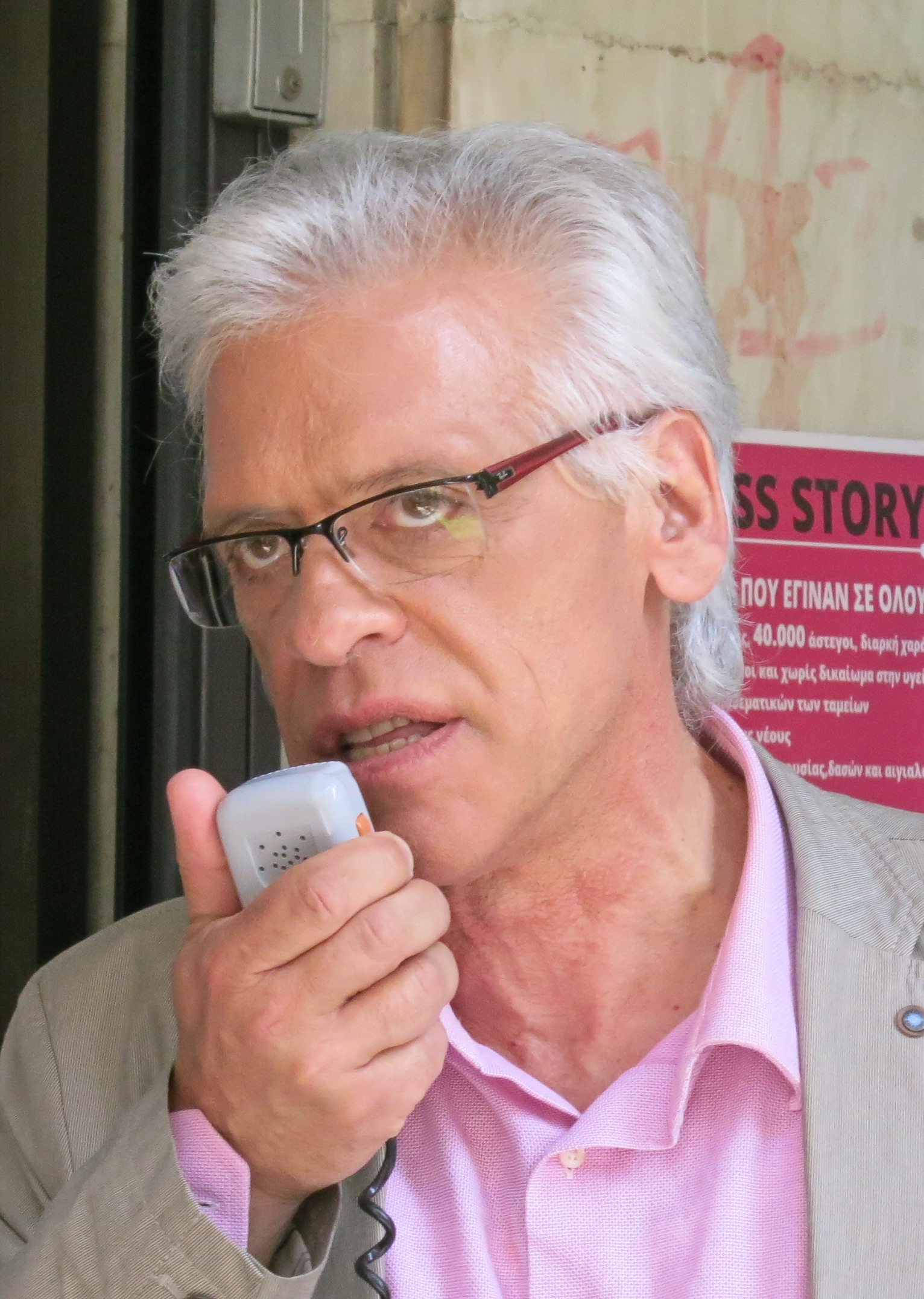
- John Milios in May 2014

Chief Economic Adviser for Syriza
- In office 2012 – March 2015
- Leader: Alexis Tsipras
- Succeeded by: Alekos Kalyvis

Personal details
- Born: 1952 (age 73–74) Athens, Greece
- Education: TU Darmstadt; University of Osnabrück; NTU Athens

John Milios (Greek: Γιάννης Μηλιός [ˈʝanis miˈʎos]; born 1952) is a Greek social scientist and Marxian economics scholar. He is Emeritus Professor of Political Economy and the History of Economic Thought at the National Technical University of Athens. An author of several scholarly books, Milios is also director of the quarterly journal of economic theory Theseis.

He was chief economic adviser of the Greek leftist party SYRIZA until March 2015.

== Early life and education ==
John Milios was born in 1952, in Athens as the son of a lawyer and a dentist. Having attended Athens College, he graduated in the same class with former prime minister George Papandreou, before studying mechanical engineering at TU Darmstadt, Germany, and Athens, where he received his Ph.D. in 1981.

During his studies, Milios became interested in political economics, founding the quarterly journal of economic theory Theseis in 1982. In 1988, he received his second Ph.D. in Social and Economic Studies at the University of Osnabrück, Germany.

== Political career ==
Since at least 2012 until March 2015 he was the chief economic adviser to Syriza. Syriza leader Alexis Tsipras leads a coalition government (First Cabinet of Alexis Tsipras) since the election on 25 January 2015. In February, Milios proposed a scheme to kick start struggling European economies. It involved the European Central Bank buying debt from Euro zone countries. It would hold the debt until the countries Gross domestic product (GDP) rose to five times its value. ("GDP-linked bond") Milios had proposed similar ideas in 2014.

== Economic theory ==
Regarding the Marxian concept of value-form, Milios argues for a monetary theory of value, where "Money is the necessary form of appearance of value (and of capital) in the sense that prices constitute the only form of appearance of the value of commodities."

Milios has authored more than two hundred papers published in refereed journals (in Greek, English, German, French, Spanish, Portuguese, Italian and Turkish) and has authored or co-authored more than ten scholarly books on Marxian economics.

== Main publications in English ==
- (with. D. Dimoulis; G. Economakis): Karl Marx and the Classics. An Essay on Value, Crises and the Capitalist Mode of Production Ashgate, 2002, ISBN 978-0754617983. new edition 2018 ISBN 9781138725935
- (with D.P. Sotiropoulos): Rethinking Imperialism. A Study of Capitalist Rule. Palgrave-Macmillan, 2009, ISBN 978-0230221000.
- (with D.P. Sotiropoulos & S. Lapatsioras): A Political Economy of Contemporary Capitalism and its Crisis. Demystifying Finance. Routledge, 2013 + 2015 (ISBN 978-1138901117)
- "The Origins of Capitalism as a Social System. The Prevalence of an Aleatory Encounter". Routledge, 2018 ISBN 9781138036703
