= Alekos Papadopoulos =

Greek politician

Alekos Papadopoulos (Greek: Αλέκος Παπαδόπουλος; b. 1949 in Giromeri, Thesprotia) is a Greek lawyer and politician of the Panhellenic Socialist Movement (PASOK). He is a former Member of Parliament and was a minister three different times.

== Political career ==
Between 1989 and 2004 he was a Member of the Hellenic Parliament for Thesprotia representing the Panhellenic Socialist Movement (PASOK). In 1994 Papadopoulos assumed as Minister of Economics. During his tenure he oversaw the structural adjustments which Greece had to undertake to enter the European Economic and Monetary Union. He initiated major reforms in the taxation of companies and also in the education of future civil servants establishing a School of Economics associated with the Ministry of Economics. From September 1996 onwards until February 1999 he acted as the Minister for Internal Affairs, Public Administration and Decentralization. As such, he implemented several reforms, most notably the “Kapodistrias plan", restructuring Greece in new administrative regions. In February 1999 he was forced to resign over accusations to have collaborated with Turkey in the capture of Abdullah Öcalan, the leader of the Kurdistan Workers' Party (PKK). In April 2000 he was appointed Minister of Health. In June 2002, he announced that he would not present himself as a candidate in the upcoming elections, but still mentioned he would implement the reforms he had initiated. This caused some frictions within the PASOK party specially with Prime Minister Costas Simitis who was disappointed that such a popular politician would leave his team and dismissed him a few days after. As a former minister he often comments on the political situation or criticizes the financial politics of the Greek government. In 2018, he doubted that Greece would be able to stay within the Eurozone.
