= Ministry of National Economy and Finance (Greece) =

Government ministry of Greece

- Υπουργείο Εθνικής Οικονομίας και Οικονομικών
- Coat of arms of the Hellenic Republic

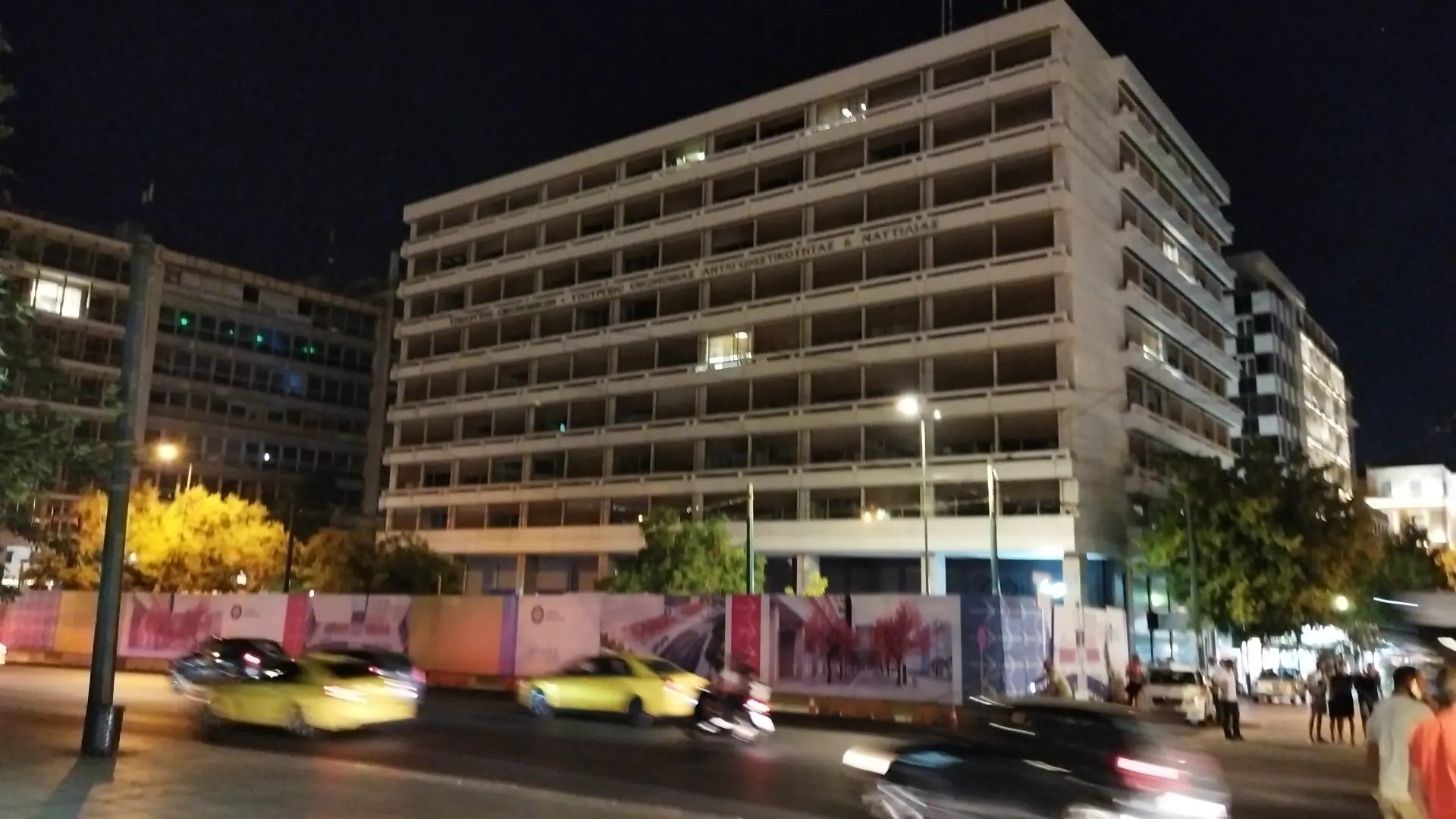
- Headquarters of the Ministry in Syntagma square

Agency overview
- Formed: August 1, 2023
- Preceding agency: Ministry of Finance (2009 - 2023)
- Jurisdiction: Government of Greece
- Headquarters: Nikis 5 - 7, Athens
- Employees: 3.568 (2023)
- Annual budget: 1.049.897.798.000 euro (2024)
- Ministers responsible: Kyriakos Pierrakakis, Alternate Minister; Nikos Papathanasis
- Deputy Ministers responsible: Giorgos Kotsiras responsible for Tax Policy; Thanos Petralias responsible for Fiscal Policy
- Child agencies: General Secretariat of Economic Policy and Strategy; General Secretariat of Fiscal Policy; General Secretariat of Tax Policy; General Secretariat of Public Property; Administrative Secretary
- Website: minfin.gov.gr

The Ministry of National Economy and Finance (Greek: Υπουργείο Εθνικής Οικονομίας και Οικονομικών) is the government department responsible for overseeing Greece's public finances. The current minister is Kyriakos Pierrakakis, a member of the Hellenic Parliament representing the Athens A constituency for the New Democracy party.

The ministry was established in August 2023 through a renaming and reorganization of the former Ministry of Finance under the Mitsotakis government. The restructured ministry now incorporates entities previously managed by the Ministry of Development.

== Minister's role ==
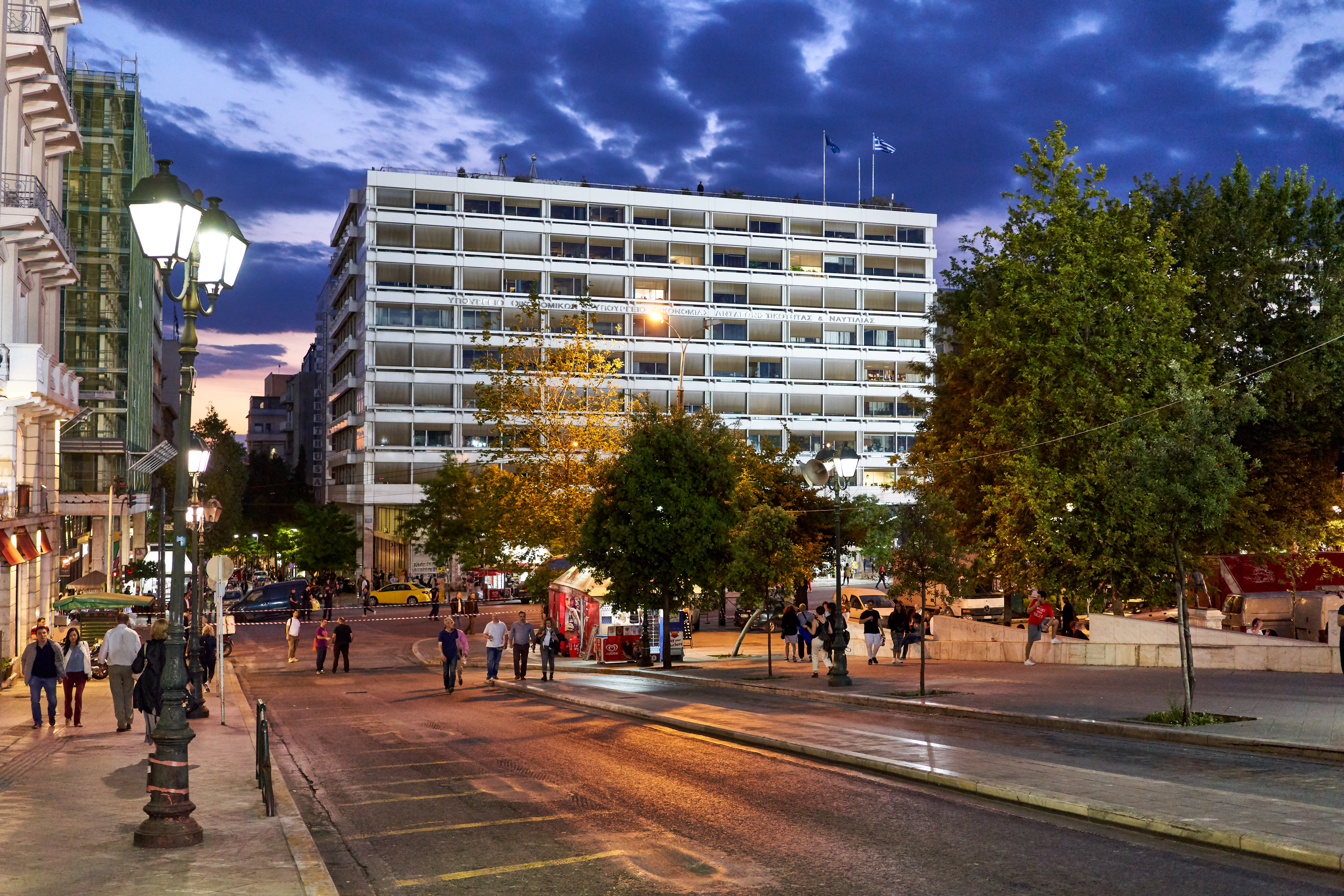
View of the Hellenic Ministry of Finance from Othonos Street, Athens

According to Article 73 of the Constitution of Greece, any bills relating to pensions must be submitted by the Minister of Finance. According to Article 75 of the Constitution, any bill relating to expenditure or a reduction in revenue must not be introduced unless accompanied by a special report on the bill, signed by the Minister of Finance. Finally, according to Article 79 of the Constitution, the Minister of Finance must bring the budget before the Hellenic Parliament at least one month before the start of the fiscal year, for it to be voted on.

== Lists of ministers ==
=== Finance (1967–2002) ===
Name	Took office	Left office	Party	Notes
Adamantios Androutsopoulos	21 April 1967	25 August 1971		Military junta
Ioannis Koulis	25 August 1971	23 November 1973		Military junta
Yiangos Pesmazoglou	26 July 1974	9 October 1974		National unity government of Konstantinos Karamanlis
Nikolaos Fotias	9 October 1974	21 November 1974		National unity government of Konstantinos Karamanlis
Evangelos Devletoglou	21 November 1974	28 November 1977	New Democracy	
Ioannis Boutos	28 November 1977	10 May 1978	New Democracy	
Athanasios Kanellopoulos	10 May 1978	10 May 1980	New Democracy	
Miltiadis Evert	10 May 1980	21 October 1981	New Democracy	
Manolis Drettakis	21 October 1981	28 June 1982	PASOK	
Dimitrios Koulourianos	28 June 1982	9 September 1983	PASOK	
Ioannis Pottakis	9 September 1983	27 March 1984	PASOK	
Gerasimos Arsenis	27 March 1984	26 July 1985	PASOK	
Dimitris Tsovolas	26 July 1985	2 July 1989	PASOK	
Antonis Samaras	2 July 1989	12 October 1989	New Democracy	Coalition government of Tzannis Tzannetakis
Georgios Agapitos	12 October 1989	23 November 1989		Caretaker Cabinet of Ioannis Grivas
Georgios Souflias	23 November 1989	13 February 1990	New Democracy	Ecumenical government of Xenophon Zolotas
Georgios Agapitos	13 February 1990	11 April 1990		Ecumenical government of Xenophon Zolotas
Ioannis Palaiokrassas	11 April 1990	7 August 1992	New Democracy	
Stefanos Manos	7 August 1992	13 October 1993	New Democracy	
Georgios Gennimatas	13 October 1993	25 February 1994	PASOK	
Alekos Papadopoulos	25 February 1994	25 September 1996	PASOK	
Yiannos Papantoniou	25 September 1996	24 October 2001	PASOK	
Nikos Christodoulakis	24 October 2001	21 March 2002	PASOK	

=== National economy (1982–2002) ===
Name	Took office	Left office	Party	Notes
Gerasimos Arsenis	5 July 1982	26 July 1985	PASOK	
Costas Simitis	26 July 1985	27 November 1987	PASOK	
Panagiotis Roumeliotis	27 November 1987	2 July 1989	PASOK	
Georgios Souflias	2 July 1989	12 October 1989	New Democracy	Coalition government of Tzannis Tzannetakis
Giorgos Kontogeorgis	12 October 1989	23 November 1989	New Democracy	Caretaker government of Ioannis Grivas
Georgios Gennimatas	23 November 1989	13 February 1990	PASOK	Ecumenical government of Xenophon Zolotas
Giorgos Kontogeorgis	13 February 1990	11 April 1990	New Democracy	Ecumenical government of Xenophon Zolotas
Georgios Souflias	11 April 1990	1 October 1990	New Democracy	
Konstantinos Mitsotakis	1 October 1990	8 August 1991	New Democracy	
Efthymios Christodoulou	8 August 1991	17 February 1992	New Democracy	
Stefanos Manos	17 February 1992	13 October 1993	New Democracy	
Georgios Gennimatas	13 October 1993	25 April 1994	PASOK	Died in office
Yiannos Papantoniou	6 May 1994	24 October 2001	PASOK	
Nikos Christodoulakis	24 October 2001	21 March 2002	PASOK	

=== Economy and finance (2002–2009) ===
Name	Took office	Left office	Party	Notes
Nikos Christodoulakis	21 March 2002	10 March 2004	PASOK	The national economy and finance ministries were officially amalgamated on 21 March 2002.
Georgios Alogoskoufis	10 March 2004	7 January 2009	New Democracy	
Yannis Papathanasiou	8 January 2009	7 October 2009	New Democracy	

=== Finance (2009–2023) ===
Name	Took office	Left office	Party	Notes
Giorgos Papakonstantinou	7 October 2009	17 June 2011	PASOK	
Evangelos Venizelos	17 June 2011	21 March 2012	PASOK	Coalition Cabinet of Lucas Papademos from 11 November 2011
Filippos Sachinidis	21 March 2012	17 May 2012	PASOK	Coalition Cabinet of Lucas Papademos from 11 November 2011
George Zanias	17 May 2012	5 July 2012	Independent	Caretaker Cabinet of Panagiotis Pikrammenos
Yannis Stournaras	5 July 2012	10 June 2014	Independent	Coalition Cabinet of Antonis Samaras
Gikas Hardouvelis	10 June 2014	27 January 2015	Independent	Coalition Cabinet of Antonis Samaras
Yanis Varoufakis	27 January 2015	6 July 2015	Syriza	First Coalition Cabinet of Alexis Tsipras
Euclid Tsakalotos	6 July 2015	27 August 2015	Syriza	First Coalition Cabinet of Alexis Tsipras
George Chouliarakis	28 August 2015	21 September 2015	Independent	Caretaker Cabinet of Vassiliki Thanou-Christophilou
Euclid Tsakalotos	23 September 2015	9 July 2019	Syriza	Second Coalition Cabinet of Alexis Tsipras
Christos Staikouras	9 July 2019	26 May 2023	New Democracy	First Cabinet of Kyriakos Mitsotakis
Theodore Pelagidis	26 May 2023	27 June 2023	Independent	Caretaker Cabinet of Ioannis Sarmas

=== National economy and finance (since 2023) ===
Name	Took office	Left office	Party	Notes
Kostis Hatzidakis	27 June 2023	15 March 2025	New Democracy	Second Cabinet of Kyriakos Mitsotakis; the ministry was officially renamed on 1 August 2023.
Kyriakos Pierrakakis	15 March 2025	Incumbent	New Democracy	Second Cabinet of Kyriakos Mitsotakis; the ministry was officially renamed on 1 August 2023.

== See also ==
- Bank of Greece
