= Kyriakos Velopoulos =

Greek politician (born 1965)

- Κυριάκος Βελόπουλος
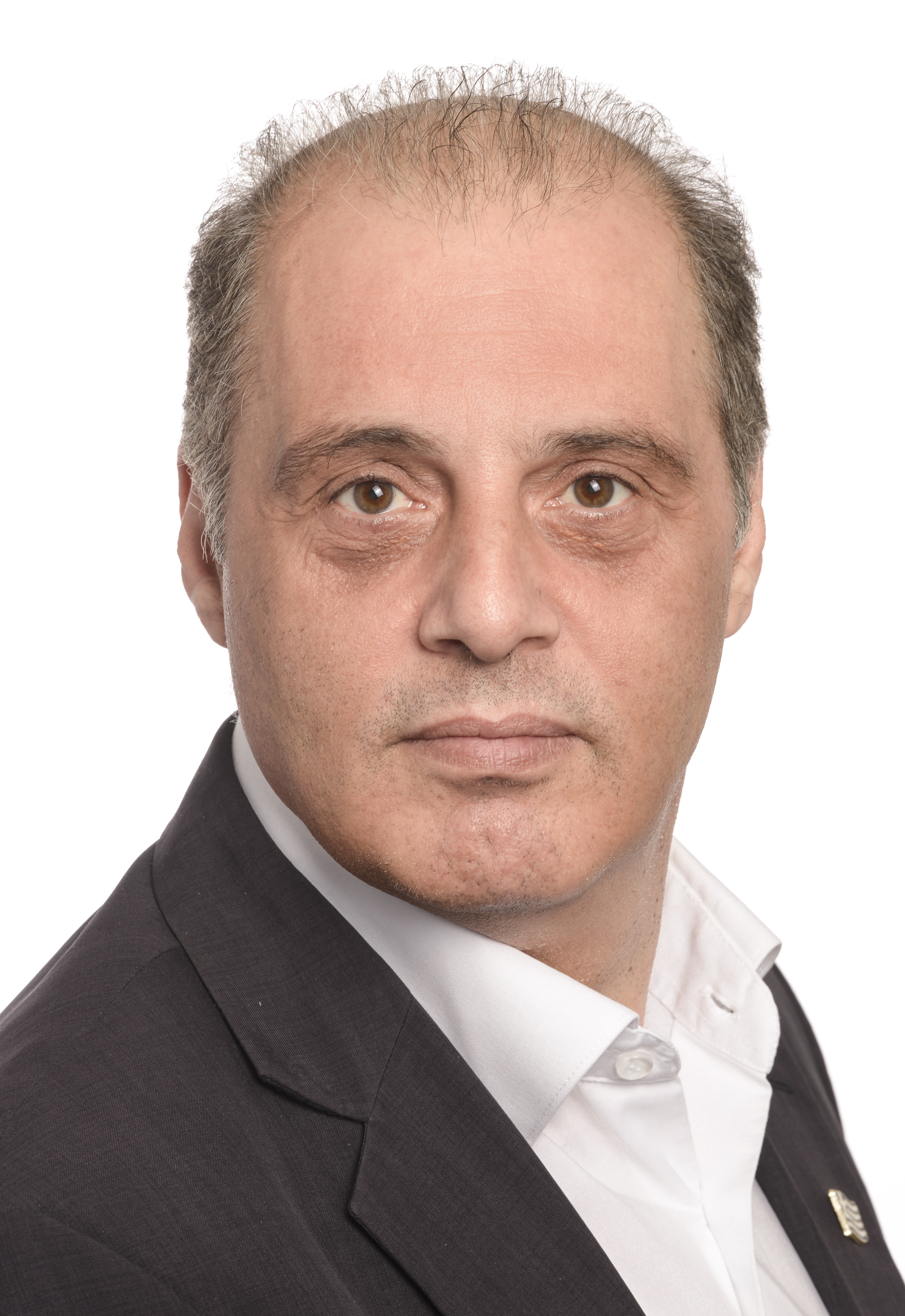
- Official portrait, 2019

President of the Greek Solution
- Incumbent
- Assumed office 28 June 2016
- Preceded by: Party established

Member of the Hellenic Parliament
- Incumbent
- Assumed office 7 July 2019
- Constituency: Athens B3 (2023–present); Larissa (2019–2023)
- In office 16 September 2007 – 11 April 2012
- Constituency: Thessaloniki B

Member of the European Parliament
- In office 2 July 2019 – 7 July 2019
- Constituency: Greece

Personal details
- Born: Kyriakos Iosif Velopoulos; 24 October 1965 (age 60) Essen, North Rhine-Westphalia, West Germany
- Party: Greek Solution (2016–present)
- Other political affiliations: New Democracy (2012–2015); Popular Orthodox Rally (2004–2012)
- Spouse: Olga Petropoulou (m. 1996)
- Children: 1
- Education: Open University of Cyprus
- Profession: Politician; Historian; Journalist; Author
- Website: www.velopoulos.gr

Kyriakos Iosif Velopoulos (Greek: Κυριάκος Ιωσήφ Βελόπουλος; born 24 October 1965) is a Greek politician who has served as the president of the right-wing political party Greek Solution since its foundation in 2016. He has been a member of the Hellenic Parliament since 2019, having previously served as a parliamentary representative from 2007 to 2012 under LAOS. In addition to his political career, he is a Historian, Journalist, and Author.

== Early life and education ==
Kyriakos Iosif Velopoulos was born on 24 October 1965 in West Germany, and grew up in Thessaloniki, Greece. He is of Cappadocian Greek ancestry. After his graduation from Dendropotamos high school, he studied journalism at the Center of Liberal Philosophical Social Studies (a private educational institution) in Thessaloniki under a scholarship and graduated from there in 1990.

He earned a bachelor's degree on Greek civilization studies from the Open University of Cyprus in 2013 and a master's degree in journalism from the same university in 2016.

During his compulsory military service in the Hellenic Army, he served as an officer on the islands of North-Eastern Aegean Sea, and the Greek mainland. He is a member of the Academy of the Greek language in Germany and a member of the Union of Writers of Northern Greece. He was a member of the youth organisation of PASOK until 1988 and ideologically defines himself as belonging to the "patriotic PASOK".

== Political career ==
=== In Popular Orthodox Rally ===
He was a member of the Popular Orthodox Rally (LAOS), the right-wing populist party of Giorgos Karatzaferis where he was a candidate in the 2004 Greek parliamentary elections, taking 5,700 votes. But he failed to be elected, because LAOS received only 2.19% of votes. In the regional elections of 2006, he was a candidate as Governor of Pella Prefecture where he came third with 7.11% and 2 seats. In the parliamentary elections of 2007 and 2009, he was elected in the B prefecture of Thessaloniki. In 2010 Velopoulos was chosen by LAOS as its candidate in the region of Central Macedonia.

=== In New Democracy ===
On May 20, 2012, Velopoulos made the decision to leave the LAOS political party along with other politicians and joined the New Democracy party. He proclaimed to support "the large centre-right faction with a European orientation" although he declined to run as a candidate in the 2012 legislative elections. After a number of years with New Democracy, Velopoulos made the decision in 2015 to depart from the party with the aim of creating a new political party.

=== President of the Greek Solution (2016–present) ===
In 2016, he founded the Greek Solution party. From 2016 onward he has served as president of the political party Greek Solution "Greek: Ελληνική Λύση", which won 10 national parliamentary seats in the 2019 Greek legislative election. Following the 2019 elections Velopoulos holds the parliamentary seat in the prefecture of Larissa. In the 2019 Εuropean elections, his party gained one seat for the Εuropean parliament. In the 2023 June and May elections the party managed to slightly raise its percentage from the previous elections. In the 2024 EU elections his party almost doubled its percentage climbing to an astounding 9.3% electing two MEPs

Velopoulos has raised objections about the indictment of Golden Dawn's members and he has characterised the arrests of them as a well-played plot οrchestrated "by the domestic government and judicial system".

== Journalism ==
As a journalist he has worked in a number of radio and television stations, such as "TV Thessaloniki", "Ερμής", "Best", "Top", "Opion", "TeleAsty", where he presented his two major shows "Η Βουλή" and "Ελληνόραμα", in which he promotes his books. Today he is presenter and owner of "Alert TV" channel.

== Work as an author ==
He is the author of Greece Bleeds, which he claims deals with the corruption of Greek society, army, legal system and politics, and Alexander, the Greatest of the Greeks, a detailed biography of Alexander the Great which includes arguments on the subject's Greek origins.

== Controversy ==
In 2012, it was revealed that he had sent the amount of €400,000 abroad, amid fears of Greece defaulting.

In 2014, Velopoulos advertised a book by the author Ioannis Papazisis entitled "Manuscripts reveal the unknown moments of Christ" through his telemarketing broadcast. The book contains copies of manuscripts found in the monasteries of Mount Athos, including medieval manuscripts of the Jesus Abgar epistles. Several years later during the run-up to the 2019 Greek legislative election, where Velopoulos was running for office, some Greek media outlets reintroduced excerpts of the 2014 book sale alleging that Velopoulos advertised "epistles of Jesus Christ". This elicited widespread criticism from the Greek academic community and mainstream media, which disputed the historicity of these particular artifacts and accused Velopoulos of misleading consumers. Velopoulos initially denied having engaged in the sale of the letters, later acknowledging the fact and stating that he would continue to sell them, claiming that his critics lacked the knowledge necessary to dispute the letter's authenticity. He supported that the epistles are authentic and kept in monasteries of Mount Athos.

Order of precedence
Preceded by Dimitris Koutsoumpas as General Secretary of the Communist Party	Order of precedence of Greece; President of the Greek Solution	Succeeded by Alexis Haritsis as President of New Left
