= Parties in the European Council during 2012 =

The member-states of the European Union by the European party affiliations of their leaders, as of 1 January 2012.

This article describes the party affiliations of leaders of each member-state represented in the European Council during the year 2012. The list below gives the political party that each head of government, or head of state, belongs to at the national level, as well as the European political alliance to which that national party belongs. The states are listed from most to least populous. More populous states have greater influence in the council, in accordance with the system of Qualified Majority Voting.

== Summary ==
Party	1 January 2012		10 February 2012		4 April 2012		15 May 2012		20 June 2012		10 July 2012		27 August 2012
Party	#	QMV	#	QMV	#	QMV	#	QMV	#	QMV	#	QMV	#	QMV
European People's Party	15	202	16	206	15	199	14	170	15	182	14	168	15	182
Independent	3	48	3	48	3	48	3	48	2	36	2	36	2	36
Alliance of European Conservatives and Reformists	2	41	2	41	2	41	2	41	2	41	2	41	2	41
Party of European Socialists	4	33	3	29	4	36	5	65	5	65	5	65	5	65
European Liberal Democrat and Reform Party	2	17	2	17	2	17	2	17	2	17	3	31	2	17
Party of the European Left	1	4	1	4	1	4	1	4	1	4	1	4	1	4

== List of leaders (1 January 2012) ==
Member-state	Votes	Leader	National party	European party
Germany	29	Angela Merkel	CDU	EPP
France	29	Nicolas Sarkozy	UMP	EPP
United Kingdom	29	David Cameron	Con	AECR
Italy	29	Mario Monti	Independent
Spain	27	Mariano Rajoy	PP	EPP
Poland	27	Donald Tusk	PO	EPP
Romania	14	Traian Băsescu	Independent	EPP
Netherlands	13	Mark Rutte	VVD	ELDR
Greece	12	Lucas Papademos	Independent
Belgium	12	Elio Di Rupo	PS	PES
Portugal	12	Pedro Passos Coelho	PPD/PSD	EPP
Czech Republic	12	Petr Nečas	ODS	AECR
Hungary	12	Viktor Orbán	Fidesz	EPP
Sweden	10	Fredrik Reinfeldt	M	EPP
Austria	10	Werner Faymann	SPÖ	PES
Bulgaria	10	Boyko Borisov	GERB	EPP
Denmark	7	Helle Thorning-Schmidt	A	PES
Slovakia	7	Iveta Radičová	SDKÚ–DS	EPP
Finland	7	Jyrki Katainen	Kok.	EPP
Ireland	7	Enda Kenny	FG	EPP
Lithuania	7	Dalia Grybauskaitė	Independent
Latvia	4	Valdis Dombrovskis	V	EPP
Slovenia	4	Borut Pahor	SD	PES
Estonia	4	Andrus Ansip	RE	ELDR
Cyprus	4	Demetris Christofias	AKEL	PEL
Luxembourg	4	Jean-Claude Juncker	CSV	EPP
Malta	3	Lawrence Gonzi	PN	EPP

Supported by PD-L AKEL holds only observer status with the Party of the European Left.

== Changes ==
=== Affiliation ===
Date	Member-state	Leader	National party	European party
10 February	Slovenia	Janez Janša	SDS	EPP
4 April	Slovakia	Robert Fico	SMER-SD	PES
15 May	France	François Hollande	PS	PES
20 June	Greece	Antonis Samaras	ND	EPP
10 July	Romania	Crin Antonescu	PNL	ELDR
27 August	Romania	Traian Băsescu	Independent	EPP

The party's name was changed to Alliance of Liberals and Democrats for Europe Party (ALDE Party) on 10 November 2012.
Supported by PD-L

=== Office-holder only ===
Date	Member-state	Leader	National party	European party
16 May	Greece	Panagiotis Pikrammenos	Independent

== See also ==
- Presidency of the Council of the European Union
