= Lucas Papademos =

Former Prime Minister of Greece

- Λουκάς Παπαδήμος
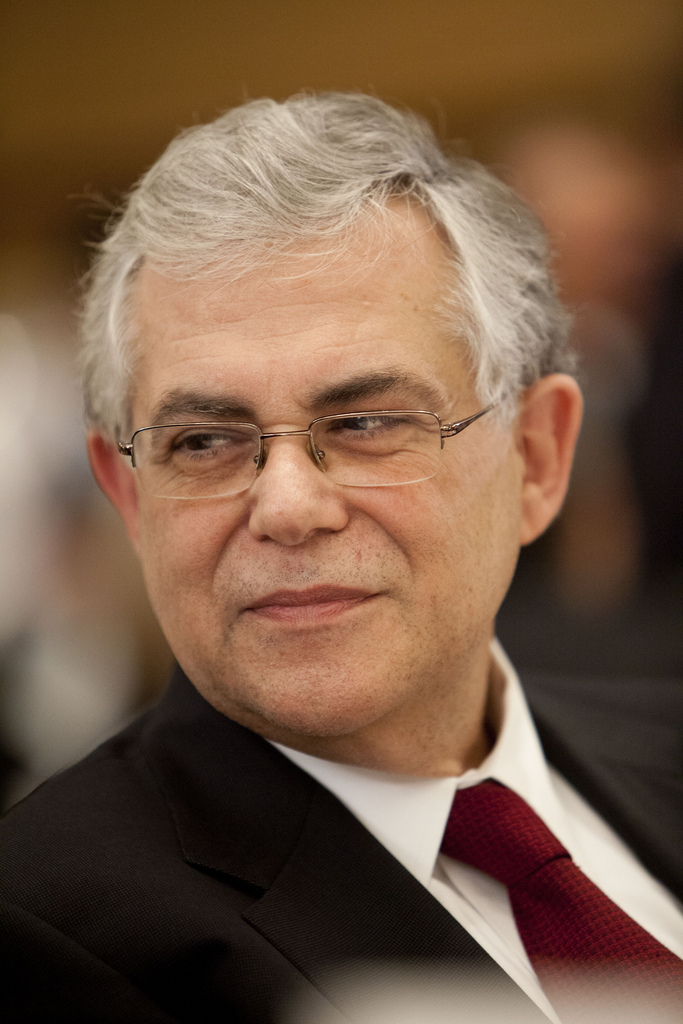
- Papademos in 2012

Prime Minister of Greece
- In office 11 November 2011 – 16 May 2012
- President: Karolos Papoulias
- Deputy: Theodoros Pangalos; Evangelos Venizelos
- Preceded by: George Papandreou
- Succeeded by: Panayiotis Pikrammenos (caretaker)

Personal details
- Born: Lucas Demetrios Papademos; 11 October 1947 (age 78) Athens, Greece
- Party: Independent
- Spouse: Shanna Ingram
- Education: Massachusetts Institute of Technology (BS, MSE, PhD)
- Occupation: Economist; professor

Lucas Demetrios Papademos (Greek: Λουκάς Παπαδήμος; born 11 October 1947) is a Greek economist and academic who served as Prime Minister of Greece from November 2011 to May 2012, leading a national unity government in the wake of the Greek debt crisis. A technocrat, he previously served as Vice-President of the European Central Bank from 2002 to 2010 and Governor of the Bank of Greece from 1994 to 2002.

He was professor at Columbia University, the University of Athens, and Harvard Kennedy School at Harvard University, and is a senior fellow at the Center for Financial Studies at the University of Frankfurt.

== Early life and education ==
Papademos was born in Athens to parents who came from the town of Desfina in Phocis. After graduating from Athens College in 1966, Papademos was accepted into the Massachusetts Institute of Technology, where he gained a bachelor's degree in physics in 1970, a master's degree in electrical engineering in 1972, and a doctorate in economics in 1978.

== Career as an economist ==
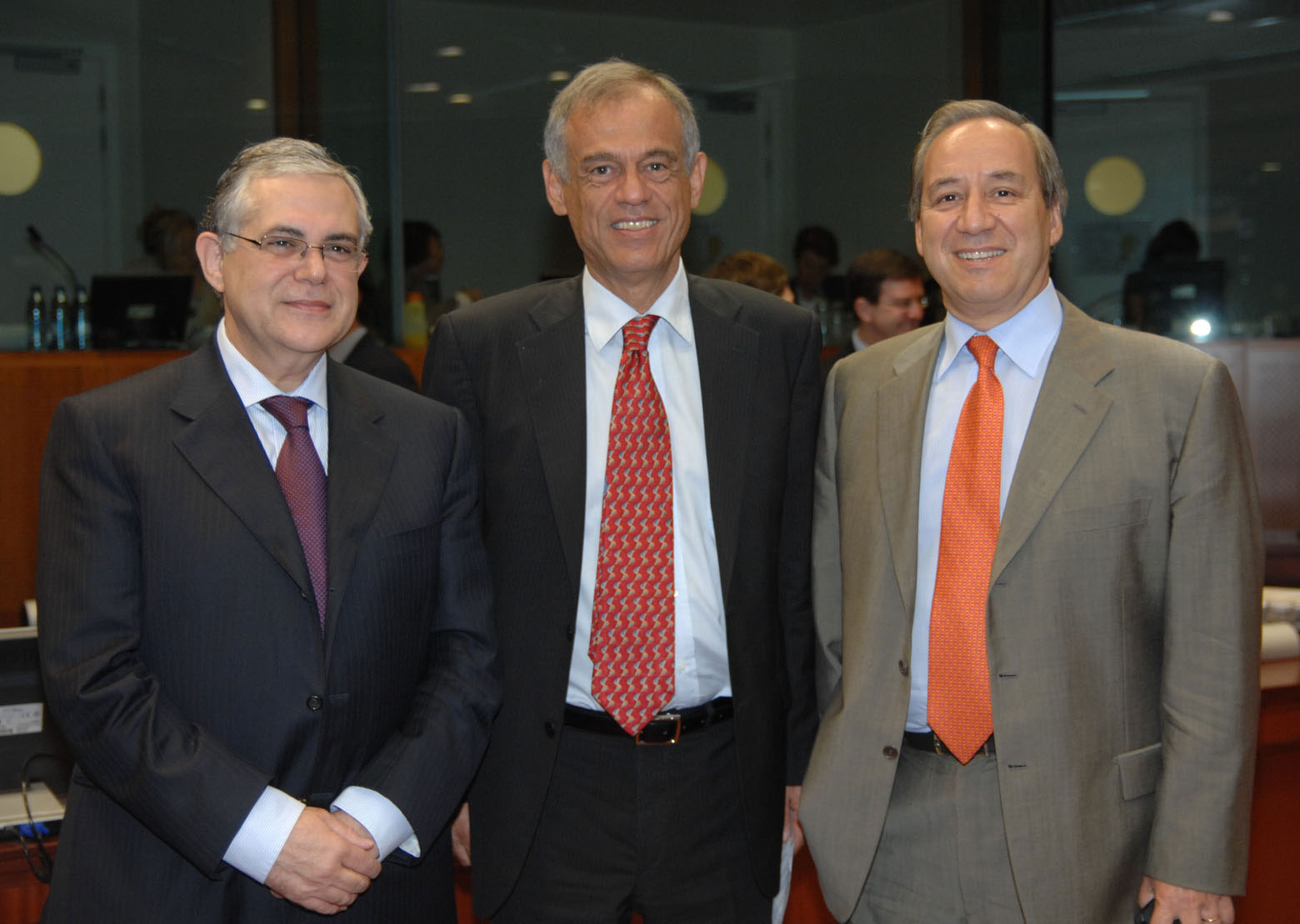
Lucas Papademos as Vice President of the European Central Bank, Michalis Sarris, Finance Minister of Cyprus and George Alogoskoufis, Finance Minister of Greece during a 2007 ECOFIN at Brussels.

In 1975, he worked with Franco Modigliani on the NAIRU concept. He engaged in a career in academia, teaching economics at Columbia University from 1975 until 1984, before moving to the University of Athens in 1988.

His work as an economist began in 1980, when he was appointed senior economist at the Federal Reserve Bank of Boston. He joined the Bank of Greece in 1985 as its chief economist, rising to the rank of deputy governor in 1993, and finally governor in 1994. During his time as governor of the central bank, Papademos was involved in Greece's transition from the drachma to the euro as its national currency.

After leaving the Bank of Greece in 2002, Papademos became the vice president to Wim Duisenberg, and then Jean-Claude Trichet, at the European Central Bank from 2002 to 2010. In 2010 he served as an economic advisor to Greek Prime Minister George Papandreou. He was previously a member of the non-governmental group Trilateral Commission.

He is a member of the Academy of Athens. He has published numerous articles in the fields of macroeconomic theory, the structure and functioning of financial markets, monetary analysis and policy, theory of chaos as well as on subjects concerning the economic performance, financial stability, financial instability and economic policy in the European Union. He has also delivered addresses on the Greek debt crisis.

== Prime Minister of Greece (2011–2012) ==
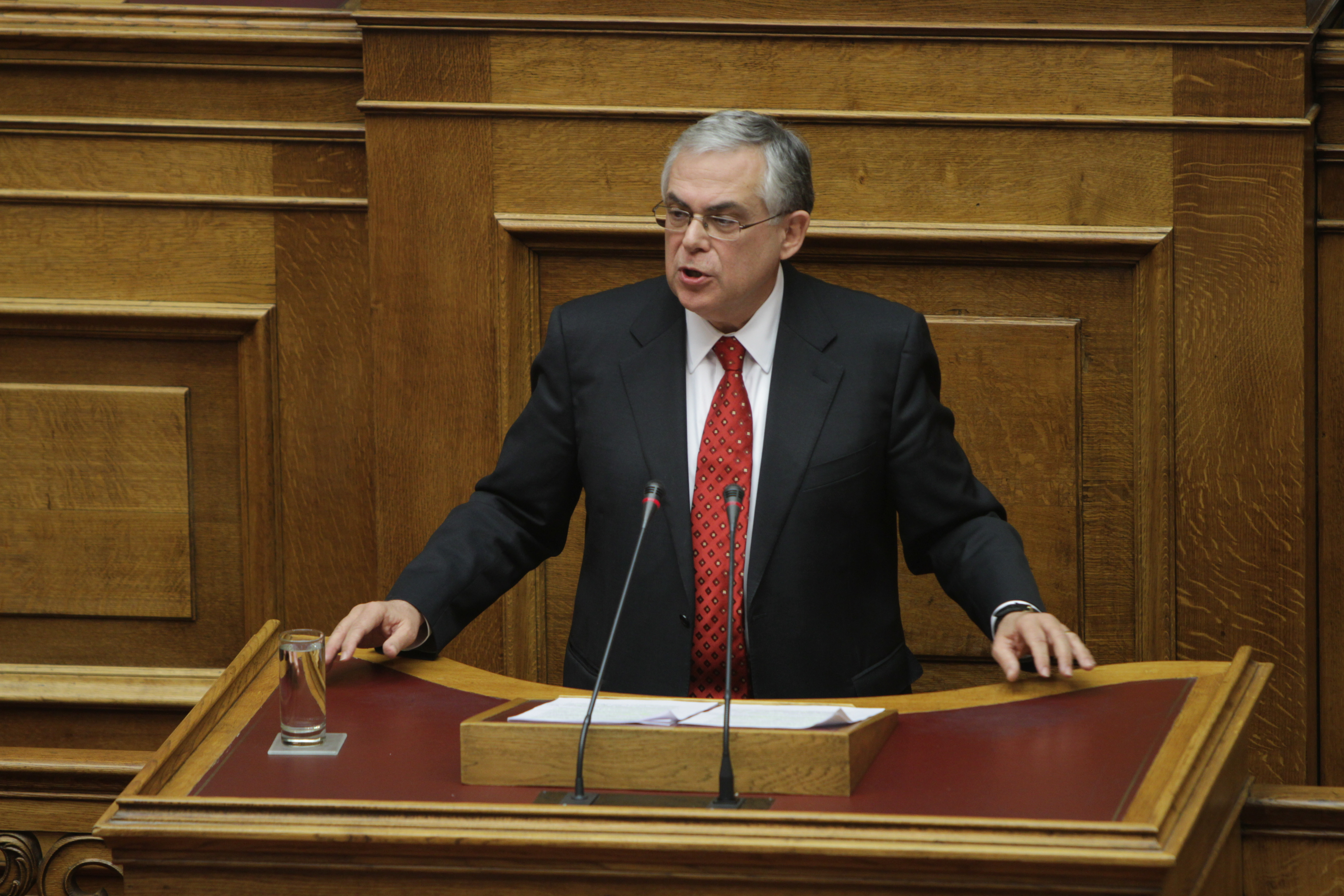
Prime Minister Papademos speaking to the Hellenic Parliament on 14 November 2011.

Papademos was first proposed as a potential caretaker prime minister of Greece in early November 2011, after Prime Minister George Papandreou offered to resign and allow a provisional coalition government to deal with the major political turmoil caused by the country's debt crisis.

Lucas Papademos set two conditions upon which he would accept the offer of being prime minister of this provisional government. The first, was that the new government would not have a very restricted life span as New Democracy had demanded, and the second was that political figures from both New Democracy and the Panhellenic Socialist Movement (PASOK) would participate in the government. Both of these were initially vetoed by New Democracy, but after several days of negotiations they relented and accepted Papademos's demands. This enabled Papademos to form a government made up of PASOK and New Democracy, with the support of the far-right Popular Orthodox Rally.

After a week of political turmoil and negotiations between parties triggered by Papandreou's resignation, Papademos was installed as Prime Minister of Greece on 11 November 2011, unveiling his provisional Cabinet shortly afterwards. The other two parliamentary parties, the Communist Party and the Coalition of the Radical Left (SYRIZA), had refused Papandreou's invitation to participate in the government. The provisional government also marks the first time that the far-right has played a part in any Greek government since the fall of the military junta in 1974.

Papademos stated that his government's primary task would be to facilitate the financial bailout from the European Union – which was provided on the condition that severe budget austerity be implemented – and to lead the country until elections could be held. Papademos also stated that his sole priority as prime minister would be to try to keep Greece within the Eurozone.

In January 2012, Papademos warned that workers would have to accept substantial cuts in their income in order for a default to be avoided. He also told business and union leaders that the "troika" — the European Union, the International Monetary Fund and the ECB — was looking for Greece to take steps to open up so-called closed professions, as well as adjustments to the minimum wage, abolition of Christmas and summer vacation bonuses and automatic wage increases. Papademos also declared in January that his provisional government would last until at least April, instead of February as was originally planned, so that further austerity measures could be implemented before an election.

In late April 2012, Papademos announced that he would ask President Karolos Papoulias to dissolve the Hellenic Parliament, paving the way for a general election to be held on 6 May 2012. Papademos had intended to stand down shortly after this election, but it resulted in a hung parliament. Subsequently, New Democracy, PASOK, and the anti-austerity SYRIZA – which had jumped into second place – attempted to form a government, but all were unsuccessful. Emergency negotiations to attempt to avoid a return to the polls took place on 13 May, but were inconclusive. On the same day, Papademos wrote to President Papoulias to inform him that the Ministry of Finance could only afford to pay salaries until the end of June, and that the need for Greece to recapitalise her liquid assets was "urgent". Negotiations in the aftermath of the election were unable to produce a government leading to a snap general election, which took place on 17 June 2012. In the wake of the announcement of the election Papademos stepped down, proposing Panayiotis Pikrammenos – a judge and the President of the Council of State – to replace him as caretaker prime minister until a permanent government could be formed.

== Other activities ==
- Trilateral Commission, Member of the European Group

== Personal life ==
As of 2011, Papademos has been married to Shanna Ingram for more than 30 years. They have no children. Of Dutch descent, as of 2012 she was the president of the charity group Association of Friends of Children with Cancer.

=== Assassination attempt ===
In Athens on 25 May 2017, a suspected letter bomb exploded within his car, causing non-life-threatening arm, leg and stomach injuries to Papademos. His driver sustained leg injuries in the attack and another passenger, a banking official, was also injured.

Government offices
Preceded by Ioannis Boutos	Governor of the Bank of Greece; 1994–2002	Succeeded by Nikolaos Garganas
Preceded by Christian Noyer	Vice-President of the European Central Bank; 2002–2010	Succeeded by Vítor Constâncio
Political offices
Preceded by George Papandreou	Prime Minister of Greece; 2011–2012	Succeeded by Panayiotis Pikrammenos
Academic offices
Preceded by Zanasis Valtinos	President of the Academy of Athens; 2017–2018	Succeeded by Antonios Kounadis
Order of precedence
Preceded by George Papandreou as former Prime Minister	Order of precedence of Greece; Former Prime Minister	Succeeded by Panayiotis Pikrammenos as former Prime Minister
