= May 2012 Greek government formation =

The Greek government formation of May 2012 was a series of failed attempts to form a new government after the legislative election in May 2012 by the three largest parties: New Democracy (centre-right), Coalition of the Radical Left (SYRIZA, left-far left) and Panhellenic Socialist Movement (PASOK, centre-Left), respectively, and then followed by the President of Greece. After the negotiations led by the president had failed on 15 May, a temporary caretaker cabinet under Council of State president Panagiotis Pikrammenos was appointed on 16 May, and a new election was set for 17 June.

== Procedure ==
Article 37 of the Greek constitution stipulates the procedure for attempts to form governments after a national legislative election. As the 2012 Greek legislative election resulted in no single party with a majority of parliament seats, the Greek constitution stipulates that the largest party in relative terms of the voting result, shall be given a chance to negotiate the formation of a government within three days. Failing that, the second largest party will get a chance within the next three days and if this attempt also fails the third biggest party will get a further three days to try and form a government. If neither of the three largest parties can succeed in forming a government, the baton will be handed over to the president for a last neutral attempt to form a government, where he will meet with all party leaders. If this attempt fails as well, a temporary caretaker government will be formed with the purpose of setting up a date for a new legislative election.

If this attempt fails, then, according to article 37 paragraph 3 in the constitution of Greece, the president will try to form a temporary caretaker government with all parties for the purpose of preparing for an election. If this fails yet again the President of the Supreme Administrative Court, the President of the Supreme Civil and Criminal Court or the President of the Court of Audit, will be called to form a temporary caretaker government with the widest available support in order to prepare for a new election.

== Negotiations by New Democracy ==
The day after the election, president Karolos Papoulias met with the leader of the largest party—New Democracy's (ND) leader Antonis Samaras—to task him with the first attempt to form a government. The Democratic Left (DIMAR) declared that the party would not join a pro-bailout New Democracy-PASOK grand coalition government. Democratic Left leader Fotis Kouvelis said that his party would only "participate in a coalition government with other progressive forces," such as the other leftist anti-bailout parties SYRIZA and Communist Party of Greece (KKE). SYRIZA's Alexis Tsipras refused to join in a coalition with ND saying that: "The campaign positions of Mr Samaras are at the opposite end of the alternative proposals of a left-wing government. There can be no government of national salvation, as Samaras has named it, because his signatures and commitments to the loan agreement do not constitute salvation but a tragedy for the people and the country." Independent Greeks (ANEL) also refused to discuss joining a coalition with ND. For its part, ND said that it would be open to talks with any party except Golden Dawn (XA), with Samaras saying he would likely end his efforts the following day, ahead of the deadline. KKE also refused to discuss the possibility of a government with ND. PASOK also said that it would consider joining a grand coalition only if other left-wing parties were in the government. At the end of the first day itself, ND's Samaras announced that he had failed in trying to form a "national salvation" government: "I did whatever I could to secure a result but it was impossible. I informed Papoulias and returned the mandate."

== Negotiations by SYRIZA ==
On 8 May, Tsipras was tasked by Papoulias to attempt forming a government within the stipulated three days. Tsipras stated that "we will exhaust all possibilities to reach an understanding, primarily with the forces of the left" and that the election result was a "message of overthrow against the barbaric measures put forth by the EU-IMF loan agreement." Tsipras said he wanted ND and PASOK to tell the EU in writing that they would not adhere to their pledge to maintain the austerity measures demanded before meeting them on 9 May saying that "the bailout parties no longer have a majority in parliament to vote for measures that plunder the country." ND's Antonis Samaras refused to do so and said that he would support a minority government if need be. He also said Tsipras' demands could "lead to immediate internal collapse and international bankruptcy, with the inevitable exit from Europe."

The Independent Greeks' Panos Kammenos had also criticised Tsipras already one week ahead of the election day, saying that "there is not a sufficient majority to form an anti-memorandum front." As he had calculated that SYRIZA's 52 MPs, Independent Greeks' 33 and Democratic Left's 19 did not add up to the minority of 120 seats needed, in view of the Communist Party's refusal. He also said that the discussion of "issues of national importance, including the Macedonia naming issue and illegal immigration, led to differences of opinion." Tsipras then later said his attempts had failed and told his parliamentary group that "we cannot make true our dream of a left-wing government. Tomorrow, I shall hand back the mandate given to me by the president of the republic and we shall continue to take part in the constitutional processes." He had previously said the election "has clearly nullified the loan agreement and [pledges] sent to Europe and the IMF" (International Monetary Fund).

At the same time the EU decided to continue with Greece's disbursements which mean sending US$5.4 billion on 10 May, but an additional US$1.29 billion was held back. As a result of the political imbroglio both PASOK and ND suggested the EU and IMF agreement could have to be re-evaluated. In response, Luxembourg Foreign Minister Jean Asselborn said that "we have to say to the Greek people right now that the situation is serious, that no European Union country will be able to release even a portion of the 130 billion euros for the Greeks, if there is no functioning government that respects the rules and manages the disbursed money." German Chancellor Angela Merkel added that "everyone must stick to the things we have agreed. Twenty-five countries have already...signed the fiscal pact," targeting Greece and France, who also had election at the same time. Germany's finance minister Wolfgang Schaeuble also said that "if Greece wants to remain in the eurozone, there is no better solution than the path it has already taken. You can't have one [bailout funds from EU and IMF] without the other [austerity measures to limit the budget deficits]." While Germany's foreign minister Guido Westerwelle finally added that "Germany would like to keep Greece in the eurozone, but whether Greece remains in the eurozone or not lies in its own hands."

== Negotiations by PASOK ==
The Greek newspaper Proto Thema claimed by the dawn of 9 May, that according to an anonymous source, PASOK leader Venizelos had decided he would not even accept the mandate to form a government, but instead straight away ask Papoulias to call a meeting of party leaders. Later the same day, however, after Tsipras announced that he had failed to form a government, Venizelos stated that during the course of the day new unexplored opportunities had emerged, and thus he would now try to form a national unity government within the stipulated three-day period, comprising either: PASOK, New Democracy, SYRIZA and Democratic Left (DIMAR), or in the alternative: PASOK, SYRIZA, DIMAR and Independent Greeks (ANEL) if all parties in that formation agreed to pledge a guarantee on Greece's future course in the euro.

After the first day with Venizelos negotiations, the meeting with DIMAR's Fotis Kouvelis was said to have though of forming a unity government with the purpose of keeping Greece within the European Union and eurozone, while respecting the outcome of the election in regards of also working for the gradual disengagement from the EU-IMF memorandum. According to Kouvelis, such a government should work out its mandate in the time frame until the European elections of 2014. Venizelos stated that: "The discussion we had with Mr Kouvelis was very substantive. Mr Kouvelis set out a specific and responsible proposal. We are very close, it is virtually in line with our suggestion for the creation of a national unity government that seeks to move beyond the memorandum within three years."

A meeting with New Democracy's Antonis Samaras and SYRIZA's Alexis Tsipras was scheduled for 11 May, in order to reveal if the new proposal of a "unity government" could reach a majority support. Before the meetings, DIMAR clarified their support for a "unity government" was conditional, that SYRIZA would also accept to join such a government. The first meeting with New Democracy was constructive, as they unconditionally were willing to participate in the proposed "unity government" with the overall aim "to keep Greece within the European Union and the euro, and to renegotiate the implementation terms of the outlined EU-IMF austerity program". Later the same day, Venizelos met with SYRIZA to learn whether they were ready to join the proposed "unity government" as the fourth party. As SYRIZA opted to turn down the proposal, Venizelos declared late on 11 May that all attempts to form a new government had been exhausted without any result, and that he would now meet with President Karolos Papoulias on 12 May to return his mandate. Venizelos stated that he hoped for all party leaders to act in a more mature and responsible way, when the president invited them for a last meeting and final attempt to form a unity government.

== Negotiations by Papoulias ==
President Karolos Papoulias called all party leaders to a meeting on 13 May in a final attempt to form a national unity government. After he had met with all represented parties over the course of the day, he decided to call for a second meeting the next day with the PASOK, ND and DIMAR. Due to SYRIZA's refusal to participate in the government, DIMAR again stated a government without SYRIZA would not have the necessary popular support. DIMAR leader Kouvelis also said that SYRIZA was inclined to want a new election due its expected improved performance; he added that Greece should also "disengage" from the terms of the EU-IMF deal. Ethnos echoed the words saying that "Syriza has opened the way to new elections and this time it will be a sort of referendum [on the bailout]."

On 13 May, Papoulias claimed to have a letter from incumbent interim Prime Minister Lucas Papademos which asserts that the Ministry of Finance would only afford to pay salaries and pensions until the end of June and that Papademos had warned of the urgent need for Greek to recapitalise their liquid assets following large losses in a bond exchange programme that decreased almost a third of the Greek debt of 350 billion euros. Though talks were scheduled to be held on 15 May, DIMAR executive board member Dimitris Hadzisokratis said that it would not join a government that is unrepresentative of "the majority of Greek society. The last thing Greece needs is another round of elections but that is what is going to happen. We have decided that we cannot participate in a government that does not reflect the majority will of Greek society. I say this with a heavy heart. We would have preferred otherwise."

== New election ==
The talks failed on 15 May, with an early election expected in June. A caretaker cabinet under Council of State president Panagiotis Pikrammenos was appointed on 16 May, and the election date set for 17 June.

At the same time, Papoulias was told by the head of the Bank of Greece George Provopoulos that local financial institutions were concerned about a bank run with the increased rate of withdrawal of euros, which were up to 700 million.
