= Opinion polling for the June 2012 Greek parliamentary election =

In the run up to the June 2012 Greek parliamentary election, various organizations carried out opinion polling to gauge voting intention in Greece during the term of the 14th Hellenic Parliament. Results of such polls are displayed in this article. The date range for these opinion polls is from the previous parliamentary election, held on 6 May 2012, to the days the next elections were held, on 17 June 2012.

Polls are listed in reverse chronological order, showing the most recent first and using the dates when the survey fieldwork was done, as opposed to the date of publication. Where the fieldwork dates are unknown, the date of publication is given instead. The highest percentage figure in each polling survey is displayed with its background shaded in the leading party's colour. If a tie ensues, this is applied to the figures with the highest percentages. The "Lead" columns on the right shows the percentage-point difference between the parties with the highest percentages in a given poll.

== Voting intention estimates ==
The tables below list nationwide voting intention estimates. Refusals are generally excluded from the party vote percentages, while question wording and the treatment of "don't know" responses and those not intending to vote may vary between polling organisations. Polls that show their results without disregarding those respondents who were undecided or said they would abstain from voting (either physically or by voting blank) have been re-calculated by disregarding these numbers from the totals offered through a simple rule of three, in order to obtain results comparable to other polls and the official election results. When available, seat projections are displayed below the percentages in a smaller font. 151 seats were required for an absolute majority in the Hellenic Parliament.

Graphical summary

Local regression trend line of poll results from 6 May to 17 June 2012, with each line corresponding to a political party.

Color key:

Poll conducted after legal ban on opinion polls Exit poll

| Polling firm/Commissioner | Fieldwork date | Sample size | ND | SYRIZA | PASOK | ANEL | KKE | XA | DIMAR | OP | LAOS | DISY | DIXA | Drassi | Lead |
|---|---|---|---|---|---|---|---|---|---|---|---|---|---|---|---|
| June 2012 parliamentary election | 17 Jun 2012 | — | 29.7; 129 | 26.9; 71 | 12.3; 33 | 7.5; 20 | 4.5; 12 | 6.9; 18 | 6.3; 17 | 0.9; 0 | 1.6; 0 | (Note: Within ND.) | 1.6; 0 | (Note: Within DIXA.) | 2.8 |
| Singular Logic (Note: Quick count.) | 17 Jun 2012 (21:30) | ? | 29.6; 129 | 27.1; 72 | 12.2; 32 | 7.6; 20 | 4.5; 12 | 7.0; 18 | 6.3; 17 | – | – | | – | | 2.5 |
| Singular Logic | 17 Jun 2012 (21:00) | ? | 29.5; 128 | 27.1; 72 | 12.3; 33 | 7.6; 20 | 4.5; 12 | 7.0; 18 | 6.2; 17 | – | – | | – | | 2.4 |
| Metron–Alco–Marc–MRB–Opinion | 17 Jun 2012 (20:30) | 7,709 | 28.6– 30.0; 127 | 27.0– 28.4; 72 | 11.0– 12.4; 32 | 6.8– 7.8; 21 | 4.8– 5.6; 13 | 6.5– 7.1; 19 | 5.8– 6.6; 16 | 1.0– 1.5; 0 | 1.5– 2.0; 0 | | 1.5– 2.0; 0 | | 1.6 |
| Metron–Alco–Marc–MRB–Opinion | 17 Jun 2012 (19:00) | 7,709 | 27.5– 30.5 | 27.0– 30.0 | 10.0– 12.0 | 6.0– 7.5 | 5.0– 6.0 | 6.0– 7.5 | 5.5– 6.5 | 1.0– 1.5 | 1.5– 2.0 | | 1.5– 2.0 | | 0.5 |
| Public Issue | 11–14 Jun 2012 | ? | 25.0– 30.0 | 25.0– 30.0 | 11.0– 15.0 | 6.0– 9.0 | 4.0– 7.0 | 4.0– 7.0 | 6.0– 9.0 | – | – | | – | | Tie |
| Public Issue | 1–7 Jun 2012 | ? | 27.0 | 29.5 | 13.5 | 6.5 | 4.0 | 4.0 | 8.5 | – | – | | – | | 2.5 |
| Metron Analysis/ANT1 | 30–31 May 2012 | 1,200 | 27.1; 121 | 26.4; 69 | 13.4; 35 | 6.9; 18 | 5.2; 14 | 4.7; 12 | 8.0; 21 | 1.6; 0 | 1.2; 0 | | 3.6; 10 | | 0.7 |
| Marc/Alpha TV | 29–31 May 2012 | 1,128 | 28.8; 120/134 | 27.0; 66/79 | 13.9; 32/42 | 7.0; 15/22 | 6.3; 13/21 | 4.6; 9/15 | 5.9; 12/19 | 1.1; 0 | 1.1; 0 | | 2.7; 0/10 | | 1.8 |
| Kapa Research/Ta Nea | 29–31 May 2012 | 1,012 | 30.3 | 27.4 | 11.5 | 6.2 | 6.6 | 5.9 | 5.1 | 1.5 | 1.7 | | 1.7 | | 2.9 |
| Rass/Eleftheros Typos | 29–30 May 2012 | 1,202 | 30.0 | 27.4 | 13.7 | 6.6 | 5.9 | 4.1 | 6.1 | 0.9 | 0.8 | | 2.7 | | 2.6 |
| MRB/Real.gr | 29–30 May 2012 | 1,010 | 27.6; 123 | 26.0; 68 | 14.6; 38 | 7.1; 19 | 4.7; 12 | 5.4; 14 | 6.6; 17 | 1.3; 0 | 1.5; 0 | | 3.3; 9 | | 1.6 |
| Data RC/pelop.gr | 28–30 May 2012 | 1,007 | 28.4 | 25.6 | 13.9 | 7.0 | 5.7 | 5.4 | 6.2 | 0.9 | 1.2 | | 2.8 | | 2.8 |
| Alco/NewsIT | 27–30 May 2012 | 1,000 | 28.4 | 25.7 | 14.2 | 7.3 | 5.7 | 5.0 | 5.9 | 1.6 | 1.1 | | 2.5 | | 2.7 |
| Public Issue/Skai–Kathimerini | 25–30 May 2012 | 1,210 | 25.5; 66/68 | 31.5; 132/134 | 13.5; 35/36 | 5.5; 14/15 | 5.5; 14/15 | 4.5; 12 | 7.5; 19/20 | – | – | | 2.5; 0/8 | | 6.0 |
| Pulse RC/To Pontiki | 28–29 May 2012 | 1,615 | 27.0; 71/121 | 27.0; 71/121 | 14.5; 38 | 7.5; 20 | 5.5; 14 | 5.5; 14 | 5.5; 14 | 1.0; 0 | 1.5; 0 | | 3.0; 8 | | Tie |
| VPRC/Epikaira | 25–29 May 2012 | 1,000 | 26.5 | 30.0 | 12.5 | 7.5 | 5.5 | 4.5 | 7.5 | 1.5 | 1.0 | | 2.0 | | 3.5 |
| GPO/Mega TV | 25–29 May 2012 | ? | 26.6; 122 | 25.1; 68 | 15.3; 41 | 8.4; 23 | 6.7; 18 | 4.8; 13 | 5.8; 15 | 0.6; 0 | 2.3; 0 | | 3.0; 0 | | 1.5 |
| Global Link/Pressing | 24–28 May 2012 | ? | 27.0 | 24.1 | 13.3 | 7.8 | 6.7 | 6.6 | 7.0 | 1.7 | 1.4 | | 2.1 | | 2.9 |
| Alco/Proto Thema | 22–25 May 2012 | 1,000 | 28.2 | 25.2 | 15.4 | 7.0 | 6.2 | 5.1 | 5.1 | 1.7 | – | | 3.1 | | 3.0 |
| Pulse RC/Typos tis Kyriakis | 23–24 May 2012 | ? | 26.5 | 26.0 | 15.5 | 7.5 | 5.0 | 5.5 | 5.5 | 1.0 | 1.5 | | 3.0 | | 0.5 |
| Kapa Research/To Vima | 23–24 May 2012 | ? | 28.9 | 22.5 | 14.6 | 6.1 | 7.1 | 5.8 | 5.9 | 2.4 | 2.2 | | 2.7 | | 6.4 |
| Rass/metro | 23–24 May 2012 | 1,003 | 27.6 | 25.1 | 15.3 | 6.8 | 5.6 | 4.4 | 7.3 | 2.1 | 0.9 | | 2.8 | | 2.5 |
| Metron Analysis/ANT1 | 23–24 May 2012 | ? | 27.0; 71 | 27.2; 121 | 14.8; 39 | 7.2; 19 | 5.2; 13 | 4.9; 13 | 6.2; 16 | 1.6; 0 | 1.2; 0 | | 3.0; 8 | | 0.2 |
| Marc/Ethnos | 22–24 May 2012 | 1,075 | 27.7 | 25.5 | 15.2 | 7.7 | 5.5 | 4.4 | 6.3 | 1.8 | 1.7 | | 2.4 | | 2.2 |
| VPRC/Kontra Channel | 22–24 May 2012 | 1,015 | 26.0 | 28.5 | 12.5 | 7.0 | 5.0 | 5.5 | 7.0 | 2.0 | 0.5 | | 3.0 | | 2.5 |
| MRB/Real News | 22–23 May 2012 | 1,002 | 27.1; 121 | 25.6; 67 | 14.7; 38 | 7.7; 20 | 5.2; 14 | 5.2; 13 | 6.1; 16 | 1.1; 0 | 1.1; 0 | | 4.4; 11 | | 1.5 |
| Data RC/pelop.gr | 21–23 May 2012 | 1,019 | 29.4 | 28.8 | 13.3 | 6.6 | 5.8 | 6.4 | 4.1 | 1.4 | 0.4 | | 1.4 | | 0.6 |
| Public Issue/Skai–Kathimerini | 18–23 May 2012 | 1,214 | 26.0 | 30.0 | 15.5 | 8.0 | 5.0 | 4.0 | 6.5 | – | – | | 3.0 | | 4.0 |
| Alco/Proto Thema | 16–18 May 2012 | 1,000 | 26.3 | 24.3 | 15.3 | 8.3 | 5.9 | 4.3 | 6.8 | 1.1 | 1.7 | 1.4 | 1.8 | - | 2.0 |
| Metron Analysis/Crisis Monitor | 16–17 May 2012 | 1,207 | 23.8; 65 | 25.1; 119 | 17.4; 48 | 7.8; 22 | 5.8; 16 | 4.8; 13 | 6.3; 17 | – | 1.8; 0 | – | 2.8; 0 | - | 1.3 |
| MRB/Real News | 16–17 May 2012 | 1,006 | 24.4 | 23.8 | 14.5 | 8.5 | 5.9 | 5.8 | 6.9 | 2.3 | 1.3 | 1.7 | 1.9 | 0.7 | 0.6 |
| Public Issue/Skai–Kathimerini | 15–17 May 2012 | 1,015 | 24.0 | 28.0 | 15.0 | 8.0 | 5.0 | 4.5 | 7.0 | 1.5 | – | – | 3.0 | - | 4.0 |
| Marc/Alpha TV | 15–17 May 2012 | 1,027 | 26.1; 123 | 23.7; 66 | 14.9; 41 | 8.1; 23 | 5.8; 16 | 4.8; 13 | 6.3; 18 | 1.8; 0 | 1.5; 0 | 1.6; 0 | 2.0; 0 | 1.0; 0 | 2.4 |
| Pulse RC/To Pontiki | 15–16 May 2012 | 1,206 | 21.5 | 24.5 | 15.5 | 8.0 | 6.0 | 6.0 | 6.0 | 2.0 | 2.0 | 2.0 | 2.0 | 2.0 | 3.0 |
| Rass/Eleftheros Typos | 14–16 May 2012 | 1,203 | 23.1 | 24.9 | 13.4 | 8.4 | 6.3 | 4.2 | 7.1 | 1.5 | 2.2 | 2.9 | 2.3 | - | 1.8 |
| Rass/Eleftheros Typos | 10–11 May 2012 | 1,002 | 22.4 | 23.7 | 13.6 | 9.0 | 5.5 | 4.4 | 7.2 | 2.1 | 2.3 | 2.8 | 2.7 | - | 1.3 |
| Kapa Research/To Vima | 9–10 May 2012 | 1,007 | 20.3 | 23.0 | 13.7 | 9.2 | 7.3 | 6.5 | 5.6 | 2.8 | 2.7 | 2.8 | 2.5 | 1.5 | 2.7 |
| Metron Analysis/Ependytis | 9–10 May 2012 | ? | 21.7 | 25.5 | 14.6 | 10.5 | 5.3 | 4.7 | 5.4 | 2.6 | 1.8 | 1.9 | 1.8 | 1.6 | 3.8 |
| Marc/Alpha TV | 8–9 May 2012 | 1,021 | 20.3; 57 | 27.7; 128 | 12.6; 36 | 10.2; 29 | 7.0; 20 | 5.7; 16 | 4.9; 14 | 1.7; 0 | 2.3; 0 | 1.5; 0 | 1.8; 0 | 1.5; 0 | 7.4 |
| May 2012 parliamentary election | 6 May 2012 | — | 18.9; 108 | 16.8; 52 | 13.2; 41 | 10.6; 33 | 8.5; 26 | 7.0; 21 | 6.1; 19 | 2.9; 0 | 2.9; 0 | 2.6; 0 | 2.1; 0 | 1.8; 0 | 2.1 |
