= Greek legislative election, 2012 =

The term Greek legislative election, 2012, may refer to:

- May 2012 Greek legislative election
- June 2012 Greek legislative election
