= National Unity (Greece) =

National Unity Εθνική Ενότητα Ethnikí Enótita
- Leader: Giorgos Karatzaferis
- General Secretary: Takis Baltakos
- Founded: 8 April 2016
- Dissolved: late 2016
- Preceded by: Popular Orthodox Rally
- Ideology: Patriotism; Conservatism; Christian democracy
- Political position: Right-wing

National Unity (Greek: Εθνική Ενότητα, romanized: Ethnikí Enótita) was a right-wing Greek political party founded in April 2016 by LAOS leader Giorgos Karatzaferis and the former cabinet secretary and Samaras aide, Takis Baltakos.
