= National Hope =

National Hope Εθνική Ελπίδα
- Leader: Giorgos Papadopoulos
- Founded: 5 July 2010
- Dissolved: 2019
- Ideology: Conservatism; Greek nationalism Monarchism
- Political position: Right-wing to far-right
- Colours: Blue, White
- Parliament: 0 / 300
- European Parliament: 0 / 22
- Regions: 0 / 725

Website
- ethnikielpida.gr

National Hope (Greek: Εθνική Ελπίδα, Ethniki Elpida) was a Greek monarchist political party with no MPs in the Greek Parliament.

== Electoral history ==
The party was banned by the Supreme Court from participating in the elections of May 2012, but were permitted to stand in the June 2012 election, where it received 4,303 votes (0.07%).

In the election of January 2015 and the election of September 2015, the party's participation was rejected for the second and third time.

== Election results ==
=== Hellenic Parliament ===
Election	Hellenic Parliament					Rank	Government	Leader
Election	Votes	%	±pp	Seats won	+/−	Rank	Government	Leader
06/2012	4,290	0.07%	▲0.7	0 / 300	±0	#18	No seats	Yiorgos Papadopoulos
