= Society – Political Party of the Successors of Kapodistrias =

Society Κοινωνία
- Leader: Michalis Iliadis
- Founder: Emmanuel Voloudakis
- Founded: 24 January 2008
- Dissolved: 14 July 2020
- Ideology: Kapodistrism; Conservatism; Patriotism
- Political position: Centre-right to right-wing

Website
- www.koinwnia.com (archived)

The Society – Political Party of the Successors of Kapodistrias (Greek: Κοινωνία - Πολιτική παράταξη συνεχιστών του Καποδίστρια) was a Greek political party headed by Michalis Iliadis. It was founded in 2008 by Emmanouil Voloudakis and first participated in the European Parliament election in 2009 with a score of 0.16%. In the 2010 Greek local elections the party supported the Society of Athens for the municipality of Athens. The party dissolved on July 13, 2020.

The party's name referred to Ioannis Kapodistrias.

== Electoral results ==
Results, 2009–2012 (year links to election page)
| Year | Type of Election | Votes | % | Mandates |
|---|---|---|---|---|
| 2009 | European Parliament | 7,964 | 0.16 | 0 |
| 2009 | Parliament | 10,682 | 0.16 | 0 |
| May 2012 | Parliament | 28,502 | 0.45 | 0 |
| June 2012 | Parliament | 17,771 | 0.29 | 0 |
| 2014 | European Parliament | 34,487 | 0.60 | 0 |
| January 2015 | Parliament | - | - | - |
| September 2015 | Parliament | 35,534 | 0.65 | 0 |
