= Karolos Papoulias =

President of Greece from 2005 to 2015

- Κάρολος Παπούλιας
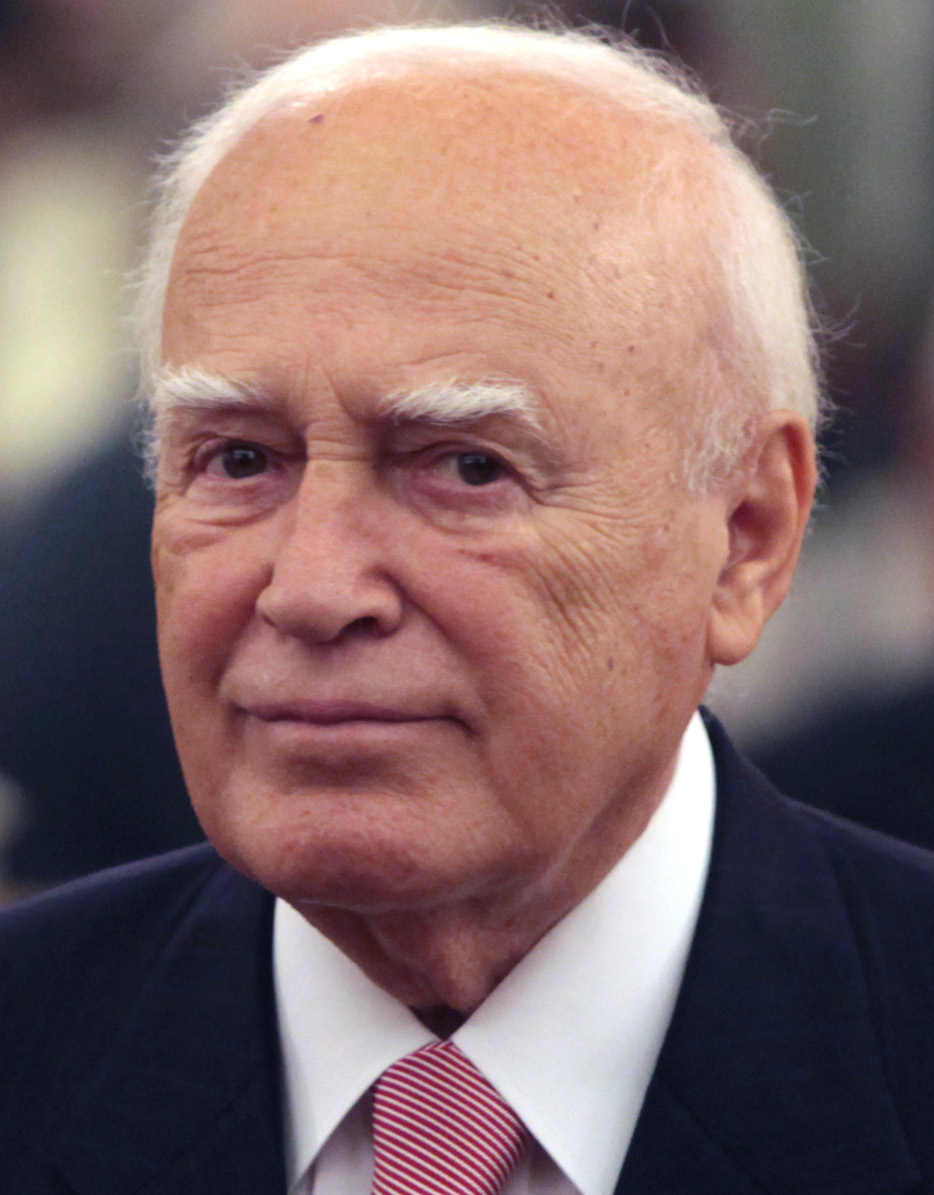
- Papoulias in 2009

President of Greece
- In office 12 March 2005 – 13 March 2015
- Prime Minister: Kostas Karamanlis; George Papandreou; Lucas Papademos; Panayiotis Pikrammenos (caretaker); Antonis Samaras; Alexis Tsipras
- Preceded by: Konstantinos Stephanopoulos
- Succeeded by: Prokopis Pavlopoulos

Minister of Foreign Affairs
- In office 13 October 1993 – 22 January 1996
- Prime Minister: Andreas Papandreou
- Preceded by: Michalis Papakonstantinou
- Succeeded by: Theodoros Pangalos
- In office 26 July 1985 – 2 July 1989
- Prime Minister: Andreas Papandreou
- Preceded by: Ioannis Charalambopoulos
- Succeeded by: Tzannis Tzannetakis

Member of the Hellenic Parliament
- In office 20 November 1977 – 7 March 2004
- Constituency: Ioannina

Personal details
- Born: 4 June 1929 Molyvdoskepastos, Ioannina, Greece
- Died: 26 December 2021 (aged 92) Athens, Greece
- Resting place: Ioannina Island, Greece
- Party: Panhellenic Socialist Movement
- Spouse: Mary Panou
- Children: 3
- Education: University of Athens; University of Milan; University of Cologne

Karolos Papoulias (Greek: Κάρολος Παπούλιας [ˈkarolos paˈpuʎas]; 4 June 1929 – 26 December 2021) was a Greek politician who served as the president of Greece from 2005 to 2015.

A member of the Panhellenic Socialist Movement (PASOK), he previously served as Minister of Foreign Affairs from 1985 to 1989 and again from 1993 until 1996.

== Early life ==
Karolos Papoulias was born in the village of Molyvdoskepastos, Ioannina on 4 June 1929, and was the son of Major General Gregorios Papoulias. He attended primary school in Pogoniani and secondary schools in Pogoniani, Zosimaia School in Ioannina, and in the Paleo Faliro and Pangrati districts of Athens. The Nazi invasion of Greece in April 1941 caught him studying in Pogoniani and Papoulias joined the armed resistance against the Germans. He obtained a law degree from the University of Athens, a master's degree in public international law and international relations from the University of Milan, and a doctorate in private international law from the University of Cologne with a doctoral thesis entitled: "Erwerb und Verlust des unmittelbaren Besitzes im griechishen und deutschen Recht" ("The acquisition and loss of immediate possession in Greek and German law"). He was in West Germany at the time of the 1967 coup d'état and Papoulias headed the organization of the Democratic Socialist Union Abroad, which was responsible for mobilizing Greek workers, students and scientists in Europe against the new junta of the Colonels. He also founded the first trade union organization of the resistance and collaborated with the German broadcaster Deutsche Welle.

Papoulias was an associate of the Munich Institute for Southeast Europe. A onetime pole vault national champion and national volleyball team player, Papoulias was chairman of the National Sports Association. He was also a founding member and president of the Association for the Greek Linguistic Heritage.

Papoulias was active in the left-wing EPON youth as a young man.

== Role in PASOK, parliamentary, and government offices ==
Papoulias was a founding member of the Panhellenic Socialist Movement (PASOK) and a close associate of its leader Andreas Papandreou. From December 1974 on he was continually elected to the PASOK Central Committee. He was also member of the Coordination Council, the Executive Bureau and the Political Secretariat, as well as Secretary of the PASOK International Relations Committee from April 1975 to 1985. For a number of years he was also a member of the Coordinating Committee of the Socialist and Progressive Parties of the Mediterranean.

He was first elected to the Greek Parliament in 1977 for Ioannina, and held his seat continuously through the subsequent legislative elections until his 2004 election as President of the Republic. Under Andreas Papandreou government, Papoulias was deputy Minister for Foreign Affairs, from 1981 to 1985, and from 1985 to 1989 and from 1993 to 1996, Minister of Foreign Affairs. During the ecumenical government of Xenophon Zolotas he served as deputy minister of National Defense between 1989 and 1990. During Costas Simitis' first ministerial term, he was for several years, from 1998 to 2004, president of the Permanent Committee of National Defense and Foreign Affairs.

== Minister for Foreign Affairs: 1985–1989, 1993–1996 ==
In the 1980s, Papoulias played a key role in trying to reach a solution to the Israeli–Palestinian conflict. He mediated a safe departure of trapped Palestinian militants and Yasser Arafat from Lebanon aboard Greek vessels in 1983. He created diplomatic relations with the Arab world and achieved the normalization of relations between Greece and Egypt and the establishment of tripartite cooperation between Iran, Armenia, and Greece. He held talks with a total of 12 Turkish Foreign Ministers to normalize Greco-Turkish relations. This resulted in the signing of the Papoulias-Yılmaz memorandum in 1988.

He supported Turkey's European aspirations conditional on their respect for international law and European Union values.

In his term between 1993 and 1996 and particularly at the crucial Essen Summit he played an important role in starting accession talks between the Republic of Cyprus and the European Union.

As president-in-office of the European Union and member of the contact group for the former Yugoslavia he worked to bring about a resolution of the crisis in Bosnia and Herzegovina. He signed the Interim Agreement with the Former Yugoslav Republic of Macedonia, aiming at the establishment of better relations between that nation and Greece.

He was very interested in relations between Greece and the Balkan states and it was upon his initiative that the first meeting of the Ministers for Foreign Affairs of the Balkans was organized in Belgrade in 1988. There, he began talks with Bulgaria and the then Soviet Union on the Burgas-Alexandroupolis oil pipeline.

He was responsible for the signing of the protocol of mutual civil and military assistance with Bulgaria in the 1980s. He restored friendly and neighbourly relations with Albania by ending the state of war between that country and Greece.

Papoulias was supportive of any step towards détente, peace, and disarmament e.g. the "Initiative of the Six" for peace and disarmament, the participation of Greece in the Conference on Disarmament and Peace in Europe and in the Conference for the Abolition of Chemical Weapons, his proposals to create a nuclear-free zone in the Balkans and the promotion of the idea of making the Mediterranean a sea of peace and cooperation. The JANNINA 1 tripartite cooperation conference, between Greece, Bulgaria, and Romania, was his idea and he was a strong supporter of the Black Sea Conference, which he also chaired.

With his visit to Washington, D.C. in 1985 and the return visit of Secretary of State George Shultz, he revitalized Greek-U.S. relations which had gone through a delicate phase during the previous years.

== Presidency ==
=== First term: 2005–2010 ===
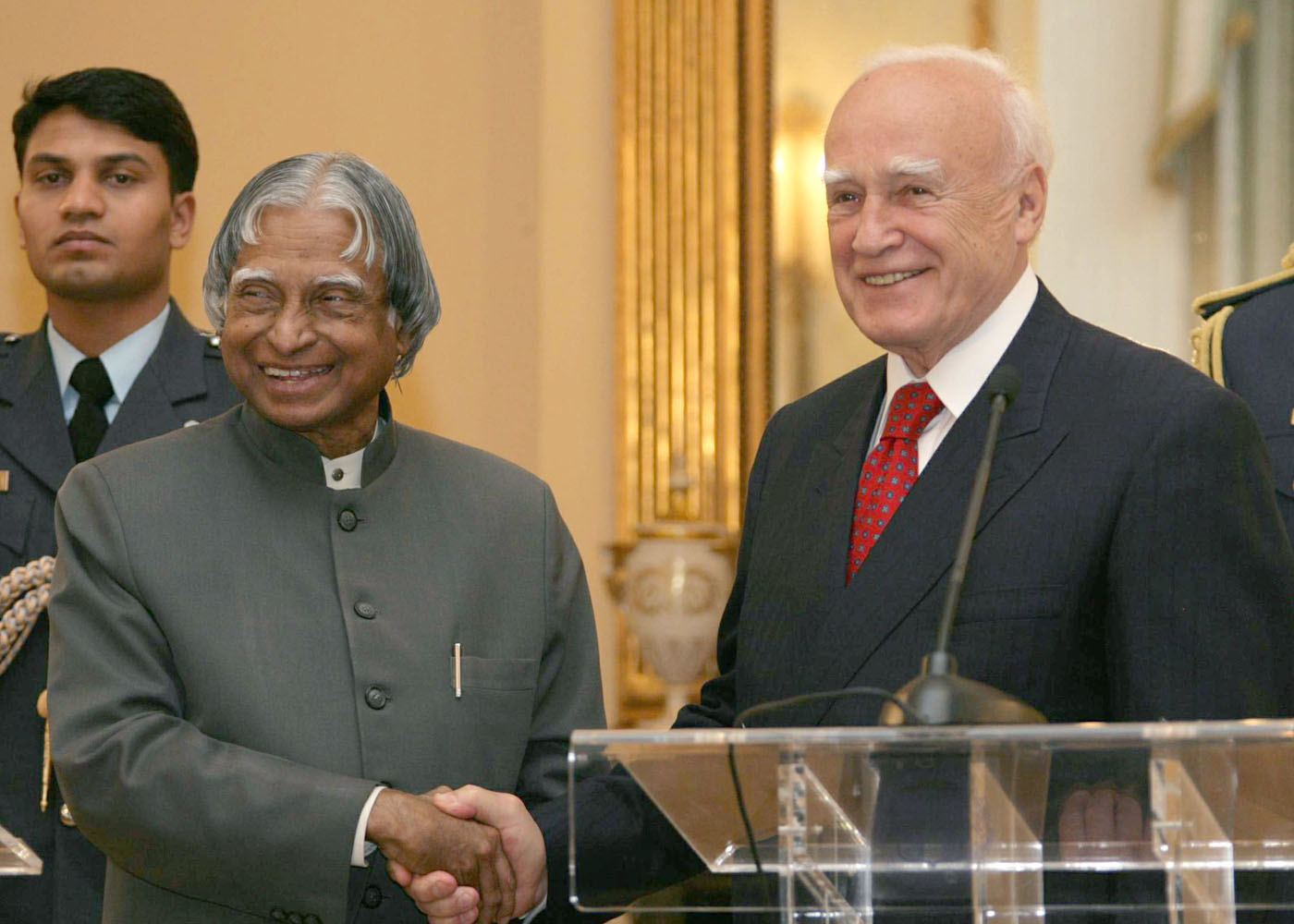
Papoulias with Indian president A. P. J. Abdul Kalam in Athens, 26 April 2007

On 12 December 2004, Prime Minister Kostas Karamanlis, leader of the governing New Democracy party, and George Papandreou, leader of the PASOK opposition, nominated Papoulias for the presidency. That same day Karamanlis made it public in a televised message. In fact, he had already communicated this decision to Papoulias in a phone call on 5 December, as he had been discussing his candidacy with him since the summer. Papoulias won over the other four candidates that PASOK and ND had been negotiating. On 8 February 2005, he was elected by 279 of 300 votes to a five-year term. He was sworn in as the 6th President of the Third Hellenic Republic on 12 March 2005, succeeding Konstantinos Stephanopoulos.

In December 2008, the police killing of a 15-year-old protester, Alexandros Grigoropoulos, sparked four days of riots in Athens. Papoulias called for calm to "honor Alexis' memory peacefully".

At the inauguration of the Acropolis Museum on 20 June 2009, Papoulias demanded the return of the Elgin Marbles from the United Kingdom, which were torn from the Parthenon by the British, because "it is time to heal the wounds of the monument with the return of the marbles that belong to it".

=== Second term: 2010–2015 ===
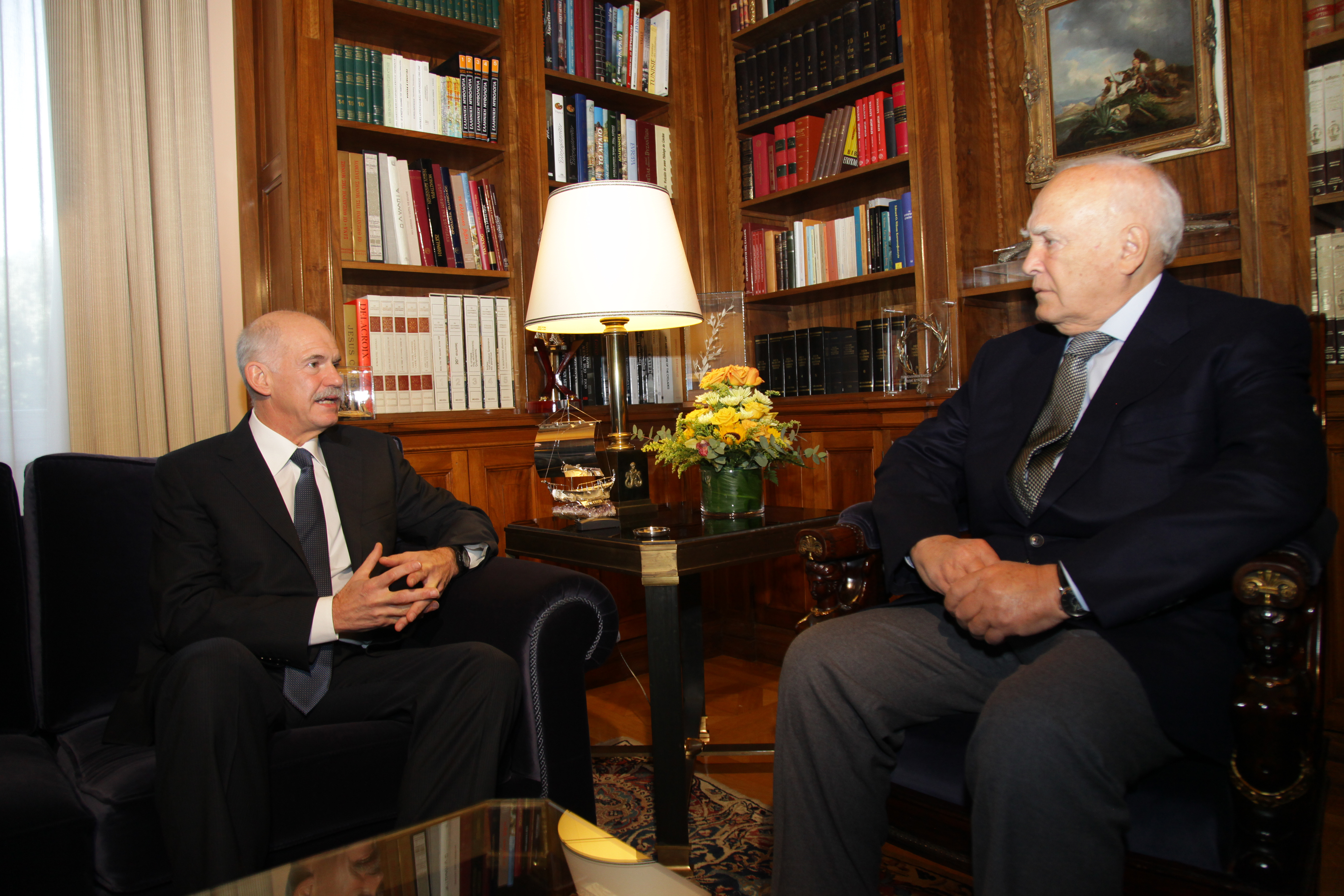
President Karolos Papoulias with Prime Minister George Papandreou on 5 November 2011

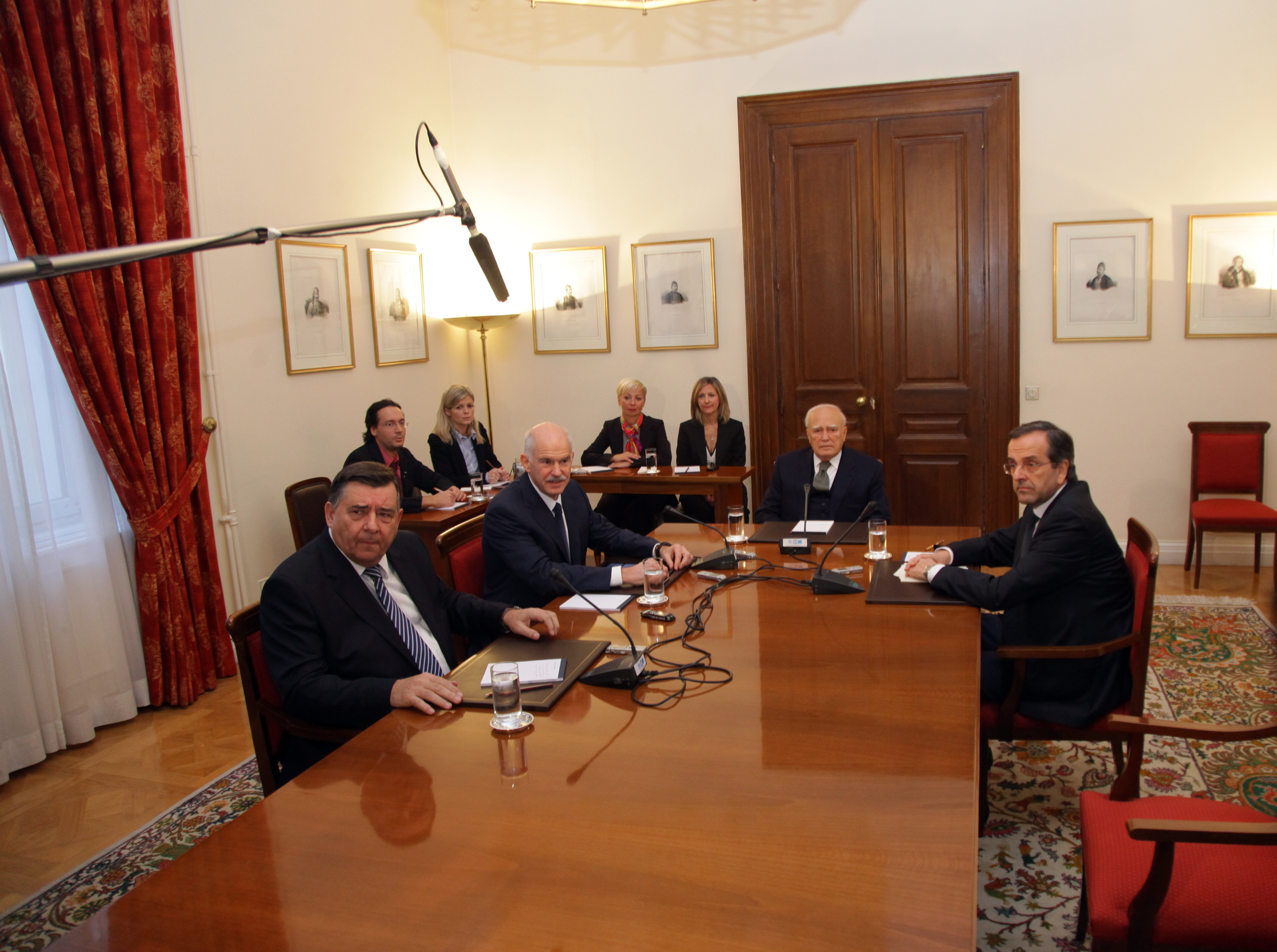
Papoulias in a meeting with Papandreou, Samaras and Georgios Karatzaferis on 10 November 2011.

After securing the support of the two major political parties, Papoulias was re-elected to a second and final term on 3 February 2010 with a parliamentary majority of 266 votes. His second term in office was mired in the country's worsening financial crisis and large demonstrations and protests. This resulted in successive changes of government of different political orientations, with the appointment of conservative, socialist, socialist-conservative and left-wing governments.

Following the government's agreement with the International Monetary Fund on 3 May 2010, Papoulias expressed on 5 May that "our country has reached the limit of disaster" after the general strike that day turned violent and in which three bank workers were killed when the offices were set on fire by protesters.

On 28 October 2011, Greece's national day, protests occurred throughout the country. In Thessaloniki, protesters managed to prevent the annual military parade from taking place and chanted slogans against Papoulias, calling him, among other things, a "traitor" and he was forced to leave the area. On that day Papoulias' emotional statement is remembered, in which he said that "I became a guerrilla when I was fifteen years old to fight against Nazism".

George Papandreou offered Papoulias his resignation as Prime Minister on 5 November 2011 to secure approval of the €130 billion bailout deal, and he appointed Lucas Papademos as his caretaker successor on 10 November. Papademos resigned few months after, in April 2012 and asked Papoulias to dissolve the Parliament and call for a snap election, scheduled for 6 May of that year.

On 15 February 2012 Papoulias resigned his salary as president. A few months later it was revealed that his salary was not withdrawn, but decreased.

That same month, when Wolfgang Schäuble, the German finance minister, said that Greece should delay its elections and install a technocratic government, Papoulias replied that "we are all obliged to work hard to overcome this crisis, but we cannot accept Mr. Schäuble's insults. Who is Mr. Schäuble to insult Greece? Who are these Dutch? who are these Finns? We have always defended not only the freedom of our country, but the freedom of Europe".

After no party won an absolute majority of seats in the May 2012 legislative election, Papoulias called all party leaders to a meeting on 13 May following the terms of section 37 of the constitution, in a final attempt to form a national unity government. After he had met with all represented parties over the course of the day, he decided to call for a second meeting the next day with the PASOK, ND and DIMAR. The talks failed on 15 May, with an early election expected in June. So Papopulias appointed a caretaker cabinet under Council of State president Panayiotis Pikrammenos on 16 May, and the election date set for 17 June. At the same time, Papoulias was told by the head of the Bank of Greece George Provopoulos that local financial institutions were concerned about a bank run with the increased rate of withdrawal of euros, which were up to 700 million. Papoulias stated that "there is, of course, no panic, but there is fear that could develop into panic" acknowledging that Greeks on 14 May had withdrawn 800 million euros from the country's banking system.

With the victory of ND leader Antonis Samaras in the elections, Papoulias tasked him to form a government. On 20 June he invested Samaras as the new Prime Minister.

The murder of rapper and anti-fascist Pavlos Fyssas in September 2013 by a Golden Dawn neo-fascist sparked a wave of outrage in Greece and Papoulias stated that "it's my supreme duty as president of the republic to defend democracy and the Greek people from the storm that is approaching" and protect Greeks from neo-fascism. In 2014, during an official visit by German President Joachim Gauck Papoulias demanded that talks be scheduled as soon as possible on Greek claims for war reparations for the brutal German occupation during World War II.

His presidential term ended in March 2015 and he was replaced by Prokopis Pavlopoulos, who was elected Greece's new president in a parliamentary vote in February 2015.

== Personal life and death ==
Papoulias was married to Mary Panou and together, they had three daughters. Apart from his native Greek, he also spoke English, German, French as well as Italian fluently.

He died on 26 December 2021 in Athens at the age of 92. The Greek government announced three days of national mourning on 27–29 December with flags down to half-mast. His state funeral took place on 29 December at the church of Agios Spyridon in Pagrati and was attended by the country's highest authorities. The following day he was buried on the island of Lake Ioannina.

== Honours ==
Arms as knight of the Royal Order of the Seraphim (Sweden)

- Grand Cross of the Order of Prince Henry (Portugal, 1983)
- Second Class of the Order of Polonia Restituta (Poland, 1995)
- Jubilee Medal "60 Years of Victory in the Great Patriotic War 1941–1945" (Russia, 2005)
- Grand Star of the Decoration of Honour for Services to the Republic of Austria (Austria, 2007)
- Grand Cross of the Grand Order of King Tomislav (Croatia, 2007)
- Knight of the Order of the Elephant (Denmark, 2006)
- Knight Grand Cross with Grand Cordon of the Order of Merit of the Italian Republic (Italy, 2006)
- Knight of the Order of the Seraphim (Sweden, 2008)
- Grand Cross with Collar of the Order of the White Rose of Finland (Finland, 2009)
- Knight of the Order of the White Eagle (Poland, 2013)
- Order of the Republic of Serbia (Serbia, 2013)

Political offices
Preceded by Ioannis Charalambopoulos	Minister of Foreign Affairs; 1985–1989	Succeeded by Tzannis Tzannetakis
Preceded by Michalis Papakonstantinou	Minister of Foreign Affairs; 1993–1996	Succeeded by Theodoros Pangalos
Preceded by Konstantinos Stephanopoulos	President of Greece; 2005–2015	Succeeded by Prokopis Pavlopoulos
