= Nikolaos Salavrakos =

Greek politician

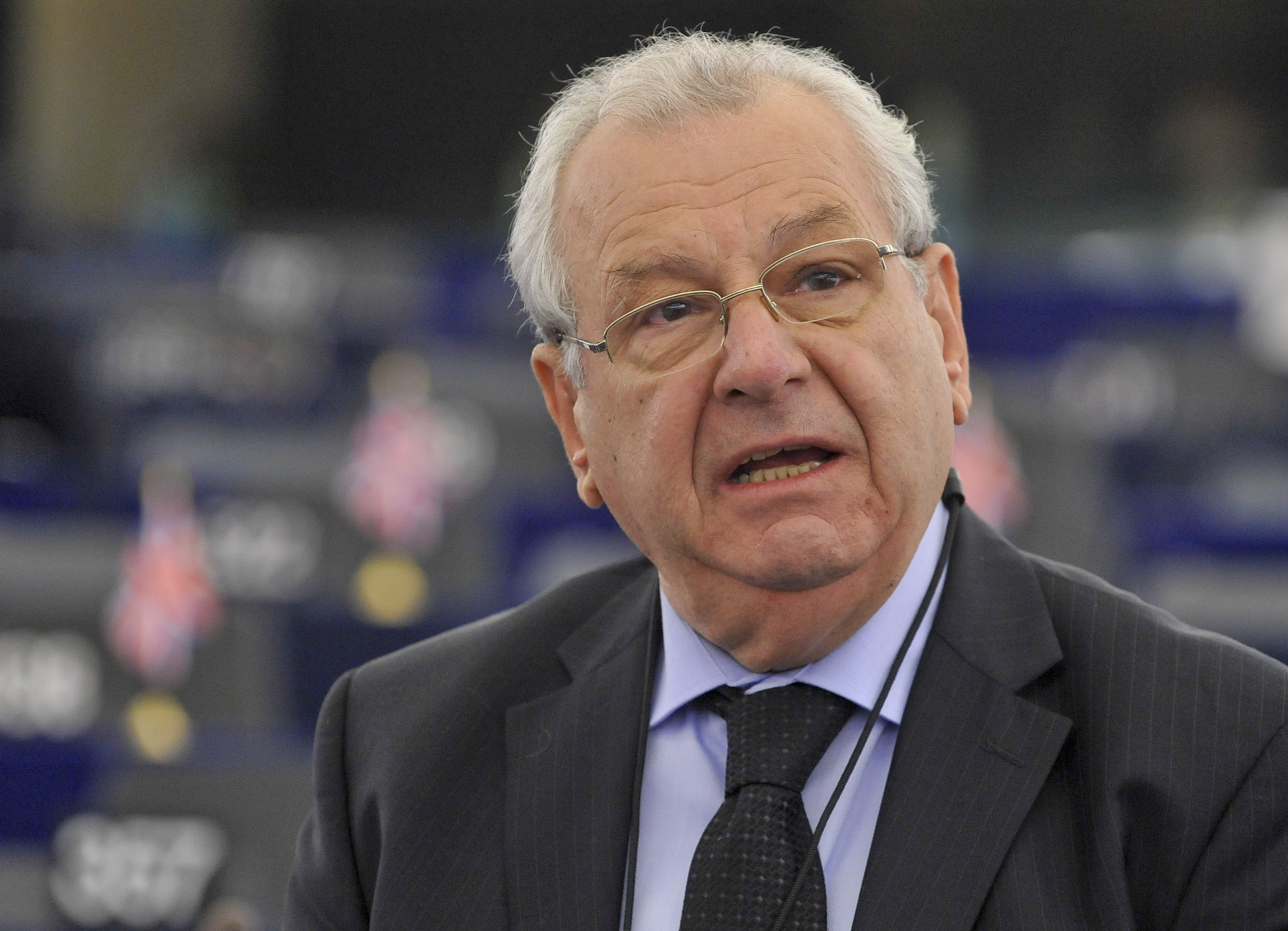
Nikolaos Salavrakos

Nikolaos Salavrakos (Greek: Νικόλαος Σαλαβράκος; born 15 February 1946 in Kalamata) is a Greek politician who was a Member of the European Parliament (MEP) from 2009 to 2014, representing the Popular Orthodox Rally. In 2019, he became president of the party.
