= Panayiotis Pikrammenos =

Greek judge and politician

- Παναγιώτης Πικραμμένος
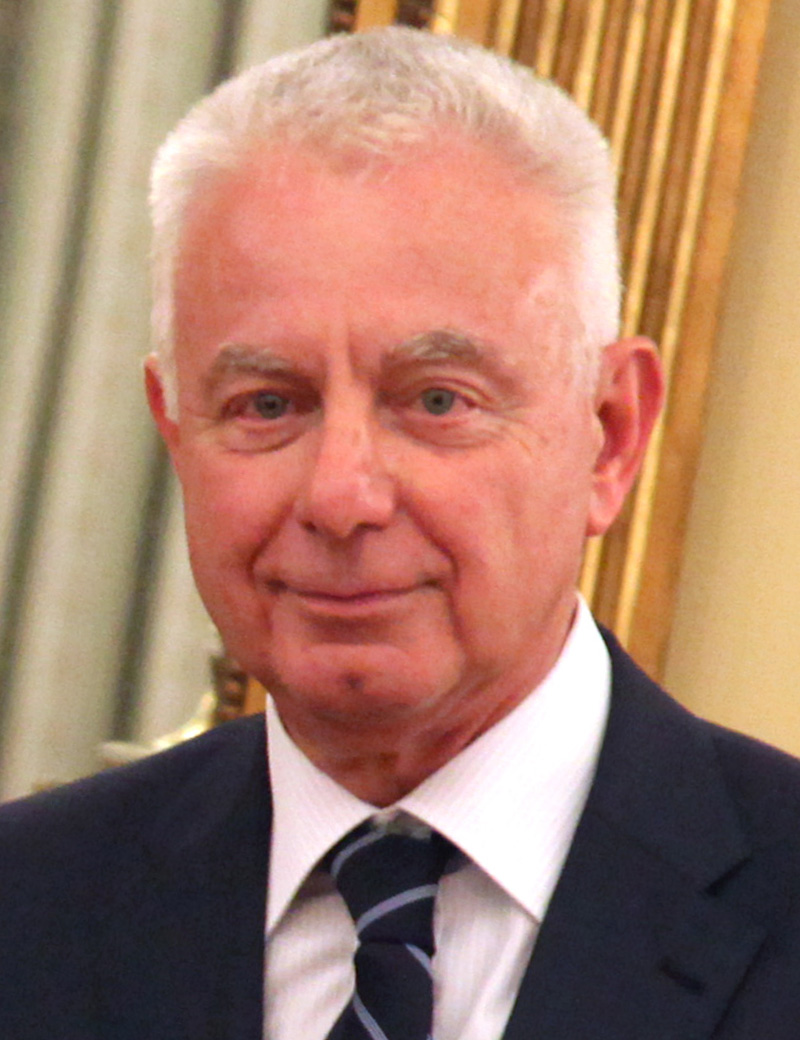
- Pikrammenos in 2012

Prime Minister of Greece
- Caretaker; 16 May 2012 – 20 June 2012
- President: Karolos Papoulias
- Preceded by: Lucas Papademos
- Succeeded by: Antonis Samaras

Deputy Prime Minister of Greece
- In office 9 July 2019 – 25 May 2023
- Prime Minister: Kyriakos Mitsotakis
- Preceded by: Yannis Dragasakis
- Succeeded by: Kostis Hatzidakis (2025)

Council of State
- 2007–2009: Vice President
- 2009–2012: President

Personal details
- Born: 26 July 1945 (age 81) Athens, Greece
- Party: New Democracy (2019-present); Independent (until 2019)
- Spouse: Athina Noutsou
- Children: 1 daughter
- Education: University of Athens; Panthéon-Assas University

Panayiotis Pikrammenos (Greek: Παναγιώτης Πικραμμένος, pronounced [panaˈʝotis pikraˈmenos]; born 1945) is a Greek judge and politician who served as the Deputy Prime Minister of Greece from 2019 to 2023.

He briefly served as caretaker prime minister from 16 May 2012 to 20 June 2012, after the legislative election in May 2012 resulted in an absence of majority.

== Early life and education ==
Panagyiotis Pikrammenos was born on 26 July 1945, in Athens, to father Othon Pikrammenos, a native of Patras and owner of a printed-press distribution agency, (Note: Othon Pikrammenos inherited from his father Panayiotis "Takis" Pikrammenos the "Greek and Foreign Press Company" printed-press distribution agency, established in 1920. See San Simera. During the occupation of Greece by the Axis powers, the German state-propaganda agency Mundus became controlling partner to the distribution agency, through which German propaganda was channeled throughout Greece. See Koukounas, Demosthenes (2012). Η Eλληνική οικονομία κατά την Κατοχή και η αλήθεια για τα κατοχικά δάνεια [The Greek economy during the Occupation and the truth about the Occupations Loans] (in Greek). Erodios. ISBN 9789604541270. For the German state company Mundus, see Egbert, Lawrence Deems, ed. (1947). "Trial of the Major War Criminals before the International Military Tribunal" (PDF). International Military Tribunal Record. Nuremberg, Germany: United States Army.) and to mother Thalia Christidou, daughter of a Geneva-based physician.

Pikrammenos graduated from the German School of Athens in 1963 and from the Athens Law School in 1968. His postgraduate studies were at the Panthéon-Assas University, wherefrom he obtained his Doctorat d'État in Public Law.

== In the judiciary ==
He began working as a lawyer in Athens and London until he successfully entered the examination for the position of rapporteur to the Council of State in 1976. He was promoted to associate judge in 1981. He served as general manager of the National School of Judges from 2005 to 2009, during which time he had become Vice President of the Council of State.

He was appointed Council of State President in 2009, resigning his position at the school of Judges. (Note: Shortly after he was appointed President of the Council of State, an explosive device was placed under his car by what police believed to be an anarchist group. See "Anarchist Group Suspected in Arson Attack on Top Greek Judge's Car". Fox News. Associated Press. 2 July 2009.)

Pikrammenos served in numerous legislative committees for the Ministry of Justice, while, from 1991 to 1993, he was a special advisor on judicial affairs to prime minister Konstantinos Mitsotakis.

Pikrammenos retired as Council of State and from the judiciary corps in June 2012.

== Acting Prime Minister of Greece ==
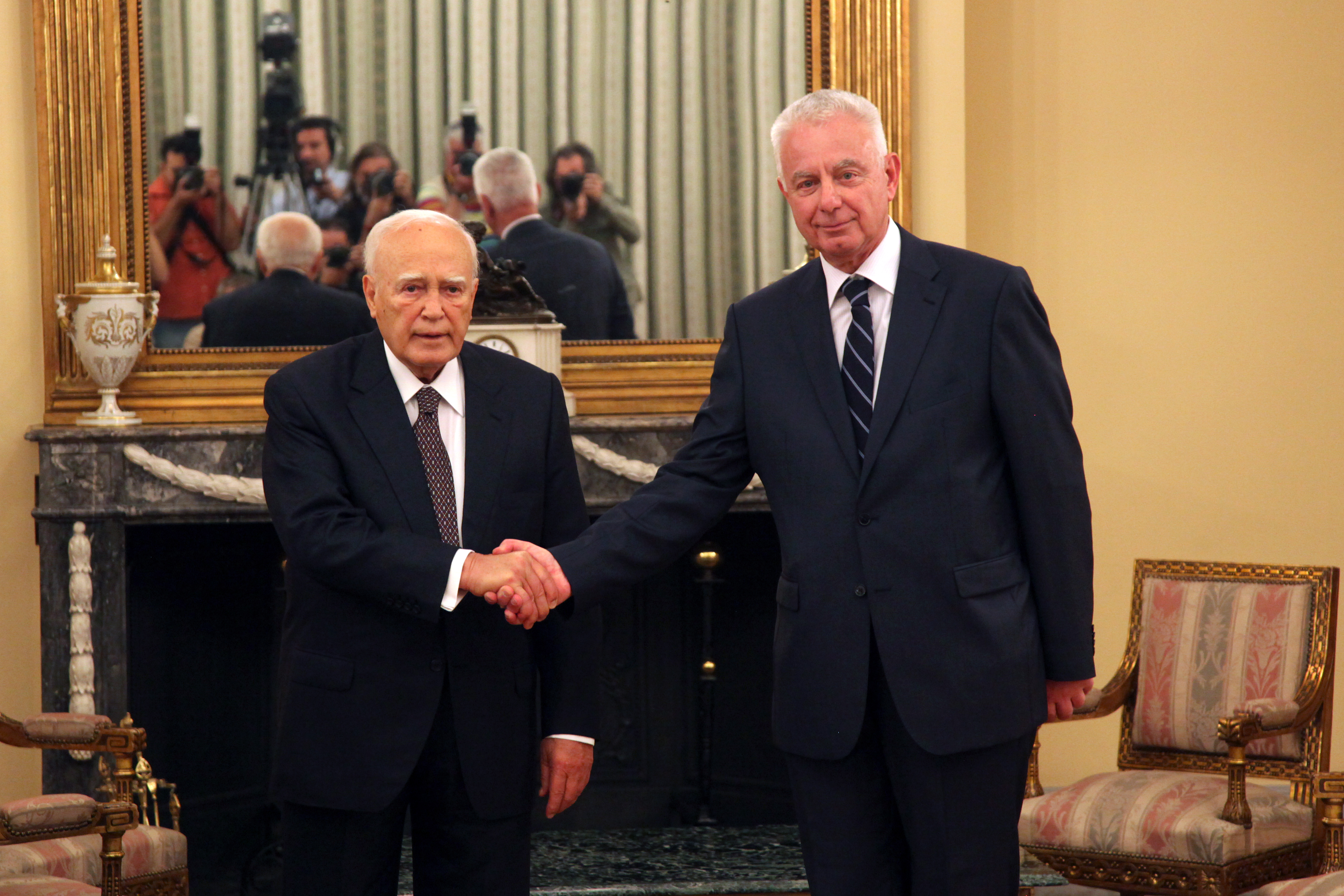
Pikrammenos (r.) being sworn in by Greek President Karolos Papoulias on 16 May 2012

Following the failure to form a government after the 6 May general elections, he was appointed caretaker prime minister by President Karolos Papoulias on 16 May 2012. His appointment was decided by the Greek President after the three major parties, New Democracy, PASOK, and Syriza, failed to agree on a person.

Pikrammenos led a government of technocrats in the run-up to the 17 June general election, after which a coalition government between New Democracy and PASOK was formed, with also the "conditional support" of the small Democratic Left party.

== Μember of Parliament ==
As a candidate for the New Democracy party in the general election of 2019, he was placed atop the list of national candidates and elected member of parliament. From July 2019 to 25 May 2023, he served as vice deputy prime minister in the Kyriakos Mitsotakis government. In April 2023, he stated that after his parliamentary term expires, he will no longer be an MP candidate.

== Accolades ==
Ιn 2024, Pikrammenos was awarded an honorary doctorate in Law by his alma mater, the Athens Law School. The subject of his acceptance speech was the question of the highest judicial court in the land, the Council of the State, as a political factor.

== Ideological and political positions ==
He has supported the right of homosexual couples to marry, speaking, as he stated in 2023, as a "logical and free human being more than as a lawyer." He added that he does not object to gay couples having or adopting children, though he accepts, as he said, that the issue is "controversial" and might not have been adequately studied yet. (Note: The adoption of children by same-sex couples is legal in Greece.)

Pikrammenos attended the funeral ceremony of former King Constantine II of Greece on 16 January 2023, held in the Tatoi estate, as a representative of the Greek government.

== Controversies ==
His name was implicated in the allegations that the Swiss multinational pharmaceutical corporation Novartis had bribed government officials in Greece. The company had been charged in 2018 with various criminal and civil offenses by the US Department of Justice, involving the bribery of doctors, hospitals, and clinics to prescribe their drugs and use their surgical products. The company eventually came to an agreement with the American law enforcement authorities, in 2020, to pay more than $346 million to resolve all the criminal and civil charges brought against it in the United States. In Greece, where Novartis maintains a long presence, the Ministry of Justice also began investigating its actions since 2016, and, in 2018, submitted to the prosecution authorities an indictment proposal, mainly based on the testimony of unnamed, protected witnesses, to indict ten major political figures active during the period 2006–2015, including Pikrammenos. In 2020, the indictment proposal was shelved due to "lack of evidence," and Pikrammenos stated he's satisfied that the "ridiculous" accusations against him, which, as a lawyer, found to be even "very badly written," had collapsed. In 2024, Alexis Tsipras, during whose term as prime minister the indictments were proposed, stated that his government's "management of the Novartis affair was unfortunate," and resulted in alienating potential political allies at a time when they were "strongly" in need of alliances.

== Personal life ==
He is married to Athina Noutsou and they have a daughter, Carolina. His hobbies include sea diving and motorcycle rides.

== Notes ==
Legal offices
Preceded by Georgios Panagiotopoulos	President of the Council of State; 2009–2012	Succeeded by Kostas Menoudakos
Political offices
Preceded by Lucas Papademos	Prime Minister of Greece; Caretaker; 2012	Succeeded by Antonis Samaras
Preceded by Yannis Dragasakis	Deputy Prime Minister of Greece; 2019–2023	Vacant Title next held by Kostis Hatzidakis
