= June 2012 Greek parliamentary election =

- 17 June 2012

All 300 seats in the Hellenic Parliament 151 seats needed for a majority
- Opinion polls
- Registered: 9,947,876
- Turnout: 62.49% (▼2.63pp)
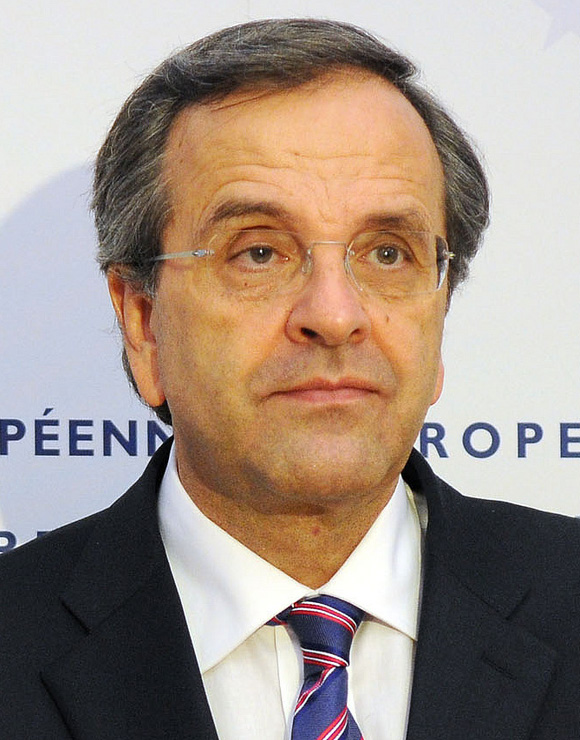

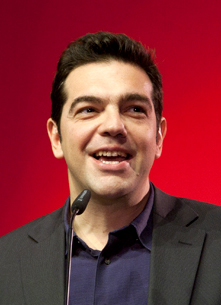

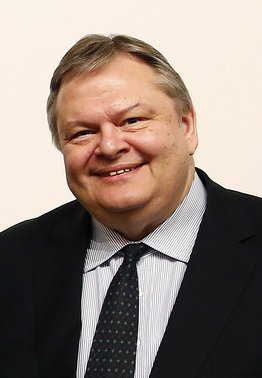

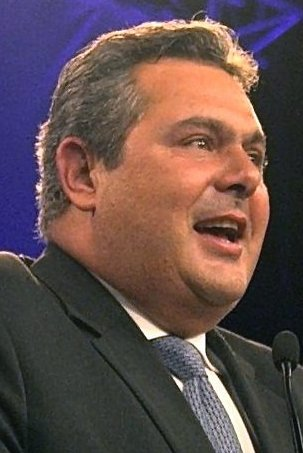

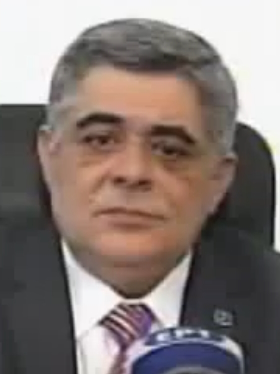

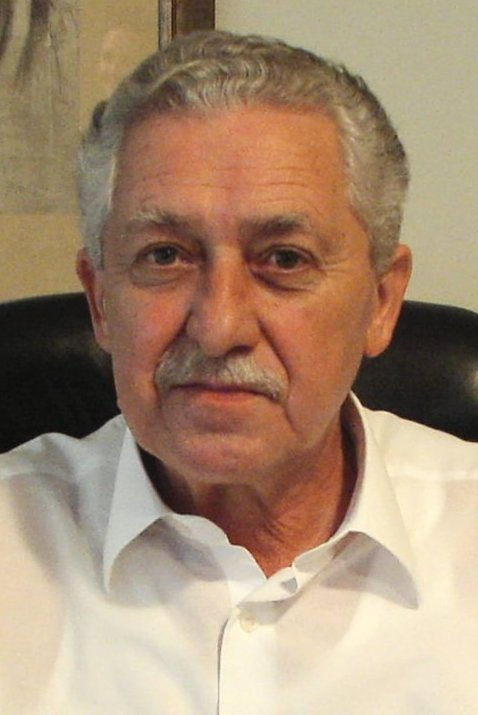

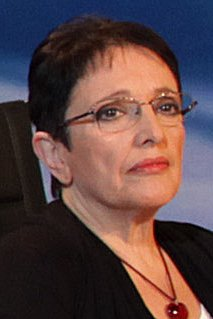
	First party	Second party	Third party
Leader	Antonis Samaras	Alexis Tsipras	Evangelos Venizelos
Party	ND	Syriza	PASOK
Last election	18.85%, 108 seats	16.78%, 52 seats	13.18%, 41 seats
Seats won	129	71	33
Seat change	▲21	▲19	▼8
Popular vote	1,825,497	1,655,022	756,024
Percentage	29.66%	26.89%	12.28%
Swing	▲10.81pp	▲10.11pp	▼0.90pp
	Fourth party	Fifth party	Sixth party
Leader	Panos Kammenos	Nikolaos Michaloliakos	Fotis Kouvelis
Party	ANEL	ΧΑ	DIMAR
Last election	10.61%, 33 seats	6.97%, 21 seats	6.11%, 19 seats
Seats won	20	18	17
Seat change	▼13	▼3	▼2
Popular vote	462,406	426,025	384,986
Percentage	7.51%	6.92%	6.25%
Swing	▼3.10pp	▼0.05pp	▲0.14pp
	Seventh party
Leader	Aleka Papariga
Party	KKE
Last election	8.47%, 26 seats
Seats won	12
Seat change	▼14
Popular vote	277,227
Percentage	4.50%
Swing	▼3.95pp
- Results by constituency
Interim Prime Minister before election
Panayiotis Pikrammenos
Independent
Prime Minister after election
Antonis Samaras
ND

Parliamentary elections were held in Greece on Sunday, 17 June 2012, to elect all 300 members to the Hellenic Parliament in accordance with the constitution, after all attempts to form a new government failed following the May elections. If all attempts to form a new government fail, the constitution directs the president to dissolve a newly elected parliament, and then to call for new parliamentary elections within 30 days of the dissolution. The president announced at 16 May the date for the new election, and signed the formal decree to dissolve the parliament and call for the election at 19 May.

Compared to the previous elections a month earlier, the centre-right New Democracy and left-wing Syriza made significant gains to the detriment of all other parties. ND remained the largest party with 30% of the vote, while Syriza consolidated its gains and took 27%. Centre-left PASOK, which had suffered crushing losses in the previous election in May, failed to make any recovery. The right-wing populist Independent Greeks (ANEL) and Communist Party of Greece (KKE) declined, while the far-right Golden Dawn (XA) and the Democratic Left (DIMAR) stayed static in terms of vote share, though both lost seats.

No party achieved the 151 seats needed for an overall majority, though New Democracy held a strong plurality of 43% thanks to Greece's majority bonus system. As outlined by the constitution, the largest party led the first negotiations to try to form a new government. ND leader Antonis Samaras invited all elected parties to participate in a unity government which, while respecting the existing bailout agreement ratified in February 2012, would attempt to renegotiate the austerity terms of the agreement as its highest priority. Syriza rejected participation, but Samaras was ultimately able to form a coalition comprising ND, PASOK, and DIMAR on 20 June. He became Prime Minister in a cabinet of New Democracy politicians and several independent technocrats, two of whom were nominated by DIMAR, while PASOK chose to remain outside cabinet.

== Background ==
By section 37 of the constitution, the President of the Republic will consecutively give the leaders of the three largest parties in parliament an exploratory mandate to set up a government within three days, until one leader succeeds. If none does, "the President of the Republic shall summon all party leaders, and if the impossibility to form a Cabinet enjoying the confidence of the Parliament is confirmed, he shall attempt to form a Cabinet composed of all parties in Parliament for the purpose of holding parliamentary elections. If this fails, he shall entrust the President of the Supreme Administrative Court or of the Supreme Civil and Criminal Court or of the Court of Auditors to form a Cabinet as widely accepted as possible to carry out elections and dissolve Parliament."

=== May election ===
In the 6 May election, no party won an absolute majority of seats. President Karolos Papoulias, in accordance with the constitution, offered successive exploratory mandates to the leaders of the three largest parties: Antonis Samaras of New Democracy (ND), Alexis Tsipras of the Coalition of the Radical Left (SYRIZA), and Evangelos Venizelos of PASOK. Each in turn failed to form a government and returned their mandates to the president.

On 13 May, the president followed the terms of section 37 of the constitution and met with all party leaders to find a way of forming a majority government. After concluding on the eve of 14 May that it was impossible to form a new ordinary political government, in a last-ditch effort the president asked all the elected political leaders on 15 May if they could support the establishment of a "technocratic" government for a limited term, to guide Greece safely through its economic crisis. After this attempt also failed, he asked on 16 May, in full compliance with the constitution, for a caretaker cabinet under Council of State president Panayiotis Pikrammenos to be appointed, and to dissolve parliament and hold new elections on 17 June. The formal decree to dissolve the newly elected parliament and call for new elections was jointly signed by President Karolos Papoulias and caretaker Prime Minister Panayiotis Pikrammenos at 19 May, to fully comply with the 30-day constitutional rule.

German Finance Minister Wolfgang Schäuble said the election would be a referendum on Greece's continuation as a member of the eurozone. "If Greece—and this is the will of the great majority—wants to stay in the euro, then they have to accept the conditions," he said. "Otherwise it isn't possible. No responsible candidate can hide that from the electorate." Parallels were also drawn to the proposed Greek economy referendum, with suggestion that the two 2012 elections were a de facto referendum.

== Incumbent parliament ==
Seven parties were elected at the May 2012 election, but this parliament was short-lived because a coalition government could not be formed; fresh elections were called.

Distribution of seats in parliament	May 2012 Greek parliamentary election
Official parties
New Democracy (ND)	108
Syriza	52
PASOK	41
Independent Greeks (ANEL)	33
Communist Party of Greece (KKE)	26
Golden Dawn (XA)	21
Democratic Left (DIMAR)	19

== Participating parties ==
A total of 30 parties applied to participate in the June 2012 election. However, along with the approval of 58 independent candidates, the Supreme Court of Greece only granted an approval to participate for the following 21 parties (sorted by their size of votes in the previous election):

1. New Democracy (ND), Antonis Samaras
2. Syriza, Alexis Tsipras
3. PASOK, Evangelos Venizelos
4. Independent Greeks (ANEL), Panos Kammenos
5. Golden Dawn (XA), Nikolaos Michaloliakos
6. Communist Party of Greece (KKE), Aleka Papariga
7. Democratic Left (DIMAR), Fotis Kouvelis
8. Recreate Greece – Action – Liberal Alliance (DX-DRASI-FS), Thanos Tzimeros, Stefanos Manos and Grigoris Vallianatos
9. Ecologists Greens (OP), six-member committee
10. Popular Orthodox Rally (LAOS), Yiorgos Karatzaferis
11. Anticapitalist Left Cooperation for the Overthrow -Front of anticapitalist, revolutionary, communist and radical Left Ecology (ANTARSYA), 21-member committee
12. I Don't Pay Movement, Vasilis Papadopoulos
13. Union of Centrists (EK), Vassilis Leventis
14. Pirate Party of Greece (KPE), I. Panagopoulos
15. Society-Political Party of the Successors of Kapodistria, Michail Iliadis
16. Communist Party of Greece (Marxist-Leninist) / Marxist-Leninist Communist Party of Greece (KKE(M–L) / ML KKE), four-member committee
17. Liberal Party (LIBERTAS), Manolis Kaligiannis
18. National Resistance Movement (KEAN), Ippokratis Savvouras (sole candidate)
19. Renewing Independent Left, Renewing Right, Renewing Pasok, Renewing New Democracy, No to War, Party of Action, I Give Away Land, I Pardon Debts, I Save Lives, Panagrarian Labour Movement of Greece (PAEKE), Miltiadis Tzalazidis (sole perennial candidate)
20. Panathinaikos Movement (PANKI), Yiorgos Betsikas (one of only two candidates)
21. National Hope, G. Papadopoulos

=== Rejected parties ===
The following 9 parties were for various reasons not approved by the Supreme Court:

1. Regional Urban Development (PAA), Nikolos Kolitsis *(will instead campaign as a single independent candidate)
2. Tyrannomachoi, Athanasios Daskalopoulos *(will instead campaign as a single independent candidate)
3. Greek Vision, Anastasios Tsaneklidis *(will instead campaign as a single independent candidate)
4. Greek White Movement Today's Ideology (ELKSI), Eleftherios Daniilidis *(will instead campaign as a single independent candidate)
5. New Salvation Christian Democracy Party, A. Stoilis
6. Citizens Assembly – Greek Confederacy with Direct Democracy in Action, coalition of independent candidates, G. Kokkas
7. Popular Associations Partisan Social Groups (LEYKO), Konstantinos Ntalios
8. PAME in GESEEP, Theod. Kyragiannis
9. Greek Free Joining (EES), D. Michakis

=== Parties declining to participate ===
Compared with the May 2012 election, and in addition to the unapproved parties above, the following nine parties are not participating in the June 2012 election (in order of the size of their vote in the previous election):

1. Democratic Alliance (DISY), opting to merge with ND on 22 May.
2. Social Agreement (KOISY), Louka Katseli
3. No: The coalition of Democratic Revival and United Popular Front (EPAM), Stelios Papathemelis and 3-member committee
4. National Unity Association (SEE), N. Alikakos
5. Workers Revolutionary Party (EEK), Sabetai Matsas
6. Organisation for the Reconstruction of the Communist Party of Greece (OAKKE), 3-member committee
7. Organisation of Communist Internationalists of Greece (OKDE), 3-member committee
8. Dignity, alliance of independent candidates, Panayiotis Theodoropoulos
9. Greek Ecologists, Dimosthenis Vergis

== Procedure ==
Voting is mandatory; however none of the legally existing penalties or sanctions have ever been enforced. 250 seats will be distributed on the basis of proportional representation, with a threshold of 3% required for entry into parliament. The other 50 seats will be awarded to the party that wins a plurality of votes, with coalitions in that regard not being counted as an overall party but having their votes counted separately for each party in the coalition, according to the election law. Parliamentary majority is achieved by a party or coalition of parties that command at least one half plus one (151 out of 300) of total seats. Blank and invalid votes, as well as votes cast for parties that fall short of the 3% threshold, are disregarded for seat allocation purposes.

== Opinion polls ==
Local regression trend line of poll results from 6 May to 17 June 2012, with each line corresponding to a political party.

Most of the early polls conducted during the 10 days after the election at 6 May—where the political leaders unsuccessfully attempted to form a new government—showed SYRIZA taking the lead in popular support ahead of ND. This led to accusations from the political leaders at ND, PASOK and DIMAR, that SYRIZA deliberately had derailed all attempts to form a new government, with the sole purpose of pursuing their own interest of possibly growing in size after a new election. After the new June election was officially called at 16 May, there was an apparent change in political momentum, with most of the subsequent opinion polls now indicating that ND had taken the lead in popular support ahead of SYRIZA. According to Greek law, the polling companies were not allowed to publish additional opinion polls after the last working day two weeks ahead of the election, meaning that the last opinion polls were published at 1 June. Among all of the last published opinion polls, 9 out of 12 polling companies measured a lead of popular support for ND, while only the two polling companies, VPRC and Public Issue (who both adjust their vote results by performing a weighted prediction of the likely votes of undecided voters based on Time Series Analysis) believed the current lead of popular support belonged to SYRIZA, and the last polling company Pulse RC predicted it would end up with a draw.

According to Greek law, opinion polls are not allowed to be published after the last working day two weeks ahead of the official election day, and as a result the last date to publish a poll was 1 June 2012. However, the polling companies are still allowed to conduct opinion polls during the last two weeks of the election campaign for research purpose, as long as the results remain unpublished and secret. Greek banking stocks were up 20% on Thursday 15 June 2012, on reports that a secret poll had indicated that a pro-bailout government was likely to emerge.

According to the analysis of exit poll, SYRIZA had a significant lead for the age groups 18–34 years and 35–54 years, while ND had a significant lead in regards of the age group above 55 years:

- Exit poll (18–34 years): SYRIZA=33%, ND=20%, PASOK=6%.
- Exit poll (35–54 years): SYRIZA=34%, ND=24%, PASOK=8%.
- Exit poll (> 55 years): SYRIZA=20%, ND=39%, PASOK=17%.

== Campaign ==
Even before the election had been called, Democratic Left (DIMAR) leader Kouvelis stated that DIMAR would likely not want to participate in a Coalition of the Radical Left (SYRIZA) led government even after repeated elections, as SYRIZA had declined to participate in a unity government with New Democracy (ND), PASOK, and DIMAR.

Before the election, it was expected that larger parties would try to form alliances with smaller parties; specifically, ND was in negotiations with Democratic Alliance (DISY), while DISY was also negotiating with Action (DRASI), and SYRIZA was trying to form an alliance with Social Agreement (KOISY). There were also rumours of SYRIZA negotiating with the Ecologist Greens (OP) and Anticapitalist Left Cooperation for the Overthrow -Front of anticapitalist, revolutionary, communist and radical Left Ecology (ANTARSYA). The other left parties however all ended to decide they would not merge or form a new coalition with SYRIZA. Another important change however happened for SYRIZA on 22 May, where the steering committee decided to transform the "Coalition of the Radical Left", from its 10 coalition parties into a single independent party with the new name "Syriza Unionist Social Front". The driving force behind the transformation from coalition to a united party, was the current Greek election law, stipulating that any coalitions participating in a parliamentary election should have their votes split up for each party in the coalition, before determining who became the largest party in the election and thus qualified to win the 50 extra bonus seats in the parliament. So the transformation by itself, greatly increased the chance of SYRIZA also to win bonus seats in the election.

ND and DISY announced a complete merger of the two parties into an overall united party on 21 May, and the following three parties announced on the same day an agreement to run the election as a new joint coalition: Recreate Greece – Action – Liberal Alliance (DX-DRASI-FS).

Social Agreement announced at 19 May their main goal was to establish a new "left government", and in order to achieve such a goal, they would abstain to participate in the election, and instead use all their energy to arrange meetings with all other progressive left parties, with the purpose of creating a convergence program for the parties to make formation of a new "left government" possible after the elections in June. On 28 May the Democratic Left (DIMAR) however repeated their previous stance, that it would only work with SYRIZA to form a "left government", on the condition that there were guarantees of staying within the eurozone, and this would according to DIMAR require SYRIZA to drop their idea of a unilateral cancellation of the "memorandum" (a nickname for: "The bailout deal that the previous Greek government agreed to implement with the Commission, ECB and IMF"). As none of the other left parties (OP, ANTARSYA and KKE), neither wanted to accept signing the proposed agreement of a unilateral rejection of the "memorandum" in favour of SYRIZAs new "National Recovery Plan", the attempt by Social Agreement to form a multilateral agreement between "all progressive left parties" ahead of the election failed. Instead only a small bilateral agreement between SYRIZA and Social Agreement was signed, outlining what the cornerstones of the new policy should be, if the election ended with a parliamentary majority for SYRIZA to form a one party government. On 7 June, the executive committee of Social Agreement decided they did not want to merge with SYRIZA, and reaffirmed they neither wanted to participate in any political coalitions, because they believed it was needed for them to stay as an independent neutral party, in order best to help creating a consensus among the left parties to form a new SYRIZA led government.

On 7 June, an arrest warrant was issued for Ilias Kasidiaris from Golden Dawn (XA), after he during a political debate broadcast by ANT-1 TV, as reported by the newspaper Kathimerini: "threw water at SYRIZA's Rena Dourou and then repeatedly slapped Communist Party hopeful Liana Kanelli", before the televised signal was interrupted.

The caretaker government and all parties, except for the leader of Golden Dawn, jointly condemned the TV show attack by Kasidiaris with the following statements: The spokesman from the caretaker government Dimitris Tsiodras said: "This attack is an attack against every democratic citizen. The least that any democratic citizen could expect is for Mr Kasidiaris's party, Golden Dawn, to condemn these actions unreservedly." ND, PASOK, SYRIZA and ANEL also jointly agreed, not to take part in any television or radio panel discussions with Golden Dawn candidates. An opinion poll published at 1 June by GPO, had indicated that 60% of the votes received by Golden Dawn in the May election, came from Greeks who wanted to express their opposition to the political establishment, while less than 30% of those voting for the party actually supported its extreme views on immigration. A spokesperson from PASOK said: "This young man proved today that he represents a neo-Nazi group, which apart from being far-right is also cowardly and thuggish" and called for those who previously voted for the party to "think again" before casting their June vote. ANEL leader Panos Kammenos launched the same message by saying "the neo-Nazis have been unmasked on TV. People who voted for the Nazi thugs should react when casting their vote next time." LAOS' Georgios Karatzaferis, said Golden Dawn was damaging the country's patriotic front: "It took us 10 years to gain respect and dignity for the patriotic movement. We won't let the party of Nikolaos Michaloliakos and the parliamentary gang of Mr Kasidiaris to ridicule what we have built all these years. It is time for them to leave political life. Fascism will not pass in Greece."

During the campaign, the 8 largest parties presented some political ultimatums about a possible government formation after the election:

Party name	Ultimatums to participate in a new government formation
DX-DRASI-FS	1) No ultimatum. Support those offering the most ambitious Memorandum revision (with reduction of public sector, and faster speed of economic + tax + pension reforms).
SYRIZA	1) Needs to be a SYRIZA led "left government". 2) Needs to do a unilateral cancellation of the EU/IMF memorandum (without any guarantees for a continued membership of the euro). 3) Needs to implement core elements of SYRIZA's newly formulated "National Recovery Plan" (with a.o. public expenditures increased from 36% to 46% of GDP).
XA	1) Needs to deport all illegal immigrants outside the borders of Greece. 2) Needs to do a written termination of the EU/IMF Memorandum.

=== EU influence ===
Few hours after the public announcement of the failed attempt by the Greek president to form a new government on 15 May, some Greek officials claimed that German Chancellor Angela Merkel had suggested to the Greek president during a telephone call, that he should consider to launch a "euro referendum" along with the new "legislative election". The Greek media and the heads of ND, PASOK, SYRIZA, KKE, and the interim prime minister, all went out strongly to criticise that Merkel purportedly had made such advice. One day later it became clear the entire debate had been based on a translated misunderstanding, as Merkel officially denied ever to have made such a proposition to the Greek president. Merkel insisted that she said the election was "in principle...an indirect referendum on euro membership", as the outcome of the election potentially could lead to a development with Greece leaving the euro, if the election was won by parties supporting a Greek rejection of all commitments signed in the Memorandum. British Prime Minister David Cameron, representing a neutral nation outside the euro, a few days later completely agreed with Merkel's analysis, that the Greek parliamentary election in principle was "an indirect referendum on euro membership".

An EU summit ended on 24 May with repeated calls for Greece to stick to the terms of the EU/IMF memorandum, if they wanted to receive more funds to tackle its debt problem and current economic crisis.

In the wake of the discussions, SYRIZA's leader Tsipras visited some of the main European cities, to clarify his stance of wishing to unilaterally cancel the Memorandum and at the same time having Greece stay within the eurozone. When the French Finance Minister Pierre Moscovici on 5 June repeated the European message that a continued euro membership was conditional on the next Greek government continuing to respect the signed commitments in the Memorandum, as the EU would only be willing to accept a re-negotiation of some subterms, Tsipras claimed this was political bluffing and a new message compared to what the French government previously had told him.

== Results ==
Results, showing the seats won by each party in each electoral district.

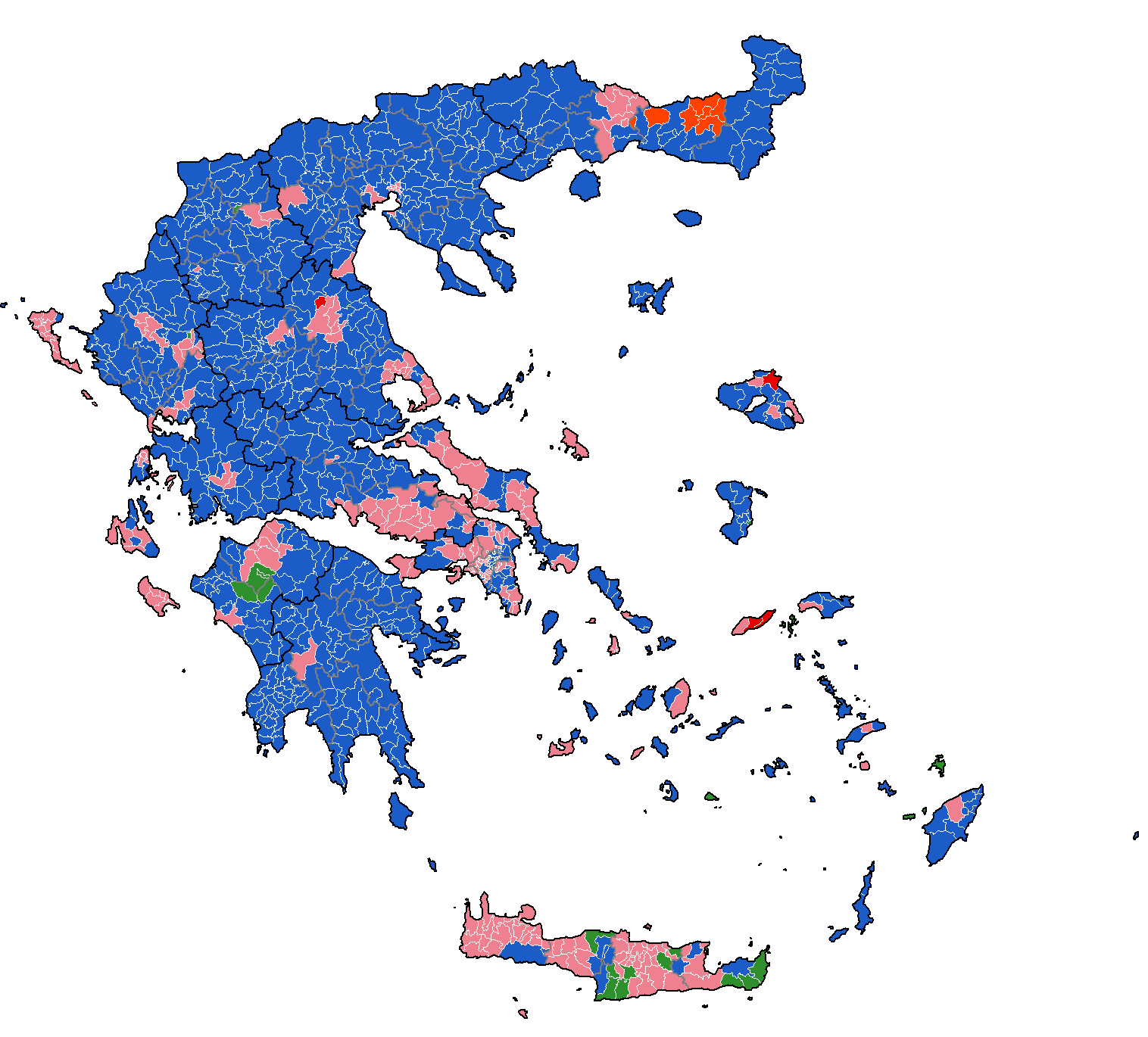
Results, showing the winning party in each municipal unit. ND (712) SYRIZA (280) PASOK (22) DIMAR (6) KKE (4)

Party	Votes	%	+/–	Seats	+/–
New Democracy	1,825,497	29.66	+10.81	129	+21
Syriza	1,655,022	26.89	+10.10	71	+19
PASOK	756,024	12.28	–0.90	33	–8
Independent Greeks	462,406	7.51	–3.11	20	–13
Golden Dawn	426,025	6.92	–0.05	18	–3
Democratic Left	384,986	6.25	+0.14	17	–2
Communist Party of Greece	277,227	4.50	–3.98	12	–14
Recreate Greece–Drassi–Liberal Alliance	98,140	1.59	–2.36	0	0
Popular Orthodox Rally	97,099	1.58	–1.31	0	0
Ecologist Greens	54,408	0.88	–2.05	0	0
I Don't Pay Movement	23,699	0.39	–0.49	0	0
Antarsya	20,416	0.33	–0.86	0	0
Society	17,770	0.29	–0.16	0	0
Union of Centrists	17,145	0.28	–0.33	0	0
Pirate Party of Greece	14,170	0.23	–0.28	0	0
Panathinaikos Movement	12,459	0.20	+0.20	0	0
Marxist–Leninist Communist Parties (KKE (m-l)–M-L KKE)	7,592	0.12	–0.13	0	0
National Hope	4,290	0.07	New	0	New
Liberal Party	623	0.01	–0.05	0	0
National Resistance Movement	81	0.00	±0.00	0	0
Panagrarian Labour Movement of Greece	0	0.00	±0.00	0	0
Independents	385	0.01	–0.05	0	0
Total	6,155,464	100.00	–	300	0
Valid votes	6,155,464	99.01			
Invalid/blank votes	61,334	0.99			
Total votes	6,216,798	100.00			
Registered voters/turnout	9,947,876	62.49			
Source: Ministry of Interior

Due to unforeseen circumstances, voting at the 18th polling station of the Athens A' Electoral District was aborted. In accordance with Article 102 of the electoral law, a new election will be held on 24 June and the 539 registered voters will be asked to cast their ballot again.

=== By region ===
Region	ND (%)	SYRIZA (%)	PASOK (%)	ANEL (%)	XA (%)	DIMAR (%)	KKE (%)
Achaea	25.66	32.17	13.49	6.73	5.93	6.37	4.36
Aetolia-Akarnania	32.65	25.26	14.90	5.30	7.59	4.94	4.92
Argolida	36.27	21.49	14.44	5.33	9.44	4.76	3.08
Arkadia	34.64	22.94	14.50	5.72	7.33	5.53	3.72
Arta	35.83	29.15	12.83	4.86	4.43	4.23	4.86
Athens A	30.92	26.96	8.72	6.31	7.81	7.37	4.74
Athens B	26.22	31.43	8.54	7.38	6.38	7.72	5.36
Attica	26.45	30.19	7.70	9.50	9.96	5.62	4.09
Boeotia	24.33	30.66	11.52	8.36	8.77	5.99	4.69
Cephalonia	27.66	30.74	10.15	5.87	7.59	4.46	8.77
Chalkidiki	34.90	22.48	14.64	8.77	6.20	5.34	2.71
Chania	20.43	33.77	13.77	8.37	5.48	6.93	3.76
Chios	34.18	18.43	19.02	5.77	5.05	7.81	4.02
Corfu	24.37	34.21	10.55	6.98	6.56	5.44	7.06
Corinthia	31.01	24.67	14.21	6.91	9.99	5.47	2.17
Cyclades	30.61	26.67	11.45	9.64	5.52	7.47	2.89
Dodecanese	32.38	22.88	16.68	9.55	5.97	4.73	2.64
Drama	35.81	17.43	16.77	10.05	5.84	5.12	2.23
Elis	30.45	26.21	16.55	6.04	7.61	5.13	3.50
Euboea	24.64	29.82	12.06	9.28	8.55	5.48	4.08
Evros	39.82	14.91	16.66	8.10	6.74	4.77	2.65
Evrytania	38.82	20.70	17.97	5.18	5.32	5.61	2.24
Florina	33.98	23.72	15.98	6.89	5.66	4.64	3.68
Grevena	35.39	18.52	19.34	4.58	5.34	5.61	6.04
Imathia	30.16	23.63	14.86	8.80	7.92	4.91	4.29
Ioannina	32.36	27.15	14.07	5.09	4.59	6.32	4.91
Heraklion	20.05	33.61	18.61	8.01	3.45	7.86	2.98
Karditsa	34.45	25.04	13.52	5.35	6.59	4.57	5.76
Kastoria	39.12	17.45	14.13	10.01	7.56	4.04	2.33
Kavala	34.59	21.15	14.86	8.35	6.65	5.15	3.49
Kilkis	36.14	19.02	14.27	7.11	7.79	4.67	5.38
Kozani	31.72	23.33	14.38	8.65	5.95	5.72	4.41
Laconia	40.99	17.47	14.60	4.81	10.87	3.74	3.54
Larissa	30.47	25.12	12.77	7.12	6.50	5.79	6.24
Lasithi	26.76	27.07	23.82	6.28	2.59	5.65	2.09
Lefkada	31.17	26.82	11.77	4.56	6.09	5.35	8.55
Lesvos	27.75	23.11	14.16	7.97	5.27	5.46	10.75
Magnesia	27.78	30.69	9.58	8.14	7.43	5.96	4.80
Messenia	41.59	21.55	11.65	4.11	7.76	4.44	4.13
Naxos	30.61	26.67	11.45	9.64	5.52	7.47	2.89
Pella	35.85	18.36	17.18	7.55	7.35	5.26	2.75
Phocis	33.60	23.05	12.47	7.66	7.05	5.35	4.96
Phthiotis	33.29	24.46	13.67	7.43	7.64	4.98	3.37
Pieria	35.85	18.58	14.99	8.73	6.98	5.73	3.49
Piraeus A	29.68	28.15	8.44	8.82	8.23	6.32	3.93
Piraeus B	18.63	36.31	7.94	9.35	9.28	5.73	6.57
Preveza	34.11	26.23	14.81	4.75	5.55	4.88	5.44
Rethymno	24.10	28.23	21.77	6.85	4.13	6.63	2.40
Rhodope	27.28	19.75	20.54	4.27	4.19	17.74	1.93
Samos	24.61	25.50	10.79	5.68	5.93	4.55	18.29
Serres	40.14	16.34	14.90	7.68	7.13	4.60	3.18
Thesprotia	34.32	23.32	17.50	5.36	5.27	5.58	3.43
Thessaloniki A	27.75	26.95	10.23	8.92	6.78	7.45	4.50
Thessaloniki B	31.91	23.40	11.12	9.16	7.75	6.12	4.10
Trikala	33.47	22.84	14.65	5.58	5.56	7.15	6.25
Xanthi	26.48	38.56	9.74	7.13	4.89	4.33	3.35
Zakynthos	28.34	34.74	11.73	4.09	5.54	4.21	7.56

== Reactions ==
Eurozone finance ministers were quick to issue a statement that read the result "should allow for the formation of a government that will carry the support of the electorate to bring Greece back on a path of sustainable growth...The Eurogroup reiterates its commitment to assist Greece in its adjustment effort in order to address the many challenges the economy is facing." It also said the "troika" of the European Commission, European Central Bank and International Monetary Fund would re-visit Athens to continue discussions on the bailout agreement. On his way to the 2012 G-20 Mexico summit, British prime minister David Cameron warned of delayed government formation and said that "the outcome of the Greek election looks clear in terms of a commitment to stay in the eurozone and to accept the terms of the memorandum. But I think those parties that want that to happen can't afford to delay and position themselves. If you are a Greek political party and want to stay in the eurozone and accept the consequences that follow you have got to get on with it and help form a government. A delay could be very dangerous." European Union president Herman Van Rompuy issued a statement that read: "We will continue to stand by Greece." He added that "we are confident that the new government will take ownership of the adjustment program to which the Greek authorities had committed earlier this year." European Commission President Jose Manuel Barroso reiterated a willingness to visit Greece when a new government is formed to keep the country on track to continue receiving the bailout money.

New Democracy's Antonis Samaras said that "there's no time to lose or leeway for small party games. The country must be governed." PASOK's Evangelos Venizelos said that "there's not even a day to lose" in the need to form a new government. Samaras also said the election was a mandate to stay within the eurozone. Golden Dawn's Nikolaos Michaloliakos said that he "would like to thank the hundreds of thousands of Greeks who did not change their vote, despite the effort of wretched propaganda by the paid stooges on TV. We will continue the fight for a Greece that belongs to Greeks." In Thessaloniki, Golden Dawn's supporters celebrated the result and set off flares and fireworks.

The following day, financial markets initially rose on the news of ND's plurality, but later came down as the possible implications became known. On 19 June, European and American financial markets rose on speculation of the imminence of a new government that would have at least a modicum of support for the bailout programme.

== Analysis ==
The Huffington Post read Golden Dawn's popularity as a "symptom of the alienation and hardship that their society is experiencing." The statement was echoed by Fox News. The BBC cited Greece's debt-to-GDP ratio and forecasts to ask if an exit from the eurozone was only delayed. Al Jazeera said the May election was a vote out of anger over the austerity measures, but that this was a vote out of fear after the in terms of a more defined future. It cited Samaras' question of staying within the eurozone or returning to the drachma. It also asked if a "Grexit" (Greek exit) from the eurozone was inevitable and cited this as Europe's "Lehman moment" in reference to the bankruptcy of Lehman Brothers. It further cited the Royal Bank of Scotland's assertion that there was a 90 percent chance of a Greek exit from the eurozone within 12–18 months, while Citigroup estimated a 50–75 percent chance of an exit. UBS suggested a write-off of 60 billion euros of Greece's debts, as opposed to between 225 billion and 800 billion euros if Greece were to leave the eurozone. Greece was already expected to be unable to pay pensions and civil servant salaries by mid-July should there be no more external funds coming into the country. Foreign Affairs suggested that the election determined whether Greece would exit the eurozone and decide the fate of the entire postwar European project.

== Government formation ==
New Democracy announced it was working towards building a "pro-euro" coalition. The next day Samaras was tasked with forming a new government within the stipulated three days. SYRIZA announced that it would not join a coalition government which would include a party that insists on going ahead with the austerity measures demanded by the "troika." However, PASOK's Evangelos Venizelos met with Samaras and then announced that "the most crucial thing for us right now is to achieve the greatest possible range of consensus, and this must happen by [19 June] at the latest;" he then went on to criticise Tsipras' refusal to join the government in saying that "you can't have some people choosing the easy position of being in opposition and lying in wait for the government to fail – or rather trying to create the conditions for the government, that is the country, to fail." On 19 June, ND suggested it was on the verge of forming a coalition government with PASOK and DIMAR, though the latter's Fotis Kouvelis said that he would only offer conditional support. The same morning Samaras met with Kouvelis to gauge support for a three-party coalition. Ta Nea exclaimed in an op-ed that "political leaders should be aware of the fact that this government is Greece's last chance to remain in the eurozone. The Greek people are ready to reward the parties that manage to ease austerity and punish those that raise voices of dissent." ND then claimed to have a preliminary agreement with PASOK in order to form a government of national salvation.

On 20 June, ND announced a coalition government with PASOK and DIMAR after resuming talks for a common policy programme. Greek media speculated on who would be in the cabinet, including suggestions that the Finance Ministry portfolio would be given to Vassilis Rapanos, the president of National Bank of Greece. PASOK and DIMAR were said to limit their participitation in a new government so as not to be responsible for its actions. They also opposed the inclusion of cabinet members who were previously in the government that approved the bailout programme. Kouvelis said that DIMAR's conditions for joining the coalition government would include an extension of the timetable to meet the target to cut Greece's budget deficit, as well as cutting the minimum wage and revoking the austerity measures that had "decimated society."
