= Georgios Karatzaferis =

Greek politician (born 1947)

- Γιώργος Καρατζαφέρης
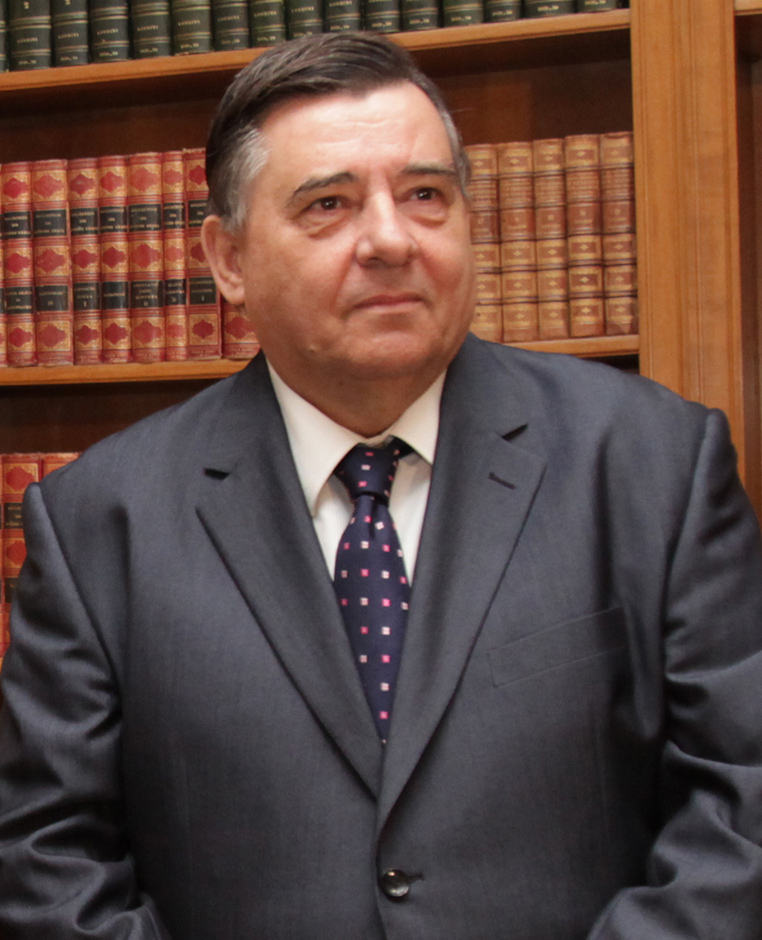
- Karatzaferis in 2011

President of Popular Orthodox Rally
- In office 14 September 2000 – 27 May 2019
- Preceded by: Office established
- Succeeded by: Nikolaos Salavrakos

Member of the European Parliament
- In office 13 June 2004 – 25 September 2007
- Constituency: Greece

Member of the Hellenic Parliament
- In office 16 September 2007 – 11 April 2012
- Constituency: Thessaloniki A

Personal details
- Born: 11 August 1947 (age 78) Athens, Greece
- Party: National Unity; Popular Orthodox Rally
- Profession: Politician; Journalist

Georgios Karatzaferis (Greek: Γεώργιος Καρατζαφέρης; born August 11, 1947) is a Greek politician, a former member of the Hellenic Parliament and the former president of the Popular Orthodox Rally. Previously, Karatzaferis was a member of parliament of the liberal-conservative New Democracy party. He is a former Member of the European Parliament and former vice-president of the Independence and Democracy group. The Popular Orthodox Rally's views, ideas, and electoral campaigns were often broadcast and promoted by the relatively minor private Greek TV channel TeleAsty (former Telecity) and the party's weekly newspaper, A1, both which he founded. In 2023, he praised Kyriakos Mitsotakis and endorsed New Democracy for the 2023 elections, campaigning for the party, without officially rejoining it.

== Biography and career ==
Karatzaferis was born in 1947. In 1977 he founded R.TV.P.R. AE advertising body and he created the TV Press Video Review in 1983. In 1990 he established the radio and television stations Radio City and TeleAsty (the latter was initially known as TeleCity).

He received an honours diploma from the London School of Journalism in 1994. He became an editor of the newspaper Alpha Ena in 2000. In the beginning of the 1980s he was also a columnist for Nea Poreia, the official publication of the political organization to which he belonged and was an MP. He also wrote contributed to daily newspapers including Eleftheros, Apogevmatini, and Eleftheros Typos. In 2005, he founded the Academy of Communications Studies in Athens.

As a member of the Greek Parliament his responsibilities included the chairmanship of the Parliamentary Watchdog Committee, the Public Order Committee and the Press and Mass Media Committee (1993–2000). He was a member of the Committees on Public Administration and Foreign Affairs (1993–2004), Member of the National Communications' Confidentiality Protection Committee and Vice-Chairman of the Greco Spanish Friendship Association (1999).

== Controversy ==
On different controversial remarks, Georgios Karatzaferis has publicly questioned why Jews did not "come to work on 9/11", suggesting that they were warned to leave the World Trade Center prior to the attack. He challenged the Israeli ambassador in Greece to come and debate on "the Holocaust, Auschwitz and the Dachau myth" and in 2001 he stated that "the Jews have no legitimacy to speak in Greece and provoke the political world. Their impudence is crass".

== Legal battles ==
In December 2015, he was sentenced to a suspended one year prison sentence with three years probation, a 10,000 euro fine and an 18-month period of political disenfranchisement, for filing an incomplete statement of assets and income during the years of 2010, 2011 and 2012, while he was in office.

== Books ==
Karatzaferis is also the author of five books:

- Το Μοντέλο της Δημοκρατίας - The Model of Democracy
- Η Γυναίκα Σήμερα - The Woman Today
- Η Λιάνη στηρίζει την Aλλαγή - Liani supports the Change
- Αγώνες και Αγωνίες της δεκαετίας 1990-2000 - Struggles and Agonies of the 1990–2000 decade
- Βίοι Αγίων - Biographies of Saints
- Η Λευκή Βίβλος - The White Bible

Political offices
Party political offices
New political party	President of Popular Orthodox Rally; 2000-present	Incumbent
