= Popular Orthodox Rally =

Popular Orthodox Rally Λαϊκός Ορθόδοξος Συναγερμός
- President: Philippos Kampouris
- Founder: Georgios Karatzaferis
- Founded: 14 September 2000
- Split from: New Democracy
- Headquarters: 52, Kallirois Avenue, 117 45 Athens
- Youth wing: Youth of the Orthodox Rally
- Ideology: Greek nationalism Right-wing populism Religious conservatism Euroscepticism
- Political position: Right-wing to far-right
- European affiliation: Movement for a Europe of Liberties and Democracy (2011-2015)
- European Parliament group: IND/DEM (2004-2009); EFD (2009-2014)
- Colours: Dark Blue
- Parliament: 0 / 300
- European Parliament: 0 / 21
- Regional councillors: 2 / 611

Website
- laos.com.gr

The Popular Orthodox Rally or People's Orthodox Alarm (Greek: Λαϊκός Ορθόδοξος Συναγερμός, Laikós Orthódoxos Synagermós), often abbreviated to LAOS (ΛΑ.Ο.Σ.) as a reference to the Greek word for people, is a Greek right-wing populist political party. It was founded by journalist Georgios Karatzaferis in 2000, a few months after he was expelled from the centre-right New Democracy. Today, the party is led by Philippos Kampouris.

In 2004, LAOS secured support from the Party of Hellenism and the Hellenic Women's Political Party. In 2005, LAOS absorbed the nationalist Hellenic Front. The youth branch of LAOS is the Youth of the Orthodox Rally (NEOS) (which is also a pun on the word for "youth" in Greek). The Popular Orthodox Rally was a member of the Europe of Freedom and Democracy (EFD) group in the European Parliament during the 7th European Parliament, and was a member of the Alliance of Independent Democrats in Europe, a European political party, until the AIDE's dissolution in 2008.

The party failed to reach the 3% threshold of the popular vote in the 2004 elections, with 2.2%; three months later it gained 4.12% of the vote and one seat in the 2004 European Parliamentary Elections. LAOS received 3.8% of the vote in the 2007 elections, electing 10 members of parliament. In 2009 LAOS managed to elect two representatives in the European Parliament, receiving 7.14% of the vote. After receiving 5.63% of the vote and electing 15 members of parliament in the 2009 elections, LAOS dropped below the 3% threshold in 2012 and failed to secure any seats in parliament. On 8 April 2016 LAOS joined the alliance National Unity. The party did not contest the 2019 elections or the May 2023 or June 2023 Greek legislative election.

High profile members, such as Makis Voridis, Thanos Plevris and Adonis Georgiadis, have since joined New Democracy, all three becoming ministers in the Cabinet of Kyriakos Mitsotakis, in what has been described as a "LAOSification" of the latter. Prior to the 2023 Greek legislative election, the party's founder and long-time president, Georgios Karatzaferis, praised Mitsotakis, calling him "the best politician of the century".

== Ideology ==
According to the Popular Orthodox Rally, "the demarcation of the political world into the Right wing and the Left wing is no longer relevant after the end of the Cold War. Nowadays, everyone in every aspect of his or her everyday life is either in favour or against Globalization". The party claims to consist of radically diverse groups that span the entire left-right political spectrum. Party president Karatzaferis, speaking on the 6th anniversary of the party's creation, stated "We are united in the only party that has in its ranks labourers and scientists, workers and the unemployed, leftists and rightists".

Karatzaferis has described the Popular Orthodox Rally as "a profoundly democratic party", consisting of everything from a "pre-dictatorship Right" to a merger of Left and Right to a "Popular Liberalism" in official party literature. He has also stated that he supports "patriotism and social solidarity, taking from all ideologies and personalities I like. I don't care if it's called communism, liberalism or socialism."

However, the Popular Orthodox Rally is often characterized by opposing politicians and in the media as "far-right", "populist", "radical right", "right-wing" and "nationalist". It has also been argued that its founding declaration (now withdrawn from the web) included antidemocratic, anti-parliamentary ideas, and the proposal that decisions should be taken by a council, which would include military officers and Church officials. The Popular Orthodox Rally began as a party with an Orthodox Christian religious identity, but also one with a radically nationalist political identity. Although it has since allegedly tried to 'moderate' the nationalist part of its appeal, with some of an extreme-nationalist or neo-fascist bent, such as Konstantinos Plevris, then leaving the party to join Patriotic Alliance or other fringe political organizations, more extreme-nationalists have recently once again joined its ranks and been elected to parliament. Of the ten Popular Orthodox Rally candidates who entered the parliament in 2007, four are considered to be part of the "nationalist bloc": Makis Voridis, "Thanos" Plevris, Adonis Georgiadis, and Kiriakos Velopoulos.

Amid the Greek government-debt crisis, the party supported the first bail-out in 2010 (the only parliamentary party apart from the governing PASOK), but thereafter voted against PASOK government on crucial votes, including the 29 June 2011 vote on austerity measures. After George Papandreou resigned in November 2011, LAOS participated along with PASOK and the ND in the government of national unity (the Papademos cabinet), but resigned from the government in February 2012 due to further austerity measures and amid declining popularity in polls. LAOS failed to win any seats in the 2012 Greece parliamentary election, which can be attributed to its previous indecisive position.

== Platform ==
The main points of the Popular Orthodox Rally platform are as follows:

- No accession of Turkey to the European Union
- Ban immigration from outside the European Union and deport all illegal immigrants.
- Opposition to the European Constitution and the Lisbon Treaty
- A strict stance in the Macedonia naming dispute; no recognition of the Republic of North Macedonia under any name that includes the term "Macedonia."
- Drastic tax cuts for both individuals and small businesses.

== Election results ==
=== Hellenic Parliament ===
Election	Hellenic Parliament					Rank	Government	Leader
Election	Votes	%	±pp	Seats won	+/−	Rank	Government	Leader
2004	162,151	2.2%	New	0 / 300	0	#5	No seats	Georgios Karatzaferis
2007	271,809	3.8%	+1.6	10 / 300	▲10	#5	Opposition	Georgios Karatzaferis
2009	386,205	5.6%	+1.8	15 / 300	▲5	#4	Government (Cabinet of Lucas Papademos, 2011–2012)	Georgios Karatzaferis
May 2012	182,925	2.9%	−2.7	0 / 300	▼15	#9	No seats	Georgios Karatzaferis
June 2012	97,099	1.6%	−1.3	0 / 300	0	#9	No seats	Georgios Karatzaferis
January 2015	63,669	1.0%	−0.6	0 / 300	0	#11	No seats	Georgios Karatzaferis
September 2015	Did not participate						No seats	Georgios Karatzaferis
2019	Did not participate						No seats	Nikolaos Salavrakos
May 2023	Did not participate						No seats	Nikolaos Salavrakos
June 2023	Did not participate						No seats	Nikolaos Salavrakos

=== European Parliament ===
European Parliament
Election	Votes	%	±pp	Seats won	+/−	Rank	Leader	EP Group
2004	252,429	4.12%	New	1 / 24	New	5th	Georgios Karatzaferis	IND/DEM
2009	366,616	7.15%	+3.03	2 / 22	▲1	4th	Georgios Karatzaferis	EFD
2014	154,029	2.69%	−4.46	0 / 21	▼2	8th	Georgios Karatzaferis	−
2019 (Note: Run in a joint list with PAT.RI.E.)	69,779	1.23%	−1.46	0 / 21	0	12th	Georgios Karatzaferis	−
2024	9,936	0.25%	−0.98	0 / 21	0	24th	Philippos Kampouris	−

=== Local elections ===
Results since 2004 (year links to election page)
Year	Type of Election	Votes	%	Mandates
2010	Local (peripheries)		4.0%	89

== Affiliated media ==
- The weekly newspaper A1
- ART television station
- The alpha1news.gr website.
- The ART radio station FM 102.7 collaborated with Nikos Koklonis

== See also ==
- List of political parties in Greece
