= List of frivolous political parties =

A frivolous party or a joke party is a political party which has been created for the purposes of entertainment or political satire. Such a party may or may not have a serious point behind its activities. This is a list of frivolous political parties.

Some more serious political parties, such as the Rent Is Too Damn High Party, may use the same tactics and humorous approaches to politics as their more frivolous counterparts but aim to address legitimate sociopolitical issues, something that some frivolous parties do not do. By contrast, fake political parties try to resemble serious and genuine political parties for nefarious purposes, such as voter suppression, embezzlement of state funding, division and dilution of voter interest groups, et al. Some fake parties may actually model themselves after frivolous parties in an analogous fashion.

== Australia ==
- Deadly Serious Party (deregistered in 1988)
- Imperial British Conservative Party (see also: Cecil G. Murgatroyd, defunct)
- Party! Party! Party! (1989 Australian Capital Territory election)
- Sun Ripened Warm Tomato Party (1989–1991, defunct)
- True Whig Party (disbanded 1970)
- Lower Excise Fuel and Beer Party (2001–2005, defunct)

== Austria ==
- The Beer Party
- Permanent Opposition to Democracy (Permanentní opozicí za demokracii, 1990 Czechoslovak parliamentary election)
- The Party of Moderate Progress Within the Bounds of the Law (PFGFIDSDG, Partei für Gemäßigten Fortschritt in den Schranken der Gesetze, Jaroslav Hašek, 1911–1921)

== Belarus ==
- Beer Lovers Party (defunct in 1998)

== Belgium ==
- NEE (NO, 2005–2007, defunct)

== Bangladesh ==
- Banana Party Bangladesh (BPB) (2024–present)

== Canada ==
- Canadian Extreme Wrestling Party (1999–2001, defunct)
- Lemon Party (Parti Citron, 1987–2004, defunct)
- None of the Above Direct Democracy Party (Note: Mostly a legitimate protest movement, the None of the Above Direct Democracy Party uses humor and satire as part of their platform and has fielded at least one perennial joke candidate, Above Znoneofthe.) (2014–present)
- Parti éléphant blanc de Montréal (White Elephant Party of Montreal, 1989–2009, defunct)
- Pauper Party of Ontario (2011–2022, defunct)
- Rhinoceros Party (1963–1993, 2006–present)
- The Canada Party (2012–2016, defunct)
- Absolutely Absurd Party (2003–2004, defunct)

== Czech Republic ==
- Friends of Beer Party (1990–1998, defunct)
- Helax – Ostrava is having fun (Helax – Ostrava se baví, defunct, 2002–2009, defunct)
- Yes, A Better Czech Republic with Aliens and Motorist Citizens (Note: The full party name is "YES, A BETTER CZECH REPUBLIC WITH ALIENS AND MOTORIST CITIZENS - (more affordable housing, free fares for schoolchildren and students, road repairs, rural development from subsidies, medical and dental emergencies in districts, enough kindergartens, enough free parking for Central Bohemians on the outskirts of Prague)". The aliens being referred to are not aliens in the legal sense, but rather actual extraterrestrials.) (Ano lepší Česko s mimozemšťany a občany motoristy, 2024–present)
- Yes, We Will Troll the Euro-Parliament (ANO, vytrollíme europarlament, 2019 European Parliament election)
- Balbin's Poetic Party (Balbínova poetická strana, 2002–present)
- Independent Erotic Initiative (Nezávislá erotická iniciativa, 1990–2025, defunct)
- Tabby Party (Mourek, 2022–present)
- Czech Anti-social Party (Česká strana asociálů, 2026–present)

== Denmark ==
- The baldy party (Skallepartiet, Jesu fødsel–present)
- The Puppet Party (Dukkepartiet, 2014–present)
- Union of Conscientiously Work-Shy Elements (defunct, 1979–1998)
- Vodka Party (Vodka Partiet, 2022–present)
- Election party with a Mexican theme (Valgfest med Mexicansk tema, 2017-2021)

== Estonia ==
- Royalist Party of Estonia (defunct)

== Faroe Islands ==
- Hin Stuttligi Flokkurin (The Funny Party, defunct)

== France ==
- Mouvement ondulatoire unifié (1965)

== Germany ==
- APPD (Anarchist Pogo Party of Germany, since 1981)
- Die PARTEI ('The Party' (Note: Backronym for Die Partei für Arbeit, Rechtsstaat, Tierschutz, Elitenförderung und basisdemokratische Initiative); Party for Labour, Rule of Law, Protection of Animals, Promotion of Elites and Grassroot-Democratic Initiative, since 2004) (represented in the European Parliament)
- Union nicht genug überdachten Lächelns trotz innerer Genialität (UngüLtiG) (Union of not enough reconsidered smile despite inner genius, 1980s in West Germany) (Note: The name „ungültig“ (invalid) refers to the practice of „ungültig Wählen“ (casting an invalid ballot), a call by extra-parliamentary groups in Germany to use defaced or blank votes as a deliberate protest against the political system or the established parties.)
- Kreuzberger Patriotische Demokraten/Realistisches Zentrum (KPD/RZ) (Patriotic Democrats of Kreuzberg/Realistic Centre, 1988–2016 in Berlin)
- Spaßpartei für Deutschland (Fun Party for Germany, 2002–2007)
- Deutsche Biertrinker Union (German Beer Drinkers Union, 1990 in East Germany)

== Greece ==
- Greek Ecologists (Έλληνες Οικολόγοι, 1986–2023, defunct)
- Smoking Groups for Art and Visual Composition (Κ.Ο.Τ.Ε.Σ., Καπνιστικές Ομάδες για την Τέχνη και την Εικαστική Συγκρότηση)
- Cynic Party of Greece-Diogenes (Κυνικό Κόμμα Ελλάδος-Διογένης, 2019–2023, defunct)
- Man's Friends (Φίλοι του Ανθρώπου, 2009, defunct)

== Hungary ==
- Hungarian Two-Tailed Dog Party

== Iceland ==
- Best Party (defunct)

== India ==
- Cockroach Janta Party (lit. 'Cockroach People's Party', कॉकरोच जनता पार्टी)
- Lal Hit Janta party.

== Iran ==
- Party of Donkeys (defunct)

== Ireland ==
- Don't Give a Feck Party (2014 Meath County Council election)

== Italy ==
- Love Party (Partito dell'Amore) (defunct)
- Italian Nettist Party (Partito Nettista Italiano) (defunct)
- Party of Creative Madness (Partito Della Follia Creativa) (2019–present, 2022 Italian general election)
- I Don't Vote (Io Non Voto) (2023–present)

== Japan ==
- No Party to Support (Shiji Seitō Nashi, 支持政党なし)
- Happiness Realization Party (Note: On multiple occasions, the Happiness Realization party has fielded the perennial joke candidate Yoshiro Nakamatsu. The party platform includes sensationalist and extremist views.) (Kōfuku Jitsugen Tō, 幸福実現党)
- The Collaborative Party (Note: Founded by Takashi Tachibana in 2013, initially as The Party to Protect the People from the NHK (NHK kara Kokumin o Mamoru Tō, NHKから国民を守る党), to oppose the license fees for the national broadcasting organization NHK stipulated by the 1950 Broadcasting Law. The party has changed its name repeatedly since then. Its candidates and officeholders possess a record of extensive controversy, and the party has used humor and satire enough to be labeled a frivolous party by its detractors. For example, Tachibana has claimed that NHK license fee collectors have yakuza connections, and Yoshikazu Higashitani, who was elected into the House of Councillors as part of the NHK Party in 2022, refused to enter Japan serve in his duty due to concerns of being a wanted fugitive. In 2023, two former members formed a new party with the previous name, which focuses on the core issue of scrambling NHK and ending TV license fees.) (Minna de Tsukuru Tō, みんなでつくる党; commonly referred to as NHK Tō, NHK党)
- Internet Breakthrough Party of Japan (Dennō Toppa Tō, 電脳突破党) (defunct)
- Pirate Party Japan (Note: Most pirate parties do not qualify as frivolous parties. However, due to strict laws regarding media piracy in Japan, Japanese pirate party initiatives have resorted to satire, entertainment, and pop culture references rather than direct advocacy for law reform.) (Nihon Kaizoku Tō, 日本海賊党) (defunct, 2006–2017)
- Okinawa Pirate Party (Okinawa Kaizoku Tō, 沖縄海賊党)
- Tokyo Tea Party (Note: Founded by Yuya Watase in 2010, the Tokyo Tea Party initially began as an anti-tax movement, then gradually retooled itself as a satirical parody of the American Tea Party movement following the 2009 nationwide income tax protests. The party lost its momentum after 2012, ceased operations after 2013, and may have existed in some form until the end of 2019.) (Tokyo Chakai, 東京茶会) (defunct, 2010–2013)
- Love and Peace Party (Note: Party of perennial joke candidate Teruki Gotō; other parties claimed by him have included "Teruki Goto and the Party that Changes the World", "A Sugar That Makes Shinshu Nagano Prefecture Chino City Healthy", "Opposition to Charging for Household Waste Party", et al.) (Love & Peace Tō, ラブ＆ピース党) (2022, 2024 local elections)
- Sports and Peace Party (Supōtsu Heiwa Tō, スポーツ平和党) (defunct, 1989–2006)
- Watch My Cute Political Broadcast (Kawaii Watashi no Seiken Hōsō o Mite ne, カワイイ私の政見放送を見てね) (2024 Tokyo gubernatorial election, affiliated with NHK Party)
- Our Group (Note: Party of perennial joke candidate Koichi Toyama. The candidate originally ran as an independent, beginning in 2007, establishing his unofficial party the same year. The party platform consists of an internally incongruous combination of extreme left, anarchist, nationalist, and fascist views.) (Wareware-dan, 我々団) (2007-present)

== Kosovo ==
- Strong Party (Partia e Fortë) (defunct)

== Lithuania ==
- Party of Bread Eaters (1993 presidential election)

== New Zealand ==
- Bill and Ben Party (defunct)
- Imperial British Conservative Party (defunct)
- McGillicuddy Serious Party (defunct)
- The Civilian Party (defunct)

== Netherlands ==
- Party of the Future or The Party Party (2002–2020, defunct)
- Provo (defunct)
- Rapaille Partij (defunct)

== Norway ==
- Beer Unity Party (defunct)
- The Political Party (defunct)

== Poland ==
- Polish Beer-Lovers' Party (defunct)
- Polish Party of the Bald (1993–1994, defunct)

== Romania ==
- Partidul Liber-Schimbist (defunct)

== Russia ==
- Against Everyone (Note: In equal part a legitimate protest movement and a frivolous party lacking any membership; between 1991 and 2006, Russian election ballots included a box titled "Against Everyone", which was removed in 2006 and the associated frivolous party (ru) was liquidated in 2020. The party continues to exist anonymously. Adherents are instructed to vote for everyone, filling in all boxes on election ballots "to avoid inflaming inter-party differences", i.e. defacing the ballots.) (1991–2020, outlawed, continues to function)
- Beer Lovers Party (Partiya lyubiteley piva, Партия любителей пива) (1993–1998, reformed in 2024)
- Existential Russia
- Morning Party
- Party of the Dead (Partiya myortvykh, Партия мёртвых) (2017–2022, outlawed, founder Maxim Evstropov declared a wanted fugitive as of December 2022)
- Russian Party of Love
- Subtropical Russia (Subtropicheskaya Rossiya, Субтропическая Россия) (founded in 1993 and co-led by Vladimir Pribylovsky)

== Serbia ==
- Sarmu probo nisi (lit. 'You Haven't Tasted the Sarma', Сарму пробо ниси)

== Slovenia ==
- None of the Above (Nič od tega) (registered in 2024)

== Spain ==
- Coordinadora Reusenca Independent
- Partido del Karma Democrático, PKD (lit. 'Party of the Democratic Karma')

== Sweden ==
- Donald Duck Party
- Evil Chicken Party (Ond Kyckling Partiet, 2021–present)
- Least Awful Party
- Chill Party

== Switzerland ==
- Anti-PowerPoint Party

== Taiwan ==
- Can't Stop This Party (defunct)
- Taiwan Mahjong Greatest Party

== Ukraine ==
- Darth Vader Bloc (2015–present) (see also: Darth Vader in Ukrainian politics)
- Internet Party of Ukraine (Internet Partiya Ukrayiny, Інтернет Партія України) (defunct, 2007–2020)
- Satirical-Democratic Party of Ukraine (defunct, 2013–2014)
- Ukrainian Anarchist Union (Note: Despite the serious history of anarchism, in recent years the Ukrainian Anarchist Union has organized fake and comedic protests where they promote the caricature version of anarcho-capitalism, accuse all government officials of corruption for reasons including that they accept salaries, demand the abolition of government and police, and simultaneously criticize the government for underfunding social programs.) (Soyuz Anarkhistiv Ukrayiny, Союз Анархістів України) (1999–present) (uk)
- Ukrainian Beer Lovers Party (Ukrayins'ka Partiya Shanuval'nykiv Pyva, Українська Партія Шанувальників Пива) (defunct, 1991–2001)
- Ukrainian Cossack Party (Kozatska Ukrayin'ska Partiya, Козацька Українська Партія) (2008–present)

== United Kingdom ==
- Adam Lyal's Witchery Tour Party (defunct)
- Church of the Militant Elvis Party, also known as the Bus Pass Elvis Party (defunct)
- The Eccentric Party of Great Britain (defunct)
- Fancy Dress Party (defunct)
- New Millennium Bean Party
- Official Monster Raving Loony Party
- Raving Loony Green Giant Party (defunct)
- Rock 'n' Roll Loony Party (defunct)
- The Blah! Party (Note: Merged into Official Monster Raving Loony Party in 2007; reclassified itself as a protest group in 2008.) (defunct)
- Teddy Bear Alliance (defunct)
- Rainbow Dream Ticket (Note: Party of perennial fringe candidate Rainbow George Weiss who claimed to have been psychically inspired to enter politics by an extraterrestrial named Sterling Silver. Originally founded as Rainbow Alliance, thereafter known as Rainbow Dream Ticket or Vote for Yourself Dream Ticket. Reached peak popularity during the 1997 UK general election, was renamed Make Politicians History in 2005, and was disbanded in 2009.) (1984–2009, defunct)
- Count Binface Party, created by comedian Jonathan David Harvey
- Gremloids (Note: Party of perennial joke candidate Lord Buckethead, played by Jonathan David Harvey. Also associated with the Official Monster Raving Loony Party. The character of Lord Buckethead was retired after 2019 due to a copyright dispute.) (1987, 1992, 2017 elections)
- Recyclons (Note: Party of perennial joke candidate Count Binface, played by Jonathan David Harvey.) (2021, 2024 elections)
- Give Me Back Elmo
- The House Party (Note: Party of childrens' TV show character and mascot Mr Blobby. The mascot has been written in as a candidate in numerous other elections.) (1995 Littleborough and Saddleworth by-election)
- No Candidate Deserves My Vote! (2000–2012, defunct)
- Dungeons, Death, & Taxes Party (2005 UK general election, defunct)
- Happening Happy Hippy Party (1997–2002, defunct)
- Nude and Proud (2021 Senedd election)
- Citizens for Undead Rights and Equality (2010–2012, defunct)
- Miss Great Britain Party (2008–2009, defunct)
- Al-Zebabist Nation of OOOG (2014–2017, defunct)
- Blancmange Throwers Party (Note: Represented by candidate Pamela Stephenson during its only electoral bid in 1987. The Blancmange Throwers Party existed until at least 1989; in the 1987 election, it was registered as the I Want to Drop a Blancmange Down Terry Wogan's Y-Fronts Party.) (1987 UK general election, Windsor and Maidenhead)
- The Mitre TW9 (2024 UK general election, Richmond Park)
- Creek Road Fresh Bread Party (1987 UK general election, Havant)
- The Gold Party (1987 UK general election, Finchley)
- The Space Navies Party (2006–2021, defunct)
- The Moon and Serpent Party (Note: Known by multiple other variations on its name; originally known as the Psychedelic Future Party.) (2018–present)
- Science Fiction Looney Party (1976 Cambridge by-election)

== United States ==
- Down With Lawyers Party
- Guns and Dope Party
- OWL Party
- Surprise Party
- Undecided Cow Party
- Birthday Party
- All-Night Party (Note: Fictional party featuring Marvel Comics character Howard the Duck as candidate.) (1976 presidential election)
- Rent Is Too Damn High Party
- Pail and Shovel Party (Note: University of Wisconsin student senate. https://news.wisc.edu/history-of-lady-liberty-on-lake-mendota/)

== Uruguay ==
- The Concordance Party (Spanish: La Concordancia) (led by Domingo Tortorelli; 1938, 1942, 1950 general elections)

== See also ==
- Lists of political parties
- List of fictional political parties
- List of practical joke topics
- Jedi census phenomenon
- Non-human electoral candidates
- Novelty candidate
