= Canada Party (disambiguation) =

Canada Party may refer to:

- Canada Party, federal Canadian political party established in 1993
- Canada Party (2015), Canadian political party established in 1993, led by former MP Jim Pankiw
- The Canada Party, Canadian satirical group
