= Sailor King =

Sailor King may refer to several European monarchs:

- William IV (1765–1837), King of the United Kingdom
  - Sailor King: The Life of King William IV by Tom Pocock
- George V (1865–1936), King of the United Kingdom
- George VI (1895–1952), King of the United Kingdom
- Frederik IX (1899–1972), King of Denmark
- Harald V (born 1937), King of Norway

== Other uses ==
- Sailor King, an American Thoroughbred and winner of the Spindrift Stakes (1898)
- Sailor King, a Japanese voice actor starring in Nerima Daikon Brothers
- Sailor King, a drifter that struck a mine and sank in the North Sea in November 1940
- Sailor King Moondog White, an independent candidate for the Canadian Extreme Wrestling Party
- HMT Sailor King, a requisitioned trawler of the Royal Navy for use in World War II

== See also ==
- List of monarchs by nickname
