= The Party of Moderate Progress Within the Bounds of the Law =

Satirical Czech political party

The Party of Moderate Progress Within the Bounds of the Law Strana mírného pokroku v mezích zákona
- Leader: Jaroslav Hašek
- Founded: 1911
- Headquarters: Prague
- Ideology: Satire; Joke party
- Political position: Centre-left

The Party of Moderate Progress Within the Bounds of the Law (PMPWBL, Czech: Strana mírného pokroku v mezích zákona (SMPVMZ); German: Partei für gemäßigten Fortschritt in den Schranken der Gesetze, PFGFIDSDG) was a satirical political party in Cisleithania (Austria-Hungary), founded by Jaroslav Hašek in 1911. The party campaigned satirically for election to the Imperial Council (Austria). Due to their dual nature as both a political "party" and a political-artistic "action group", it is often extremely difficult to differentiate the reality from the fiction of the SMPVMZ.

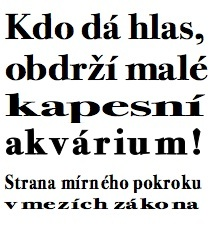
Party campaign slogan for Austrian 1911 parliament elections: "Every voter receives a small Pocket aquarium!"

== History ==
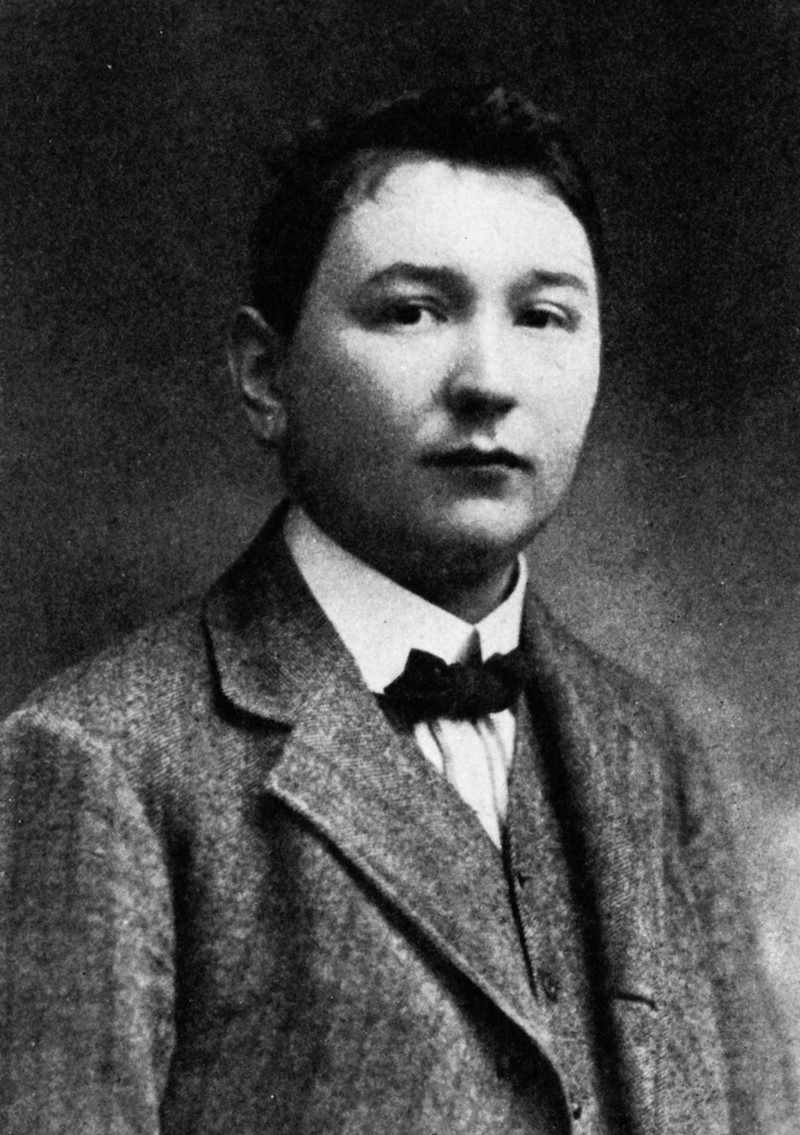
Party leader Jaroslav Hašek

=== Founding ===
According to the statements of the party leader Hašek, the party was founded in 1904 in the restaurant 'The Golden Liter' (Czech: Zlatý litr) in Prague's Vinohrady quarter. Other participants were the writer František Langer and the Prague Technikum official Eduard Drobílek, who came up with the idea and served as treasurer. The party name referred to the controversial Imperial Rescript dated September 12, 1871, in which the Bohemian Landtag, as the representative organ of Czech political power, was asked to contribute to "the contemporary constitutional order, in the spirit of moderation and reconciliation." The party was most likely founded as a direct response to the overly accommodating behavior of the Czech Social Democratic Party ("Evolution, not Revolution"), whose Prague representatives held events in Zlatý litr. The party slogan abbreviation was "SRK", which officially stood for "Solidarity, Rights and Comradeship" (German: Solidarität, Recht und Kameradschaft) but in practice meant Slivovitz, Rum and Kontusovka.

The party grew slowly. By its own account, there were only eight members as of December 14, 1904. As time went on, membership grew to include a few lawyers and doctors, as well as numerous figures from Prague's cultural scene including: anarchist journalist and publisher Antonín Bouček; satirist, painter, and anarchist František Gellner, who served two stints as party secretary; writers and satirists including Karel Toman, Josef Mach, Gustav Roger Opočenský, Louis Křikava, and Josef Skružný; anarchist poet Josef Rosenzweig-Moir; the journalists Karel Pelant and Karel V. Rypáček; illustrator Josef Lada; ballet dancer Franz Wagner; "Hero of the Macedonian Uprising", as well as self-proclaimed Voivode Jan Klimeš, and police commissioner Slabý, who served as "Enforcers" at party meetings. There is no evidence the party engaged in any public activities until 1911. The only record is a political pamphlet by Hašeks from 1904 referred to as "I am a member of a secondment from the country" that is possibly a description of the earliest form of the party's work. However, numerous researchers place the founding of the party with the activities of the 1911 elections. In contrast, numerous texts describe pre-1911 propaganda expeditions by party members to different regions of the K.u.K-Monarchy. The journeys were described by the party leader as figurative "apostolic missions" through Moravia, Lower Austria, Hungary, Croatia, the Carniola, Styria, Upper Austria, Bohemia and Vienna. Since these trips have a strong resemblance to the "Vagabond Wanderings" (Czech: Čundr) Hašek regularly undertook starting in 1900, perhaps the party history is a case of an after-the-fact blurring and mystification on the part of the author, as evidence shows Hašek active as a journalist for an anarchist newspaper and an anarcho-syndicalist organizer during this time. For example, in 1907 he disturbed an electoral event of the Clerical Party as an agent provocateur, and in the same year was sentenced to a month in prison on charges of "assassination" and "incitement to assault". Therefore, some researchers consider the PMPWBL an "anarchist front-group".

=== 1911 election ===
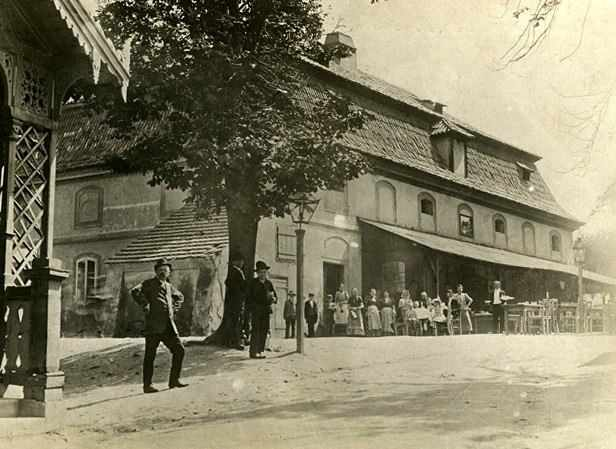
Party headquarters: the Kravín restaurant

On April 8, 1911, after the dissolution of the old imperial council, the Austrian Interior Minister set a general election date of June 13, 1911, for the election of deputies to the 21st session of the Austrian House of Deputies that was to begin in mid-July. A few days later at the new party headquarters, the Cow Stall (Czech: Kravin) in the Vinohrady quarter, an executive committee of the reorganized "Party for Moderate Progress Within the Bounds of the Law" announced they would participate in the election with their own candidate. At the same time, they published a manifesto to the Czech people, in which they introduced to party ideology of "Moderate Progress":

"The Svatopluk Čech Bridge was not built overnight. First Svatopluk Čech had to be born, become a famous poet, die, then there had to be an urban renewal, and only then was the Svatopluk Čech Bridge built."

The manifesto was even signed by leading Czech social democrats Emanuel Škatula and Bohumír Šmeral, later co-founders of the Communist Party of Czechoslovakia. However the two politicians stood in the election as candidates, and it is highly doubtful they were aware of their signatures in advance.

The platform of the candidate for the Vinohrady election district, Jaroslav Hašek, consisted of seven points:

1. The reintroduction of slavery.
2. The nationalization of janitors ("similar to how it is in Russia [...], where every janitor is simultaneously a police informer").
3. The rehabilitation of animals.
4. The institutionalization of feeble-minded MPs.
5. The reintroduction of the Inquisition.
6. Judicial immunity for priests and the Church ("In cases where a schoolgirl is deflowered by a priest").
7. The mandatory introduction of alcoholism.

The party hosted numerous speaker evenings, which included Max Brod and Franz Kafka among the spectators. Hašek gave multi-hour campaign speeches "with a great deal of promises and reforms, [he] smeared the other parties, denounced his opponents, everything that befits a decent candidate to such an honorable [position]", according to attendee František Langer. The songwriter Josef Mach wrote a party hymn especially for the campaign:

"Milión kandidátů vstalo, / by oklamán byl bodrý lid,
by voličstvo jim hlasy dalo / prý ochotně je chtějí vzít.
Ať prudký pokrok chtějí jiní, / násilím zvracet světa řád,
my pokrok mírný chceme nyní, / pan Hašek je náš kandidát!"

English Translation (from German):

"A million candidates marching on,/giving false council to clueless people.
They want to get your votes,/every voter will be accepted.
They want thunderous advances,/to violently change the way the world is run,
But we stand up for reasonable progress/with the candidate Mr. Hašek!"

Moreover, they campaigned for their candidate with pamphlets and placards: "Voters - what you hope to get from Vienna, you'll also get from me!" "Voters, use your ballot to protest against the earthquake in Mexico!" and "Each of our voters will receive a small pocket aquarium". Even on the day of the election, the leadership of the party tried to expand the size of the campaign team by hanging a notice: "Wanted: a respectable man to defame opposing candidates". All of this was in vain: after the around 3,000 votes cast in the Vinohrady district were totaled, only 38 were cast for the PMPWBL, or according to a contemporary periodical publication, as few as 16 votes. The newspaper Čas reported in its "Daily Chronicle", on July 15, 1911, "Nothing is known about the fate of this candidacy, and the Imperial press office has not made any official statement regarding it. The candidate intends to protest." The silence of the Imperial election commission was not unexpected, as the party had apparently not even officially registered its candidacy. As a result, the votes for Hašek were considered invalid. Later, on July 17, 1911, PMPWBL-member František Gellner wrote a positive review of the campaign in the magazine Karikatury:

"Assuming that the enthusiastic agitation by the supporters of the Party for Moderate Progress within the Bounds of the Law increases their vote tally in the next election by a factor of ten, and the Austrian Parliament is dissolved a few more times in the foreseeable future, then in a few years the candidate for the Party for Moderate Progress within the Bounds of the Law will be seated in parliament."

=== Further developments ===
The first party congress was held in 1913, in the restaurant Na Smetance in the Prague district of Žižkov, but was only attended by a few party members. When the party leader inadvertently sat down on the service cap of the supervising police commissioner, the event was dissolved. Hašek reports on a subsequent "long-term persecution of the party", a subsequent dramatic exaggeration.

After the outbreak of the First World War Hašek was called up in February 1915 as a soldier, and was captured by Russians in September 1915. In 1916 he joined the Czechoslovak Legion, but deserted to the Red Army in 1918, where he held various functions, mainly serving as political commissar in the Political Department of the 5th Siberian Army. In December 1920 Hašek returned to Prague under false papers.

During the year 1921 the second PMPWBL congress took place in Prague-Žižkov, in a large hall in the restaurant Yugoslavia, and was attended by about 300 people. The highlight of the congress was the unanimous adoption of a foreign policy resolution calling for the demolition of the globe due to the hopeless world situation.

Although it had been declared that a third, secret party congress would be announced by newspaper advertisements in the section "Where to Today?," the activities of the PMPWBL ended in 1921. This was due to poor health of the party founder and chairman Jaroslav Hašek, who retired to Lipnice nad Sázavou in August 1921, where he worked until his death in January 1923 on his novel The Good Soldier Švejk.

== Reality and literary treatment ==
The actual existence of the Party of Moderate Progress Within the Bounds of the Law is beyond dispute. Apart from the literary treatment by Jaroslav Hašek, there are numerous contemporary newspaper and magazine articles describing the activity of the party. Furthermore, it comes up repeatedly in the memoirs of participants and contemporary witnesses as well as in scientific works. According to Kindler's Neuem Literaturlexikon, Hašek's published speeches appear to have actually been delivered "in the same or similar form". On the other hand, there is no realistic basis for the allegation that Hašek attended over 1,000 election campaign events during the campaign.

In 1911-12, Jaroslav Hašek wrote almost 30 texts about the PMPWBL and its members. These are partly literary accounts, partly fictitious satire. The manuscript was bought in 1912 by the Prague publisher Karel Ločák, but not published because he feared problems due to the personality rights of the described persons. The next owner of the manuscript, Alois Hatina, only published ten of the texts in the magazine "Směr" after Hašek's death in 1924/25. Nevertheless, the party was remembered. In 1928, when the Communist Party of Czechoslovakia wanted to distract from its failures with intensified populist propaganda campaigns, the Social Democratic newspaper Právo Lidu asked ironically: "Are the Communists the Party of Moderate Progress Within the Bounds of the Law?"

In 1937, the newspaper Rudé právo published 23 of Hašek's works. They appeared in their entirety in book form for the first time in 1963 in Czech, and in 1971 in German translation. In the appendix to this edition ("Quellen und Materialien") there are two further texts obviously written by Hašek for the election campaign of 1911, as well as one of Hašek's election speeches as recorded by František Langer and Josef Mach. Separately, in the early 1920s Hašek also wrote Minutes of the Second Party Convention, first published in German in 1957.

== Legal status of the party ==
From today's perspective, the freedom Hašek and his colleagues exercised for their party activities seems amazing, given the Habsburg Monarchy's contempt for the party system and the monarchy's lack of a constitutional role for political parties. In legal practice at the time, the concept of "party" was used either in the sense of a political "club", an "association" or in the sense of "electoral list" as outlined in contemporaneous electoral regulations. A party law was not issued in Austria until 1975. Prior to this date, a party could be founded either by a simple statement of the participants (see. the later foundations of the ÖVP, SPÖ and KPÖ, known as "Declarations of Independence"), or by a "founding agreement" according to the rules of the Association Act.

Starting in 1867, founding legally recognized associations no longer required the approval of the supervisory authority, and these were instead only subjected to a four-week "prohibition period" (§ 6), which the PMPWBL effortlessly survived due to its "pro-state" demeanor. However, due to the presumed danger of parties in the Association Act, association activities were regulated in great detail. These regulations included the obligation to report all association activities to the government, and the right of the government to send officers to supervise the association. The election events of the PMPWBL were also subject to police supervision. While the supervising officer was allowed to dissolve meetings, he was explicitly forbidden to interfere in the debate or talk to anyone other than the club chairman, which severely curtailed his practical threat to PMPWBL public gatherings:

"Below an impromptu podium, the founders of this party, the Central Committee, sat at a long table with weighty faces. On the podium, at a small table with even more serious faces, the young chairman and a police commissioner were enthroned. Beside him stood Hašek, delivering his 'election speech. [...] The hall roared with laughter. And the police commissioner, who had absolutely no idea what was going on here, looked around lost and did not know whether he should intervene here."

== Scholarly assessment ==
There is wide academic agreement on the motivation for the founding of the PMPWBL. The author and publisher Günther Jarosch argues social critique and ridiculing the contemporary opportunist party system through "hyper-loyalty" were the driving force behind the founding of the PMPWBL. These forces were also the basis for the Prague Czech cultural elite's acceptance of the party's provocative activities, which can be understood only in the context of the decades-long smoldering problem of nationalities in Bohemia. The political scientist Ekkehart Krippendorff emphasizes that in a "mixture of jests, and ultimate seriousness [...] the confusion and the morally pretentious rhetoric of party politics of the time was pointedly" brought into sharp relief. Only the Hašek researcher Gustav Janouch considers the party a kind of drunken joke, which was only supposed to increase the beverage turnover in the Kravín inn. This is contradicted by Jaroslav Hašek son Richard, "My father took his candidacy in the elections of 1911 very seriously and was operated from the assumption that he would get the number of necessary votes. After the election defeat, he was very disappointed and depressed."

According to Slavist Gisela Riff, the actions of Hašek and his party comrades reveal a merciless play on the "concepts" and "values" of political life. The philologist Walter Schamschula describes Hašek's goal as disillusioning spectators by breaking bourgeois taboos - not only in relation to Austro-Hungarian parliamentarism and its leading figures, but also in relation to individuals themselves. Therefore Hašek did not limit himself to criticism of himself and his party, but also anecdotally described accounts of their own willingness to lie deceive and deny their own political beliefs for personal gain.

Gisela Riff also emphasizes the "impeccable" character of Hašek's performances. Hašek's main means of doing so was freely improvised speech, where he used long chains of association to combine the important with the trivial, fact with fiction. Hašek said in a campaign speech:

"Regulatory laws and security officials keep watch over us, and not so much as a single hair falls from our heads without their supervision. That's progress. If we look elsewhere, to China, for instance, where the security organs cut off people's heads, then must ourselves admit that here there is progress."

As events went on, however, the lines of argument would become more and more absurd:

"Friends, we are at a point where we did not want to be. Like the man who wanted to Budweis and got on a train in the opposite direction. He was caught by the conductor in second class, although he only had a third-class ticket and was thrown off the train in Bakov. And as one of the pioneers of our party, Mr Galileo Galilei, once said, 'And yet it moves,' I say now: Move, Miss Bożenka, and please bring a new round: three more beers for me, an allasch for Opočenský, a quarter of white wine for Langer, a beer and a Magador for Diviš and a mineral water for Gottwald. This is proof of Galileo's words, 'And yet it moves' and clear evidence that the Party for Moderate Progress Within the Bounds of the Law, knows how to assert itself and care about what its constituents want."

Riff and her pupil the linguist and translator Jana Halamíčková drew parallels to artistic forms and mediums such as happenings, Dada events, audience participation, and the play Offending the Audience. Thus, the PMPWBL is one of the precursors of forms of political action that, since the 1968 movement and the formation of a new alternative culture, have questioned the established political institutions, forces and media. This type of political practice led to new practices of political expression emanating from average citizens. For example, see Sponti groups, revolutionary spontaneity or guerrilla communication strategies.

== Consequences ==
After the collapse of communism in November 1989, the party, which according to self-mystification continued to exist illegally since 1921, returned to the public under the leadership of the cartoonists Josef Kobra Kučera and Vít Hrabánek and hosted the long-ago announced third Party Congress. Furthermore, from 1990 to 1992 the party published Skrt, a satirical magazine with an official circulation of 300,000.

In the following years, the party faced contemporary political problems: In 2000, it called for "moderate globalization within the bounds of the law" and suggested sending as many of its own children abroad as possible - and to have them demonstrate against globalization there. In January 2006, Richard Hašek, grandson of Jaroslav Hašeks and a leading member of the party, concluded a "non-aggression pact" for the upcoming parliamentary elections with KDU-ČSL, the Christian Democratic Party of the Czech Republic. The contract, in which reciprocal attacks with beer and slivovitz continued to be expressly allowed, was signed by the then chairman of the KDU-ČSL Miroslav Kalousek in the presence of his deputy Jan Kasal, vice-president of the Czech House of Representatives.

In 2003 a sister party was founded in Austria under the name of the Party of Reasonable Progress Within Moderate Limits. Since no activities of this party are detectable, it is assumed to be a mystification.

== See also ==
- Novelty candidate
- List of frivolous political parties
- Rhinoceros Party, a humorous and satirical party in Canada
- Official Monster Raving Loony Party, a similar party in the UK
- Party for Labour, Rule of Law, Animal Protection, Promotion of Elites and Grassroots Democratic Initiative (German: Die Partei für Arbeit, Rechtsstaat, Tierschutz, Elitenförderung und basisdemokratische Initiative (Die PARTEI)
- the Two-tailed Dog Party in Hungary

== Books ==
- Jan Berwid-Buquoy: Die Abenteuer des gar nicht so braven Humoristen Jaroslav Hašek. Legenden und Wirklichkeit. Berlin: Bi-Hi Verlag 1989, ISBN 3-924933-02-2
- Jaroslav Hašek: Die Partei des maßvollen Fortschritts in den Grenzen der Gesetze. Frankfurt a. M.: Suhrkamp 1971 (2. Aufl. 1990); Neuübersetzung als Geschichte der Partei des gemäßigten Fortschritts im Rahmen der Gesetze. Berlin: Parthas Verlag 2005, ISBN 3-86601-310-8
- Jaroslav Hašek: Protokoll des II. Parteitages der Partei für gemäßigten Fortschritt in den Schranken des Gesetzes. In: Ders.: Schule des Humors. Frankfurt a. M.: Büchergilde Gutenberg 1957, S. 231–237.
- Radko Pytlik: Jaroslav Hašek in Briefen, Bildern und Erinnerungen. Berlin (Ost)/Weimar: Aufbau-Verlag 1983.
