= Party of Bread Eaters =

The Party of Bread Eaters (Lithuanian: Duonos valgytojų partija), also known as the Upcoming Lithuanian Branch of the World Eater Movement (Lithuanian: Pasaulinio valgytojų judėjimo būsimasis Lietuvos skyrius) was an unregistered frivolous political party in Lithuania which existed in 1993. It was established by Remigijus Vilkaitis, who stood in the 1993 Lithuanian presidential election before withdrawing and endorsing Stasys Lozoraitis Jr.

== History ==
Vilkaitis announced his intention to run in the 1993 presidential election on 12 January 1993, the last day before the registration deadline. He claimed that he was a member of the "upcoming Lithuanian branch of the World Eater Movement" since birth, and that it is an unregistered, but active organization which "seeks recognition by the United Nations".

The campaign and the party were endorsed and supported by the satirical newspaper Pirmadienis. His campaign team included satirical writer and poet Juozas Erlickas, chief editor of Pirmadienis Linas Virginijus Medelis and actor Vladimiras Jefremovas. The "Rumors" section of Pirmadienis claimed that Vilkaitis was endorsed by Ronald Reagan, Madonna and coal miners in Donetsk, and that 50 women in Vilnius had chosen to name their newborns "Remigijus Vilkaitis".

On 20 January 1993, Vilkaitis withdrew from the election. The party ceased to exist. It has since been mocked as an example of frivolous parties which existed early in Lithuanian politics after the collapse of the Soviet Union.

== Program ==
Vilkaitis and the Bread Eaters Party had a satirical political program. It described its political positions as "radical bottom". It proposed unification with an island nation in the Caribbean Sea to turn Lithuania into the world's longest country and bring prosperity by exporting straw hats to the tropical regions. Vilkaitis claimed that his first internal policy moves would be to purchase a place in Žvėrynas and a new car.

One of the campaign's focuses was the lack of hot tap water in the country, with the slogan "Vilkaitis fulfills his promise - there will be hot water! Turn on the tap - maybe it's already flowing." (Lithuanian: R. Vilkaitis vykdo pažadą. Karšto vandens bus! Atsisukite čiaupus - gal jau bėga.)
