= Italian Nettist Party =

Italian Nettist Party Partito Nettista Italiano
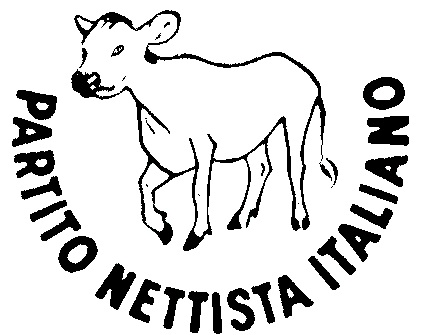
- Leader: Corrado Tedeschi
- Founded: 1953
- Dissolved: 1953
- Headquarters: Florence
- Ideology: Joke party
- Political position: Centre

The Italian Nettist Party (Partito Nettista Italiano, PNI), better known as the Steak Party (Partito della Bistecca), was a joke political party founded in Italy in 1953 by publisher Corrado Tedeschi. Considered a forerunner of anti-politics or the first Italian satirical party, the Steak Party took part in the 1953 Italian general election, promising to give people a steak every day.

== History ==
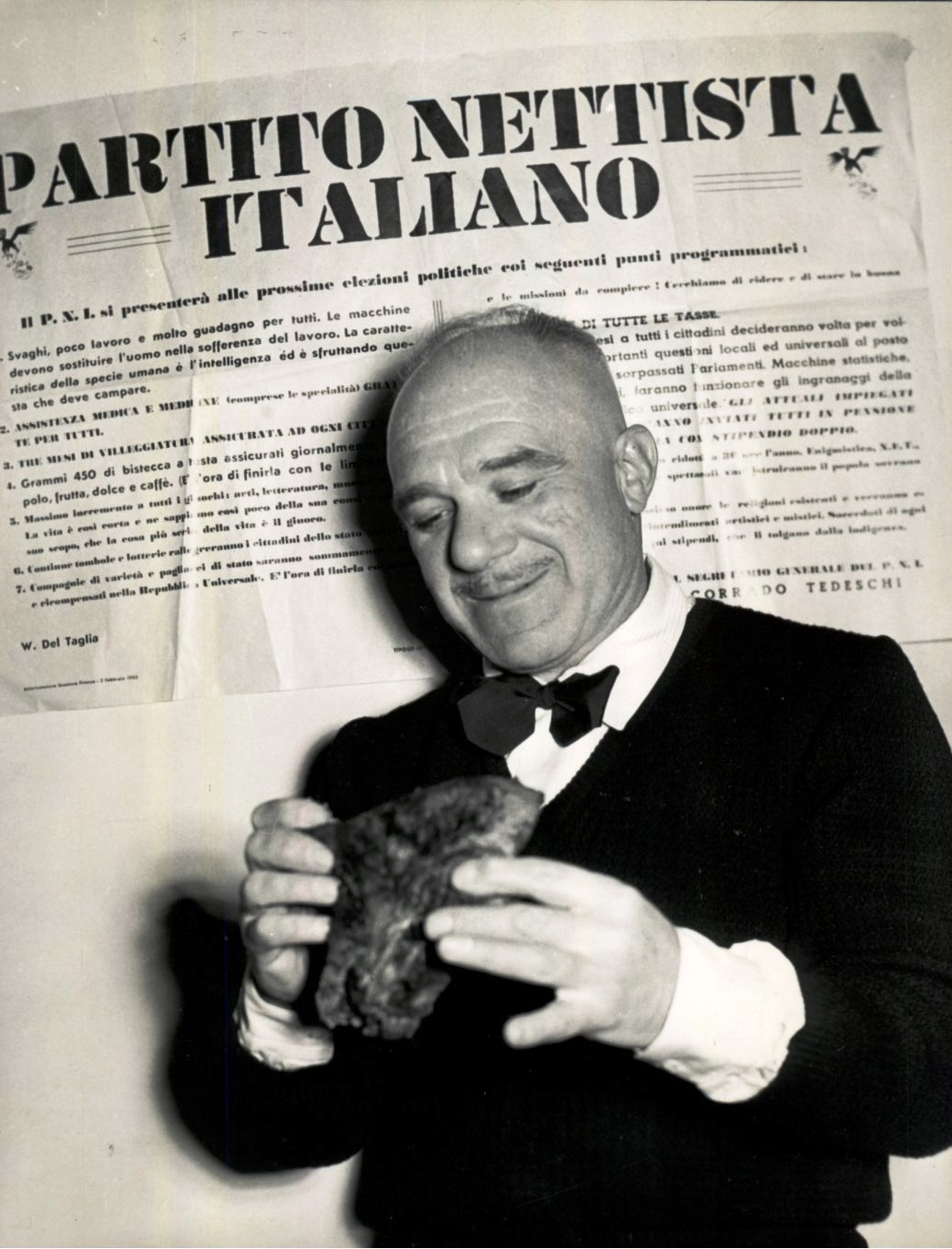
Corrado Tedeschi with a steak

In 1950s Florence, publisher Corrado Tedeschi, together with Ugo Cavallini, founded a political party named after their popular weekly puzzle magazine Nuova Enigmistica Tascabile (NET). The party was nicknamed the Steak Party (partito della bistecca) with its symbol being a heifer because the political program, among other things, would deliver a daily supply of steak to every citizen. The party also had an official anthem made up of cows' moos.

It's time to end the restrictions.

To be truly such, a beefsteak must weigh at least 450 grams. If it weighs a kilo, so much the better. But no less than a 450 grams, because otherwise it becomes a cutlet and then my party would no longer be the Beefsteak Party.

— Corrado Tedeschi, Italian Nettist Party platform

The party had a more than evident mocking, goliardic, surrealist intent, and just as evidently parodied the populist Common Man's Front.

Despite being a joke political party, the Italian Nettist Party took part in the 7 June 1953 general elections for the Chamber of Deputies, contesting the constituencies of Rome, Florence, and Milan. Their mottos were "Long Live Fun!" (W la pacchia!), and "Better a steak today than an empire tomorrow".

The Steak Party collected 4,305 valid votes, equivalent to 0.02% at the national level (or 0.14% in just Florence).

== Political program ==
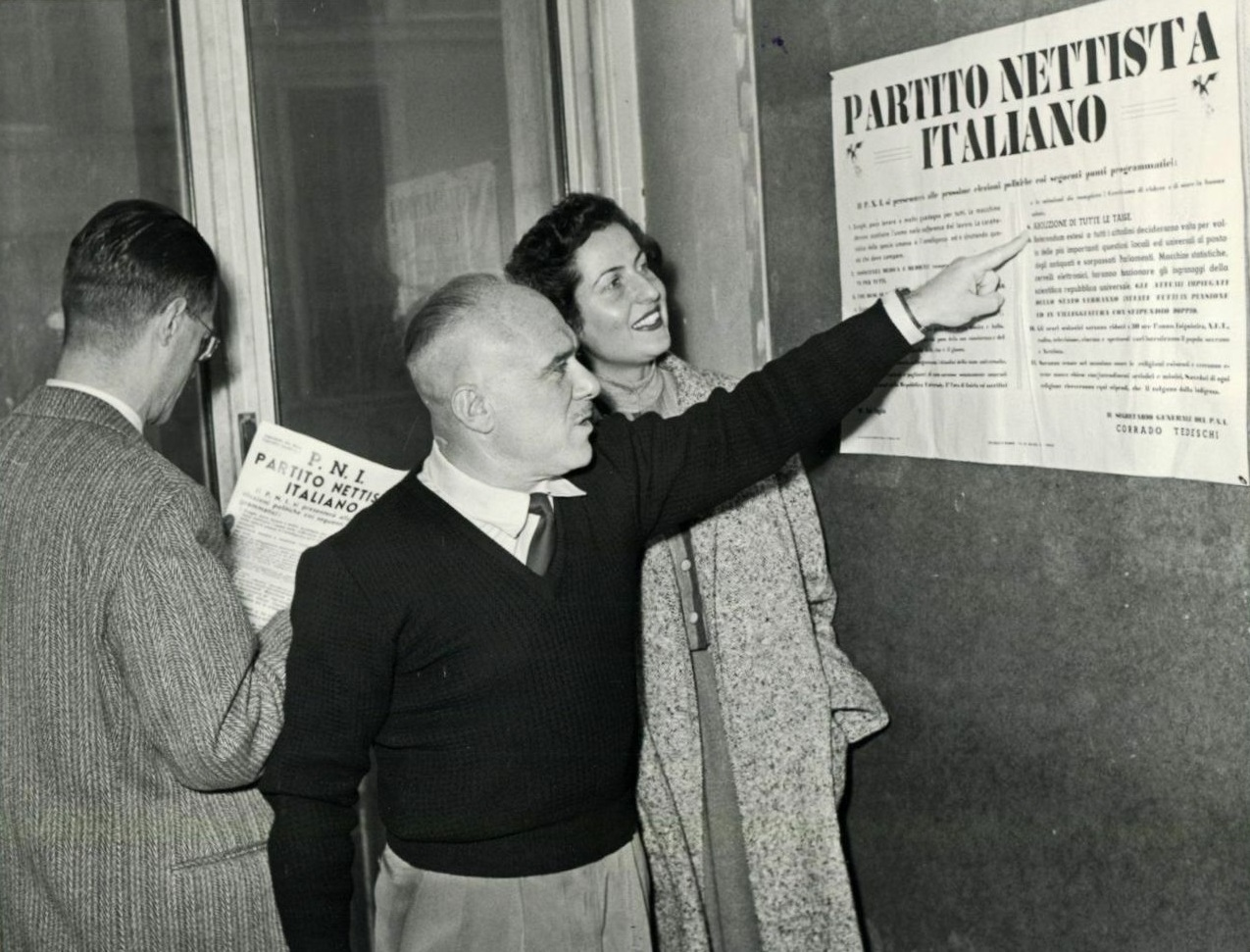
Corrado Tedeschi pointing to the Steak Party program

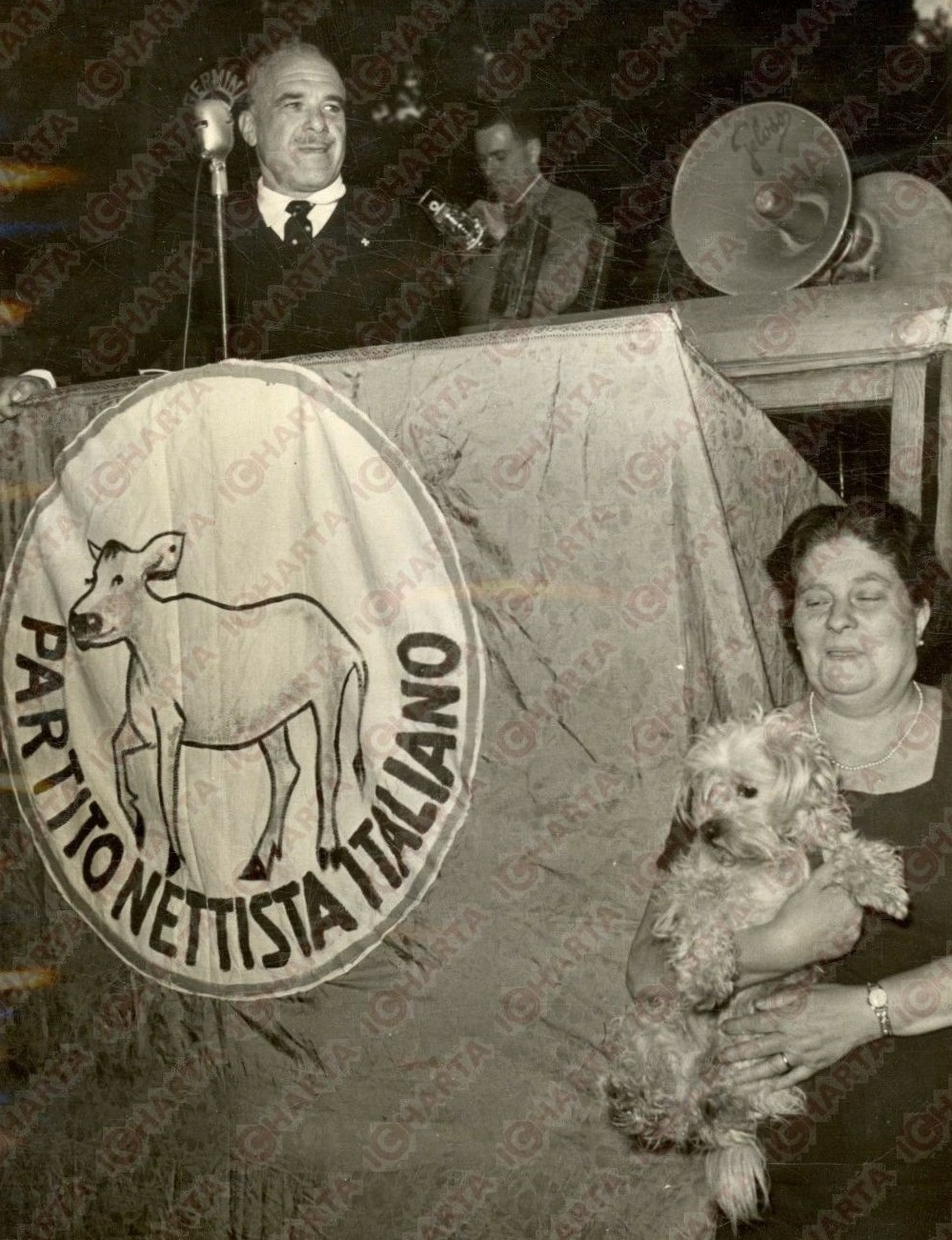
Tedeschi during a rally at Pincian Hill in Rome

Corrado Tedeschi presented the Nettist Party official program for 1953 Italian general election as follows:

1. Leisure activities, little work, and a lot of money for everyone. Machines must replace man in the suffering of work. The characteristic of the human species is intelligence and it is by exploiting it that it must survive.
2. Free medical care and medicine for all.
3. Three months of vacation for every citizen.
4. 450 grams (0.99 lb) of steak per person insured daily to the people, dessert, fruit and coffee.
5. Maximum increase in all games: arts, literature, music, and dance. Life is so short and we know so little about its consistency and purpose that the most serious thing about life is the game.
6. Continuous raffles and lotteries will entertain the citizens of the universal state.
7. State Companions of variety and clowns will be supremely honored and rewarded in the Universal Republic. It is time to end the sacrifices and missions! Let us laugh and be in good health.
8. Abolition of all taxes.
9. Referendums extended to all citizens will decide each time the most important local and universal issues instead of the outdated Parliaments. Statistical machines, electronic brains, will make the gears of the scientific universal republic turn. The current employees of the State will be sent in retirement and vacation with double salary.
10. School lessons will be reduced to 30 hours per year. Enigmatic NET, radio, television, cinema, and various shows will educate the sovereign and Nettist people.
11. Existing religions will be held in the highest honour and new churches with artistic and mystical intentions will be erected. Priests of all religions will receive fair salaries that will remove them from poverty.
12. Abolition of prisons. When all have 450 grams (0.99 lb) of insured meat, nobody will need to steal and kill. If there are any exceptions, we will treat them in asylums. We must lift humanity out of fear of war and imprisonment.

== See also ==
- 1953 Italian general election
- List of frivolous political parties
- Bistecca alla fiorentina
