= Smoking Groups for Art and Visual Composition =

Greek satirical political party

Smoking Groups for Art and Visual Composition Καπνιστικές Ομάδες για την Τέχνη και την Εικαστική Συγκρότηση
- Abbreviation: Greek: Κ.Ο.Τ.Ε.Σ.
- President: Nikos Louvros
- Founded: 2009
- Headquarters: Kolokotroni 57, Monastiraki
- Ideology: Legalization of smoking Political satire
- Colors: Green

Website
- kotes-kotes.blogspot.com

Smoking Groups for Art and Visual Composition, (Note: Greek: Καπνιστικές Ομάδες για την Τέχνη και την Εικαστική Συγκρότηση, Κ.Ο.Τ.Ε.Σ.) best known by the syllabic abbreviation K.O.T.E.S., (Note: Greek: Κ.Ο.Τ.Ε.Σ; a pun on the Greek noun Κότες, meaning "chickens") is a satirical Greek political party, founded in 2009. Its president is entrepreneur Nikos Louvros. The party's scope is to defends the rights of smokers.

== History ==
On 14 July 2009, it submitted a request to the Council of State to cancel the Avramopoulos Act, which prohibited smoking in public spaces, an action that gave it publicity.

The part made its first appearance in the 2009 Greek parliamentary election, running only in the parliamentary constituency of Athens A. The Greek press was surprised by the promotion of the part from a BBC show, in which a special mention to the party was made, as the first one globally to support the right of smokers. In the elections, is received 1,353 votes, managing to keep itself on the focus of media post-election.

A year after the elections, Nikos Louvros was called as the party's spokesperson in a radio poll regarding the smoking ban.

In the 2019 parliamentary election, Nikos Louvros participated as a candidate under Syriza.

In the May 2023 parliamentary election, the party participated on its own, gathering 11,522 votes, whereas in the June elections, party leader Louvros stated that he supported KKE.

== Other characteristics ==
The posters and emblems of the party made great use of the party's acronym (Greek: Κ.Ο.Τ.Ε.Σ. transl. CHICKENS). The party's emblem was an image with three chickens and in its showcase, it used a chicken-related pun ("και στις βουλευτικές εκλογές ΚΟΤΕΣ τσιμπητό" lit. transl. "and in the parliamentary elections [vote] CHICKENS bitten", a pun with the Greek words "τσιμπητό" and "δαγκωτό", with the later also meaning "to vote with complete confidence"). The party emblem with the chickens was used several times, in articles talking just about the party in articles that mentioned other, smaller parties, even after the elections. The pun ("τσιμπητό") became popular. The party was described by multiple outlets as expressing originality, humor, rich fantasy, with one outlet adding that it gave a "different color to the seriousness of the political system" (transl.).
