= 2009 Greek parliamentary election =

- 4 October 2009

All 300 seats in the Hellenic Parliament 151 seats needed for a majority
- Opinion polls
- Registered: 9,929,065
- Turnout: 70.95% (▼3.20pp)
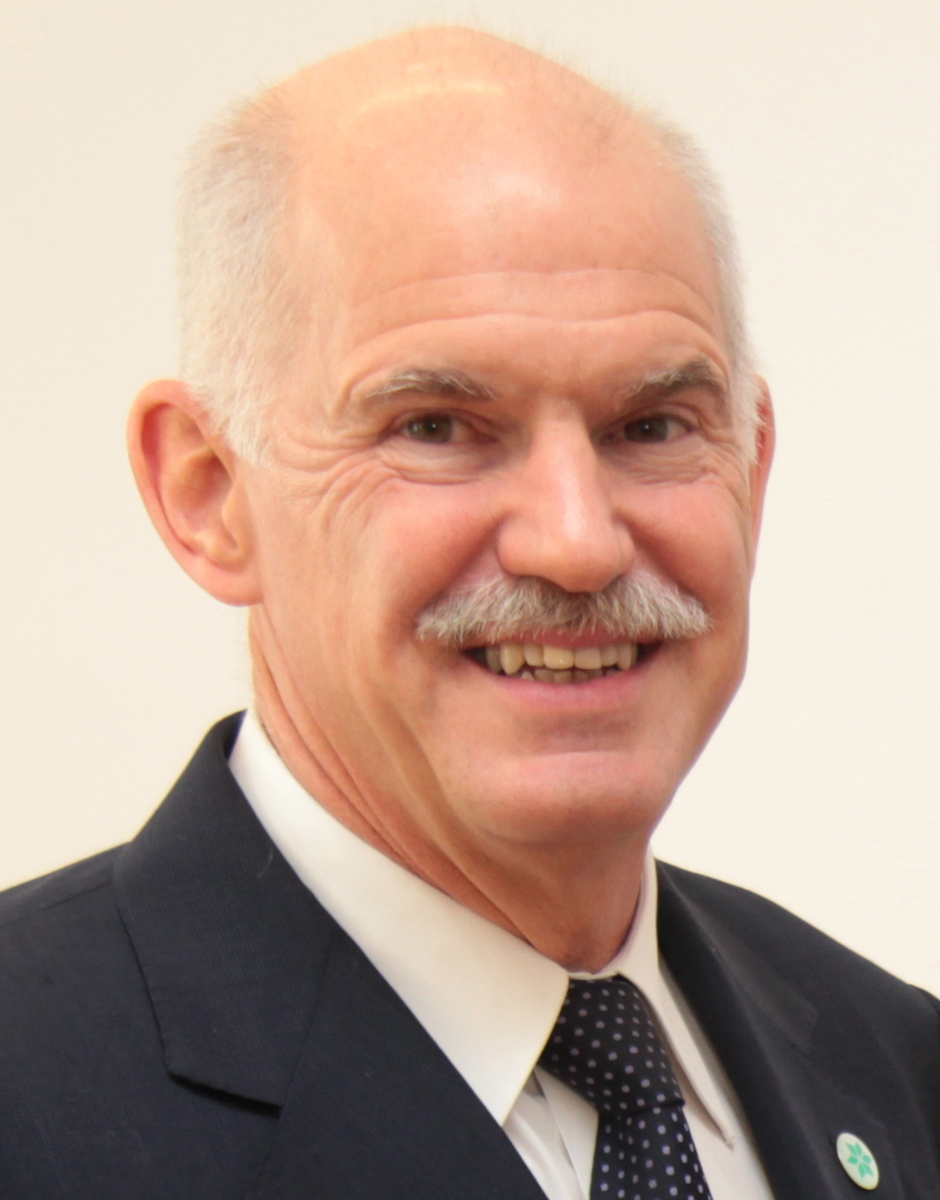

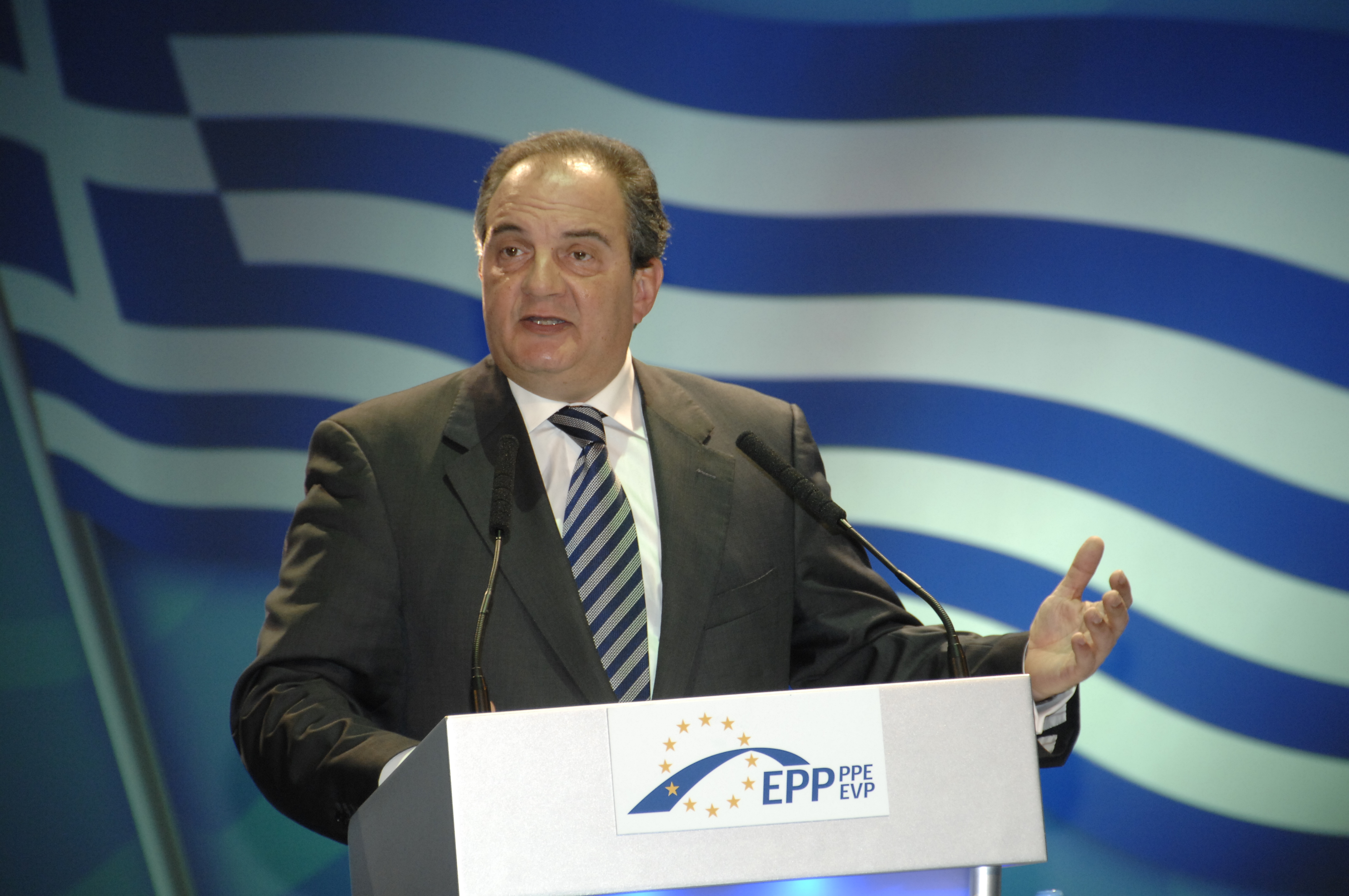

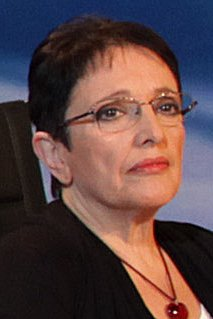

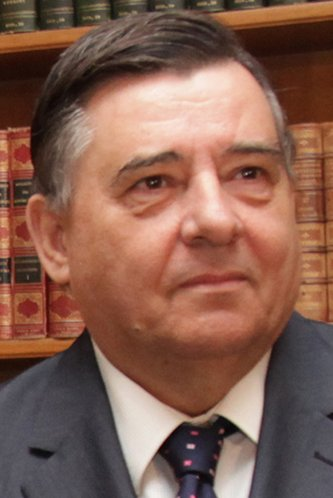

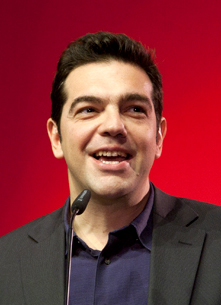
	First party	Second party	Third party
Leader	George Papandreou	Kostas Karamanlis	Aleka Papariga
Party	PASOK	ND	KKE
Last election	38.10%, 102 seats	41.87%, 152 seats	8.15%, 22 seats
Seats won	160	91	21
Seat change	▲58	▼61	▼1
Popular vote	3,012,542	2,295,719	517,249
Percentage	43.92%	33.47%	7.54%
Swing	▲5.82pp	▼8.40pp	▼0.71pp
	Fourth party	Fifth party
Leader	Georgios Karatzaferis	Alexis Tsipras
Party	LAOS	Syriza
Last election	3.80%, 10 seats	5.04%, 14 seats
Seats won	15	13
Seat change	▲5	▼1
Popular vote	386,205	315,665
Percentage	5.63%	4.60%
Swing	▲1.83pp	▼0.44pp
- Results by constituency
Prime Minister before election
Kostas Karamanlis
ND
Prime Minister after election
George Papandreou
PASOK

Early parliamentary elections were held in Greece on 4 October 2009. Elections were not required until September 2011, but on 2 September 2009 Prime Minister Kostas Karamanlis of New Democracy announced that he would request President Karolos Papoulias dissolve Parliament and call elections. Parliament was dissolved on 9 September.

The result was a victory for the opposition PASOK party led by George Papandreou, who became the new prime minister. New Democracy lost 61 of its 152 seats, with its vote share dropping by over 8 percentage points.

Voting was mandatory; however there are no sanctions or penalties for not voting.

== Participating parties ==
A total of 23 parties participated in the elections. Six of them participated in only one or two parliamentary constituencies.

- New Democracy
- PASOK
- Communist Party of Greece
- Popular Orthodox Rally
- Coalition of the Radical Left
- Ecologists Greens
- Marxist-Leninist Communist Party of Greece
- Communist Party of Greece (Marxist-Leninist)
- Workers Revolutionary Party
- Democratic Revival (Stelios Papathemelis)
- Union of Centrists (Vassilis Leventis)
- Popular Union – Chrysi Avyi
- Dimosthenis Vergis – Greek Ecologists
- Organization for the Reconstruction of the Communist Party of Greece
- Koinonia (Emmanouil Voloudakis)
- Democrats (Δημοκρατικοί) (M. Meletopoulos)
- Anticapitalist Left Cooperation for the Overthrow (ANTARSYA)
- Light – Truth – Justice (Φως – Αλήθεια – Δικαιοσύνη) (Konstantinos Melissourgos)^{2}
- Friends of Man (Φίλοι του Ανθρώπου) (K. Stamoulis)^{1}
- Regional Urban Development (Περιφερειακή Αστική Ανάπτυξη) (South Kolitsi)^{1}
- Old Republic (Παλαιά Δημοκρατία) (A. Daskalopoulos)^{1}
- Smoking Groups for Art and Artistic Creation (Καπνιστικές Ομάδες για την Τέχνη και την Εικαστική Συγκρότηση, ΚΟΤΕΣ), (Nikos Louvros)^{1}
- I Give Away Land, I Give Away Debts - Panagrarian Labour Movement of Greece (Χαρίζω Οικόπεδα, Χαρίζω Χρέη' - Παναγροτικό Εργατικό Κίνημα Ελλάδος), (M. Tzalazidis)^{2}
- ^{1} The party ran in one parliamentary constituency.
- ^{2} The party ran in two parliamentary constituencies.

== Opinion polls ==
Local regression trend line of poll results from 16 September 2007 to 4 October 2009, with each line corresponding to a political party.

== Events before the election ==
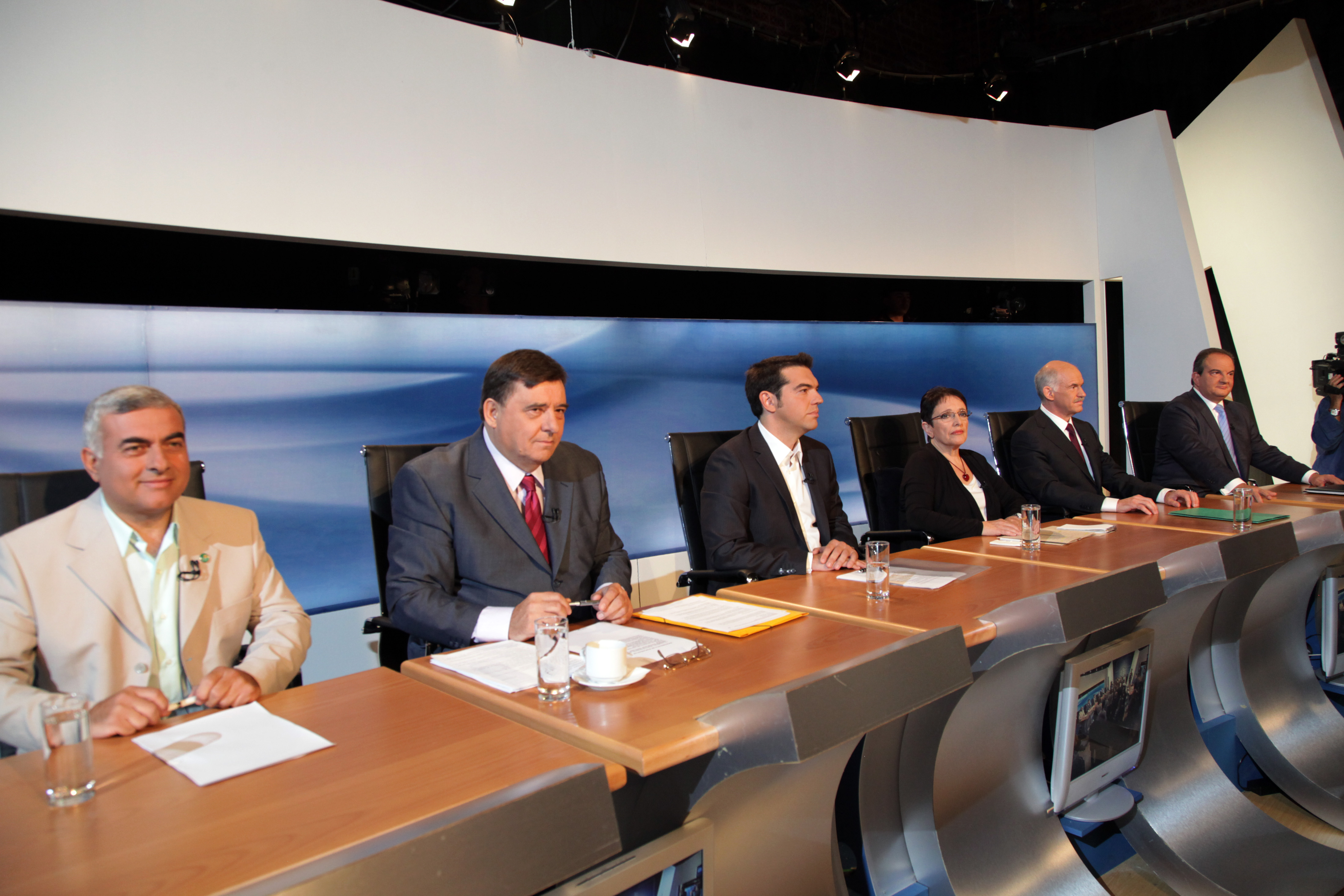
Leaders of the (L to R) Ecologist Greens, Popular Orthodox Rally, Coalition of the Radical Left, Communist Party, PASOK, and New Democracy parties before a televised debate

- September 11, 2009: "Ecologists Greece" announced their electoral alliance with the Popular Orthodox Rally (LAOS)
- September 16, 2009: A total of 28 parties submitted candidate lists to the Areios Pagos. The court will vet the candidacies' legal standing and officially declare lawful candidates within about a week. In past elections, some candidacies were rejected because the candidates had held certain public offices which they had not resigned in a timely fashion.
- September 21, 2009: NET state television, in simulcast with major commercial TV stations, broadcast the debate among the leaders of ND, PASOK, KKE, SYRIZA, LAOS, and the Ecologist Greens. The party leaders questioned by a team of journalists from the TV stations participating in the simulcast. Questions and responses were rotated and timed. Each party leader was allowed to place one question to one other party leader of their choice directly.
- September 21, 2009: The Areios Pagos announced the parties participating in the elections. 5 of the 28 applications were rejected; namely: "Ecologists Greece – Konstantinos Papanikolas – Political Catharsis", "Hellenic Direct Democracy Movement" (Ελληνικό Κίνημα Άμεσης Δημοκρατίας - Giorgos Kokkas), "New Greek Republic" (Νέα Ελληνική Δημοκρατία - N. Laskos), "Where are you, Papadopoulos? – Party of Greek Aliens – Terrorise the Terrorists" (Πού είσαι Παπαδόπουλε – Κόμμα Ελλήνων Αλλοδαπών – Τρομοκρατήστε τους Τρομοκράτες), "Future of the Greeks - Servants of the Greek People" (Μέλλον των Ελλήνων – Υπηρέτες του Ελληνικού Λαού - N. Skopelitis).
- September 22, 2009: The two likely prime ministers, Kostas Karamanlis and George Papandreou, debated for 75 minutes. The debate was divided in 5 sections (the economy, education, administration, the environment, and foreign policy). Both leaders had 2 sessions of 3 minutes and 1 session of 1 minute. The moderator had 1 minute to introduce the subject. The debate was moderated by journalist Maria Houkli, and was simulcast as per the multi-party debate above.
- October 3, 2009: It was announced that seven pollsters pooled their resources to conduct a joint exit poll, which was broadcast by all TV and news stations at 7 PM, the time when voting officially ended. The pollsters procured approximately 14,000 randomised responses and were aiming for a ±1.5% margin of error in their earliest predictions. Singular Logic, the IT contractor for the Ministry of Interior, implemented a secure system to obtain initial tallies from approximately 4,000 voting stations by SMS. They were thus able to project final results within ±0.2% by 9 PM and within ±0.1% by midnight.
- October 3, 2009: Publicised odds by international bookmakers were roughly in agreement with the latest predictions as outlined in the tables above. Sports betting is the only form of betting allowed in Greece.
- October 4, 2009: Voting commenced at 7 AM and was completed at 7 PM, in 20,937 stations throughout the country. Turnout was estimated at slightly more than 7 million.

== Exit polls and projections ==
The initial results of the exit poll conducted jointly by pollsters Alco, GPO, MARC, Metron Analysis, MRB, Opinion, and RASS were made public at 7 PM Eastern European DST:

Joint exit poll	October 4, 2009	ND	PASOK	KKE	Syriza	LAOS	EcoGreens	Others
Vote percentage	7 PM	34.3-37.3	41.0-44.0	7.3-8.3	3.9-4.9	5.0-6.0	2.0-3.0	-
Seats in Parliament	7 PM	94-100	151-159	20-22	11-13	14-16	0	-

The revised results of the exit poll conducted jointly by pollsters Alco, GPO, MARC, Metron Analysis, MRB, Opinion, and RASS were made public at 8:50 PM Eastern European DST. The margin of error claimed is less than 0.5%:

Joint exit poll	October 4, 2009	ND	PASOK	KKE	Syriza	LAOS	EcoGreens	Others
Vote percentage	8:50 PM	33.9	43.8	7.6	4.5	5.6	2.5	-
Seats in Parliament	8:50 PM	92	160	21	12	15	0	-

The statistical projections by Singular Logic and the Ministry of Interior, based on actual returns, were made public at 9 PM Eastern European DST. The margin of error claimed is 0.3%:

Statistical projection	October 4, 2009	ND	PASOK	KKE	Syriza	LAOS	EcoGreens	Others
Vote percentage	9 PM	33.8	43.8	7.6	4.5	5.6	2.5	2.2
Seats in Parliament	9 PM	92	160	21	12	15	0	-

== Results ==
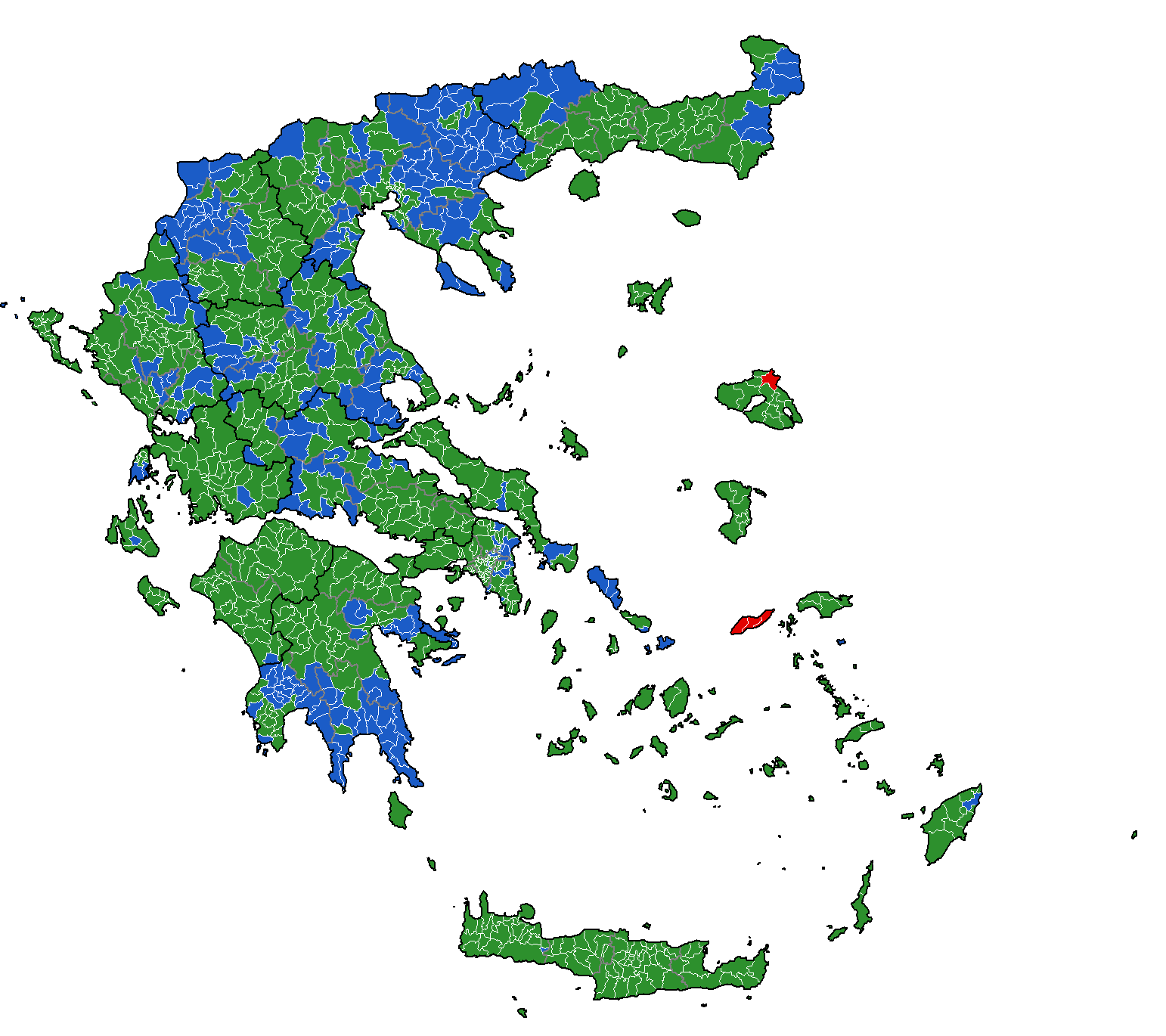
Results, showing the winning party in each municipal unit.

Party	Votes	%	+/–	Seats	+/–
PASOK	3,012,542	43.92	+5.82	160	+58
New Democracy	2,295,719	33.47	–8.37	91	–61
Communist Party of Greece	517,249	7.54	–0.61	21	–1
Popular Orthodox Rally	386,205	5.63	+1.83	15	+5
Syriza	315,665	4.60	–0.44	13	–1
Ecologist Greens	173,589	2.53	+1.48	0	0
Democratic Revival	30,784	0.45	–0.35	0	0
Antarsya	24,687	0.36	New	0	New
Greek Ecologists	19,993	0.29	+0.27	0	0
Golden Dawn	19,624	0.29	New	0	New
Union of Centrists	18,296	0.27	–0.02	0	0
Society	10,690	0.16	New	0	New
Communist Party of Greece (Marxist–Leninist)	10,480	0.15	–0.10	0	0
Democrats	7,600	0.11	New	0	New
Marxist–Leninist Communist Party of Greece	5,219	0.08	–0.03	0	0
Workers' Revolutionary Party	4,537	0.07	+0.03	0	0
Organization for the Reconstruction of the KKE	1,665	0.02	–0.01	0	0
Pan-Agrarian Labour Movement of Greece	1,375	0.02	New	0	New
Smoking Groups for Art and Visual Composition	1,355	0.02	New	0	New
Light – Truth – Justice	871	0.01	±0.00	0	0
Friends of Man	4	0.00	New	0	New
Regional Urban Development	4	0.00	±0.00	0	0
Old Republic	3	0.00	New	0	New
Independents	265	0.00	±0.00	0	0
Total	6,858,421	100.00	–	300	0
Valid votes	6,858,421	97.36			
Invalid votes	142,916	2.03			
Blank votes	43,269	0.61			
Total votes	7,044,606	100.00			
Registered voters/turnout	9,929,065	70.95			
Source: Ministry of Interior

=== By region ===
Region	PASOK		ND		KKE		LAOS		SYRIZA		OP	
Region	%	S	%	S	%	S	%	S	%	S	%	S
Attica	40.27	39	27.97	22	10.22	10	7.53	7	6.82	7	3.99	–
Central Greece	46.27	10	34.81	5	6.15	1	5.43	1	3.47	–	1.94	–
Central Macedonia	39.83	25	37.60	15	7.11	3	6.77	3	3.96	2	2.19	–
Crete	58.78	10	26.18	5	4.60	–	2.63	–	3.91	1	2.50	–
Eastern Macedonia and Thrace	47.56	12	36.38	5	3.87	–	5.34	–	3.55	–	1.53	–
Epirus	44.73	7	37.35	4	6.85	–	3.15	–	4.46	–	1.56	–
Ionian Islands	43.61	4	32.84	1	11.68	1	3.63	–	4.28	–	2.03	–
North Aegean	43.40	3	31.54	2	12.62	1	3.89	–	4.29	–	2.20	–
Peloponnese	42.26	10	40.91	8	4.89	–	5.00	–	3.49	–	1.75	–
South Aegean	50.87	6	32.88	2	4.42	–	4.15	–	3.49	–	2.35	–
Thessaly	42.10	11	37.04	7	8.66	2	5.00	2	3.63	1	1.85	–
Western Greece	52.03	12	32.25	7	5.91	2	3.29	1	3.20	1	1.74	–
Western Macedonia	42.88	6	41.35	4	5.47	–	3.76	–	3.21	–	1.47	–
Greece	43.92	5	33.47	4	7.54	1	5.63	1	4.60	1	2.53	–

=== By constituency ===
Constituency	PASOK (%)	ND (%)	KKE (%)	LAOS (%)	SYRIZA (%)
Achaea	52.65	28.99	6.60	3.64	3.89
Aetolia-Akarnania	49.45	35.73	6.23	3.03	2.82
Argolida	42.27	42.55	4.48	4.16	3.15
Arkadia	46.46	36.54	5.13	4.79	3.76
Arta	45.14	38.99	6.04	2.58	4.67
Athens A	35.52	31.75	9.55	7.59	7.98
Athens B	40.23	26.62	10.84	7.28	7.40
Attica	43.12	29.46	8.23	8.23	4.94
Boeotia	47.35	31.08	7.30	6.17	3.90
Cephalonia	41.83	33.04	12.25	4.67	3.73
Chalkidiki	41.02	40.47	5.00	5.47	4.05
Chania	51.11	29.73	5.98	3.64	4.37
Chios	49.81	33.94	5.38	3.55	3.37
Corfu	43.36	32.83	11.96	3.54	4.29
Corinthia	46.80	36.03	4.00	5.28	3.77
Dodecanese	54.93	30.74	3.96	4.12	2.71
Drama	41.63	41.26	3.82	6.33	3.26
Elis	54.64	32.75	4.32	3.08	2.57
Euboea	48.19	31.08	6.72	6.01	3.90
Evros	44.74	40.33	3.76	5.92	2.09
Evrytania	51.20	37.56	3.24	2.97	2.27
Florina	44.02	41.63	4.62	3.54	2.95
Grevena	46.91	36.64	7.31	3.56	2.60
Imathia	43.31	37.01	6.91	6.16	3.16
Ioannina	43.94	36.12	7.51	3.50	4.90
Heraklion	62.74	23.70	4.44	2.10	3.71
Karditsa	43.31	39.83	7.50	4.02	2.88
Kastoria	34.60	50.03	4.00	4.46	3.76
Kavala	42.41	37.38	6.00	6.01	4.06
Kilkis	40.85	39.93	7.26	6.39	2.49
Kozani	44.08	39.71	5.76	3.66	3.29
Laconia	36.47	47.26	4.80	5.59	2.84
Larissa	40.81	36.18	9.46	5.69	3.98
Lasithi	59.37	27.51	3.47	2.19	3.84
Lefkada	41.66	37.01	10.42	2.37	5.16
Lesvos	42.19	31.06	14.10	4.03	4.43
Magnesia	40.39	35.55	8.79	5.82	4.66
Messenia	39.06	43.26	5.74	5.07	3.62
Kyklades	44.89	36.03	5.10	4.19	4.64
Pella	43.04	41.48	4.36	5.51	2.52
Phocis	40.22	39.73	6.92	5.24	3.58
Phthiotis	43.85	40.35	4.92	4.66	2.82
Pieria	41.37	42.27	5.29	5.34	2.81
Piraeus A	38.88	32.97	8.11	7.56	5.83
Piraeus B	44.34	23.06	12.88	7.58	5.69
Preveza	42.98	38.89	8.04	3.09	3.88
Rethymno	57.91	27.41	3.75	3.10	3.90
Rhodope	53.08	34.52	2.48	3.61	4.27
Samos	38.34	29.72	18.05	3.97	5.13
Serres	37.10	46.77	5.02	5.36	2.52
Thesprotia	48.75	36.61	4.60	3.06	3.47
Thessaloniki A	39.11	30.30	9.53	8.26	5.77
Thessaloniki B	38.23	37.62	7.57	7.48	4.08
Trikala	45.14	37.63	8.22	3.80	2.54
Xanthi	58.79	26.21	2.75	4.41	4.56
Zakynthos	47.55	29.73	11.18	3.64	4.23

== Post-election events ==
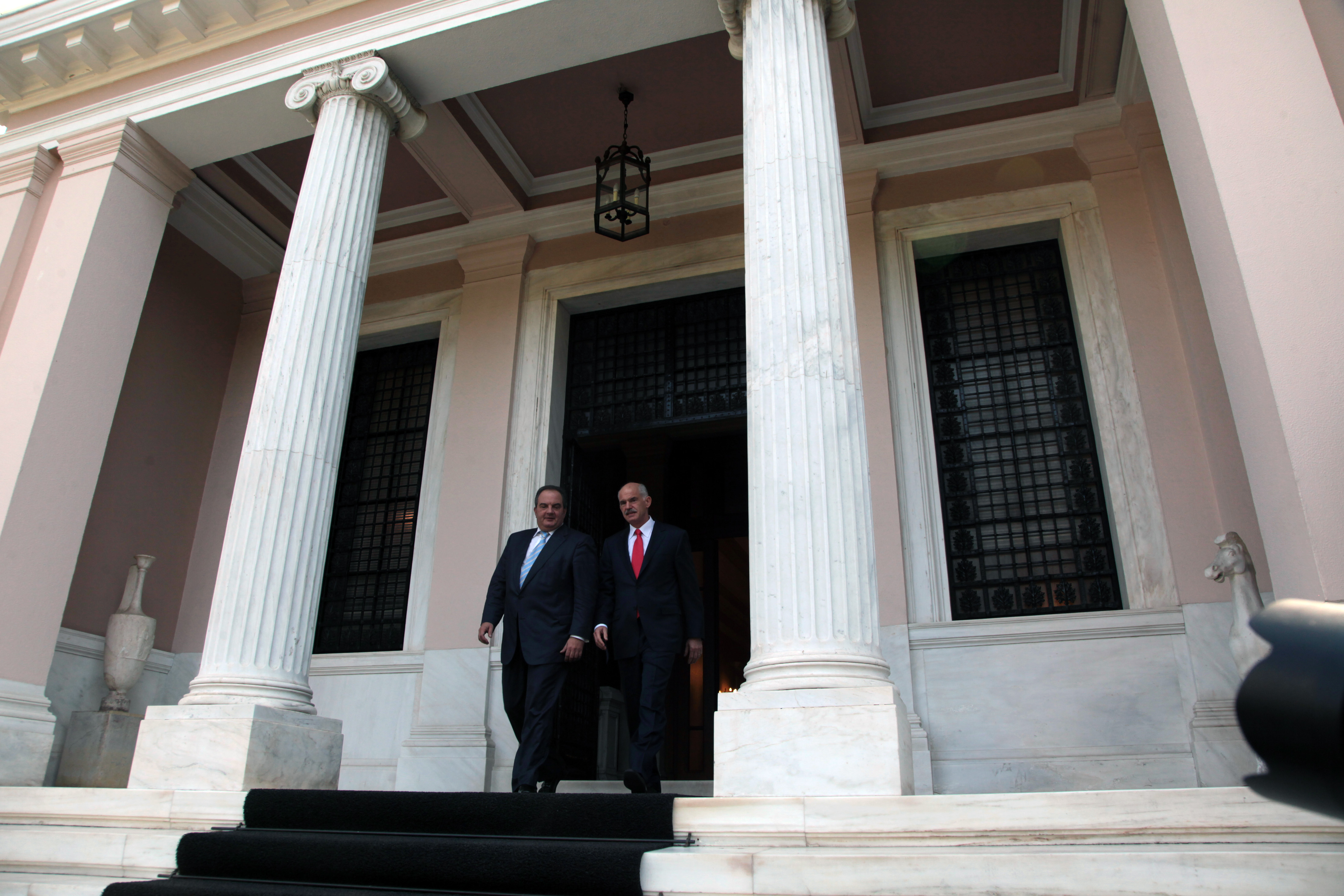
Former Prime Minister, Kostas Karamanlis and George Papandreou in the ceremony for the official handover at the Maximos Mansion.

- October 4, 2009: Incumbent Prime Minister and New Democracy party leader Kostas Karamanlis conceded defeat and stated that he is resigning his offices, and will not stand as candidate at the party convention summoned to elect his successor next month. The 33.5% tally marks a historic low for the party since its founding in 1974.
- October 5, 2009: The Speaker of the outgoing Parliament notified the President of the Republic about the election returns. Immediately afterwards incumbent Prime Minister Kostas Karamanlis tended his resignation to the President. PASOK leader George Papandreou was then summoned by the President and given a mandate to form a Cabinet as the Prime Minister-designate. PASOK Member of the European Parliament Stavros Lambrinidis said the result was "remarkable".
- October 6, 2009: George Papandreou was sworn in as prime minister at 11 am, and moved into the Máximos Mansion, the Prime Ministerial office. The names of the new ministers were announced at 7 pm. It became known that George Papandreou had offered the EcoGreens one of the two positions of Undersecretary for the Environment, but the offer was turned down.
- October 7, 2009: The new Cabinet was sworn in at 11 AM. The New Democracy party congress is to convene and elect its new leader at November 7, 2009.

== See also ==
- List of members of the Hellenic Parliament, 2009–2012
