= Opinion polling for the 2009 Greek parliamentary election =

In the run up to the 2009 Greek parliamentary election, various organizations carried out opinion polling to gauge voting intention in Greece during the term of the 13th Hellenic Parliament. Results of such polls are displayed in this article. The date range for these opinion polls is from the previous parliamentary election, held on 16 September 2007, to the day the next election was held, on 4 October 2009.

Polls are listed in reverse chronological order, showing the most recent first and using the dates when the survey fieldwork was done, as opposed to the date of publication. Where the fieldwork dates are unknown, the date of publication is given instead. The highest percentage figure in each polling survey is displayed with its background shaded in the leading party's colour. If a tie ensues, this is applied to the figures with the highest percentages. The "Lead" columns on the right shows the percentage-point difference between the parties with the highest percentages in a given poll.

== Voting intention estimates ==
=== Graphical summary ===
Local regression trend line of poll results from 16 September 2007 to 4 October 2009, with each line corresponding to a political party.

=== Polling ===
The table below lists nationwide voting intention estimates. Refusals are generally excluded from the party vote percentages, while question wording and the treatment of "don't know" responses and those not intending to vote may vary between polling organisations. Polls that show their results without disregarding those respondents who were undecided or said they would abstain from voting (either physically or by voting blank) have been re-calculated by disregarding these numbers from the totals offered through a simple rule of three in order to obtain results comparable to other polls and the official election results. When available, seat projections are displayed below the percentages in a smaller font. 151 seats are required for an absolute majority in the Hellenic Parliament.

Color key:

Exit poll

Polling firm/Commissioner	Fieldwork date	Sample size	ND	PASOK	KKE	SYRIZA	LAOS	OP	Lead
2009 parliamentary election	4 Oct 2009	—N/a	33.5; 91	43.9; 160	7.5; 21	4.6; 13	5.6; 15	2.5; 0	10.4
Singular Logic (Note: Quick count.)	4 Oct 2009 (21:00)	?	33.8; 92	43.8; 160	7.3; 21	4.5; 12	5.6; 15	2.5; 0	10.0
Metron–MRB–Rass–GPO–Alco–Marc	4 Oct 2009 (20:50)	12,080	33.9; 92	43.8; 160	7.6; 21	4.5; 12	5.6; 15	–	9.9
Metron–MRB–Rass–GPO–Alco–Marc	4 Oct 2009 (19:00)	12,080	34.3– 37.3; 94/100	41.0– 44.0; 151/159	7.3– 8.3; 20/22	3.9– 4.9; 11/13	5.0– 6.0; 14/16	2.0– 3.0; 0	6.7
GPO/Mega TV	16–18 Sep 2009	2,000	34.8	41.7	8.3	3.5	7.4	2.2	6.9
Metron Analysis/ANT1	16–18 Sep 2009	1,001	35.6; 96	43.5; 158	7.6; 21	3.8; 10	5.6; 15	2.5; 0	7.9
Marc/Alpha TV	16–18 Sep 2009	1,120	34.8; 95	42.3; 155	8.2; 22	4.1; 11	6.2; 17	2.3; 0	7.5
Alco/Alter TV	15–18 Sep 2009	1,000	35.0; 94	43.0; 158	7.4; 21	3.8; 11	6.3; 16	2.0; 0	8.0
Kapa Research/To Vima	17 Sep 2009	?	33.5	41.7	8.9	4.2	6.2	3.0	8.2
VPRC/tvxs	16–17 Sep 2009	713	35.0; 95/99	42.5; 154/159	8.0; 21/24	4.0; 11/12	6.0; 15/17	2.5; 0	7.5
Public Issue/Skai–Kathimerini	14–16 Sep 2009	?	35.5; 93/97	41.5; 153/159	8.5; 22/23	4.0; 10/11	6.0; 16	2.5; 0	6.0
Marc/Ethnos	14–16 Sep 2009	1,033	34.9; 95	41.6; 153	8.4; 23	4.2; 12	6.3; 17	2.2; 0	6.7
MRB/NewsTime	15 Sep 2009	1,009	35.0; 96	42.0; 155	8.0; 22	4.0; 11	6.0; 16	2.5; 0	7.0
Marc/Alpha TV	13–15 Sep 2009	1,141	34.9; 95	41.2; 153	8.3; 23	4.4; 12	6.1; 17	2.5; 0	6.3
Metron Analysis/ANT1	13–14 Sep 2009	1,003	33.7; 92	42.6; 157	8.5; 23	3.9; 11	6.3; 17	2.7; 0	8.9
GPO/Mega TV	12–14 Sep 2009	2,000	34.8	41.9	7.8	3.6	7.1	2.4	7.1
VPRC/tvxs	11–14 Sep 2009	?	34.5; 92	42.5; 159	8.5; 23	4.0; 11	5.5; 15	2.5; 0	8.0
MRB/Real News	13 Sep 2009	1,004	35.1	41.8	7.0	4.2	5.4	2.3	6.7
Alco/Proto Thema	9–11 Sep 2009	1,000	35.2; 98/100	42.5; 151/155	8.3; 21/23	3.7; 9/10	5.9; 15/17	2.1; 0	7.3
MRB/Real News	10 Sep 2009	1,005	35.1; 92/101	41.0; 148/156	8.4; 22/24	3.7; 9/12	6.6; 17/20	2.4; 0	5.9
Marc/Ethnos	8–10 Sep 2009	1,097	34.1	41.3	9.0	3.8	7.0	2.0	7.2
Rass/To Paron	7–10 Sep 2009	2,001	35.0	40.5	8.3	4.0	6.6	3.6	5.5
VPRC/tvxs	7–10 Sep 2009	1,415	35.5; 98	41.0; 152	8.0; 22	4.0; 11	6.0; 17	2.5; 0	5.5
Metron Analysis/ANT1	8–9 Sep 2009	1,002	35.2; 93	42.7; 153	8.1; 21	3.5; 9	5.7; 15	3.0; 8	7.5
Pulse RC/Apogevmatini	8 Sep 2009	1,050	36.9	42.4	6.5	4.1	4.7	3.0	5.5
Public Issue/Skai–Kathimerini	7–8 Sep 2009	1,067	35.5; 93/96	41.0; 151/157	8.5; 22/23	4.0; 10/11	7.0; 18/19	2.0; 0	5.5
Metron Analysis/ANT1	6–7 Sep 2009	1,005	35.5; 96	42.9; 156	7.5; 20	4.8; 13	5.5; 15	1.9; 0	7.4
GPO/Mega TV	3–7 Sep 2009	2,400	33.5	40.5	8.6	4.6	7.8	2.9	7.0
MRB/Real FM	6 Sep 2009	1,022	34.7	41.4	7.9	3.8	6.1	1.5	6.7
Alco/Proto Thema	3–4 Sep 2009	1,000	34.5; 99/102	42.3; 149/153	8.8; 22/24	4.0; 9/10	6.2; 15/17	2.5; 0	7.8
MRB/Real News	3–4 Sep 2009	1,005	34.2	41.7	7.6	3.3	6.9	2.3	7.5
Kapa Research/To Vima	3–4 Sep 2009	1,139	32.6	41.7	9.6	4.1	5.8	3.2	9.1
Rass/To Paron	31 Aug–4 Sep 2009	2,001	34.0	40.6	8.2	3.8	7.0	4.5	6.6
Metron Analysis/To Pontiki	28 Aug–1 Sep 2009	1,003	32.0; 86	40.2; 147	8.6; 23	4.9; 13	8.1; 22	3.5; 9	8.2
Marc/Ethnos	30 Aug 2009	?	32.8	40.2	9.3	3.8	6.8	2.4	7.4
Alco/Proto Thema	25–28 Aug 2009	1,000	32.7; 98/99	40.3; 148/149	9.5; 23/24	4.5; 9/10	6.7; 17/18	2.8; 0	7.6
Alco/Proto Thema	20–24 Jul 2009	1,000	33.2	39.4	9.6	5.2	6.3	3.5	6.2
Marc/Ethnos	12 Jul 2009	?	34.4	40.6	8.4	4.2	6.8	3.5	6.2
Metron Analysis/Imerisia	16 Jun–6 Jul 2009	2,201	34.1	38.8	8.7	4.2	7.7	4.5	4.7
Public Issue/Skai–Kathimerini	1–3 Jul 2009	1,043	34.0; 94	40.0; 150	8.5; 23	5.0; 14	7.0; 19	2.5; 0	6.0
Public Issue/Skai–Kathimerini	15–17 Jun 2009	1,053	35.0; 95	41.0; 151	8.0; 22	5.0; 13	7.0; 19	2.5; 0	6.0
2009 EP election	7 Jun 2009	—N/a	32.3	36.6	8.4	4.7	7.1	3.5	4.3
MRB	21 May–1 Jun 2009	2,100	33.5	37.2	7.8	5.3	5.5	8.2	3.7
Alco/Proto Thema	25–28 May 2009	1,000	32.9	37.2	8.2	5.8	5.0	8.2	4.3
Rass/To Paron	25–28 May 2009	2,001	33.2	36.4	7.9	5.9	5.9	7.4	3.2
Alco/Alter TV	23–27 May 2009	1,000	33.0	37.4	7.8	5.7	4.7	7.8	4.4
Alco/Alter TV	18–22 May 2009	1,000	33.6	38.9	8.2	5.4	4.6	7.3	5.3
VPRC/tvxs	20–21 May 2009	1,024	32.0	37.5	8.0	6.5	5.0	7.5	5.5
Marc/Alpha TV	14–18 May 2009	1,242	32.9	39.1	9.2	6.0	5.1	5.1	6.2
Alco/Proto Thema	12–16 May 2009	1,000	32.8	38.1	8.2	6.8	5.5	5.7	5.3
Rass/To Paron	11–15 May 2009	2,001	32.7	36.0	9.6	9.1	6.3	4.3	3.3
Interview/Makedonia tis Kyriakis	6–12 May 2009	1,004	36.6	39.4	7.7	4.6	4.6	4.5	2.8
Marc/Ethnos	10 May 2009	?	33.6	38.8	9.2	6.7	5.0	5.0	5.2
Alco/Proto Thema	6–8 May 2009	1,000	33.4	38.9	8.8	6.6	5.5	3.3	5.5
Focus/Real News	6–7 May 2009	?	34.7	38.6	9.0	6.5	4.7	4.7	3.9
Interview/Makedonia tis Kyriakis	4–6 May 2009	?	34.2	37.3	8.6	6.9	4.7	6.5	3.1
Public Issue/Skai–Kathimerini	4–5 May 2009	1,058	35.0; 92/95	40.5; 146/150	7.0; 19	8.0; 21/22	5.0; 13/14	3.5; 0/9	5.5
MRB/Eleftheros Typos	29–30 Apr 2009	1,213	34.4	38.0	7.7	7.2	5.6	4.3	3.6
Rass/To Paron	27–30 Apr 2009	2,001	34.2	37.6	8.6	8.7	5.7	3.7	3.4
GPO/Anatropi	28 Apr 2009	?	32.1	37.4	9.0	8.3	6.3	5.2	5.3
VPRC/Eleftherotypia	4–28 Apr 2009	1,204	32.5	37.0	8.0	9.0	5.0	5.0	4.5
Kapa Research/To Vima	7–13 Apr 2009	2,089	34.3	39.6	8.3	7.1	5.0	4.6	5.3
VPRC/tvxs	20 Mar–13 Apr 2009	935	34.0	37.0	8.0	8.5	4.5	5.0	3.0
Alco/Proto Thema	5 Apr 2009	?	33.8; 99	39.8; 149	9.7 ?	6.7 ?	5.0 ?	3.2 ?	6.0
Public Issue/Skai–Kathimerini	1–4 Apr 2009	1,024	34.0; 89/92	41.5; 149/152	7.0; 19	8.5; 22/23	5.0; 13/14	3.0; 0/8	7.5
MRB/Eleftheros Typos	1–2 Apr 2009	1,110	34.3	38.6	8.4	7.9	5.9	3.2	4.3
GPO/Mega TV	26–30 Mar 2009	1,400	32.8	38.3	9.1	8.0	6.3	3.8	5.5
Marc/Ethnos	29 Mar 2009	?	34.2	40.1	8.6	7.5	4.7	3.3	5.9
Metron Analysis/Imerisia	6–29 Mar 2009	2,213	34.3; 90	39.7; 144	8.7; 23	6.9; 18	5.7; 15	3.9; 10	5.4
Alco/Proto Thema	22 Mar 2009	?	34.0	39.4	9.7	7.0	5.4	2.7	5.4
Rass/To Paron	17–20 Mar 2009	2,002	35.6	39.4	8.3	6.9	5.1	3.6	3.8
Alco/Alter TV	11–17 Mar 2009	1,000	34.4	39.5	9.8	6.7	4.9	3.0	5.1
Focus/Real News	15 Mar 2009	?	33.7	37.4	8.7	8.4	4.5	–	3.7
Rass/To Paron	9–12 Mar 2009	2,002	34.3	37.2	8.2	9.2	5.9	3.7	2.9
Public Issue/Skai–Kathimerini	3–6 Mar 2009	1,018	35.0; 92/95	40.0; 145/148	8.5; 23	7.5; 20/21	5.0; 13	3.0; 0/7	5.0
MRB/Eleftheros Typos	4–5 Mar 2009	1,004	35.3	39.9	8.2	7.3	4.7	2.9	4.6
Rass/To Paron	23–26 Feb 2009	2,002	34.5	37.7	9.1	8.4	5.0	3.6	3.2
GPO/Mega TV	19–23 Feb 2009	1,400	33.4	38.1	8.7	8.2	6.5	3.4	4.7
Focus/Real News	15 Feb 2009	?	33.3	37.2	8.4	7.7	5.4	4.2	3.9
Marc/Ethnos	14 Feb 2009	?	34.7	39.6	8.4	8.1	4.7	2.7	4.9
Alco/Proto Thema	14 Feb 2009	?	33.8	39.3	8.7	7.5	4.8	2.5	5.5
Metron Analysis/Avgi	8 Feb 2009	?	32.9	37.2	8.5	8.7	5.0	4.5	4.3
Public Issue/Skai–Kathimerini	2–8 Feb 2009	1,020	34.0; 89	38.5; 141	8.5; 23	10.0; 26	4.5; 12	3.5; 9	4.5
Kapa Research/To Vima	7 Feb 2009	?	34.0	38.2	9.1	8.6	4.9	3.9	4.2
MRB/Eleftheros Typos	4–5 Feb 2009	1,001	34.6	39.4	7.8	8.5	5.1	2.9	4.8
Alco/Proto Thema	1 Feb 2009	?	33.6	38.6	9.1	7.9	4.8	3.5	5.0
GPO/Mega TV	25–27 Jan 2009	?	32.8	37.0	9.0	9.3	6.7	3.5	4.2
Rass/To Paron	19–23 Jan 2009	2,001	35.7	38.3	8.6	8.1	4.9	3.2	2.6
Marc/Ethnos	18 Jan 2009	?	34.9	40.1	8.5	8.6	4.4	1.8	5.2
Public Issue/Skai–Kathimerini	7–13 Jan 2009	1,023	33.0; 87	38.0; 140	8.5; 22	10.0; 26	5.5; 14	4.0; 11	5.0
MRB/Eleftheros Typos	8 Jan 2009	1,005	35.1	38.7	8.1	9.3	4.9	2.7	3.6
GPO/Mega TV	23 Dec 2008	?	31.4	37.2	9.3	9.9	6.8	3.6	5.8
VPRC/Avgi	18 Dec 2008	?	31.0	37.5	8.5	12.0	5.0	4.5	6.5
Kapa Research/To Vima	17–18 Dec 2008	?	33.6	39.0	9.0	8.7	4.6	4.0	5.4
Rass/To Paron	15–18 Dec 2008	2,001	35.4	38.6	9.0	7.2	5.1	3.7	3.2
Public Issue/Skai–Kathimerini	15–17 Dec 2008	1,041	32.5; 86	38.5; 142	8.0; 21	12.0; 32	4.0; 10	3.5; 9	6.0
Marc/Ethnos	7 Dec 2008	?	33.4	39.4	8.3	9.4	5.1	2.7	6.0
Public Issue/Skai–Kathimerini	2–6 Dec 2008	1,013	33.0; 87	37.5; 138	7.5; 20	13.0; 34	4.5; 12	3.5; 9	4.5
Metron Analysis/Mega TV	4 Dec 2008	?	33.3; 83/95	39.6; 139/152	7.8 ?	9.6 ?	4.5 ?	2.8 ?	6.3
MRB	21 Nov–1 Dec 2008	2,100	32.8; 87	38.6; 143	8.3; 22	9.6; 26	4.7; 12	3.5; 10	5.8
Alco/Proto Thema	30 Nov 2008	?	33.1	38.8	9.6	9.8	4.8	2.0	5.7
GPO/Mega TV	25 Nov 2008	?	31.1	36.0	8.3	12.2	6.7	3.3	4.9
Focus/Real News	23 Nov 2008	?	32.8	37.6	7.9	11.9	4.6	–	4.8
VPRC/Eleftherotypia	23 Nov 2008	1,199	32.5	37.0	8.0	13.0	4.0	4.5	4.5
Rass/Apogevmatini	18–21 Nov 2008	2,002	35.6	36.8	8.5	9.7	4.8	3.4	1.2
Alco/Proto Thema	11–13 Nov 2008	1,000	33.6	38.0	8.8	10.0	5.0	1.6	4.4
Marc/Ethnos	8 Nov 2008	?	33.9	37.6	8.8	10.2	5.5	–	3.7
MRB/Eleftheros Typos	5–6 Nov 2008	1,007	35.3	38.1	7.2	10.0	4.4	3.2	2.8
Public Issue/Skai–Kathimerini	4–6 Nov 2008	1,019	34.0; 89	37.5; 138	7.5; 20	12.0; 32	5.0; 13	3.0; 8	3.5
Rass/To Paron	3–6 Nov 2008	2,002	35.9	36.4	8.5	9.9	4.7	3.3	0.5
Metron Analysis/ANT1	27–28 Oct 2008	?	33.5; 89	36.6; 137	8.1; 22	10.7; 28	5.1; 13	4.1; 11	3.1
GPO/Mega TV	18 Oct 2008	?	32.2	33.9	8.1	14.6	6.5	2.4	1.7
Alco/Proto Thema	15–17 Oct 2008	1,000	33.7	36.1	9.7	10.8	5.1	2.0	2.4
Marc/Ethnos	12 Oct 2008	?	34.6	36.4	8.1	12.1	4.6	2.7	1.8
Metron Analysis/ANT1	6–7 Oct 2008	?	34.1	34.6	8.1	12.8	4.8	3.9	0.5
Public Issue/Skai–Kathimerini	1–4 Oct 2008	1,023	35.0; 94	36.0; 137	8.0; 22	12.5; 34	5.0; 13	2.5; 0	1.0
Rass/To Paron	29 Sep–3 Oct 2008	2,000	35.9	35.7	8.3	10.7	5.1	3.1	0.2
MRB/Eleftheros Typos	1–2 Oct 2008	1,050	35.8	35.9	7.9	11.0	5.3	2.4	0.1
Kapa Research/Sfina	27 Sep–1 Oct 2008	3,274	35.7	36.5	8.4	10.0	5.2	3.2	0.8
GPO/Mega TV	30 Sep 2008	?	32.8	34.2	8.2	13.9	6.3	2.2	1.4
Kapa Research/Apogevmatini	29 Sep 2008	1,024	35.9	36.0	8.3	10.7	5.2	–	0.1
VPRC/Eleftherotypia	22–24 Sep 2008	1,012	32.5	34.5	8.0	14.0	4.5	4.5	2.0
Alco/Proto Thema	19 Sep 2008	?	33.2	35.7	8.5	10.8	6.1	2.5	2.5
Rass/To Paron	16–18 Sep 2008	1,501	35.0	34.4	9.2	11.6	5.3	3.1	0.6
Alco/Alter TV	15–18 Sep 2008	1,000	33.2	35.5	8.4	10.6	6.4	2.7	2.3
MRB/Eleftheros Typos	16–17 Sep 2008	1,001	34.1	35.5	8.1	12.6	5.3	3.2	1.4
Opinion/To Vima	15–17 Sep 2008	1,000	32.1	35.2	7.8	12.6	5.3	4.5	3.1
Metron Analysis/ANT1	14–15 Sep 2008	1,003	32.5	35.2	8.3	13.2	5.6	2.7	2.7
Public Issue/Skai–Kathimerini	4–9 Sep 2008	1,044	34.0; 133	32.5; 88	8.0; 22	15.5; 42	5.5; 15	2.0; 0	1.5
Metron Analysis/ANT1	7–8 Sep 2008	?	33.5	33.2	8.8	13.8	5.3	3.6	0.3
MRB/Eleftheros Typos	3–4 Sep 2008	1,004	35.5	33.0	8.6	13.1	5.5	2.8	2.5
GPO/Mega TV	2 Sep 2008	?	34.6	31.9	9.0	12.6	6.7	2.0	2.7
Metron Analysis/To Pontiki	27 Aug–1 Sep 2008	1,001	35.4	32.4	8.8	13.5	5.3	2.8	3.0
Kapa Research/To Vima	26–29 Aug 2008	1,604	35.0	33.5	9.1	14.0	6.0	–	1.5
Marc/Ethnos	9–15 Jul 2008	1,105	33.9	30.0	8.8	18.1	5.5	1.3	3.9
VPRC/Eleftherotypia	10 Jun–10 Jul 2008	1,260	34.0	30.5	8.0	16.0	5.0	3.5	3.5
Public Issue/Skai–Kathimerini	1–3 Jul 2008	1,028	34.5; 133	31.0; 84	8.0; 22	18.0; 48	5.0; 13	–	3.5
MRB/Eleftheros Typos	1–2 Jul 2008	1,006	36.2	31.3	8.4	15.3	4.7	2.0	4.9
Kapa Research/To Vima	29 Jun 2008	?	34.0	28.9	9.8	16.1	5.0	–	5.1
Metron Analysis/Mega TV	11–29 Jun 2008	2,203	35.7	31.7	9.0	14.7	5.5	2.0	4.0
MRB/Alpha TV	21–22 Jun 2008	1,007	36.3	30.5	8.1	17.2	4.3	1.4	5.8
Metron Analysis/ANT1	12–13 Jun 2008	?	37.2	30.4	9.1	13.0	6.3	2.5	6.8
Rass/To Paron	2–5 Jun 2008	1,201	36.8	33.2	7.2	15.2	4.9	1.2	3.6
Public Issue/Skai–Kathimerini	2–5 Jun 2008	1,022	35.0; 134	31.5; 85	8.0; 22	17.5; 47	4.5; 12	–	3.5
MRB	23 May–2 Jun 2008	2,101	37.6	34.2	7.5	12.9	4.4	1.6	3.4
GPO/Mega TV	28–30 May 2008	1,000	34.9	30.9	8.0	14.6	5.7	1.2	4.0
Alco/Proto Thema	21–23 May 2008	1,000	35.4	33.1	8.8	14.4	4.5	–	2.3
MRB/Eleftheros Typos	20–21 May 2008	1,005	36.5	32.8	7.4	15.1	4.4	1.2	3.7
Rass/To Paron	6–8 May 2008	1,003	37.1	32.9	8.5	15.1	4.0	1.3	4.2
Public Issue/Skai–Kathimerini	5–8 May 2008	1,013	37.0; 139	31.0; 83	7.0; 19	17.5; 47	4.5; 12	–	6.0
Marc/Ethnos	21–30 Apr 2008	1,003	35.5	32.5	8.1	17.5	4.0	–	3.0
GPO/Mega TV	10–14 Apr 2008	?	34.7	31.4	8.0	15.7	5.7	1.1	3.3
Kapa Research/To Vima	13 Apr 2008	?	35.0	30.3	8.7	17.8	5.8	–	4.7
MRB/Eleftheros Typos	9–10 Apr 2008	1,007	36.4	32.2	7.3	17.4	4.2	1.2	4.2
Alco/Proto Thema	8–10 Apr 2008	1,000	35.2	30.6	8.4	17.8	4.7	–	4.6
MRB/Alpha TV	5–6 Apr 2008	1,007	35.9	31.8	7.4	17.1	4.5	1.1	4.1
Rass/To Paron	1–3 Apr 2008	1,003	35.3	31.8	7.1	19.0	4.5	1.1	3.5
Public Issue/Skai–Kathimerini	31 Mar–3 Apr 2008	1,005	37.0; 139	30.5; 82	7.0; 19	18.0; 48	4.5; 12	–	6.5
MRB/Alpha TV	15–16 Mar 2008	1,003	35.2	29.5	7.8	19.0	4.8	1.5	5.7
Metron Analysis/ANT1	27 Feb–14 Mar 2008	2,207	33.5	29.0	7.8	20.5	5.6	2.3	4.5
MRB/Eleftheros Typos	12–13 Mar 2008	1,003	35.1; 139/140	28.9; 82/84	7.6; 18/20	19.4; 46/48	5.1; 11/12	1.2; 0	6.2
Rass/To Paron	11–13 Mar 2008	1,201	34.5	28.0	8.9	20.2	4.8	1.6	6.5
Alco/Proto Thema	9 Mar 2008	?	32.9	28.4	8.9	21.2	5.5	–	4.5
Public Issue/Skai–Kathimerini	3–6 Mar 2008	1,019	37.5; 140	31.0; 83	7.5; 20	17.0; 46	4.0; 11	–	6.5
GPO/Mega TV	3 Mar 2008	?	33.9	28.2	9.3	17.7	6.1	1.9	5.7
VPRC	24 Feb 2008	?	38.0	34.0	8.0	12.0	4.0	1.5	4.0
MRB/Alpha TV	23–24 Feb 2008	1,002	36.3	32.2	8.0	13.5	5.2	1.8	4.1
Kapa Research/To Vima	19–22 Feb 2008	6,379	34.1	27.2	8.8	21.6	6.0	–	6.9
Marc/Ethnos	14–20 Feb 2008	1,019	34.9	31.9	8.0	18.2	4.3	–	3.0
MRB/Alpha TV	12–13 Feb 2008	1,016	37.5	33.1	8.2	12.1	4.9	1.9	4.4
Public Issue/Skai–Kathimerini	5–8 Feb 2008	1,023	38.5; 143	35.0; 94	7.5; 20	11.5; 31	4.5; 12	–	3.5
GPO/Mega TV	25 Jan–2 Feb 2008	?	37.1	32.4	10.3	9.7	5.8	1.6	4.7
MRB/Alpha TV	27–28 Jan 2008	1,012	38.2	33.9	9.1	10.3	4.7	–	4.3
Metron Analysis/To Pontiki	16–20 Jan 2008	1,000	36.2	34.3	9.6	10.2	5.4	2.1	1.9
MRB/Eleftheros Typos	16–17 Jan 2008	1,002	38.0	35.3	9.1	9.0	4.2	–	2.7
Public Issue/Skai–Kathimerini	10–15 Jan 2008	1,014	39.5; 146	37.0; 100	8.0; 21/22	8.0; 21/22	4.0; 11	–	2.5
Rass/To Paron	7–10 Jan 2008	1,203	37.0	34.1	9.2	9.0	5.6	2.5	2.9
Metron Analysis/ANT1	4–7 Jan 2008	1,005	35.8	34.1	10.9	10.2	5.1	2.1	1.7
Marc/Ethnos	17–20 Dec 2007	1,244	38.9	35.2	9.6	8.0	4.3	–	3.7
GPO/Mega TV	7–10 Dec 2007	?	38.5	35.4	9.7	6.9	5.6	–	3.1
Public Issue/Skai–Kathimerini	4–7 Dec 2007	1,021	41.0	38.0	8.0	6.0	4.0	–	3.0
Metron Analysis	21 Nov–7 Dec 2007	2,207	38.6	37.4	9.0	7.1	5.1	1.8	1.2
MRB	22 Nov–3 Dec 2007	2,100	40.6	37.8	8.6	5.5	3.8	–	2.8
Metron Analysis/ANT1	14–15 Nov 2007	?	40.7	36.9	8.5	6.2	4.6	1.5	3.8
MRB/Alpha TV	8 Nov 2007	1,009	41.8	37.3	7.5	7.0	3.4	–	4.5
MRB/Alpha TV	31 Oct 2007	1,007	41.8	36.9	–	–	–	–	4.9
Marc/Ethnos	22–24 Oct 2007	1,113	42.2	38.8	8.3	4.9	2.9	–	3.4
2007 parliamentary election	16 Sep 2007	—N/a	41.8; 152	38.1; 102	8.2; 22	5.0; 14	3.8; 10	1.1; 0	3.7
