= Domingo Tortorelli =

Uruguayan politician (1902–1990)

- Born: May 22, 1902; Montevideo, Uruguay
- Died: 1990; Montevideo, Uruguay
- Other names: "The Savior of the Fatherland", "The Artigas Patriot", "The Political DDT"
- Occupations: Politician, farmer
- Known for: Eccentric campaign promises (e.g., "downhill highways")
- Political party: Labor Party of Uruguay (Partido Laborista del Uruguay); The Concordance (La Concordancia)
- Spouse: Anatolia Manrupe

Domingo Tortorelli (May 22, 1902 – 1990) was an Uruguayan politician and perennial candidate who ran for the Chamber of Representatives in 1938 and for President of Uruguay in the general elections of 1942 and 1950.

Tortorelli is best remembered in Uruguayan political history for his absurd and populist campaign promises, such as installing free milk taps on street corners, constructing a highway that would run strictly "downhill" from Rivera to Montevideo to save fuel, and implementing a fifteen-minute workday.

== Biography ==
=== Early life ===
Tortorelli was born in Montevideo, the son of Luis Tortorelli, a surveyor and merchant, and Catalina Lucrecia D'Alessandro. He studied agronomy but abandoned his studies to dedicate himself to farming. He married Anatolia Manrupe, a wealthy woman older than him, who financed his political campaigns and frequently accompanied him during his speeches.

=== Political career and style ===
Influenced by the rhetorical styles of Benito Mussolini and Juan Domingo Perón, Tortorelli used to deliver speeches from the balcony of his home located near the intersection of 18 de Julio Avenue and Dr. Juan Paullier Street. During one campaign, he reportedly delivered 602 speeches. His public appearances drew large crowds, often stopping traffic. His followers nicknamed him "The Political DDT" (a play on the insecticide and his initials: Don Domingo Tortorelli).

Tortorelli promoted his government program through his party's official organ, the newspaper La Voz de Tortorelli ("The Voice of Tortorelli").

=== Electoral history ===
He ran for office three times without success:

- 1938: Candidate for the Chamber of Representatives under the party "La Concordancia" (The Concordance), List 200. He received 69 votes in Montevideo.
- 1942: Candidate for President with Luis Pagani as his Vice Presidential candidate. He received 40 votes.
- 1950: Candidate for President under the "Labor Concordance" party, with his wife Anatolia Manrupe as his running mate. He received 38 votes.

== Proposals ==
Tortorelli is famous for his surreal and populist campaign promises, which have become part of Uruguayan political folklore. Some of his most notable proposals included:

- Constructing a highway from Rivera to Montevideo that would be built entirely on a downward slope to save fuel for vehicles.
- Installation of milk taps on every street corner.
- Drastically reducing working hours to just fifteen minutes a day.
- A decree requiring all Uruguayans to marry upon reaching the age of 25 to promote birth rates.
- Guaranteeing a government job for every citizen turning 18.
- Transforming Valle Edén in Tacuarembó Department into a replica of Venice, complete with gondolas.
- Installing a roof over the Estadio Centenario, providing free cinemas, and lowering the price of wine and yerba mate.

== Legacy ==
The phrase "worthy of Tortorelli" (digno de Tortorelli) is sometimes used in Uruguayan politics to describe ridiculous or impossible proposals made by politicians.

Tortorelli served as the inspiration for the satirical character "Pinchinatti", created and portrayed by the renowned Uruguayan actor Ricardo Espalter, who parodied populist politicians. In 2019, Uruguayan President Tabaré Vázquez compared the proposals of candidate Juan Sartori to those of Tortorelli.

== See also ==
- Politics of Uruguay
- List of frivolous political parties
