= Party of the Dead =

Party of the Dead Партия мёртвых
- Leader: Maxim Evstropov
- Founded: 2017
- Preceded by: {rodina}
- Ideology: Political satire Art activism Anarchism
- Political position: Joke party
- Colours: Black; White
- Slogan: "Vote for the party of the dead, because there are more dead. By voting for the Party of the Dead, you choose the future, because your future is us"

Website
- deadrevolution.tilda.ws

The Party of the Dead (Russian: Партия мёртвых, romanized: Partiya myortvykh) is a Russian art activist project created in 2017 by members of the Rodina art group and artist Maxim Evstropov.

== Background ==
Several similar art projects can be noted in the post-Soviet space, bearing a similar name and having common elements of an artistic concept. Namely, the “Party of the Dead of Latvia”, the “Party of the Dead” of Eduard Limonov and National Bolshevik Party and the “Party of the Dead” of the Moscow artist Lena Hades. So, in one of the interviews, the artist Maxim Evstropov noted that the idea of his “Party of the Dead” is partly “also a parody of the Nazbols”.

=== "Party of the Dead of Latvia" ===
It was founded by Riga art activists from the association "Red Orchestra" in 1998. Due to the closeness of the activists to the National Bolshevik Party, the "Party of the Dead of Latvia" is sometimes erroneously called an NBP art project. Theodor Nette was called "the locomotive of the Party of the Dead", and one of the tasks of the party was to nominate him for the presidency of Latvia in the next elections.

==== "Party of the Dead of Latvia" and the NBP ====
Subsequently, the Party of the Dead of Latvia showed active solidarity and complicity with the actions of the National Bolshevik Party. So, in the city of Daugavpils, local activists distributed election leaflets “Party of the Dead. List No. Zero”, which announced the intentions of the party to run for the Daugavpils City Council. The party's announced candidates included Boris Savinkov, Roman Ungern, Vladimir Mayakovsky, Vasily Chapaev, Sergei Eisenstein, Tommaso Marinetti, Ernesto Che Guevara, Andreas Baader, Yasser Arafat, Yuri Gagarin, Aleister Crowley, Benito Mussolini, Nestor Makhno, Yakov Blumkin and Lee Harvey Oswald. According to the activists, each of the party members has already demonstrated "his competence in word and deed" and compares favorably with the current deputies, "that they fool naive townsfolk in order to get coveted mandates».

==== "Party of the Dead" of Eduard Limonov ====
Later, the founder of the National Bolshevik Party and writer Eduard Limonov published several books under the general subtitle "The Book of the Dead". In these books, the concept of the “Party of the Dead” also appeared, similar to that which was founded by the activists of the “Red Orchestra”. In these books, Limonov published essays on the figures of the past, which inspired his respect.

The term "party of the dead" in the NBP referred to the list of dead party members, which included, for example, Yuriy Chervochkin, Andrei Suhorada and many others. Obituaries were published in the Limonka newspaper under the heading “Memento mori. Party of the Dead".

=== "Party of the Dead" of Lena Hades ===
The "Party of the Dead" by Moscow artist Lena Hades was founded in 2010. The main information resource of the party was the artist's blog in LiveJournal, and the manifesto "VERITAS Genre in Fine Arts", written by the artist in 1995, became the basis of the "political program". The activity of the party is mainly virtual, and the objects of activity are works of art, mainly fine art, created by the artist herself. Although the party of Hades showed the greatest activity only in 2020, having recorded several videos about the history of the "Party of the Dead". The latest statements about the activity of the "Party" refer to 2020.

The artist is very jealous of the authorship of the idea of the "Party of the Dead" and has repeatedly stated publicly that it was she who inspired the members of the NBP to create their art project, and the artist Maxim Evstropov stole the idea of the party from her.

== "Party of the Dead" of Maxim Evstropov ==
=== History ===
The project appeared in 2017. It was created by members of the art group {rodina}, who became interested in the political situation in Russia and wanted to hold political events. According to the representative of the project, the "Party of the Dead" was created as a result of reflection on the action "Immortal Regiment", in which people participate with portraits of the dead - relatives who died during World War II. The representative sees this as "an attempt to appropriate the dead by the state and a militaristic ideology".

=== Description ===
From an ideological point of view, the participants in the project are anarchists. Political scientist and teacher at the Higher School of Economics Marina Sukhova believes that thanks to this, the participants “do not make sense to carry out political struggle in an institutional way, that is, to register a party and try to be elected to representative bodies.” In her opinion, the organization will most likely continue to exist as an art project, although in Western democracies such organizations sometimes enter into political activity, as happened, for example, with the German anarchist organization Bergpartei, die "ÜberPartei", which moved from artistic actions to participation in elections.

According to representatives, death is politicized in Russia - for example, the dead are on the voter lists, and the voice of the dead is the voice of radical equality.

=== Political actions ===
Representatives of the project traditionally take to the action, hiding their faces behind masks in the form of skulls. They maintain anonymity, which, according to their representative, "helps to remain more or less safe". Actions carried out by the project, thematic, related to hanging leaflets or holding single pickets with posters.

=== Necro May Day ===
On May 1, 2018, the project participants held the “Necro May Day” action, going to the May Day demonstration with a poster “9 stages of decomposition of the leader”, depicting the successive stages of grass germination through the portrait of Putin. One of the participants was detained and fined 150 thousand rubles. This action parodies the traditional May Day processions and is held annually.

=== Necro Zoo Picket ===
Ongoing promotion launched in August 2020. As it was stated on the party information resources: “Dead animals, fish and birds, especially birds, come to the aid of those who cannot. dead mice leave the festive parade pyramids, quietly crawl right under the feet of the majors, who think they won’t stumble […] now they too are dead, which means they are pregnant with the revolution”. The result of this action are photographs in which home-made banners are placed next to the corpses of animals.

=== Situational pickets ===
A number of pickets and actions carried out by the "Parties of the Dead" are situational in nature. For example, dedicated to violence against animals in the circus, raising the retirement age or changing the Constitution of the Russian Federation or the next elections.

In the autumn of 2018, a representative of the project went out to protest against the pension reform in Russia with a poster “Life is difficult, but, fortunately, short” and was fined 17 thousand rubles for an action that was not approved by the authorities.

In 2020, activists of the "Party of the Dead" held a "necropicket" at the cemetery in protest against amendments to the Russian Constitution, using the slogans "Yes, death! Yes, amendments!”, “For the Constitution – without clinking glasses” and “Amendments are like poultices to the dead”.

In November 2021, project participants picketed against the liquidation of the Memorial society with the slogan “We don’t remember, we don’t know, we can repeat”.

=== Anti-war actions ===
On 22 February 2022, after Putin recognized the DPR and LPR, activists of the Party of the Dead went to an anti-war protest at the Piskaryovskoye cemetery in Saint Petersburg with posters “The dead don’t need war”, “They don’t have enough corpses” and “Russian power will grow with graves” . According to the activists, they were afraid of the outbreak of war, and they chose such a place for the action because a month earlier, Putin laid a wreath there at the Motherland monument and the activists wanted to “expel him from there in order to return this cemetery to the dead”.

On March 7, 2022, the project participants held an action against the Russian invasion of Ukraine in one of the cemeteries of St. Petersburg, dedicated to the military losses of Russia, holding posters “We do not leave our own (only their corpses)”, “Mothers! Your children are fake” and “Russians don’t bury Russians”. The activists called their action a reaction to the fact that the Russian authorities value little the lives of citizens of Russia and other countries.

On May 9, 2022, the Party of the Dead held a large-scale international action dedicated to the traditional celebration of Victory Day.
