= Dukkepartiet =

Puppet Party Dukkepartiet
- Leader: Unspecified
- Founded: April 2014
- Headquarters: Copenhagen
- Ideology: Big tent
- Colors: Red, dark blue
- Folketing: 0 / 179
- Municipal councils: 0 / 2,444

Website
- Dukkepartiet.dk

The Puppet Party (Danish: Dukkepartiet) is a political protest party in Denmark. The party was formed in April 2014. It declared its mission as “to exhibit the emptiness and thereby restarting democracy.” The party members have taken part in protests in rubber masks, interrupting Parliament sessions.
