= Canadian Extreme Wrestling Party =

Frivolous political party in Canada

The Canadian Extreme Wrestling Party (CEWP) was a frivolous political party in Canada that was not registered as an official party by Elections Canada, the government agency that conducts the Canadian elections.

The party held its leadership convention in Conception Bay South, Newfoundland. This was the first leadership convention to be held in Newfoundland for any federal party in the history of confederation.

== History ==
The CEWP was founded on the back of the wrestler Jesse Ventura's 1998 victory in the Minnesota Gubernatorial race.

In the fall of 1999, a young professional wrestler named Quentin Barboni beat out 11 other wrestlers, including Mike "Bulldozer" Dror and Norman Tharx, in a Battle Royale to become the first leader of the Canadian Extreme Wrestling Party.

The organization formed a National Executive and a Canadian Extreme Wrestling Woman's Auxiliary. "Miss Marilyn" was the Woman's Auxiliary's Secretary.

Party officials held news conferences with reporters and conducted interviews with the media. The party issued over thirty pages of policy statements to the media. The policy of the party was decidedly left wing. Policy included: the issue of overfishing in Canadian waters, regional development, Canada withdrawing from the North Atlantic Treaty Organization (NATO) and becoming neutral, and a "Guaranteed Annual Income" for all Canadians.

According to author Vance Nevada, the party's policy was shaped by the existing policies of the Green Party, edited by future Green Party leadership contender Jason Crummey.

== 2000 St. John's West By-Election ==
In the April 2000 by-election in the federal riding of St. John's West, Newfoundland, "Sailor King Moondog White" — a former World Wrestling Federation (WWF) wrestler — stood as an independent candidate for the Canadian Extreme Wrestling Party. Ed Sailor White's campaign slogan was "Parliament needs a Moondog."

In an interview with the Newfoundland Herald, Sailor White stated:

"I know exactly what they want. What they don't need is gun control. We need the seal hunt. We should be able to get in our boats at any time; we've got the God-given right to go out and get a fish any time we want. When I get to Ottawa this is what I'm going to be fighting for. I'm going to represent Newfoundland to the best of my ability, I'm going to stand up for Newfoundland and I'm going to wear the Newfoundland flag."

Campaigning on a tiny budget and embarking on a mass canvassing approach, White would win over 300 votes or 1.1% of the vote.

The result was notable though as they polled just 3% behind the Official Opposition, the Reform Party of Canada.The Globe and Mail wrote: "Just think what a Newfie joke that would have been had the candidate of the Official Opposition been outpolled by the candidate for the Extreme Wrestling Party. As Wellington said of the Battle of Waterloo, it was a damn close-run thing — 1,317 votes for Mr. Hall to 328 for Sailor White.” Elsewhere, Progressive Conservative Party leader Joe Clark added: "If there was any proof needed, it’s crystal-clear tonight that this Reform party is a party that has no reach beyond Western Canada, nothing at all of national party. I guess if they want to form an alliance with anybody, they should take a close look at the Extreme Wrestling Party.”

Canada's Minister of Human Resources Development, Jane Stewart, mentioned the CEWP in Canada's House of Parliament in 2000. Lorne Nystrom (Member of Parliament for Regina—Qu'Appelle) also referred to the CEWP in the House of Commons. On May 12, 2000, a Member of the Nova Scotia House of Assembly mentioned the CEWP in Resolution 2006 in the Nova Scotia Hansard.

== See also ==
- Novelty candidate
- List of frivolous political parties
- List of political parties in Canada
