= The Canada Party =

- Leader: Chris Cannon and Brian Calvert
- Founded: 2012
- Headquarters: Vancouver, British Columbia
- Ideology: Satire and Politics
- Slogan: America, But Better

Website
- www.americabutbetter.com

The Canada Party is a political satire group devoted to electing Canada as President of the United States. Founded in Vancouver, British Columbia, in 2012, the organization produces and shares a variety of satirical media, including videos, posters, memes, and various campaign material. In 2012, they published the Canadian bestseller America, But Better.

== Critical reception ==
The Canada Party's inaugural video has received more than one million views and was described by George Stroumboulopoulos Tonight as "one of the top political ads of the 2012 election." Subsequent videos have tallied more than 80 million additional views.

The 2012 campaign was featured by outlets such as CNN, CBC, BBC, the Rush, and German State Television. C-SPAN produced a half-hour special on a campaign rally at the KGB Bar in New York City.

== Book ==
America, But Better: the Canada Party Manifesto was published in August, 2012 by Douglas & MacIntyre. The book was a Canadian bestseller, with Publishers Weekly claiming of the authors "their bite is on par with that of the Daily Show, Stephen Colbert, and Bill Maher."
