= Kolonaki =

Kolonaki Κολωνάκι
- Neighborhood
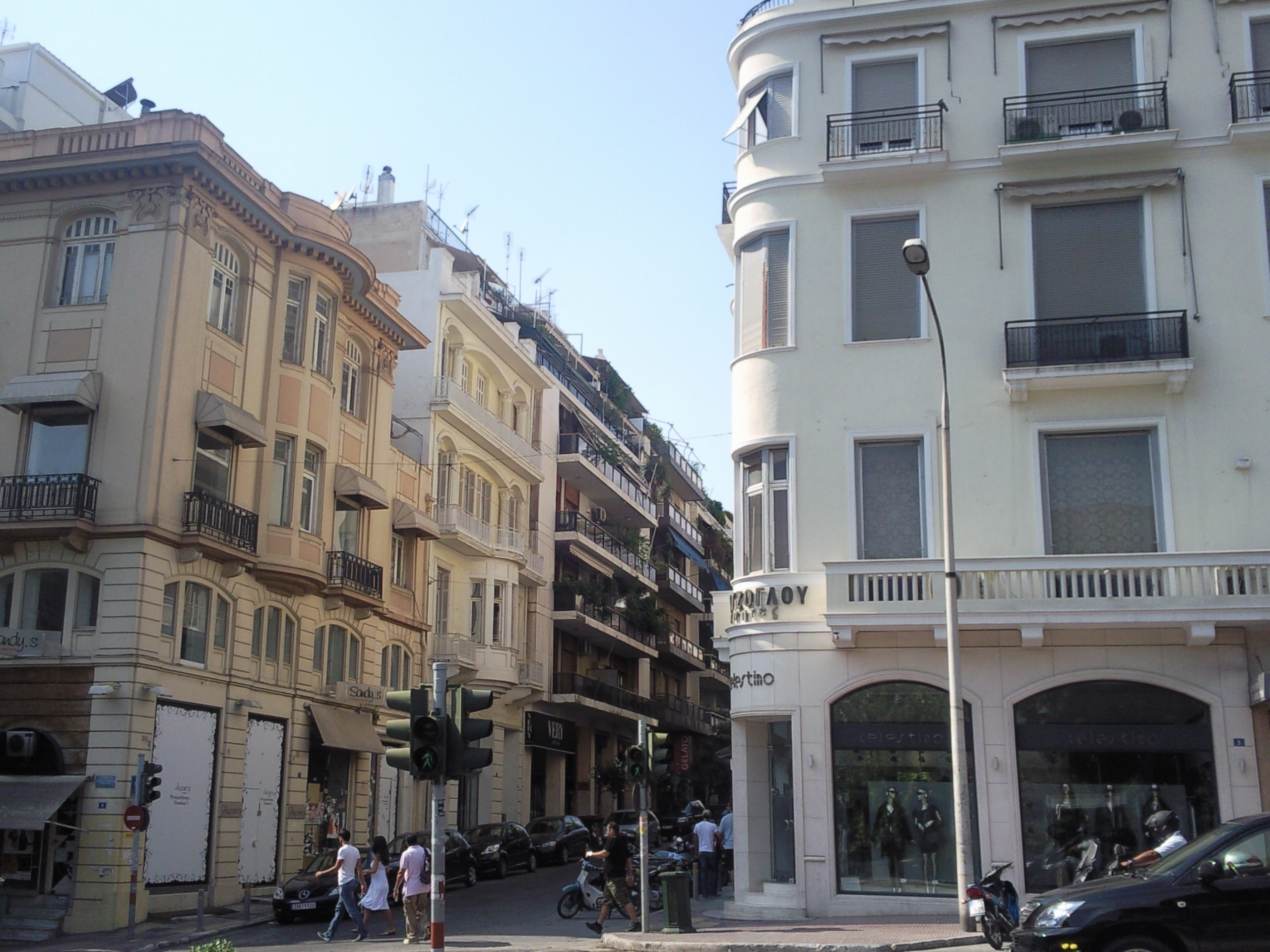

- Location in Athens
- Coordinates: 37°58′40″N 23°44′30″E
- Country: Greece
- Region: Attica
- City: Athens
- Postal code: 106 71, 106 72, 106 73, 106 74, 106 75, 106 76, 106 80, 115 21
- Website: www.cityofathens.gr

Kolonaki (Greek: Κολωνάκι, pronounced [koloˈnaci]), literally "Little Column", is an upscale neighborhood in central Athens, Greece. It is located on the southern slopes of Mount Lycabettus. Its name derives from the two metre column (located in Kolonaki Square) that defined the area even before the area's urbanization.

== Description ==
Museums and galleries include the Benaki Museum, inside a preserved neoclassical manor house, the Goulandris Museum of Cycladic Art and the National Gallery of Greece on Vasileos Konstantinou Avenue. Across the street from Vasilissis Sofias Avenue are the Byzantine and Christian Museum, and the War Museum of Athens.

Options for nightlife include bars, ouzeries, and tavernas. The neighbourhood is served by Evangelismos station on Line 3 of the Athens Metro.

== Politics ==
Kolonaki comprises the 42nd and 43rd precincts of Athens. The neighbourhood has traditionally been substantially more conservative than the rest of the municipality of Athens.

Parliamentary election results since 2000
6/2023	5/2023	2019	9/2015	1/2015	6/2012
1. ND 65.15%; 2. SYRIZA 11.40%; 3. PASOK 4.72%; 4. KKE 4.09%; 5. MERA25 3.37%; 6. Spartans 2.57%; 7. PE 2.07%; 8. Victory 1.95%; 9. EL 1.63%; 10. Others 3.05%	1. ND 63.16%; 2. SYRIZA 13.84%; 3. PASOK 5.40%; 4. KKE 4.29%; 5. MERA25 2.94%; 6. PE 2.22%; 7. EL 1.36%; 8. ED 1.35%; 9. Victory 1.12%; 10. Others 4.32%	1. ND 64.11%; 2. SYRIZA 18.65%; 3. PASOK 3.86%; 4. KKE 3.30%; 5. MERA25 3.29%; 6. XA 1.87%; 7. EL 1.48%; 8. Others 3.44%	1. ND 50.98%; 2. SYRIZA 19.14%; 3. River 9.65%; 4. XA 4.02%; 5. PASOK 3.36%; 6. KKE 2.81%; 7. LAE 2.75%; 8. EK 2.48%; 9. ANEL 2.28%; 10. Others 2.53%	1. ND 47.60%; 2. SYRIZA 20.27%; 3. River 11.59%; 4. XA 4.58%; 5. PASOK 3.56%; 6. ANEL 3.43%; 7. KKE 2.75%; 8. KIDISO 2.10%; 9. EK 1.22%; 10. Others 2.90%	1. ND 51.80%; 2. SYRIZA 14.85%; 3. PASOK 8.82%; 4. DIMAR 7.45%; 5. XA 4.51%; 6. DIXA 4.09%; 7. ANEL 3.58%; 8. KKE 1.97%; 9. LAOS 1.27%; 10. Others 1.66%
5/2012	2009	2007	2004	2000	
1. ND 23.75%; 2. Action 15.43%; 3. PASOK 11.78%; 4. SYRIZA 10.72%; 5. ANEL 5.62%; 6. DIMAR 5.43%; 7. XA 5.15%; 8. DISY 4.52%; 9. DIXA 4.31%; 10. KKE 3.64%; 11. OP 2.60%; 12. LAOS 2.50%; 13. ANTARSYA 1.03%; 14. Others 3.52%	1. ND 44.68%; 2. PASOK 26.61%; 3. SYRIZA 8.78%; 4. LAOS 6.29%; 5. OP 6.16%; 6. KKE 4.58%; 7. Others 2.90%	1. ND 54.34%; 2. PASOK 21.02%; 3. SYRIZA 9.43%; 4. KKE 5.73%; 5. LAOS 4.43%; 6. OP 3.19%; 7. Others 1.86%	1. ND 55.53%; 2. PASOK 28.27%; 3. SYRIZA 7.09%; 4. KKE 3.91%; 5. LAOS 2.65%; 6. DIKKI 1.45%; 7. Others 1.10%	1. ND 50.15%; 2. PASOK 36.78%; 3. Coalition 5.42%; 4. KKE 3.24%; 5. DIKKI 1.62%; 6. Others 2.79%	

European Parliament election results since 1999
2024	2019	2014	2009	2004	1999
1. ND 50.12%; 2. SYRIZA 9.49%; 3. PASOK 7.59%; 4. NA 5.13%; 5. KKE 3.97%; 6. MERA25 3.70%; 7. EL 3.40%; 8. Cosmos 3.21%; 9. FL 2.68%; 10. Democrats 2.60%; 11. PE 1.99%; 12. Victory 1.77%; 13. Participate 1.10%; 14. Others 3.25%	1. ND 57.83%; 2. SYRIZA 14.93%; 3. PASOK 5.11%; 4. River 3.58%; 5. MERA25 2.77%; 6. XA 2.63%; 7. KKE 2.22%; 8. PE 1.16%; 9. Others 9.77%	1. ND 44.07%; 2. SYRIZA 17.83%; 3. River 7.40%; 4. PASOK 7.23%; 5. XA 5.91%; 6. KKE 2.59%; 7. DIMAR 2.59%; 8. ANEL 2.33%; 9. DIXA–Action 2.16%; 10. LAOS 1.68%; 11. Others 6.21%	1. ND 41.81%; 2. PASOK 20.89%; 3. LAOS 8.19%; 4. SYRIZA 6.65%; 5. Action 6.46%; 6. OP 6.06%; 7. KKE 4.31%; 8. PAMME 1.50%; 9. Others 4.13%	1. ND 54.40%; 2. PASOK 20.60%; 3. Coalition 7.47%; 4. KKE 6.84%; 5. LAOS 5.04%; 6. Women 1.53%; 7. OP 1.19%; 8. Others 2.93%	1. ND 35.44%; 2. PASOK 28.85%; 3. Liberals 10.85%; 4. Coalition 6.75%; 5. KKE 5.18%; 6. POLAN 3.68%; 7. DIKKI 2.48%; 8. PG 1.42%; 9. Kollatos 1.15%; 10. Others 4.20%

== Gallery ==
Detail from "Plan d'Athènes" 1853. Origins of the name of Kolonaki shown, with the location of the Column (Colonne) now in Kolonaki Square

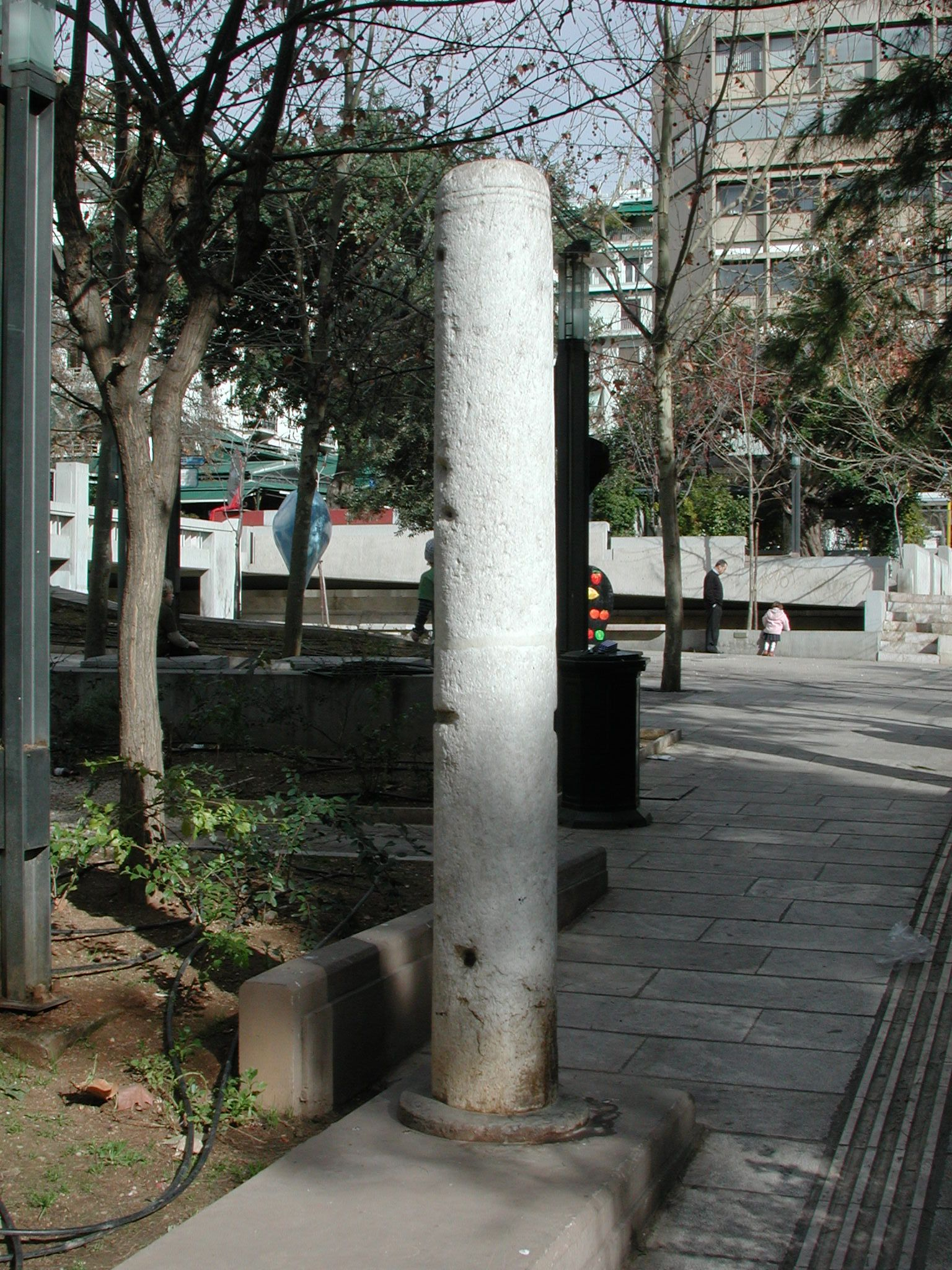
The little column in Kolonaki Square

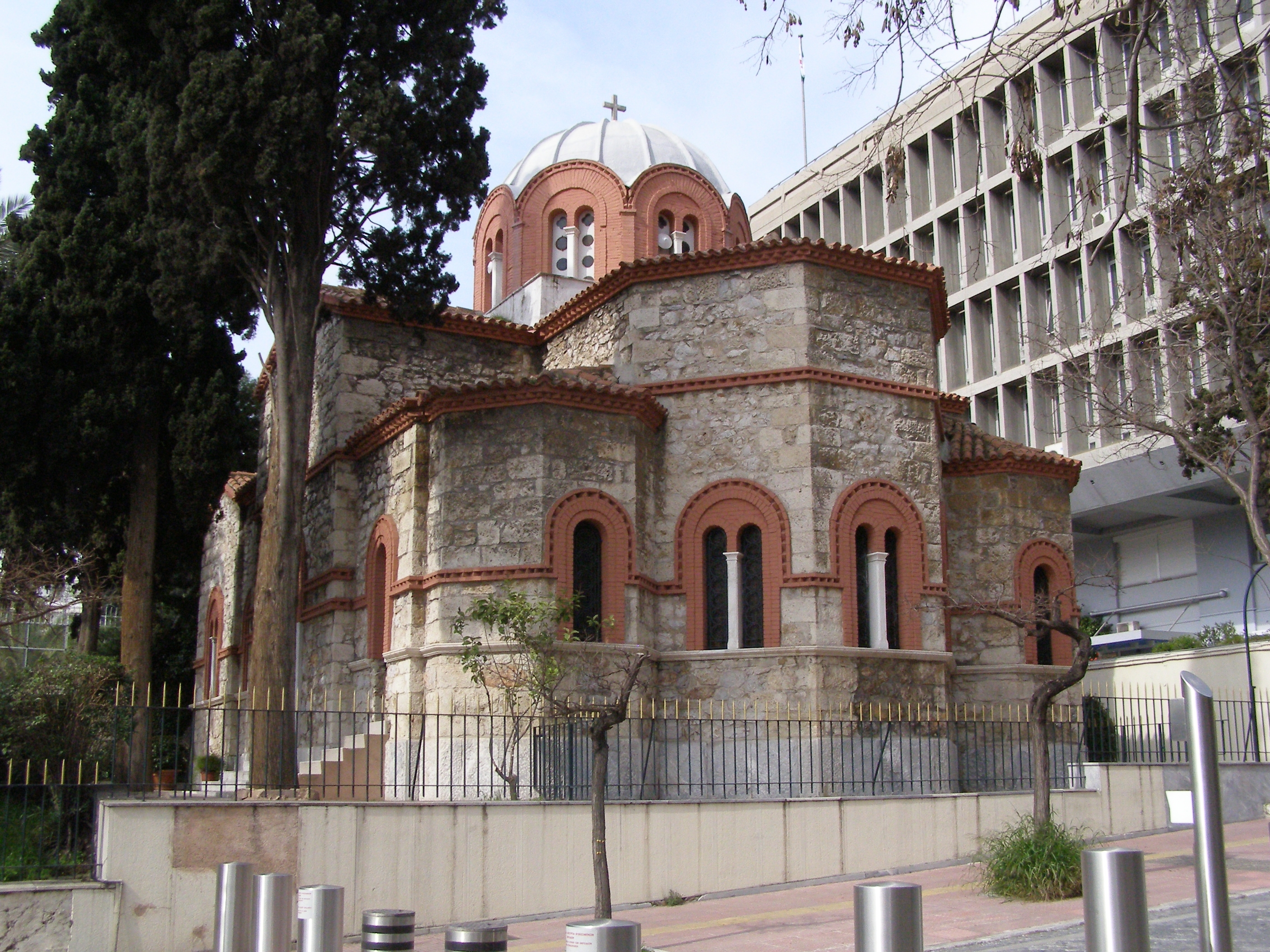
St. Nicholas church

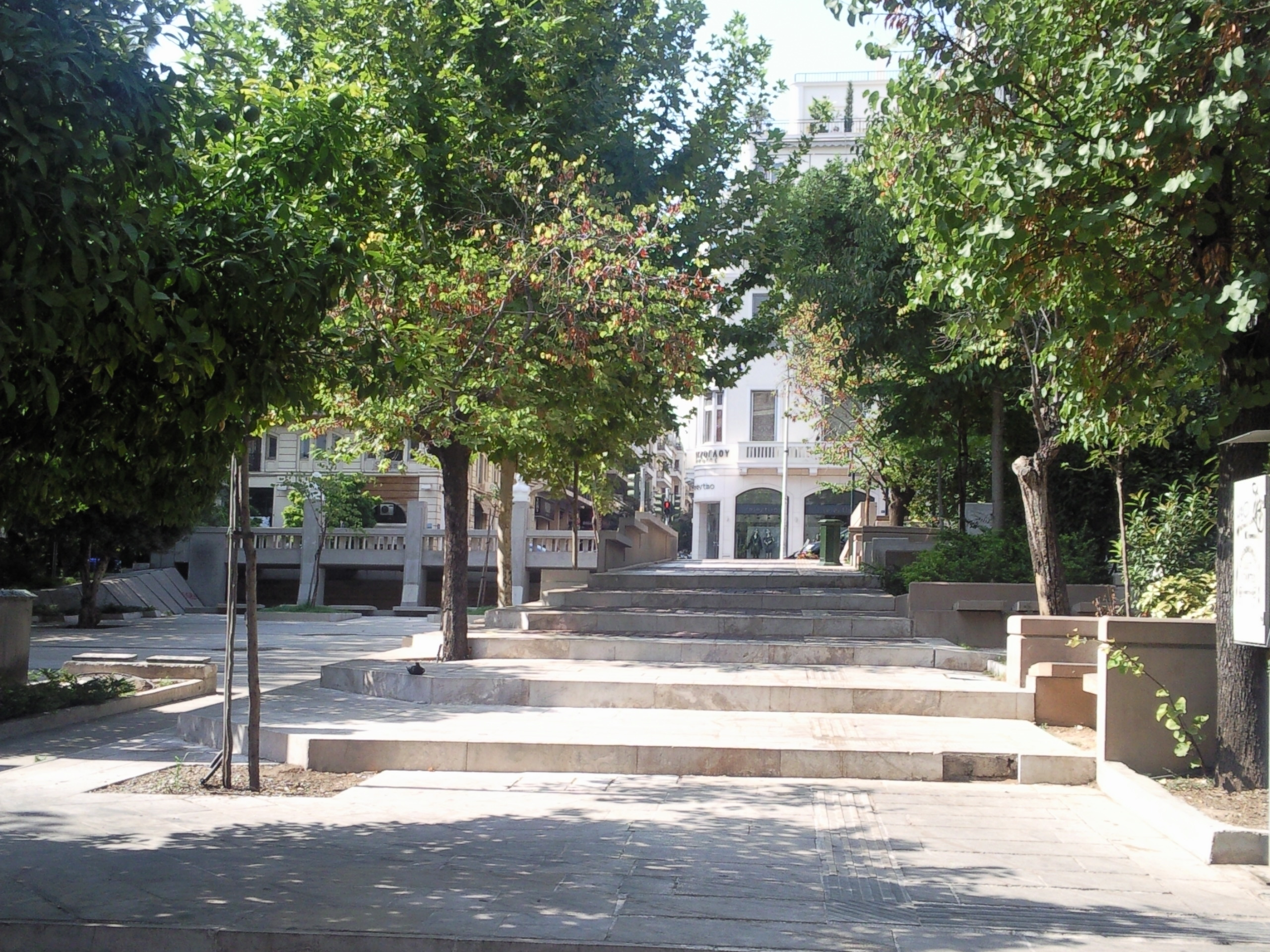
View of Kolonaki Square

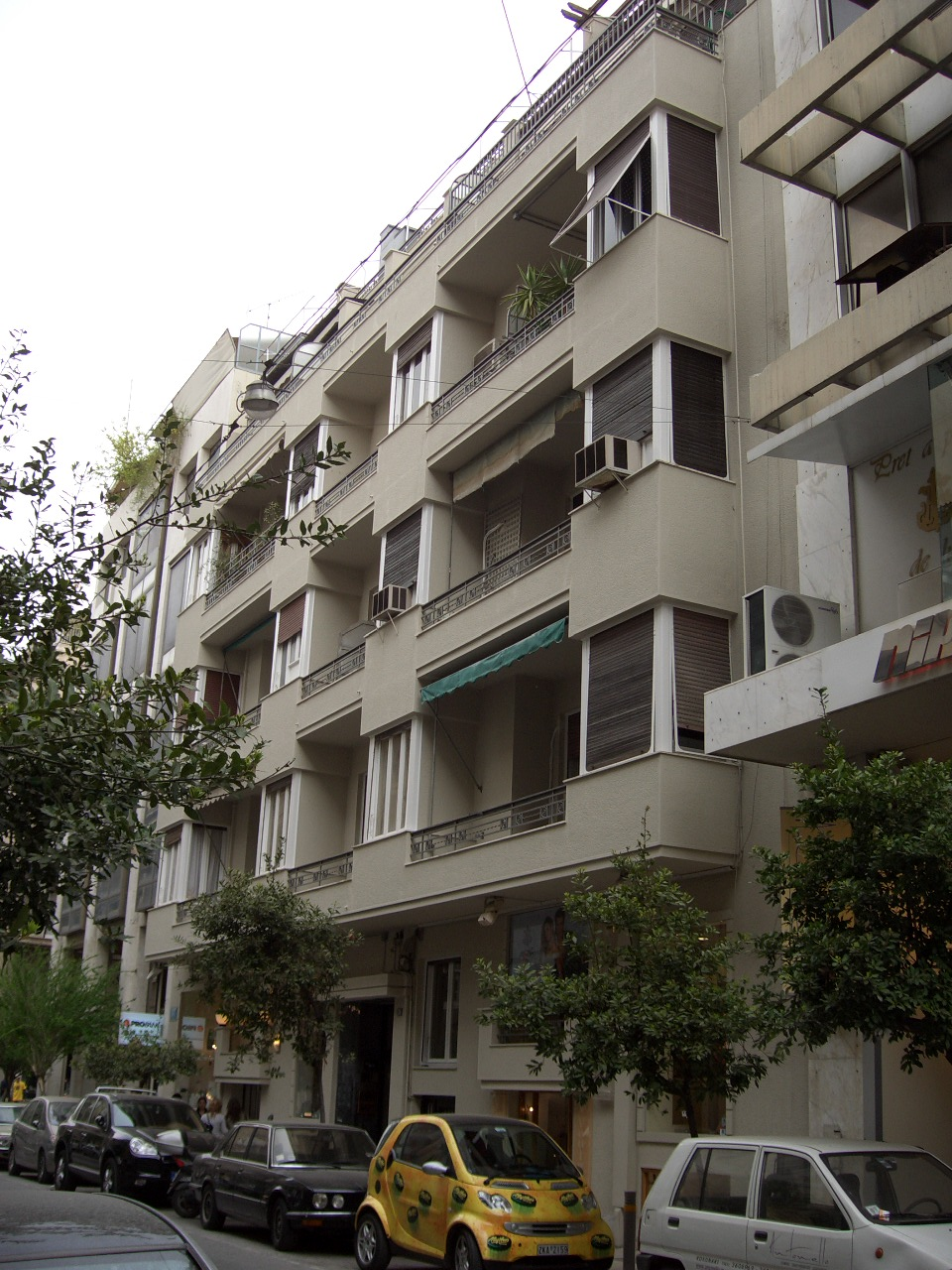
Early modern buildings

== Notable people ==
- Loula Anagnostaki (1928–2017), playwright
- King Constantine II
- Konstantinos Karamanlis
- Miranda Xafa
