= Greek government-debt crisis timeline =

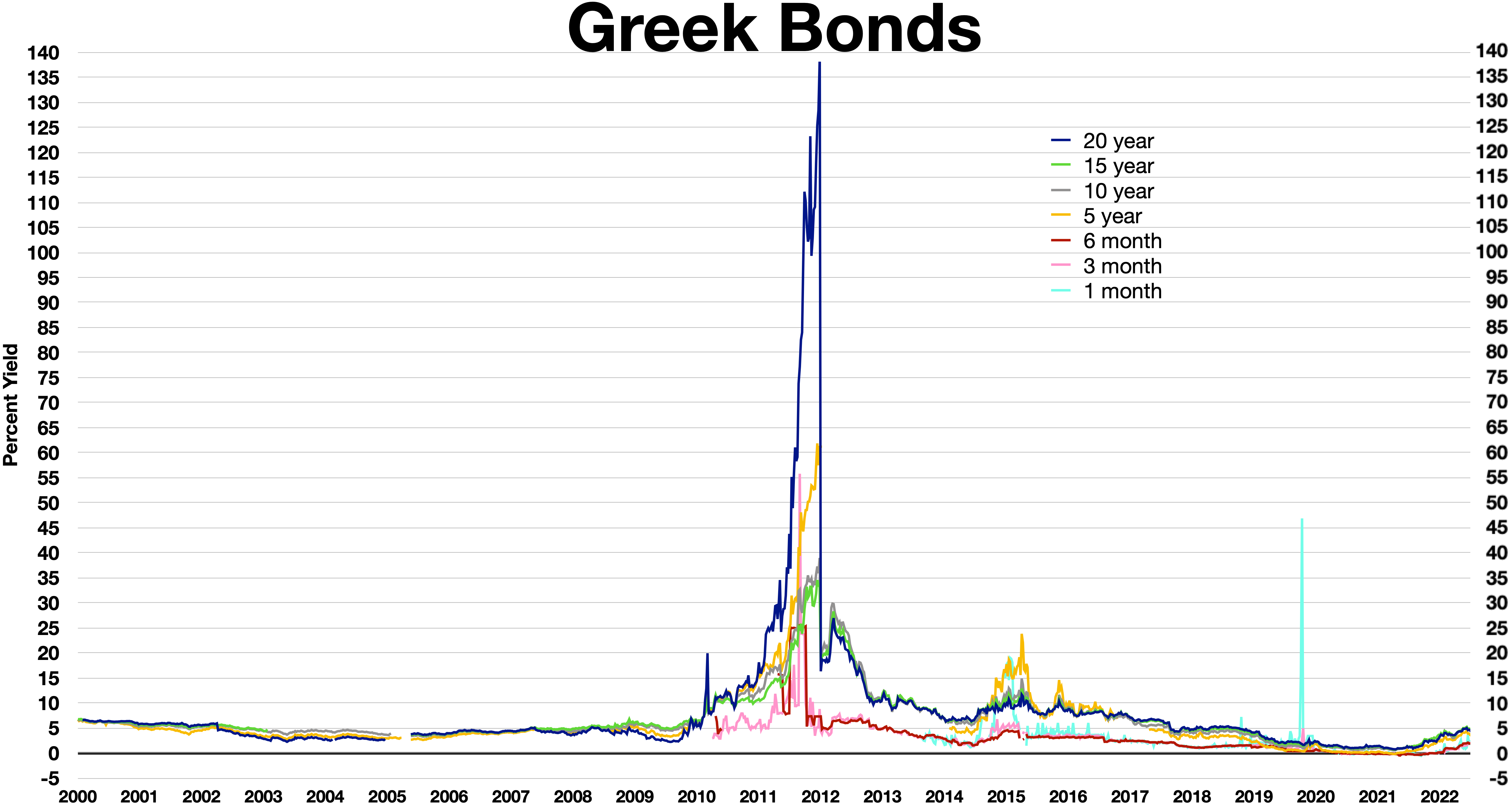
Greek bonds 20 year 15 year 10 year 5 year 1 year 3 month 1 month

The Greek government-debt crisis began in 2009 and ended in 2018. During this period, many changes had occurred in Greece. The income of many Greeks has declined, levels of unemployment have increased, elections and resignations of politicians have altered the country's political landscape radically, the Greek parliament has passed many austerity bills, and protests have become common sights throughout the country.

== Background ==
Cabinets of Greek Debt Crisis

Greece joined the European Communities (subsequently subsumed by the European Union) on 1 January 1981, ushering in a period of sustained growth. Widespread investments in industrial enterprises and heavy infrastructure, as well as funds from the European Union and growing revenues from tourism, shipping and a fast-growing service sector raised the country's standard of living to unprecedented levels. The country adopted the Euro in 2001 and over the next 7 years the country's GDP per capita more than doubled, from $13,070 in 2001 to $28,660 in 2008. The Greek government, encouraged by the European Commission, European Central Bank, private banking institutions, and the Greek business community also took out loans to pay Greek and foreign infrastructure companies for a wide variety of infrastructure projects such as those related to the 2004 Summer Olympic Games in Athens. Government deficits were also consistently underreported. As the 2008 financial crisis began to affect Greece's economy, the country's GDP stagnated between 2008 and 2010 and the government's capacity to repay its creditors was drastically reduced.

== 2009 ==
=== Political events ===
- 4 October 2009 – The centre-left PASOK wins the Greek legislative elections. The party received 43.92% of the popular vote and 160 of 300 parliamentary seats.

=== Financial events ===
- 20 October 2009 – Greece's budget deficit is expected to reach ~12.5% of GDP, according to disclosure by George Papaconstantinou, finance minister in Greece's new PASOK government (Cabinet of George Papandreou). This deficit exceeds a threshold of 3% of GDP which was set in the Stability and Growth Pact for all eurozone member states.
- 22 October 2009 – Greece's credit rating is downgraded by Fitch, one of the Big Three credit ratings agencies, from A to A−.
- 8 December 2009 – Greece's credit rating is downgraded by Fitch from A− to BBB+.
- 16 December 2009 – Greece's credit rating is downgraded by Standard and Poor's, another of the Big Three credit ratings agencies.
- 23 December 2009 – Greece's credit rating is downgraded by Moody's, the third of the Big Three credit ratings agencies, from A1 to A2.

== 2010 ==
=== Political events ===
- 9 February 2010 – The First austerity package is passed by the Greek parliament. Measures include: a freeze in the salaries of all government employees, a 10% cut in bonuses, and cuts in overtime workers.
- 3 March 2010 – The Second austerity package is passed by the Greek parliament. Measures include: a freeze in pensions; an increase in VAT from 19% to 21%; rises in taxes on fuel, cigarettes, and alcohol; rises in taxes on luxury goods; and cuts in public sector pay.
- 23 April 2010 – Prime Minister George Papandreou formally requests an international bailout for Greece. The European Union (EU), European Central Bank (ECB) and International Monetary Fund (IMF) agree to participate in the bailout.
- 2 May 2010 – The IMF, Greek Prime Minister Papandreou, and other eurozone leaders agree to the First bailout package for €110 billion ($143 billion) over 3 years. The Third austerity package is announced by the Greek government.
- 5 May 2010 – Greece-wide riots and popular revolt break out as Greece turns violent. There is a 48-hour nationwide strike and demonstrations in two major cities. Three people are killed when a group of masked people throw petrol bombs in a Marfin Egnatia Bank branch on Stadiou street.
- 6 May 2010 – The Third austerity package is passed by the Greek parliament.
- 7 July 2010 – The Greek parliament passes pension reform, a key requirement of the EU and IMF. Measures include: increasing retirement age from 60 to 65 for women. The reforms cut prospective payments from 25% of GDP by 2050. Additional pension reforms come in November 2012.
- 15 December 2010 – The Greek parliament passes a new law regarding state-owned companies. The law sets a cap on monthly wages and introduces 10% cuts on salaries above €1,800.
- 23 December 2010 – The Greek parliament approves the 2011 austerity budget.

=== Financial events ===
- 21 January 2010 – The Greek/German 10-year debt yield spread surpasses 300 basis points (the interest rate in Greece was 3% above that in Germany).
- 9 April 2010 – Greece's credit rating is downgraded by Fitch from BBB+ to BBB−.
- 22 April 2010 – Greece's credit rating is downgraded by Moody's from A2 to A3.
- 27 April 2010 – Greece's credit rating is downgraded by Standard & Poor's below investment grade to junk bond status. Standard & Poor's is the last of the Big Three credit ratings agencies to downgrade Greece's credit rating in April 2010.
- 28 April 2010 – The Greek/German 10-year debt yield spread surpasses 1000 basis points (the interest rate in Greece was 10% above that in Germany).
- 14 June 2010 – Greece's credit rating is downgraded by Moody's from A3 to Ba1. The downgrade follows a previous downgrade on 27 April 2010.

== 2011 ==
=== Political events ===
- 25 May 2011 – The Greek Indignant Citizens Movement (also known as the Square Movement) starts daily protests. It is inspired by a similar movement in Spain.
- 17 June 2011 – The prime minister makes a broad cabinet reshuffle and Evangelos Venizelos assumes the position of finance minister.
- 29 June 2011 – The Fourth austerity package is passed by the Greek parliament despite protests outside the parliament building. The two-day demonstrations against the bill turn violent as protesters clash with police in front of the Greek parliament and other areas of central Athens. The measures in the austerity package include new taxes and new cuts of workers' wages.
- 11 September 2011 – The Greek parliament imposes a new property tax to be collected through the electricity bill.
- 20 October 2011 – The Fifth austerity package is passed by the Greek parliament, amid protests and violent rioting outside the parliament building.
- 27 October 2011 – The investors agree to a "haircut" of 50% in converting their existing bonds into new loans.
- 28 October 2011 – An anti-austerity protest in Thessaloniki forces the cancellation of a commemoration parade for a national holiday. Similar incidents occur in several other Greek cities.
- 31 October 2011 – Greek Prime Minister Papandreou calls for a confidence vote and a referendum to approve the EU summit deal from the previous week regarding the Greek debt haircut.
- 4 November 2011 – Papandreou wins the confidence vote 153–145.
- 6 November 2011 – Prime Minister Papandreou resigns.
- 10 November 2011 – Lucas Papademos becomes the new Greek Prime Minister, as the leader of a coalition government consisting of the PASOK, New Democracy, and LAOS parties.

=== Financial events ===
- 14 January 2011 – Greece's credit rating is downgraded by Fitch from BBB− to BB+.
- 7 March 2011 – Greece's credit rating is downgraded by Moody's from Ba1 to B1.
- 29 March 2011 – Greece's credit rating is downgraded by Standard and Poor's to BB−.
- 9 May 2011 – Greece's credit rating is downgraded by Standard and Poor's from BB− to B.
- 20 May 2011 – Greece's credit rating is downgraded by Fitch from BB+ to B+.
- 1 June 2011 – Greece's credit rating is downgraded by Moody's from B1 to Caa1.
- 13 June 2011 – Greece's credit rating is downgraded by Standard and Poor's to its lowest rating.
- 13 July 2011 – Greece's credit rating is downgraded by Fitch from B+ to CCC.
- 25 July 2011 – Greece's credit rating is downgraded by Moody's to Ca−.
- 27 July 2011 – Greece's credit rating is downgraded by Standard and Poor's from CCC to CC.
- 8 August 2011 – The Athens Stock Exchange general index falls below 1000 points, its lowest level since January 1997.
- December 2011 – Greece's private TV channel Alter stops broadcasting due to financial difficulties.

== 2012 ==
=== Political events ===
- 12 February 2012 – The Sixth austerity package is passed by the Greek parliament amid violent protests. Many buildings in the centre of Athens are burned during the riots.
- 21 February 2012 – The Second bailout package is finalized. It brings the total amount of eurozone and IMF bailouts to €246 billion by 2016, which is 135% of Greece's GDP in 2013.
- 4 April 2012 – A retired pharmacist commits suicide a short distance from Greece's parliament as an act of protest against austerity. He becomes a symbol for groups opposing the austerity measures, and violent clashes between police and demonstrators erupt in Athens.
- 6 May 2012 – Elections are held. The New Democracy party wins, but with a smaller share of the popular vote and fewer seats than it had in the previous election. The governing PASOK party collapses, while more votes go to the left wing parties (Syriza, KKE, and DIMAR) and right wing parties (ANEL, XA). No party wins the majority of the parliament seats.
- 16 May 2012 – No coalition government is able to be formed, so Panagiotis Pikramenos assumes the position of caretaker Prime Minister. An early election is called for 17 June.
- 17 June 2012 – Early elections are held. The New Democracy party leads, winning 29.7% of the popular vote, but doesn't win a majority of seats in parliament. Four days later, a coalition government is formed between New Democracy, PASOK and DIMAR. Antonis Samaras, the president of New Democracy, becomes the new Prime Minister.
- 7 November 2012 – The Seventh austerity package is adopted by the Greek parliament. The austerity measures are required for Greece to receive the next installment, the second economic bailout, worth €31.5 billion. Protests occur outside the parliament. Austerity measures include: public pension cuts on average between 5% and 15% through the removal of two seasonal bonuses; an increase of the retirement age from 65 to 67; additional wage cuts for civil servants up to 20%; and public salary wage cuts up to 30%.
- 11 November 2012 – The Greek parliament passes the 2013 austerity budget.

=== Financial events ===
- 9 March 2012 – Greek 10-year bond yields reach a peak of 44.21% on the eve of debt restructuring. 83.5% of Greek bondholders are in the private sector.
- 25 May 2012 – The Athens Stock Exchange general index falls below 500 points.

== 2013 ==
=== Political events ===
- 28 April 2013 – The Greek parliament approves a reform bill: it abolishes 15,000 state jobs by the end of 2014, including 4,000 in 2013; makes it easier to fire civil servants; increases the working hours of teachers; and cuts a property tax by 15%.
- 11 June 2013 – The Greek parliament shuts down the country's Public Broadcasting Service ERT.
- 21 June 2013 – The Democratic Left party withdraws from the Greek coalition government, which retains a razor-thin majority in parliament.
- 24 June 2013 – Prime Minister Samaras reshuffles his cabinet.
- 17 July 2013 – A new reform bill is passed by the Greek parliament. Measures include a contentious plan for thousands of layoffs and wage cuts for civil service workers.
- 21 December 2013 – A bill on the Single Property Tax and the auction of houses is approved by a majority of 152 deputies in the 300-seat chamber.

=== Financial events ===
- 30 November 2013 – Greece's credit rating is upgraded by Moody's to Caa3 from C.

== 2014 ==
=== Political events ===
- 30 March 2014 – The Greek parliament passes a new multi-bill which is needed for Greece to receive its next bailout payment. Nikitas Kaklamanis, a member of parliament, is expelled from the government for abstaining from the vote on one of the bill's two articles, leaving the government with an even smaller majority.
- 9 May 2014 – The Greek Parliament approves the Medium-term Fiscal Strategy plan 2015-2018
- 18 May 2014 – Local elections are held.
- 25 May 2014 – Syriza wins the European Parliament election.
- 9 June 2014 – The cabinet is reshuffled. Gikas Hardouvelis assumes the position of finance minister.
- 8 December 2014 – Parliament begins attempts to elect a new president to replace outgoing Karolos Papoulias, whose five-year presidential term was due to end in February. The next day the Athens Stock Exchange falls 12.78%, its largest single-day decline since 1989.
- 29 December 2014 – The government's candidate for the president (a largely ceremonial role), Stavros Dimas, fails to win majority support from parliament, and the government falls. This leads to snap parliamentary elections, which are set to be held on 25 January 2015.

=== Financial events ===
- 14 Jan 2014 – Greece posts a primary budget surplus of 1.5% of GDP for the 2013 financial year (€691 million).
- 10 April 2014 – Greece returns to financial markets with the issue of €3 billion Eurobonds at a yield below 6%.
- 23 May 2014 – Greece's credit rating is upgraded by Fitch from B− to B.

== 2015 ==
=== Political events ===
- 25 January 2015 – The Greek legislative election is held. Syriza wins a historic victory.
- 26 January 2015 – Syriza and the Independent Greeks join to form a new coalition government. Alexis Tsipras is sworn in as the new Prime Minister. Yanis Varoufakis becomes the new finance minister.
- 20 February 2015 – The Eurogroup brokers an agreement between Greece and the eurozone for a four-month loan extension.
- 27 June 2015 – Prime Minister Tsipras announces a referendum on a bailout agreement, to be held on 5 July 2015.
- 28 June 2015 – The Greek parliament approves the referendum, with 178 votes for and 120 against.
- 5 July 2015 – The Greek bailout referendum is held. Over 61% vote against the proposed measures by the Juncker Commission, the ECB and the IMF. Antonis Samaras resigns as leader of New Democracy and is succeeded by acting leader Vangelis Meimarakis
- 6 July 2015 – Minister of Finance Varoufakis resigns and is replaced by Euclid Tsakalotos.
- 11 July 2015 – The Greek parliament approves the government proposal about bailout plan. 251 MPs vote for the proposal but 17 MPs of government coalition do not support.
- 13 July 2015 – Greece and Europeans creditors strike deal for 86 billion euros bailout over three years, though it must be approved by the parliaments of all of the Eurozone member states.
- 16 July 2015 – The Greek Parliament approves the first round of measures ("prior actions") required by the creditors, including changes to pensions and taxes, by 229 to 64 despite 21% of Syriza MPs voting against, and some violent protests.
- 17 July 2015 – The cabinet is reshuffled. The left wing deputies who revolted against the new bailout agreement are sacked from government. German parliament approves the start of negotiations for the third bailout programme for Greece.
- 23 July 2015 – The Greek parliament approves the second set of bailout measures.
- 27 July 2015 – An interview involving former finance minister Varoufakis is released, with revelations about a previously secret "plan B."
- 14 August 2015 – The Greek parliament approves the package of measures for the third bailout package. 222 MPs voted for the agreement, 64 against and another 14 abstained or were absent. 32 Syriza MPs voted against and another 11 abstained.
- 20 August 2015 – The prime minister Alexis Tsipras resigns and proclaims elections for 20 September.
- 27 August 2015 – Vassiliki Thanou was sworn as caretaker prime minister until 20 September election.
- 20 September 2015 – The Greek legislative election is held. Syriza wins with 7.5 point over New Democracy.
- 23 September 2015 – The new government is sworn in. Tsakalotos is reappointed as Minister of Finance.
- 19 November 2015 – The government passes a new austerity package. Two deputies of the government's coalition vote against the measures and they were expelled. The new majority consists of 153 deputies.

=== Financial events ===
- 4 February 2015 – The ECB decides not to accept the junk-rated collateral offered by Greek banks in return for regular financing, leaving them dependent on emergency liquidity assistance, ELA.
- 4 June 2015 – Greece asks the IMF to postpone the installment due on 5 June until the end of the month.
- 28 June 2015 – Tsipras announces that Greek banks will remain closed for a while; he also announces the imposition of capital controls (€60/day withdrawal limit; most foreign transfers banned).
- 30 June 2015 – Greece misses a payment on an IMF loan and falls into arrears. (Missed payments to the IMF are not considered formal defaults by the major credit rating agencies.) The payment was made with a 20-day delay.
- 1–3 July 2015 – 1,000 bank branches open to allow pensioners to withdraw €120 for the week. The move was made to accommodate the many pensioners who lack a bank card.
- 6 July 2015 – Greece extends its bank holiday and capital controls through 8 July.
- 20 July 2015 – Greek banks open again, but capital controls remain. The Greek government repays two loans to the IMF and ECB.
- 3 August 2015 – The Greek Stock Exchange reopened after being closed since 25 June and fell more than 16% with bank stocks losing an average of 30% in a single day's trading.
- 24 August 2015 – The Chinese stock market crash affects Greece. The Greek Stock Exchange fell 10.54%

== 2016 ==
=== Political events ===
- 4 February 2016 – The major general strike takes place amid lasting demonstrations of farmers.
- 8 May 2016 – A new austerity package (the thirteenth one) to the tune of 5.4 billion euros is passed by the Greek parliament.
- 22 May 2016 – The additional taxes measures is passed by 153 for and 145 against. Syriza MPs Katrivanou resigns, following her vote against two of the articles.

=== Financial events ===
- 22 January 2016 – Greece's credit rating is upgraded by Standard and Poor's to B−
- 8 February 2016 – The Athens Stock Exchange general index falls below 500 units for the second time after June 2012.
- 24 June 2016 – Brexit affects the Greek Stock Market. The general index falls 13.42%

== 2017 ==
=== Political events ===
- 19 May 2017 – The Medium-term Fiscal Strategy Framework 2018–2021, introducing amendments of the provisions of the thirteenth austerity package, is passed by the Greek parliament.

== 2018 ==
=== Financial events ===
On June 21, 2018, Greece's creditors agreed on a 10-year extension of maturities on 96.6 billion euros of loans (i.e., almost a third of Greece's total debt), as well as a 10-year grace period in interest and amortization payments on the same loans. Greece successfully exited (as declared) the bailouts on August 20, 2018.

== Recovery after the end of the crisis ==
Greece has been repaying parts of its loans to EU creditors ahead of schedule, while having fully repaid its loans to the International Monetary Fund two years ahead of schedule in 2022. The early debt repayments were seen as part of the country's remarkable recovery following the end of the crisis in 2018, further evidenced by dramatically reduced borrowing costs for the country, with its benchmark 10-year government bond yields falling below Italy's on November 8, 2019 and France's on November 29, 2024.

== Government budget balance and debt ==
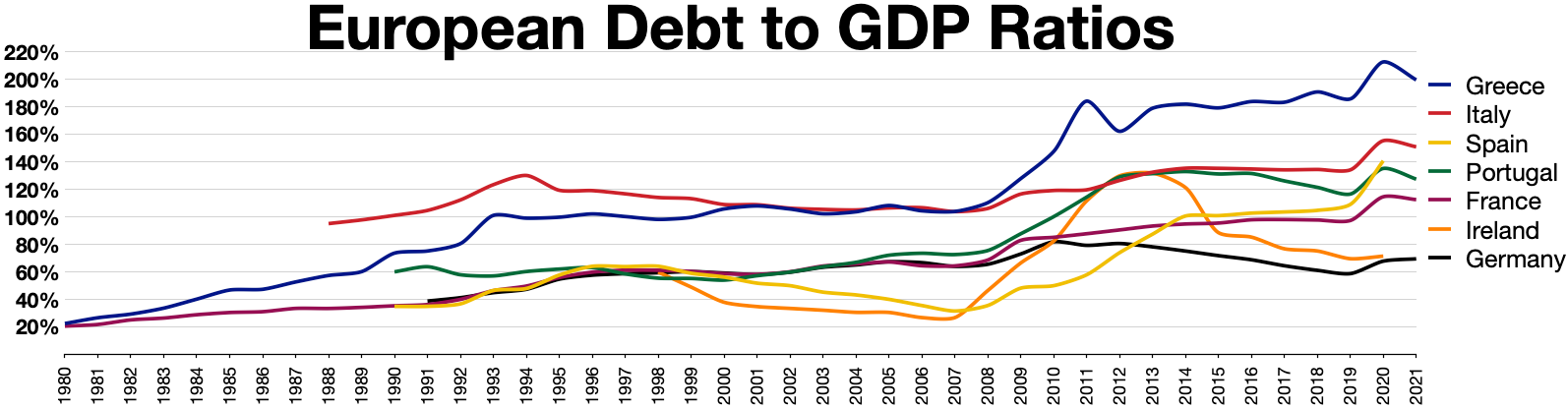
European debt to GDP ratios Greece Italy Spain Portugal France Ireland Germany

| Year | Deficit as a % of GDP Source: Eurostat | Debt as a % of GDP Source: Eurostat |
|---|---|---|
| 2008 | −9.8 | 112.9 |
| 2009 | −15.7 | 129.7 |
| 2010 | −10.9 | 148.3 |
| 2011 | −10.2 | 171.3 |
| 2012 | −8.7 | 156.9 |
| 2013 | −12.3 | 175.0 |
| 2014 | −3.6 | 178.9 |
| 2015 | −5.7 | 176.8 |
| 2016 | +0.6 | 180.8 |
| 2017 | +0.8 | 178.6 |

== Annual GDP growth rate ==
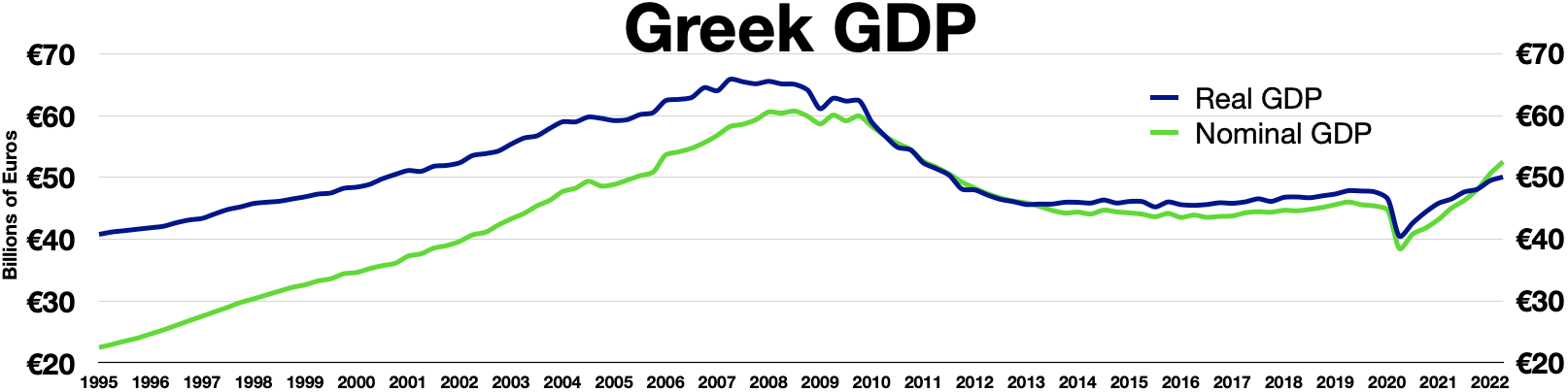
Greek GDP Real GDP (chained 2010 Euros) Nominal GDP

| year | rate Source: Eurostat |
|---|---|
| 2008 | −0.3 |
| 2009 | −4.3 |
| 2010 | −5.5 |
| 2011 | −9.1 |
| 2012 | −7.3 |
| 2013 | −3.2 |
| 2014 | 0.7 |
| 2015 | −0.3 |
| 2016 | −0.2 |

== Quarterly GDP growth rate (year-on-year) (seasonally and calendar adjusted figures) ==
| quarter | rate Source: EL.STAT. Source: Eurostat |
|---|---|
| 2008 Q1 | 1.8 |
| 2008 Q2 | −1.2 |
| 2008 Q3 | −0.3 |
| 2008 Q4 | −1.4 |
| 2009 Q1 | −7.1 |
| 2009 Q2 | −3.9 |
| 2009 Q3 | −4.1 |
| 2009 Q4 | −2.3 |
| 2010 Q1 | 0.5 |
| 2010 Q2 | −4.8 |
| 2010 Q3 | −7.6 |
| 2010 Q4 | −9.5 |

| quarter | rate Source: EL.STAT. Source: Eurostat |
|---|---|
| 2011 Q1 | −10.7 |
| 2011 Q2 | −8.6 |
| 2011 Q3 | −6.6 |
| 2011 Q4 | −10.7 |
| 2012 Q1 | −8.8 |
| 2012 Q2 | −8.6 |
| 2012 Q3 | −7.3 |
| 2012 Q4 | −4.3 |
| 2013 Q1 | −6.0 |
| 2013 Q2 | −3.6 |
| 2013 Q3 | −1.0 |
| 2013 Q4 | −2.5 |

| quarter | rate Source: EL.STAT. Source: Eurostat |
|---|---|
| 2014 Q1 | 0.0 |
| 2014 Q2 | 0.4 |
| 2014 Q3 | 1.6 |
| 2014 Q4 | 0.6 |
| 2015 Q1 | 0.3 |
| 2015 Q2 | 1.3 |
| 2015 Q3 | −0.1 |

== Unemployment ==
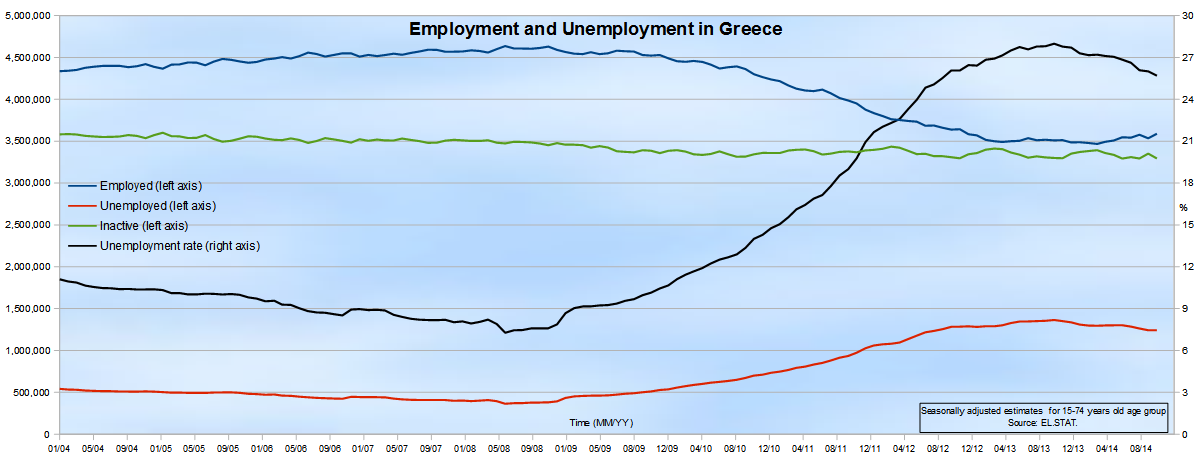
Employment and unemployment in Greece, 2004–2014

| quarter | rate Source: EL.STAT. | rate Source: Eurostat |
|---|---|---|
| 2010 Q1 | 11.9 | 11.4 |
| 2010 Q2 | 12.0 | 12.2 |
| 2010 Q3 | 12.6 | 13.0 |
| 2010 Q4 | 14.4 | 14.3 |
| 2011 Q1 | 16.1 | 15.3 |
| 2011 Q2 | 16.5 | 16.7 |
| 2011 Q3 | 17.9 | 18.2 |
| 2011 Q4 | 20.9 | 20.9 |
| 2012 Q1 | 22.8 | 21.9 |
| 2012 Q2 | 23.8 | 23.9 |
| 2012 Q3 | 24.9 | 25.5 |
| 2012 Q4 | 26.2 | 26.3 |
| 2013 Q1 | 27.6 | 27.0 |
| 2013 Q2 | 27.3 | 27.6 |
| 2013 Q3 | 27.2 | 27.8 |
| 2013 Q4 | 27.8 | 27.6 |
| 2014 Q1 | 27.8 | 27.2 |
| 2014 Q2 | 26.6 | 26.9 |
| 2014 Q3 | 25.5 | 26.2 |
| 2014 Q4 | 26.1 | 26.0 |
| 2015 Q1 | 26.6 | 25.9 |

== Elections ==
| Political position/ Ideology | Political Party | 2009 Legislative Elections | 2012 May Legislative Elections | 2012 June Legislative Elections | 2014 European Elections | 2015 January Legislative Elections | 2015 September Legislative Elections |
|---|---|---|---|---|---|---|---|
| Political position/ Ideology | Political Party | % (votes) | % (votes) | % (votes) | % (votes) | % (votes) | % (votes) |
| Far-Left | Communist Party of Greece | 7.54 (517,154) | 8.48 ▲ (536,105) | 4.50 ▼ (277,227) | 6.11 ▲ (349,255) | 5.47 ▼ (338,138) | 5.55 ▲ (301.615) |
| Far-Left | ANTARSYA | 0.36 (24,737) | 1.19 ▲ (75,416) | 0.33▼ (20,416) | 0.72▲ (41,307) | 0.64 ▼ (39,460) | 0.85 ▲ (46.096) |
| Left-Wing | Coalition of the Radical Left (Syriza) | 4.60 (315,627) | 16.79▲ (1,061,928) | 26.89▲ (1,655,022) | 26.57▼ (1,518,608) | 36.34▲ (2,246,064) | 35.46▼ (1.925.904) |
| Left-Wing | Popular Unity | — | — | — | — | — | 2.86 (155.242) |
| Centre-Left | PASOK/Olive Tree/Socialist Alignment | 43.92 (3,012,373) | 13.18▼ (833,452) | 12.28▼ (756,024) | 8.02▼ (458,403) | 4.68▼ (289,482) | 6.28 ▲ (341.390) |
| Centre-Left | Democratic Left | — | 6.11 (386,394) | 6.25▲ (384,986) | 1.20▼ (68.873) | 0.49▼ (30,074) | — |
| Centre-Left | Social Agreement | — | 0.96 (60,552) | — | — | — | — |
| Centre-Left | The River | — | — | — | 6.60 (377,438) | 6.05▼ (373,868) | 4.09▼ (222.166) |
| Centre-Left | Movement of Democratic Socialists | — | — | — | — | 2.46 (152,230) | — |
| Ecologist | Ecologist Greens | 2.53 (173,449) | 2.93 ▲ (185,485) | 0.88▼ (54,408) | 0.90▲ (51.673) | — | — |
| Centre | Union of Centrists | 0.27 (18,278) | 0.61▲ (38,376) | 0.28▼ (17,191) | 0.65▲ (36,879) | 1.79▲ (110,827) | 3.43▲ (186.457 ) |
| Centre | Teleia | — | — | — | — | 1.77 (109,483) | — |
| Liberal | Drassi | — | 1.80 (114,066) | — | — | — | — |
| Liberal | Recreate Greece | — | 2.15 (135,960) | — | — | — | 0.53 ▼ (28.936) |
| Liberal | Democratic Alliance | — | 2.55 (161,550) | — | — | — | — |
| Liberal | Drassi/Recreate Greece | — | — | 1.59 (98,140) | 0.91 ▼ (51.749) | — | — |
| Liberal | Greek European Citizens | — | — | — | 1.40 (82,350) | — | — |
| Centre-Right | New Democracy | 33.48 (2,295,967) | 18.85▼ (1,192,103) | 29.66 ▲ (1,825,497) | 22.72 ▼ (1,298,713) | 27.81 ▲ (1,718,815) | 28.10 ▲ (1.526.205 ) |
| Right-Wing | Independent Greeks | — | 10.62 (671,324) | 7.51▼ (462,406) | 3.46 ▼ (197,701) | 4.75 ▲ (293,371) | 3.69 ▼ (200.423 ) |
| Right-Wing | Union for the Fatherland and the People | — | — | — | 1.04 (59.341) | — | — |
| Far Right | Popular Orthodox Rally | 5.63 (386,152) | 2.89▼ (182,925) | 1.58▼ (97,099) | 2.69▲ (154.027) | 1.03▼ (63,692) | — |
| Far Right | Golden Dawn | 0.29 (19,636) | 6.97 ▲ (440,966) | 6.92 ▼ (426,025) | 9.39 ▲ (536,910) | 6.28 ▼ (388,447) | 6.99 ▲ (379.581) |

== See also ==
- Greek withdrawal from the eurozone
- Greek government-debt crisis countermeasures
- 2000s European sovereign debt crisis timeline
- 2010–12 Greek protests
- International Financial Commission
- 1980s austerity policy in Romania
