= Stefanos Manos =

Greek politician (1939–2026)

- Στέφανος Μάνος
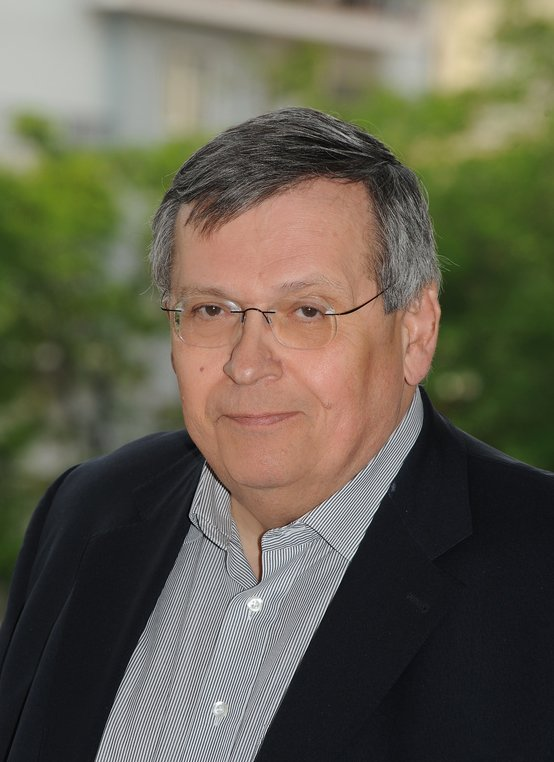

President of Drassi
- In office March 2009 – June 2012
- Deputy: Antypas Karipoglou
- Preceded by: Position established
- Succeeded by: Antypas Karipoglou

Minister of Finance
- In office 7 August 1992 – 13 October 1993
- Prime Minister: Konstantinos Mitsotakis
- Preceded by: Ioannis Paleokrassas
- Succeeded by: Georgios Gennimatas

Personal details
- Born: 20 December 1939 Athens, Greece
- Died: 15 August 2026 (aged 86) Athens, Greece
- Party: New Democracy (before 1999); Liberals (1999–2001); Independent (2001–2004); Panhellenic Socialist Movement (2004–2009); Drassi (2009–2026)
- Education: ETH Zurich; Harvard University

Stefanos Manos (Greek: Στέφανος Μάνος; 20 December 1939 – 15 August 2026) was a Greek politician who was a member of the Hellenic Parliament, and a government minister.

== Life and career ==
His political career started in the New Democracy party, for which he became a Member of Parliament in 1977. During the 1980s he would be the unpopular forerunner of Greek privatization. In April 1999, he formed his own party, The Liberals, but following its unsuccessful performance in the elections held in June for the European parliament (1,62%), he returned to the Hellenic Parliament firstly in 2000 as MP in co-operation with the major party of New Democracy, and again in the 2004 elections as independent by the statewide list but surprisingly on a rival PASOK ticket.

After he suspended his Liberals' operation in 2002, he established in 2009 his new own party, Drassi, which he continued to lead. Heading Drassi, he took part in the 2009 European parliament election (0,76%). In May 2012, Drassi merged with the newly formed party Recreate Greece for the 2012 elections.

Manos was a notable critic of profligate government spending and waste. He is famous for saying in 1992, while he was Greek finance minister, that "it would be cheaper for Greece to send every rail passenger to their destination by taxi", a quote which was used by Michael Lewis in his book Boomerang: Travels in the New Third World.

Manos died after a long illness on 15 August 2026, at the age of 86.

Political offices
New office	Minister of the Environment, Physical Planning and Public Works; 1980	Succeeded by Tzannis Tzannetakis
Preceded by Efthymios Christodoulou	Minister of the National Economy; 1992–1993	Succeeded by Georgios Gennimatas
Preceded by Ioannis Paleokrassas	Minister of Finance; 1992–1993	Succeeded by Georgios Gennimatas
