= Liberal Alliance (Greece) =

Liberal Alliance Φιλελεύθερη Συμμαχία
- President: Despoina Limniotaki
- Secretary-General: Manos Pitropakis
- Vice President: Christos Mavroyannis
- Founded: February 2007
- Dissolved: November 2023
- Ideology: Liberalism (Greek)
- Political position: Centre
- European affiliation: ALDE Party
- Colours: Purple, yellow

Website
- www.fisy.gr

The Liberal Alliance (FISY; Greek: Φιλελεύθερη Συμμαχία, Fileleftheri Symmachia, ΦΙ.ΣΥ.) was a liberal political party in Greece, founded in February 2007. Its stated purpose was to cover the political ground between what it considered to constitute a conservative New Democracy and the socialist PASOK.

The highest organ in Liberal Alliance was its bi-annual congress, which elected a seven member Coordination Committee. The CC after that elected the President.

Liberal Alliance's founding document was the Proclamation of Anavissos, written on 28 April 2007. It contained a reference to Victor Hugo.

The symbol of Liberal Alliance was like @ but instead of 'a' it had the Greek phi letter, which is also the first letter of the word 'liberal' in the Greek language, while the dominating colours are purple and yellow. Initially the logo was the head of Adamantios Korais, until the first party congress.

== History ==
The party participated in the 2007 legislative election in Greece, where it tallied 0,1% of the popular vote, ranking 13th among 21 candidate parties. Its highest percentage was in the first Athens electoral prefecture, where it tallied 544 votes out of 337.000 cast, equaling 0,17%, while its worst percentage was in the prefecture of Pieria, which is the only prefecture where the party fielded no candidates.

It also participated in the 2009 European Parliament elections, with an even lower tally of 0,08% of the popular vote, ranking 24th among 27 candidate parties. The results of the 2009 European Parliament election, considered as catastrophic, led the party to not participate in the 2009 general elections in Greece, held three months later.

In the 2010 local elections, Liberal Alliance participated through the 'Portokali' (meaning "orange" colour) movement in Giorgos Kaminis's 'Dikaioma stin poli' coalition, who won the mayorship of Athens.

In the May 2012 election to the Hellenic Parliament, Liberal Alliance ran in electoral alliance with Drasi. It won 1.8% of the vote. In the June 2012 election, they additionally joined up with Recreate Greece but with just 1.59% of the votes again did not manage to surpass the 3% electoral threshold.

In January 2015, the Liberal Alliance suspended talks about a joint electoral list in the upcoming legislative election with social-liberal To Potami party. The aspired "front against the new two-party system of statists" did not fail on the "serious ideological differences" with To Potami, but on the grounds that the participation of Liberal Alliance's president Gregory Vallianatos had reportedly been ruled out by To Potami, which instead decided to team up with Liberal Alliance's 2012 partner, Drasi.

The Liberal Alliance participated in the euro election of 2019. It received 6,032 votes, or approximately 0.11%.

In November 2023, the 10th congress occurred. During this congress, the dissolution of the party was decided; this was a result of its poor performance in May 2023 Greek legislative election.

== People ==
The following people were associated with Liberal Alliance:

- President: Despoina Limniotaki
- Former President: Makis Spyratos
- Former President: Gregory Vallianatos
- Former President: Giorgos Sarigiannidis
- Former President: Fotis Perlikos

== See also ==
- Liberalism in Greece
- The Liberals (Greece), Greek political party
