= DISY =

DISY may refer to:

- Democratic Alliance (Greece) (Greek: Δημοκρατική Συμμαχία — ΔΗ.ΣΥ.), a political party in Greece
- Democratic Rally (Greek: Δημοκρατικός Συναγερμός — ΔΗ.ΣΥ.), a political party in Cyprus
