= Ioannis Tsoukalas =

Greek politician

Ioannis A. Tsoukalas
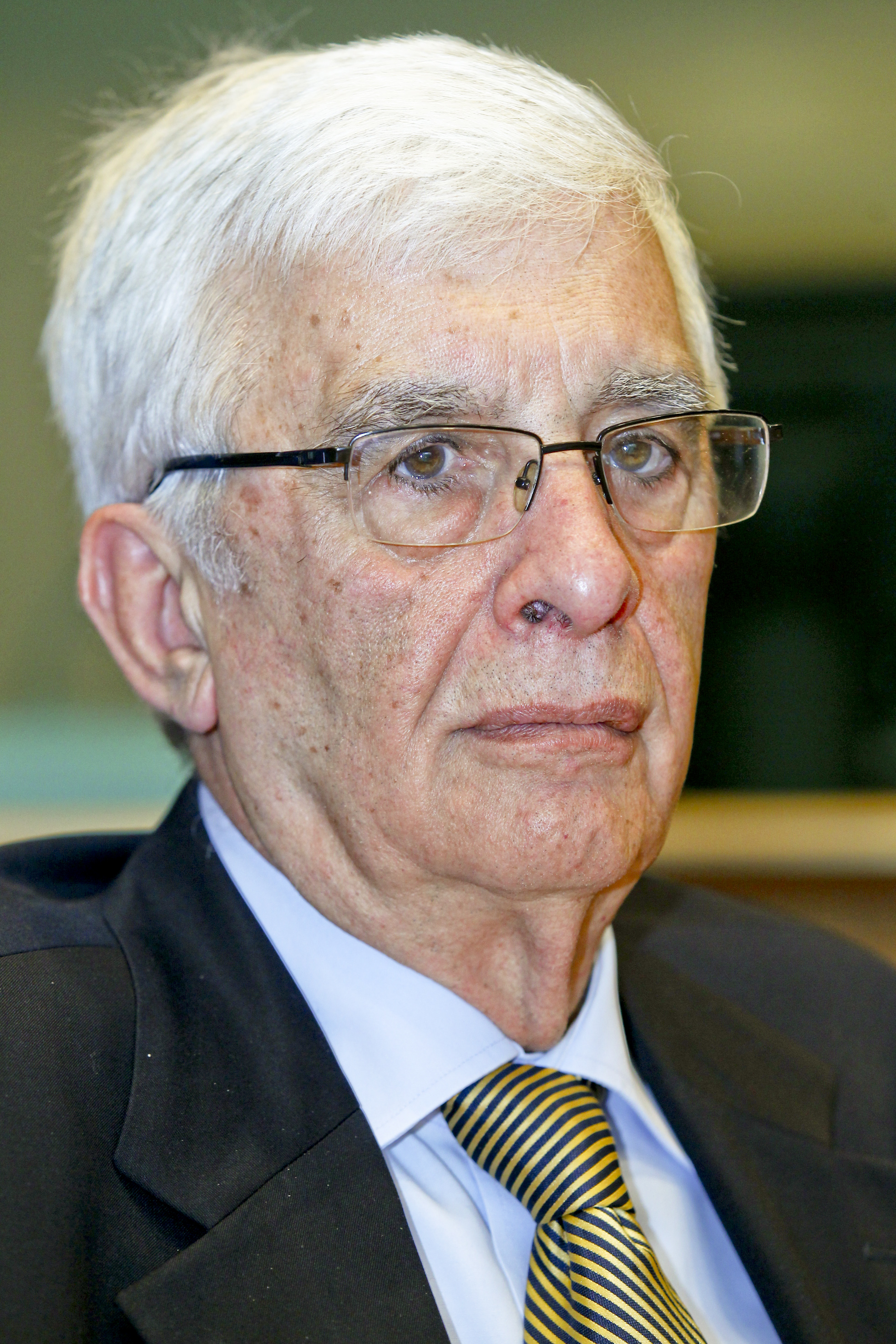

Member of the European Parliament
- In office 2009–2014

Personal details
- Born: 3 July 1941 (age 84) Thessaloniki
- Party: New Democracy
- Children: two daughters
- Profession: Professor Emeritus, Aristotle University of Thessaloniki
- Website: tsoukalas.org

Ioannis Tsoukalas (Greek: Ιωάννης Τσουκαλάς) is a Greek politician and Member of the European Parliament (MEP) for New Democracy; part of the European People's Party.

== Life ==
Born and educated in Thessaloniki, where he also started his professional career, he graduated in physics in 1973 and obtained his PhD in 1975 from the Aristotle University of Thessaloniki. He carried out postdoctoral research in the UK (University of Liverpool), France (Grenoble Institute of Technology), Germany (TU Braunschweig) and USA (MIT, Boston University), focusing on the field of solid state physics and technological materials.

In 1984–1995 he held the position of professor at the department of physics, Aristotle University of Thessaloniki, serving as its chairman in 1984–89. From this position he was responsible for the installation of the first LAN at the university campus, covering 26 buildings, in 1991–93. He was also the first chairman of the university's department of computer science in 1995–99, and continued teaching there until 2008. He also served as president of the ethics committee of the Aristotle University in 1995, president of the university's international relations committee (1997–1998) and as vice-president of the research committee (1999–2004). In addition, in 1998–2004 he held the post of secretary for informatics and new technologies for the conservative New Democracy party, and was general secretary for research and technology at the Ministry of Development in the New Democracy cabinet from 2004 to 2008. From September 2008 he is professor emeritus at the Aristotle University.

At the 2009 European election, Tsoukalas was elected to the European Parliament for the New Democracy (EPP group). He is a member of the Committee on Industry, Research and Energy, the Delegation to the EU-Armenia, EU-Azerbaijan and EU-Georgia Parliamentary Cooperation Committees, the Delegation to the Euronest Parliamentary Assembly and a substitute member of the Committee on Fisheries, the Committee on Petitions and the Delegation to the ACP-EU Joint Parliamentary Assembly.

He is married and has two daughters.

== Literary publications ==
His main research interests are in the field of solid state physics and technological materials. He has published a large number of articles in peer reviewed international journals, has written textbooks, has taught graduate and postgraduate courses, and has supervised many PhD theses. He has published more than 100 research papers in well-known scientific journals, as well as monographs and handbooks in his research field. He is a member of various Greek and international and scientific societies. He has supervised a large number of doctoral theses. He was scientific project manager in a large number of research and development projects, both European and nationally funded.
