= Kolonaki Square =

Square in Kolonaki district, Athens, Greece

Coordinates: 37.9769°N 23.7409°E

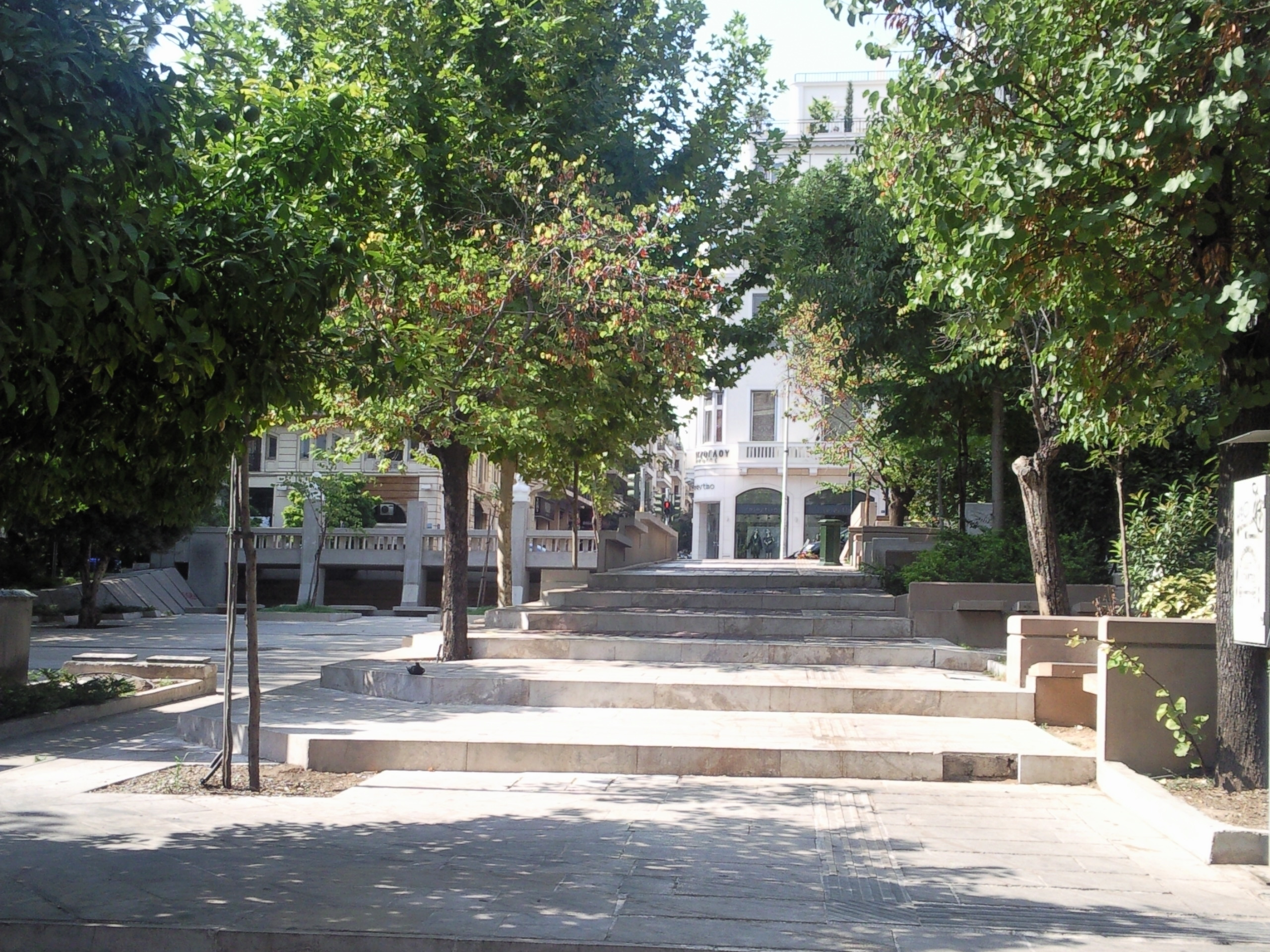
Kolonaki Square

Kolonaki Square (Greek: Πλατεία Κολωνακίου, pronounced [plaˈti.a kolonaˈci.u]) is located in central Athens, Greece. Kolonaki itself is named after the small ancient column in the center of the square; the modern official name of this square is Plateia Filikis Etaireias (Πλατεία Φιλικής Εταιρείας) named for the "Friendly Society" that supported Greek independence.

The square is one block west of Vassilissis Sofias Avenue and is entered by Kanari Street on the southwest, Koumbari Street to the southeast, Kapsali Street to the east, Patriarchou Ioakeim Street to the north, Anagnostopoulou street to the northwest and Tsakalof and Skoufa streets to the west. In the center of the square there is a small ancient column (the square and district are named for the "little column"). This a well-known spot for drinking coffee and people watching.

== Gallery ==
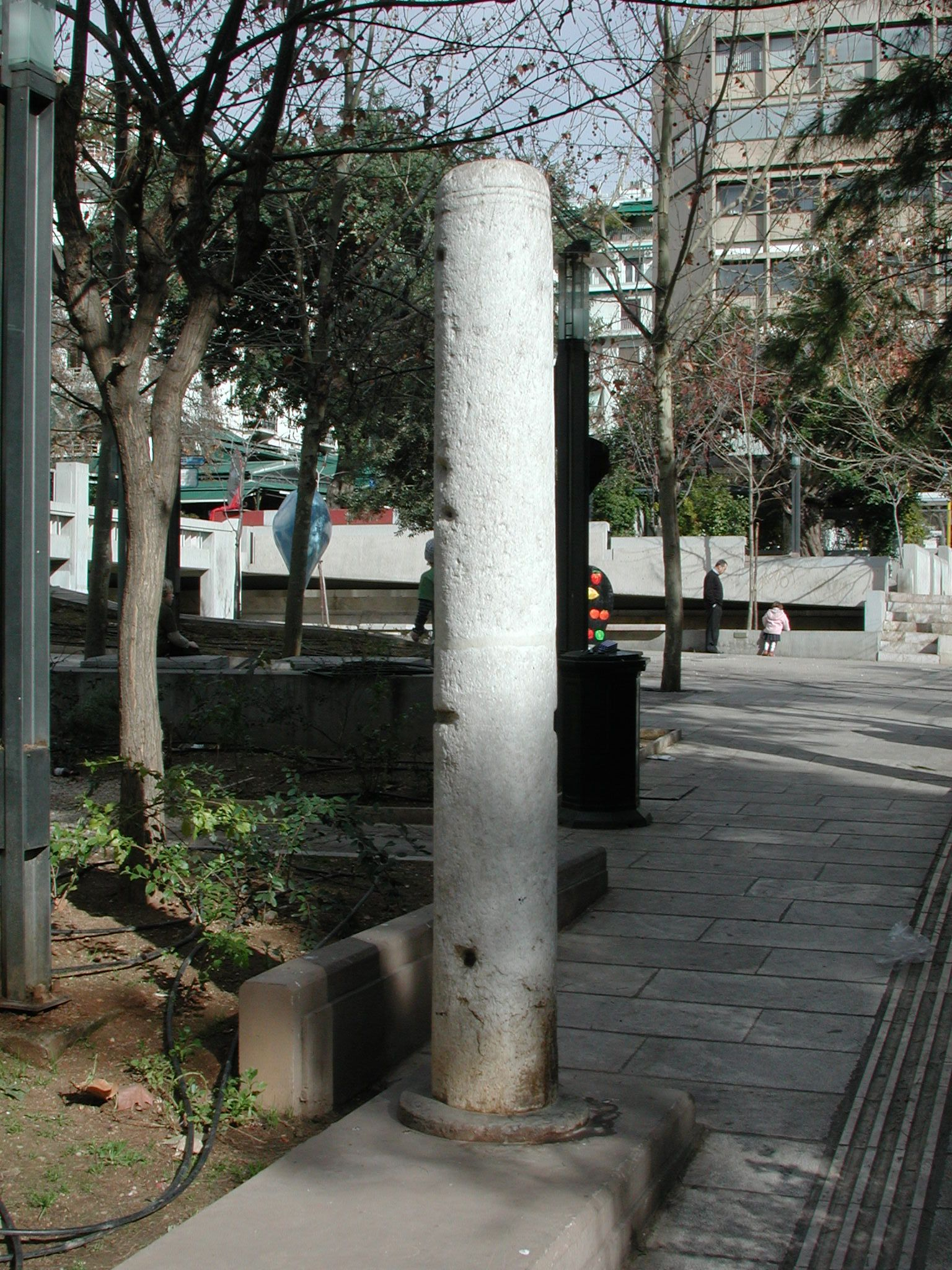
The little column in the square

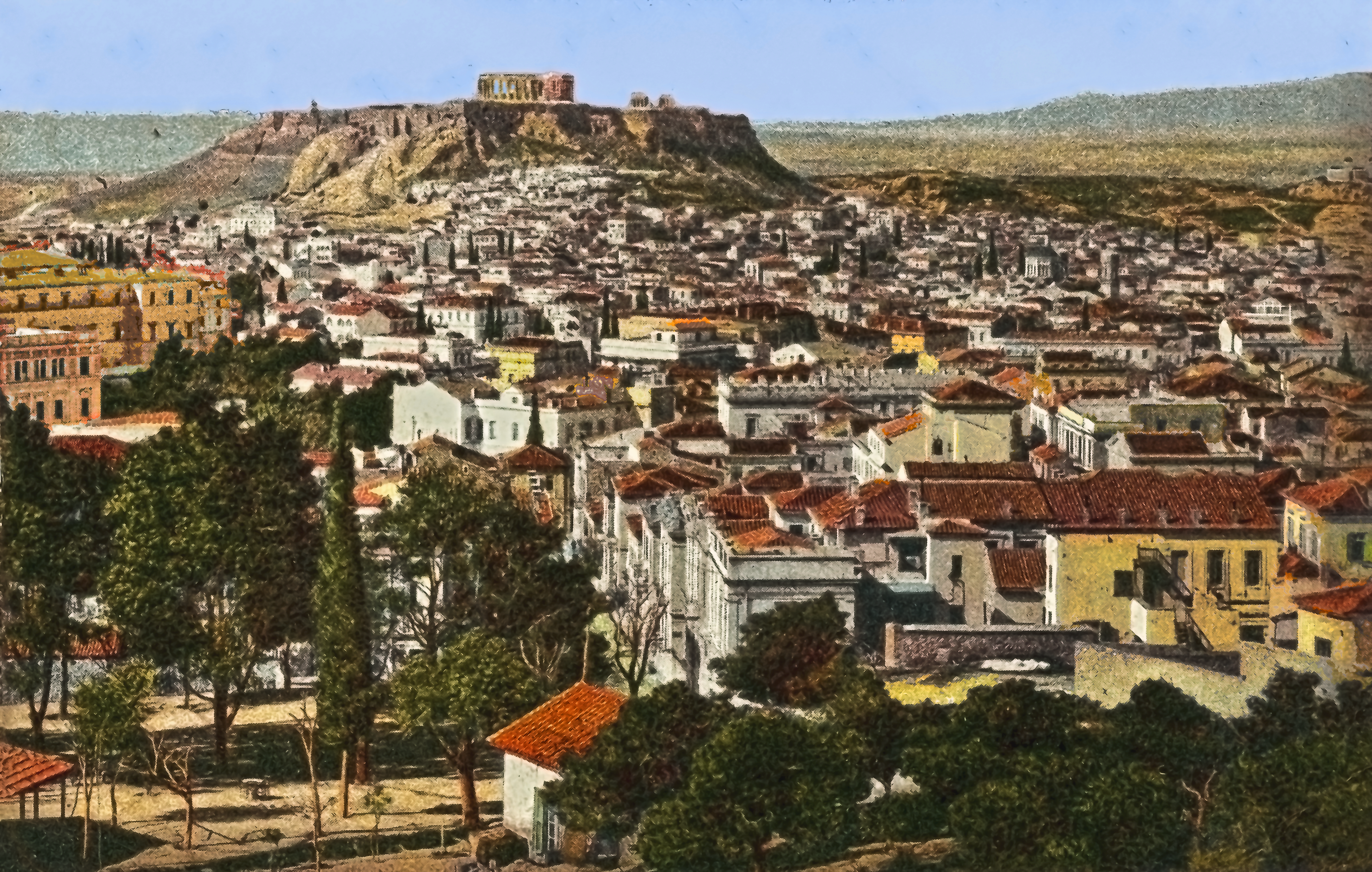
Kolonaki Square ca.1895

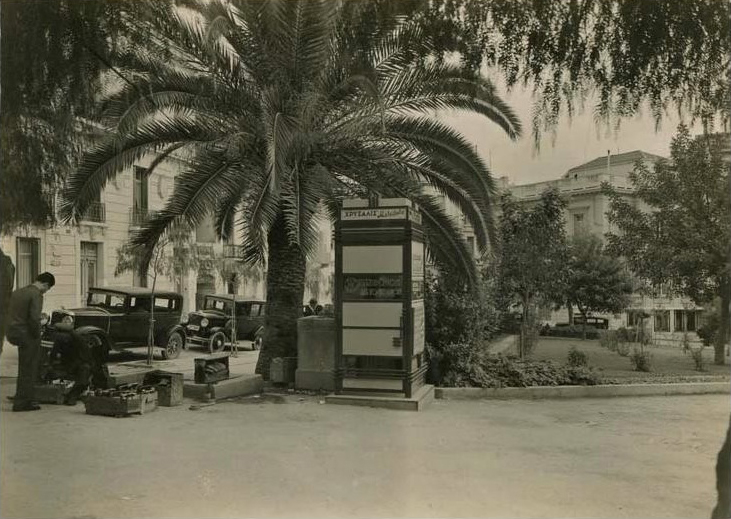
The square in 1925

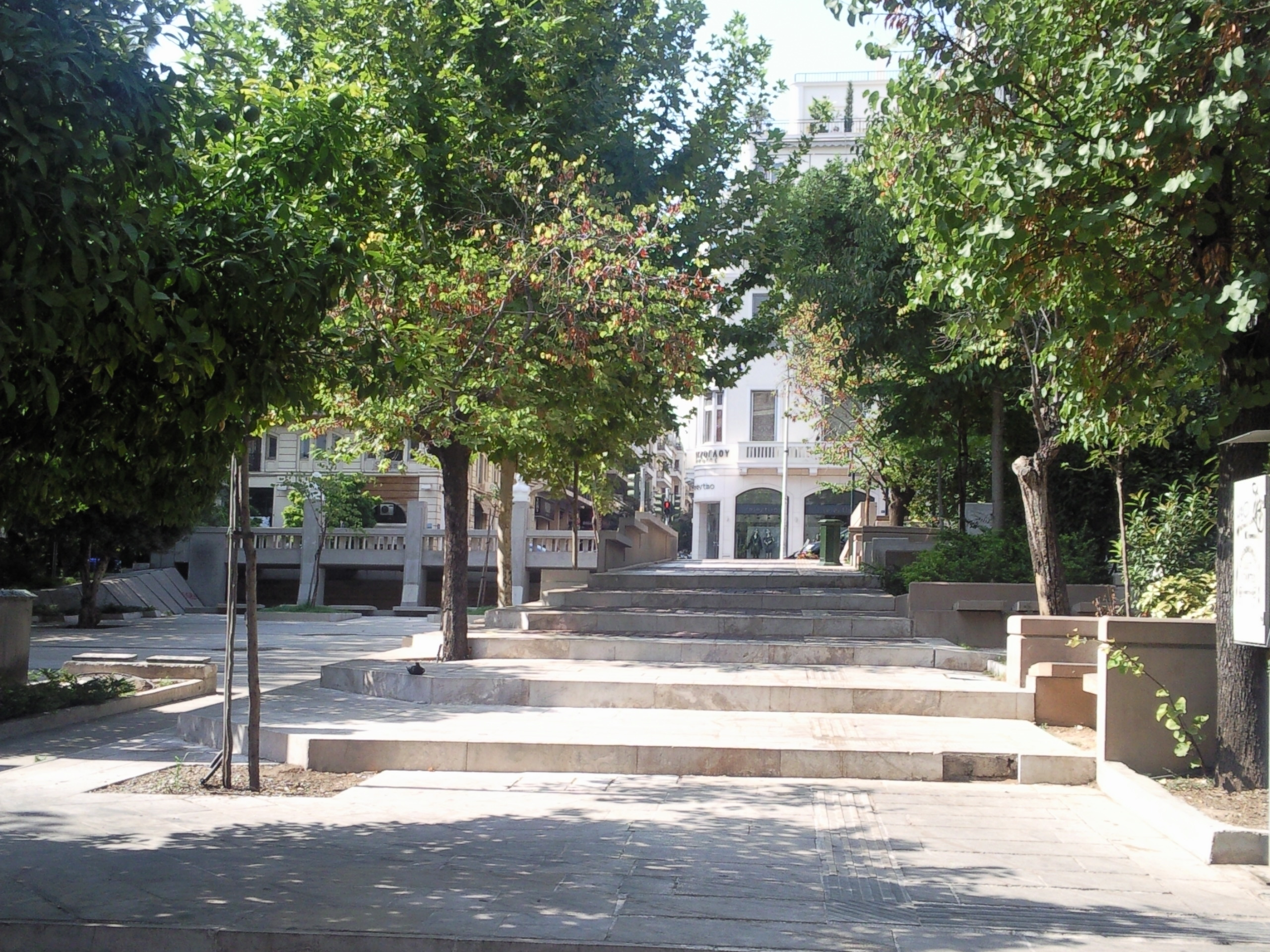
View of the square
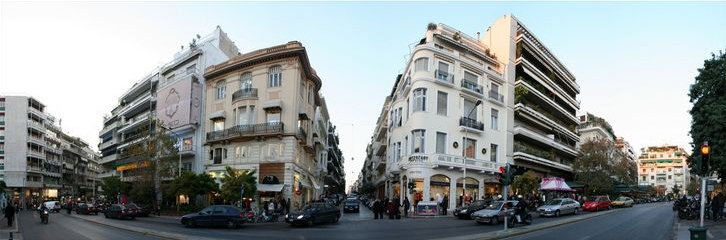
Kolonaki Square
