= Patriotic Humanitarian Movement =

Patriotic Humanitarian Movement Πατριωτικό Ανθρωπιστικό Κίνημα
- Abbreviation: PANAK
- Leader: Georgios Dontas
- Founded: 8 August 2008
- Dissolved: 11 September 2009
- Merged into: Democrats
- Slogan: «For the homeland and humanity» (Greek: «Για τη πατρίδα και την ανθρωπιά»)

The Patriotic Humanitarian Movement (Greek: Πατριωτικό Ανθρωπιστικό Κίνημα, romanized: Patriotikó Anthropistikó Kínima; PANAK) was a minor Greek political party.

Founded on 8 August 2008, it is led by Georgios Dontas.

It came last in the 2009 European Parliament election in Greece.

On 11 September 2009, it was announced that the party would contest the 2009 general election on the ticket of the Democrats party.

== Electoral results ==
Results, 1989–2009 (year links to election page)
Year	Type of Election	Votes	%	Mandates
2009	European Parliament	762	0.01	0
