= Fotis Perlikos =

Greek politician

Fotis Tefos Perlikos (Greek: Φώτης Περλικός; born 1979) was the president of Liberal Alliance, a small political party in Greece formed in 2007.

== Biography ==
Perlikos was born in Piraeus, Greece. He has lived in Profitou Ilia, Nea Smirni, Paleo Faliro, and Kallithea, all areas of Athens, Greece. He studied medicine and is now employed as a medical doctor in Sotiria Hospital. He claims to be a normal everyday citizen, not a professional politician, and not rich.

== Political views ==
According to his writings, he started his exploration in more-or-less left-oriented politics. He later denounced leftism and subscribed to the ideal of individual freedom. He learnt about libertarianism and liberalism from the Internet.

In his writings he refers to Ayn Rand.

== Organisations ==
In 2004 he was associated with the organisation Diktyo Eleftherias (Liberty Network). He was president of Liberal Alliance.

== Interviews ==
The following media organisations have published or broadcast interviews of Fotis Perlikos:

- ET1
- Alpha Radio
- Skai
- Athina 984
- ANT1
- Star
- ALPHA
- NET
