= Greek Unity =

Greek nationalist political party

Greek Unity (Greek: Ελληνική Ενότητα, abbreviated as ΕΛ.ΕΝ.) was a minor Greek nationalist political party.

It was led by Vasileios (also Vasilis) Protopapas (Greek: Βασίλης Πρωτόπαπας), one-time president of the Movement for the Release of Army Officers (Greek: Κίνηση Αποφυλακίσεως Αξιωματικών, which campaigns for the release of the 1967-1975 Junta participants from prison, and vice-president of the Panhellenic Association of Combatants and Friends of the National Resistance Organisation 'X' (Greek: Πανελλήνιος Σύνδεσμος Μαχητών και Φίλων της Εθνικής Αντιστασιακής Οργανώσεως «Χ»).

It contested the 2009 European Parliament elections in Greece. The first name on the party list was Nikolaos Dertilis (Greek: Νικόλαος Ντερτιλής), a former army officer convicted of the murder of a student, Michail Myrogiannis, during the Athens Polytechnic uprising.

As Dertilis remains in prison and did not sign his nomination papers, Greece's supreme court rejected his candidacy on 24 May 2009. Despite this disqualification, his name appeared on the printed ballot papers on polling day.

== Electoral results ==
Results, 1989–2009 (year links to election page)
Year	Type of Election	Votes	%	Mandates
1990	Parliament	210	0,01	0
2009	European Parliament	3,105	0.06	0
