= Theodoros Skylakakis =

Greek politician

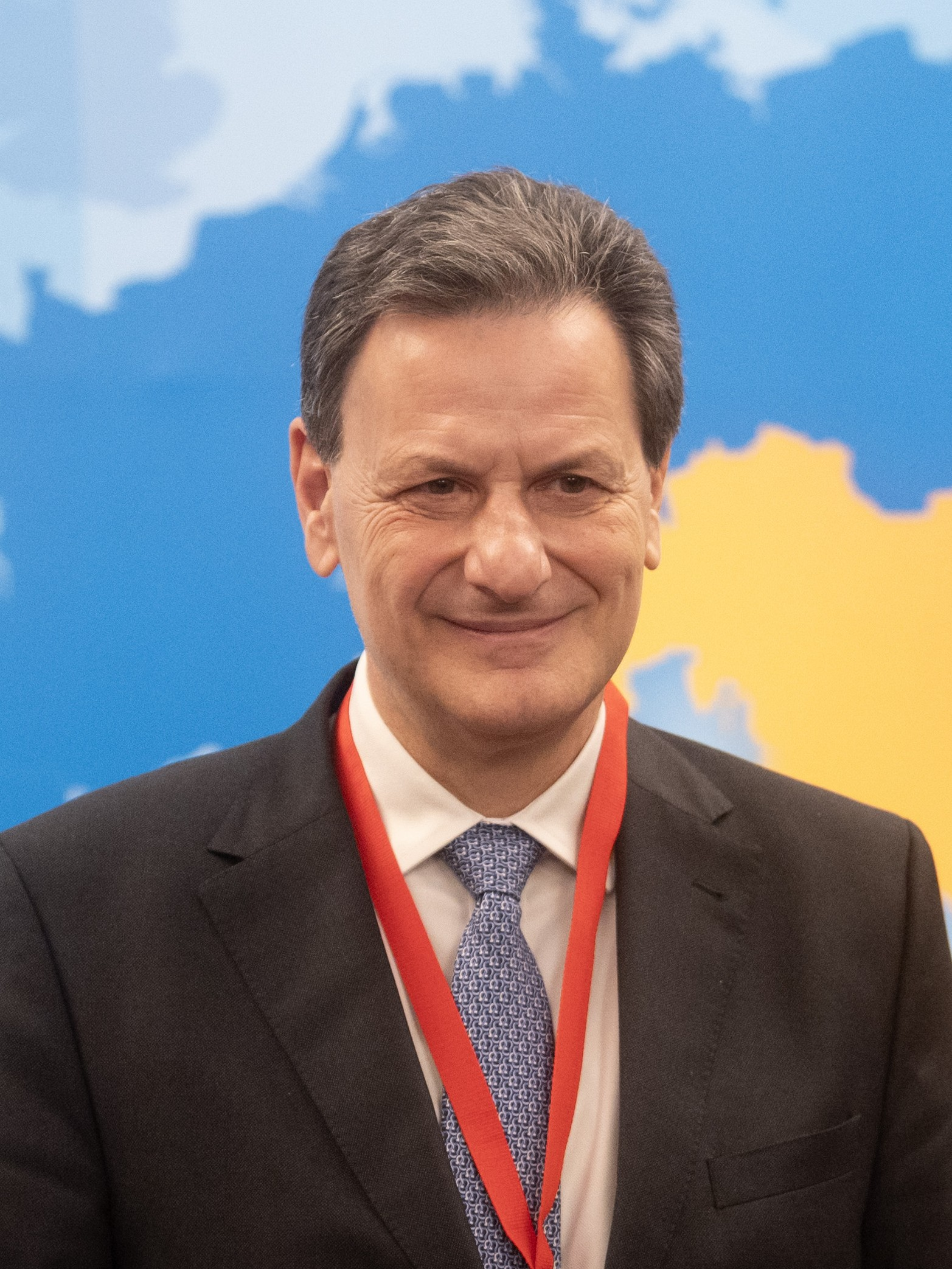

Minister of Environment and Energy
- In office 27 June 2023 – 14 March 2025
- Preceded by: Pantelis Kapros
- Succeeded by: Stavros Papastavrou

Finance State Secretary
- In office July 9, 2019 – August 4, 2020

Member of the European Parliament
- In office July 14, 2009 – July 1, 2014

Alternate Minister for Fiscal Policy
- In office August 4, 2020 – 26 May 2023

Personal details
- Born: October 18, 1959 (age 66) Athens, Greece
- Party: New Democracy (before 2010, 2019–present); Democratic Alliance (2010–2012); Drassi (2012–2019)
- Spouse: Helen Papapanou
- Children: 2

Video statement (English) / (Greek)

Theodoros Skilakakis (born October 18, 1959) is a greek politician. He is a former minister on Mitsotakis cabinet, member of the Alliance of Liberals and Democrats for Europe and Chairman of the Central Committee of the party Drassi.

== Biography ==
Skilakis was born in Athens in 1959.

In 1981 he graduated with honors from the Economics Department of the University of Athens and holds a master's degree (MBA) from City University of London and a diploma from the British Market Research Society Market Research. From 1983 to 1985 he served his military service in the Navy.

He has worked in the advertising and communications since 1985 and founded two companies in the communications (1994 and 2000), one consulting company (2014) and one agricultural (2015). He is married to lawyer Helen Papapanou and they have two daughters, Marianna and Irene.

== Ancestors ==
Skylakakis' grandfather, Theodoros Skylakakis, was an interior minister in the cabinet of dictator Metaxas between May and December 1936.

== Political career ==
In 1989, he served as Advisor to the Prime Minister Tzani Tzannetaki and from 1989 to 1990 as Advisor to the Minister of National Defense. From 1990 to 1993 he served as Advisor to the Prime Minister Constantine Mitsotakis and Head of the Office of Planning and Communication of the Prime Minister. From 1997 to 1998, he was a member of the Policy Planning Secretariat of the New Republic. In the national elections of 2000, he was a parliamentary candidate in the Second Athens.

Municipal Councilor of Athens, he was elected by combining "Athens Tomorrow" led by Dora Bakoyannis and coordinator of the preparation of the combination. From 2003 to 2006 he was Deputy Mayor of Athens, Deputy Mayor for Finance, Deputy Mayor of Municipal Police, Chairman of the Municipal Committee and Mayor Head of the "façade" of Athens. In 2003-2004, he was responsible for the preparation of Athens for the Olympics, during which it was appointed Deputy City Manager. During the tenure of the Municipality of Athens served as Chairman of the Organisation of Tourism and Economic Development Company in 2005-2006 and President of the Coordinating Committee for Intellectual Property Issues in Greece.

On September 21, 2010, was deleted from the New Democracy, as he expressed opposition to the official party line regarding the Memorandum. In November of the same year became a founding member of the Democratic Alliance, of which resigned on 21 May 2012, disagreeing with the electoral party collaboration with New Democracy.

In November 2012 he joined the party Drassi. On June 1, 2013, was elected the third president of Drassi, with 70 votes, succeeding Antypas Karipoglou.
