= Ministry of the Environment, Urban Planning and Public Works =

The Ministry of the Environment, Urban Planning and Public Works of Greece (Greek: Υπουργείο Περιβάλλοντος, Χωροταξίας και Δημοσίων Έργων, commonly abbreviated as ΥΠΕΧΩΔΕ). Following the electoral victory of the Panhellenic Socialist Movement on 4 October 2009, the ministry was split up into a Ministry for the Environment, Energy and Climate Change, while its Public Works sector was merged with the Ministry for Transport and Communications to form the Ministry of Infrastructure, Transport and Networks.

== List of ministers ==
#	Name	Took office	Left office	Party
1	Stefanos Manos	14 March 1980	10 May 1980	New Democracy
2	Tzannis Tzannetakis	10 May 1980	21 October 1981	New Democracy
3	Athanasios Apostolos	21 October 1981	5 October 1984	Panhellenic Socialist Movement
4	Akis Tsochatzopoulos			Panhellenic Socialist Movement
5	Stefanos Manos	11 April 1990	7 August 1991	New Democracy
6	Achilleas Karamanlis	7 August 1991	12 October 1993	New Democracy
7	Kostas Laliotis	25 October 1993	23 October 2001	Panhellenic Socialist Movement
8	Vasso Papandreou	24 October 2001	10 March 2004	Panhellenic Socialist Movement
9	Georgios Souflias	10 March 2004	7 October 2009	New Democracy
