= Georgios Souflias =

Greek politician (1941–2026)

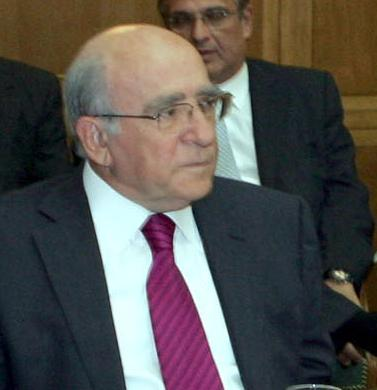
Souflias in 2016

Georgios Souflias (Greek: Γεώργιος Σουφλιάς; 7 July 1941 – 5 June 2026) was a Greek politician. He was a member of the New Democracy political party and was Minister for the Environment, Physical Planning and Public Works for the duration of the Karamanlis administration.

== Life and career ==
Born in Farsala, Larissa Prefecture, Thessaly to a family of Sarakatsani, he graduated in civil engineering from the National Technical University of Athens and he successfully exercised the profession in Larissa from 1966 to 1974. In each election from 1974 to 1996, he was elected as a member of the Greek Parliament from Larissa. He was Deputy Minister for Interior Affairs from November 1977 to May 1980 and Deputy Minister for Coordination from May 1980 to September 1981. From July 1989 to October 1989, he was Minister for the National Economy, and from November 1989 to February 1990, he was Minister for Finance. He served as Minister for the National Economy again from April 1990 to October 1990; he was also Minister for Tourism from April 1990 to May 1990, and from January 1991 to October 1993 he was Minister for National Education and Religious Affairs. He was a candidate for the presidency of New Democracy in 1997, but the presidency was won by Kostas Karamanlis. On 4 February 1998, he was expelled from the party, along with two other members of parliament, for failing to vote along with the party in its opposition to a government policy. He did not run in the 2000 parliamentary election. On the first day of the party's 5th Congress, 30 March 2001, Karamanlis publicly invited Souflias to return to the party, describing the decision to expel him as "painful" and saying that it was made at a "politically charged time". Souflias returned on the last day of the congress, 1 April.

Souflias subsequently became policy planning director of New Democracy while it was in opposition. He was injured, along with his wife, in a car crash on 29 November 2003, and two of his ribs were broken. He was released from hospital on 24 December.

He was elected in the 2004 parliamentary election as a deputy at large for New Democracy. Following this election he became Minister for the Environment, Physical Planning and Public Works in the government of Prime Minister Kostas Karamanlis on 10 March 2004.

In May 1993, he was nominated emeritus professor of human studies of the Greek College of Boston, United States. He was married to Marianna Koraka and had two daughters, Olga and Ioanna.

Souflias died on 5 June 2026, at the age of 84.

Preceded by	Minister for National Economy; 1989	Succeeded by
Preceded by	Minister for Finance; 1989–1990	Succeeded by
Preceded by	Minister for National Economy; 1990	Succeeded by
Preceded by	Minister for National Education and Religious Affairs; 1991–1993	Succeeded by
Preceded by	Minister for the Environment, Physical Planning and Public Works; 2004–2009	Succeeded by Tina Birbili
