= Women for Another Europe =

Women for Another Europe Γυναίκες για μια άλλη Ευρώπη
- Leader: Nena Venetsanou
- Founded: 2004 (March)
- Dissolved: 2004 (August)
- Ideology: Feminism; Anti-capitalism; Anti-racism; Eco-socialism; Pacifism
- Political position: Left-wing

Women for Another Europe (Greek: Γυναίκες για μια άλλη Ευρώπη) was a short-lived electoral coalition in Greece.

The coalition was formed by small left-wing parties that participated in the Coalition of the Radical Left (Renewing Communist Ecological Left etc.), independent feminists, anti-war activists and independent left-wing activists.

The 24 candidates of the list were women, and in the 1st place was Nena Venetsanou, a singer and an active member of the campaign for women's rights.

In the European election, 2004 the coalition gained 0.76% and a few months later merged back into the Coalition of the Radical Left.
