= ROZA =

Radical Left Group ROZA Ομάδα ΡΟΖΑ Omada ROZA
- Founded: 2008
- Dissolved: 2013
- Ideology: Luxemburgism; Feminism; Communism
- Political position: Left-wing
- National affiliation: Coalition of the Radical Left

Website
- Official site

ROZA (Greek: Ομάδα ΡΟΖΑ) was a radical left political party in Greece that was part of the Coalition of the Radical Left.

ROZA was formed in 2008, by independent left-wing activists and members of the Network for Political and Social Rights. The political target of ROZA was the participatory formation of SYRIZA in combination with its programming radicalization. The party was dissolved in 2013.
