= Drassi =

Drassi Δράση
- Leader: Theodoros Skylakakis
- General Secretary: Melina Daskalakis
- Spokesperson: Panagiotis Michalopoulos
- Founder: Stefanos Manos
- Founded: 2009
- Dissolved: 2019
- Preceded by: The Liberals
- Merged into: New Democracy
- Headquarters: 98Α, Vasilissis Sofias Avenue, 11528, Athens
- Ideology: Liberalism; Postnationalism; Decentralization; Economic liberalism Meritocracy; Neoliberalism
- Political position: Centre to centre-right
- European affiliation: Alliance of Liberals and Democrats for Europe
- European Parliament group: No MEPs
- Slogan: Citizens, not clients
- Parliament: 0 / 300
- European Parliament: 0 / 22
- Regions: 39 / 725

Website
- www.drassi.gr

Drassi (Greek: Δράση, "Action") was a liberal political party in Greece. The party was founded in 2009 by Stefanos Manos and was led by former New Democracy member Theodoros Skylakakis. The party had no representation in the Hellenic Parliament or European Parliament. Drassi was a member of the Alliance of Liberals and Democrats for Europe (ALDE) party.

== History ==
Stefanos Manos left New Democracy (ND) in 1999 to found The Liberals, before later running on ND and Panhellenic Socialist Movement (PASOK) electoral lists in 2000 and 2004 respectively. Unlike The Liberals, Drassi was not founded as an expressly liberal party, but claims to espouse "common sense" as an ideological basis.

In its first contested election, the 2009 European elections, Drassi finished ninth with 0.8% of the vote. It subsequently did not participate in the general election in October 2009.

In the May 2012 legislative election, Drassi ran in electoral alliance with the Liberal Alliance. It won 1.8% of the vote finishing twelfth overall, directly behind the Democratic Alliance and Recreate Greece, which both had similar liberal ideologies to Drassi. Ahead of new elections in June 2012 legislative election, Drassi and the Liberal Alliance formed an electoral pact with Recreate Greece, while the Democratic Alliance, which they had also approached, refused to join them and ran on the New Democracy list instead.

In the 2014 European elections, Drassi ran in electoral alliance with Recreate Greece.

On 5 January 2015, Drassi's leader Skylakakis and the leader of The River party, Stavros Theodorakis, gave a press conference announcing a joint electoral list for the January 2015 legislative election.

On 3 September 2015, Drassi decided to again support The River in the upcoming snap September 2015 legislative election.

In January 2017, Drassi decided to migrate with ND.

In February 2019, Drassi was suspended.

== Ideology ==
Drassi was in favor of a small and flexible government through the decrease of the portion of Greek government expenses the party considers unnecessary. Moreover, the party supported privatizations of public assets, using the proceeds for the repayment of undervalued Greek debt in secondary capital markets.

Drassi had been described by the media as a "pro-business-party" supporting free-market reforms.

== Electoral results ==
Results
2009	European Parliament	38,895	0.76%	0
May 2012	Hellenic Parliament	75.428	1.80%^{*}	0
June 2012	Hellenic Parliament	98,050	1.59%^{**}	0
2014	European Parliament	51,749	0.91%^{***}	0

^{*} In alliance with Liberal Alliance
^{**} In alliance with Recreate Greece and Liberal Alliance
^{***} In alliance with Recreate Greece
