= 2009 European Parliament election in Greece =

- 7 June 2009

22 seats in the European Parliament
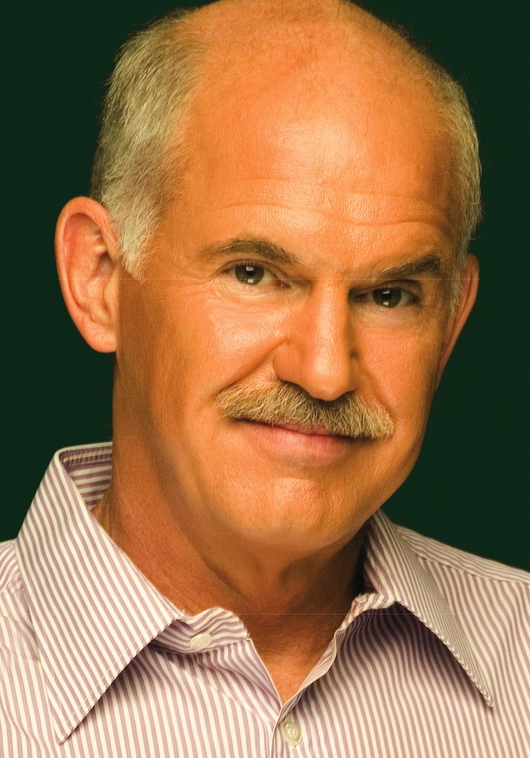

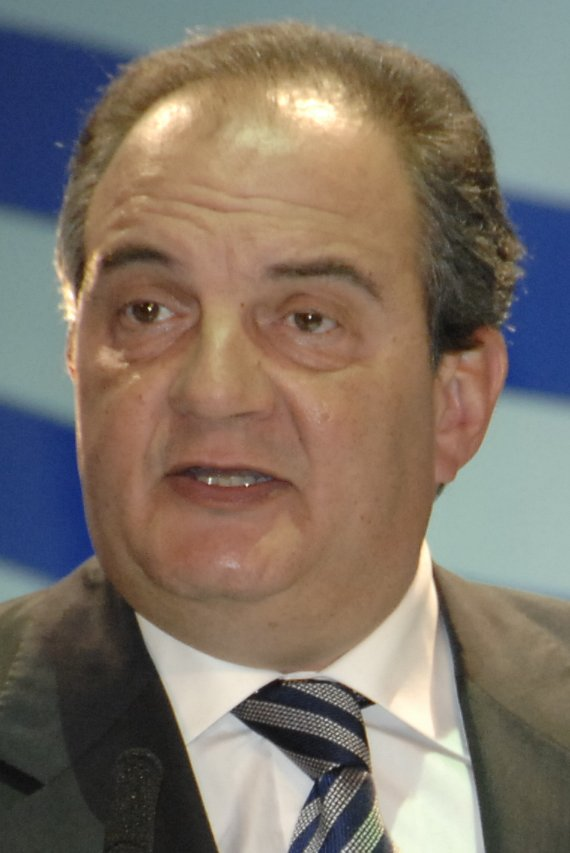

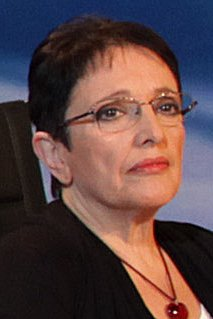

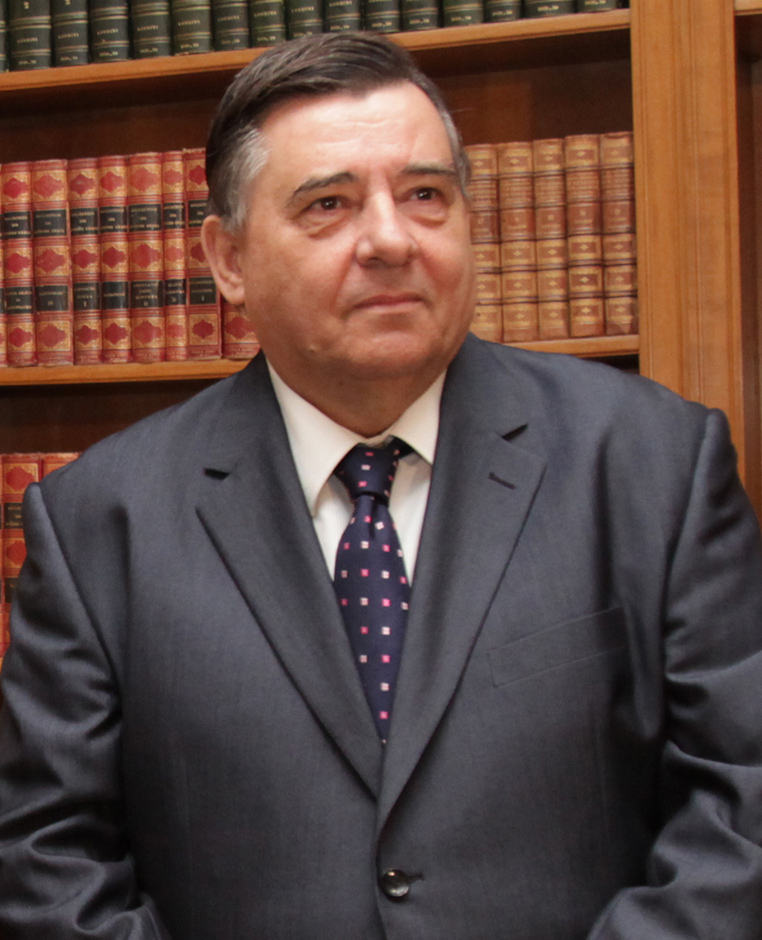

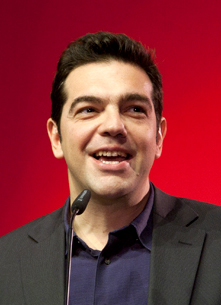
	Majority party	Minority party	Third party
Leader	George Papandreou	Kostas Karamanlis	Aleka Papariga
Party	PASOK	ND	KKE
Alliance	S&D	EPP	GUE/NGL
Last election	34.03%, 8 seats	43.01%, 11 seats	9.48%, 3 seats
Seats won	8	8	2
Seat change	Steady	▼3	▼1
Popular vote	1,879,229	1,656,085	428,151
Percentage	36.65%	32.30%	8.35%
Swing	▲2.62pp	▼10.71pp	▼1.13pp
	Fourth party	Fifth party	Sixth party
Leader	Georgios Karatzaferis	Alexis Tsipras	6-member committee
Party	LAOS	Syriza	OP
Alliance	EFD	GUE/NGL	Greens/EFA
Last election	4.12%, 1 seat	4.16%, 1 seat	0.67%, 0 seats
Seats won	2	1	1
Seat change	▲1	Steady	▲1
Popular vote	366,616	240,971	178,960
Percentage	7.15%	4.70%	3.49
Swing	▲3.03pp	▲0.54pp	▲2.82pp
- Results by constituency

European Parliament elections were held in Greece on 7 June 2009 to elect the 22 Greek members of the European Parliament. Members were elected by party-list proportional representation with a 3% electoral threshold. The number of seats allocated to Greece was reduced from 24 to 22, as a result of new member states joining the European Union (EU). Consistent with EU-wide rules, Greek citizens resident in another of the 26-member states were permitted to vote in the place where they currently reside.

== Participating parties ==
On 24 May, the Greek Court of Cassation, the country's supreme court, accepted the applications of 27 of the 33 parties which applied to contest the elections. It banned six parties from participating:

- Alternative Ecologists
- Party of Responsible Citizenship
- Dimokratiki
- Party of Uprising Pensioners of Greece
- Panagriarian Workers Movement
- Political Greek-European Animal-Loving Movement
- Animal-Loving Ecologists of Greece

In addition, the court ruled that the following parties could not participate as part of the Coalition of the Radical Left:

- Democratic Social Movement
- Movement of Active Citizens
- Movement for the Unity of Action of the Left
- Kokkino
- Ecosocialists of Greece
- ROZA

A judicial dispute ensued, when Drassi filed a petition before the Council of State to annul the ministerial decision, through which the time for political advertising spots on the radio and television would be allocated, since it disproportionately favoured established parties. A preliminary ruling sent the dispute to the Council of State's plenary session, which will hear the petition for annulment on 25 September 2009.

== Opinion polls ==
Source	Date	PASOK	ND	Syriza	KKE	LAOS	EcoGreens	Undecided and others
RASS	09-03-09	32.1	29.6	7.9	7.1	5.1	3.2	–
VPRC	09-04-00	37	34	8.5	8	4.5	5	3
MATN	09-05-04	36.4	33.6	7.9	9.1	5.4	6.3	1.3
Focus	09-05-10	31.7	29.6	6.4	7.5	4.7	4.2	3.3
PulseRC	09-05-10	31	28	5.6	6.6	4.4	4.8	2
Marc	09-05-10	31.8	28.6	6.2	8.1	4.3	4.8	2
ALCO	09-05-10	30.2	26.5	5.3	7.8	4	3.5	2.9
Barometer	09-05-10	28	23.5	5.5	5.5	5.5	4	1
Public Issue	09-05-18	34	28	6	5.5	5	7	–
Alco	09-05-18	30.2	26.1	4.2	6.4	3.6	5.7	–
VPRC	09-05-20	37.5	32	6.5	8	5	7.5	–
MRB/Eleftheros Typos	09-05-24	29.2	26.4	6.6	6.2	4.6	6.2	5.1
Kappa/Aggelioforos	09-05-24	31.5	28.4	7.3	5.3	4.4	8.1	5.1
GPO	09-05-26	30	26.3	7	6	6	8.5	
Metron	09-05-26	27.3	23.5	7.2	4.9	4.5	7.9	
Public Issue/Kathimerini	09-05-27	33	28.5	5	5.5	4.5	8.5	15

== Results ==
Party	Votes	%	Seats	+/–
PASOK	1,879,229	36.65	8	0
New Democracy	1,656,085	32.30	8	–3
Communist Party of Greece	428,151	8.35	2	–1
Popular Orthodox Rally	366,616	7.15	2	+1
Syriza	240,971	4.70	1	0
Ecologist Greens	178,960	3.49	1	+1
Panhellenic Macedonian Front	65,141	1.27	0	New
Party of Greek Hunters	64,824	1.26	0	New
Drassi	38,908	0.76	0	New
Ecologists of Greece	33,292	0.65	0	New
Greek Ecologists	31,165	0.61	0	0
Golden Dawn	23,609	0.46	0	New
Antarsya	21,988	0.43	0	0
Union of Centrists	19,686	0.38	0	0
Marxist–Leninist Communist Party of Greece	13,138	0.26	0	0
Popular Unions of Bipartisan Social Groups	10,488	0.20	0	New
Society – Political Party of the Successors of Kapodistrias	7,934	0.15	0	New
Hellenic Direct Democracy Movement	7,928	0.15	0	New
Liberal Party–Libertas.eu	6,489	0.13	0	New
Youth Party	6,205	0.12	0	New
Workers Revolutionary Party	6,042	0.12	0	New
Fighting Socialist Party of Greece	5,618	0.11	0	0
European Free Alliance–Rainbow	4,512	0.09	0	0
Liberal Alliance	4,319	0.08	0	New
Greek Unity	3,001	0.06	0	New
Organization for the Reconstruction of the Communist Party of Greece	2,797	0.05	0	0
Patriotic Humanitarian Movement	800	0.02	0	New
Total	5,127,896	100.00	22	–2
Valid votes	5,127,896	97.46		
Invalid/blank votes	133,853	2.54		
Total votes	5,261,749	100.00		
Registered voters/turnout	10,014,795	52.54		
Source: Ministry of the Interior
