= Creation (political party) =

Greek political party

Creation Δημιουργία Dimiourgía
- President: vacant
- Vice Presidents: Vasilis Panidis; Anastasios Karachristianidis
- Founder: Thanos Tzimeros
- Founded: 8 December 2011
- Ideology: Pro-Europeanism; Right-libertarianism; Neoliberalism; Conservative liberalism; Anti-communism; Anti-immigration; Anti-Islam
- Political position: Far-right
- National affiliation: National Creation (2022–23)
- Colours: Orange; Blue
- Hellenic Parliament: 0 / 300
- European Parliament: 0 / 21

Website
- dimiourgiaxana.gr

The Creation (Greek: Δημιουργία, romanized: Dimiourgía), formerly Recreate Greece (Greek: Δημιουργία, Ξανά, romanized: Dimiourgia, Xana, pronounced [ðimiuɾˈʝia ksaˈna], lit. 'Create, again'), is a Greek far-right political party, which has adopted an ideology heavily focused on anti-immigration, anti-Islam and anti-communism.

== History ==
Former party logo

Founded in December 2011, it is led by Thanos Tzimeros and is self-identified as a citizen-centered political movement, with emphasis on the rebuilding of the Greek state.

The party participated in the May 2012 Greek legislative election shortly after being founded, receiving 2.15% of the total vote, short of the 3% threshold needed to enter Parliament. In the repeat elections in June, it formed an electoral alliance with Drasi, a fellow liberal party that had finished directly below them in the May election with 1.8% of the vote. Recreate Greece also approached Democratic Alliance, but the latter opted to run on the New Democracy list instead. In the 17 June 2012 elections, the combined parties garnered only 1.59%, a lower vote than either got in the elections the month before. Drasi would later merge with New Democracy, while Recreate Greece declined further, receiving 0.53% in the 2015 election and 0.74% in 2019. In 2020, Thanos Tzimeros announced a new coalition with far-right politician Failos Kranidiotis, which was later merged with a new party formed by Greek conservative MP Constantinos Bogdanos, and named National Creation.

After the party's failure to enter parliament in May 2023 general election Thanos Tzimeros resigned from president and the coalition got dissolved.

On 15–17 January 2024, elections were taken place for the party's new president and Vangelis Aktsalis was elected. In April 2024, the party was renamed to "Creation". After the European elections of 2024, Aktsalis resigned.

== Ideology and leadership ==
Originally, the party's ideology has been referred to as classical liberalism and that it used to promote neoliberal ideas of free markets and small government. Because of his involvement for over a decade, it is widely believed that the party's leader Thanos Tzimeros shapes the party's ideology. His speeches and beliefs have changed over the years, shifting the party further to the right. He has been described as extreme or far-right. Tzimeros has described the Greek Communist Party as dangerous and that it must be outlawed, whilst he compares it to neo-Nazism. In some cases, he even expressed controversial opinions about the Greek National Resistance being a historical crime. He tends to have controversial views on migration, which have been described as racist, and often proclaims that Islam is a threat.

Other notable incidents include Tzimeros' calls to overthrow the government in June 2015 which led to a criminal investigation.

== Election results ==
=== Hellenic Parliament ===
Election	Hellenic Parliament					Rank	Government	Leader
Election	Votes	%	±pp	Seats won	+/−	Rank	Government	Leader
May 2012	135,960	2.15%	New	0 / 300	New	11th	Extra-parliamentary	Thanos Tzimeros
Jun 2012 (Note: Run in coalition with Drassi and FISY.)	98,140	1.59%	–2.36	0 / 300	0	8th	Extra-parliamentary	Thanos Tzimeros
Jan 2015	Did not contest			0 / 300	0	—N/a	Extra-parliamentary	Thanos Tzimeros
Sep 2015	28,909	0.53%	–1.06	0 / 300	0	13th	Extra-parliamentary	Thanos Tzimeros
2019	41,631	0.74%	+0.21	0 / 300	0	10th	Extra-parliamentary	Thanos Tzimeros
May 2023 (Note: Run as part of the National Creation coalition.)	48,087	0.81%	+0.07	0 / 300	0	10th	Extra-parliamentary	Thanos Tzimeros

=== European Parliament ===
European Parliament
Election	Votes	%	±pp	Seats won	+/−	Rank	Leader	EP Group
2014 (Note: Run in a joint list with Drassi.)	51,749	0.91%	New	0 / 21	New	13th	Thanos Tzimeros	−
2019	39,217	0.69%	−0.22	0 / 21	Steady	18th	Thanos Tzimeros	−
2024	14,024	0.35%	−0.34	0 / 21	0	19th	Vangelis Aktsalis	−
