= The Liberals (Greece) =

The Liberals Οι Φιλελεύθεροι Oi Fileleftheroi
- Founder: Stefanos Manos
- Founded: 1999
- Dissolved: 2001
- Split from: New Democracy
- Succeeded by: Drassi
- Ideology: Social liberalism Liberalism; Neoliberalism
- Political position: Centre
- European affiliation: Alliance for Liberals and Democrats

The Liberals (Greek: Οι Φιλελεύθεροι, Oi Fileleftheroi) was a liberal political party in Greece founded by Stefanos Manos in April 1999. The president suspended operations of the party in October 2001, citing economic problems and limited appeal amongst the voting public.

== History ==
The party participated independently in popular elections only once, in the 1999 European Parliament elections, gaining 1.72% of the popular vote. In the 2000 national elections, Stefanos Manos and the Liberals entered the Parliament cooperating with New Democracy. In 2004, Stefanos Manos accepted an invitation by George Papandreou, president of the Panhellenic Socialist Party and was elected, like Andreas Adrianopoulos, in the 2004 national elections riding PASOK's ticket.

== Electoral results ==
Results, 1993-1999 (year links to election page)
| Year | Type of Election | Votes | % | Mandates |
|---|---|---|---|---|
| 1999 | European Parliament | 103,962 | 1.62 | 0 |
| 2000 | Parliament | participated with ND | - | 2 |

== See also ==
- Liberalism
- Contributions to liberal theory
- Liberalism worldwide
- Liberalism in Greece
