= Democratic Alliance (Greece) =

Political party in Greece

Democratic Alliance Δημοκρατική Συμμαχία
- Leader: Dora Bakoyannis
- Secretary-General: Olga Tremi
- Spokesperson: Thanos Zorbas
- Founded: 21 November 2010
- Dissolved: 21 May 2012
- Split from: New Democracy
- Merged into: New Democracy
- Headquarters: 47 Syggrou Av., 117 43 Athens
- Ideology: Neoliberalism; Centrism
- Political position: Centreto centre-right
- National affiliation: New Democracy
- European affiliation: Alliance of Liberals and Democrats for Europe Party
- European Parliament group: Alliance of Liberals and Democrats for Europe
- Colours: Blue, orange

Website
- www.dimsim.gr

The Democratic Alliance (Greek language: Δημοκρατική Συμμαχία — ΔΗ.ΣΥ., Dimokratiki Symmachia — DISY) was a centrist neoliberal political party in Greece. It was founded on 21 November 2010 by Dora Bakoyannis, a few months after she was expelled from the centre-right party New Democracy for voting in support of a European Union-International Monetary Fund backed financial stability loan. The party's founding congress took place on 27 May 2011.

On 21 May 2012, the party rejoined New Democracy.

== Representation ==
The party had one MEP in the European Parliament (defected from ND):

- Theodoros Skylakakis

== Political positions ==
As outlined in its founding declaration, the Democratic Alliance defines itself politically as a centrist movement that is ideologically inspired by the anthropocentric values of humanism, the rational thought and personal freedom brought forth by the Enlightenment, as well as the economic, political and social freedom of liberalism as an underpinning for social justice. It is also influenced by the 19th and 20th century struggles for social solidarity in Europe. Some of the positions advocated by the party are:

- A drastic reduction in taxation, by instituting a 20% flat tax. This tax rate would not apply to people with really low incomes, as it would be complemented by a system that replaces the currently existing tax cuts with negative taxation.
- A reduction in the number of civil servants and the abolition of tenure, for those hired from now on, that would allow the government to function with 2/3 of its current workforce. This would be coupled with increased salaries, for those that remain, that would be pinned to performance evaluations.
- A law that would force trade union leaders themselves to work.
- Introducing the requirement of secret ballot voting for all decisions of strike action.
- Introducing a coupon-based system of education.

== Electoral results ==
=== Parliament ===
| Election year | # of overall votes | % of overall vote | # of overall seats won | +/- | Notes |
|---|---|---|---|---|---|
| 2012 (May) | 161,550 | 2.6 (#10) | 0 / 300 | | |
