= Haris Kastanidis =

Greek politician (born 1956)

Haris Kastanidis MP
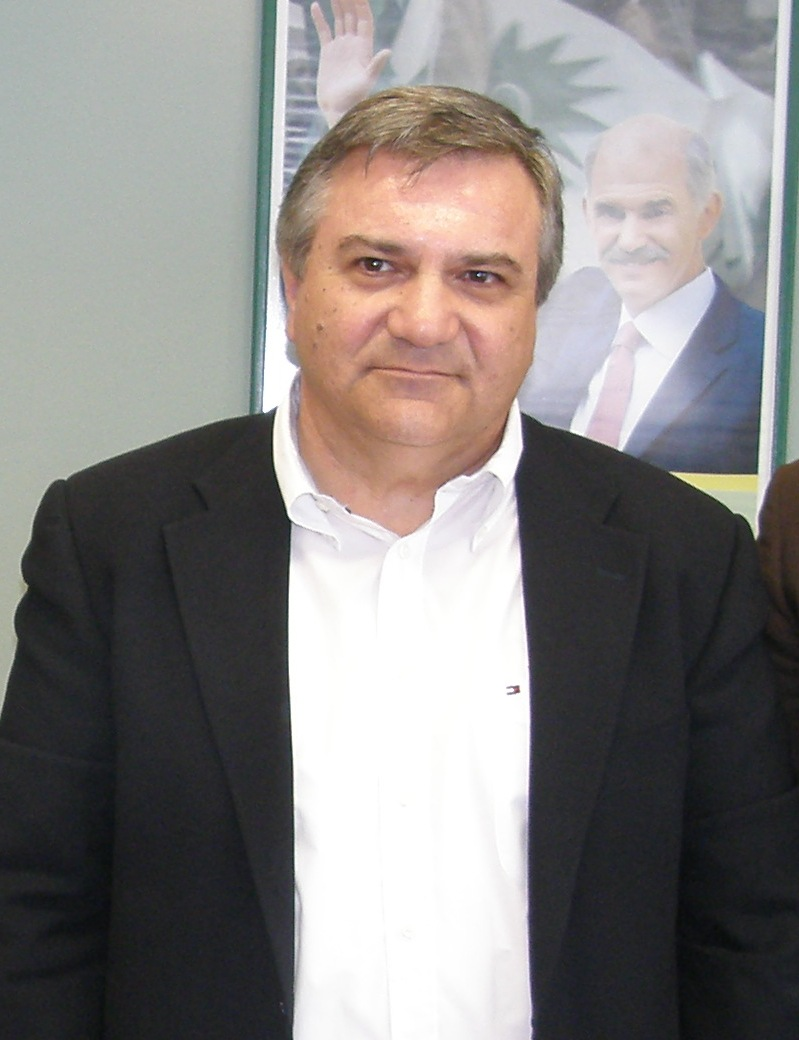

Minister for the Interior
- In office 17 June 2011 – 11 November 2011
- President: Karolos Papoulias
- Prime Minister: George Papandreou

Minister for Justice, Transparency and Human Rights
- In office 7 October 2009 – 17 June 2011
- President: Karolos Papoulias
- Prime Minister: George Papandreou

Personal details
- Born: 1956 (age 69–70) Thessaloniki, Greece
- Party: KIDISO (2015–present); DIMAR (2013–2014); KOISY (2012); PASOK (until 2012)
- Other political affiliations: KINAL
- Education: Aristotle University of Thessaloniki
- Profession: Lawyer

Haris Kastanidis (Greek: Χάρης Καστανίδης, born 11 March 1956 in Thessaloniki, Greece) is a Greek politician who served as Minister for Justice, Transparency and Human Rights and Minister for the Interior under George Papandreou. A former member of the Panhellenic Socialist Movement, he is now a member of the splinter Movement of Democratic Socialists within the Movement for Change.

== Early life ==
M.P. Haris Kastanidis was born in Thessaloniki, Greece in 1956. He graduated from the Law School of the Aristotle University of Thessaloniki and completed his studies with a Post-Graduate degree in Criminal Law.

He became a member of PASOK on its foundation in 1974 and was elected for the first time as a member of the Hellenic Parliament in the elections of 1981 being only 25 years old. In 1984 he was elected as a member of the PASOK Central Committee.

== Offices ==
He held his first government post in the Ministry for the Interior and Public Order as a Deputy Minister, from 25 July 1985 until 25 April 1986. From 9 September 1988 until 18 November 1988, he held the post of Deputy Minister of National Education and Religious Affairs. From 18 November 1988 until 29 November 1988, he served as Deputy Minister for the Interior. On 15 September 1995 he was appointed Minister for the Interior, Public Administration and Decentralisation, a post which he held until 22 January 1996.

On 22 January 1996 he was appointed the Minister for Transport and Communications, a position that he held until he resigned on 2 September 1997. From 7 July 2003 until 10 March 2004, he was the Minister for Macedonia and Thrace. From March 2004 until August 2007 he held the position of PASOK spokesman.

== 2009 elections ==
From 7 October 2009 to 17 June 2011, he served as the Minister for Justice, Transparency and Human Rights. On 17 June 2011, after a government reshuffle, he was appointed Minister for the Interior, a post that he held until 11 November 2011.

Haris Kastanidis was expelled from the PASOK parliamentary group after voting against Greece's loan deal with its foreign creditors. On 14 March 2012 he and Louka Katseli formed the Social Agreement party, which failed to win a seat at the May 2012 election. He later joined George Papandreou's Movement of Democratic Socialists, and was re-elected to parliament at the 2019 election as a member of the Movement for Change.
