= Social Agreement (Greece) =

Social Agreement Κοινωνική Συμφωνία
- Leader: Panagiotis Dimitroulopoulos
- Founded: 14 March 2012
- Dissolved: 2019
- Split from: PASOK
- Ideology: Democratic socialism Social democracy
- Political position: Centre-left
- Colours: Green
- Parliament: 0 / 300
- European Parliament: 0 / 22
- Regions: 0 / 725

Website
- www.koinonikisymfonia.gr

Social Agreement for Greece in Europe (Greek: Κοινωνική Συμφωνία για την Ελλάδα στην Ευρώπη), abbreviated as Social Agreement (Κοινωνική Συμφωνία), alternatively translated as Social Pact, was a political party in Greece, established in March 2012.

It was formed by parliamentarians and two former ministers of the Panhellenic Socialist Movement (PASOK) who were expelled from the party after voting against the country's new loan deal with foreign creditors. It was led by Louka Katseli, former Minister for Labour, and Haris Kastanidis, former Minister of the Interior.

In the May 2012 elections, the party won 60,753 votes (0.96%) and no seats.

In the January 2015 legislative elections, the party joined forces with Syriza.
