= May 2012 Greek parliamentary election =

- 6 May 2012

All 300 seats in the Hellenic Parliament 151 seats needed for a majority
- Opinion polls
- Registered: 9,945,859
- Turnout: 65.12% (▼5.83pp)
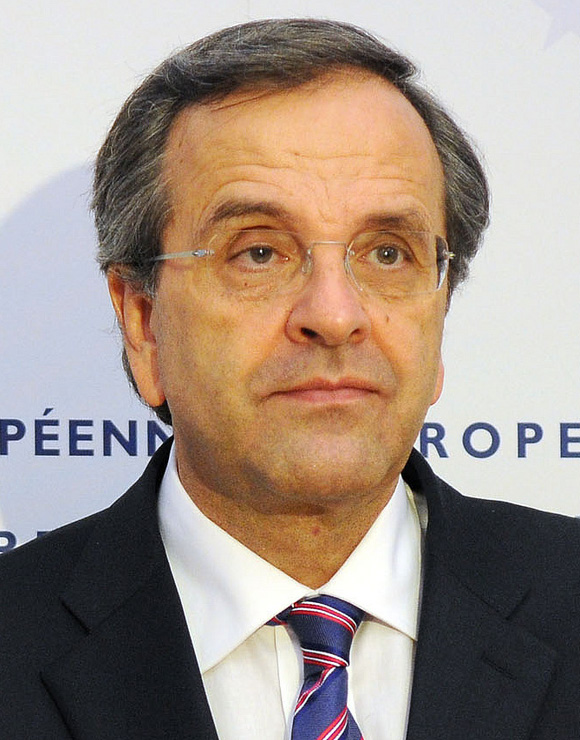

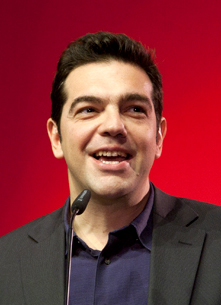

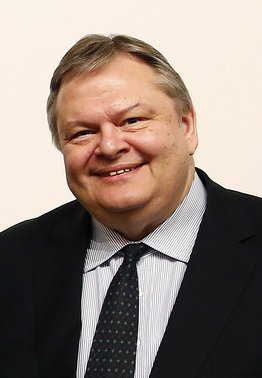

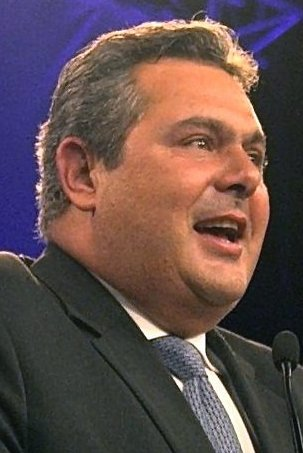

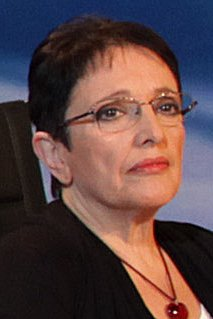

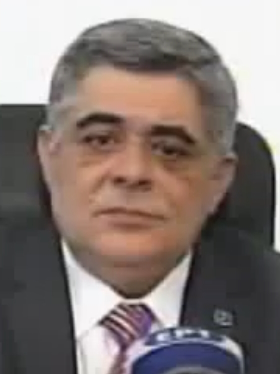

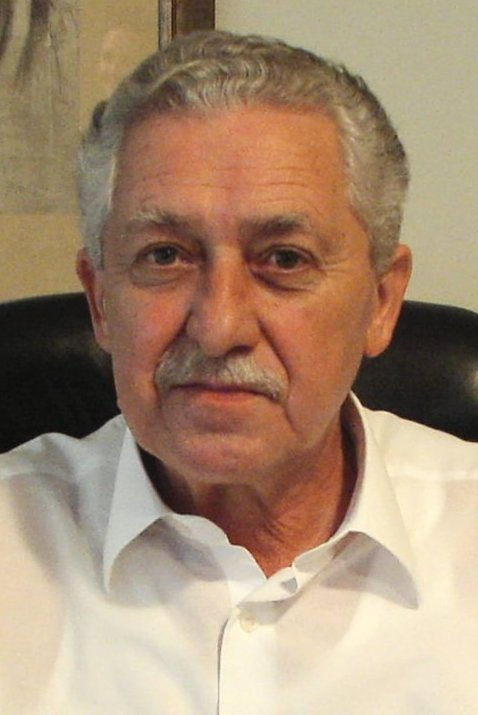
	First party	Second party	Third party
Leader	Antonis Samaras	Alexis Tsipras	Evangelos Venizelos
Party	ND	Syriza	PASOK
Last election	33.47%, 91 seats	4.60%, 13 seats	43.92%, 160 seats
Seats won	108	52	41
Seat change	▲17	▲39	▼119
Popular vote	1,192,103	1,061,928	833,452
Percentage	18.85%	16.79%	13.18%
Swing	▼14.62pp	▲12.19pp	▼30.74pp
	Fourth party	Fifth party	Sixth party
Leader	Panos Kammenos	Aleka Papariga	Nikolaos Michaloliakos
Party	ANEL	KKE	ΧΑ
Last election	–	7.54%, 21 seats	0.29%, 0 seats
Seats won	33	26	21
Seat change	New	▲5	▲21
Popular vote	671,324	536,105	440,966
Percentage	10.62%	8.48%	6.97%
Swing	New	▲0.94pp	▲6.68pp
	Seventh party
Leader	Fotis Kouvelis
Party	DIMAR
Last election	–
Seats won	19
Seat change	New
Popular vote	386,394
Percentage	6.11%
Swing	New
- Results by constituency
Prime Minister before election
Lucas Papademos
Independent
Interim Prime Minister after election
Panayiotis Pikrammenos
Independent

Parliamentary elections were held in Greece on Sunday, 6 May 2012 to elect all 300 members to the Hellenic Parliament. It was scheduled to be held in late 2013, four years after the previous election; however, an early election was stipulated in the coalition agreement of November 2011 which formed the Papademos Cabinet. The coalition comprised both of Greece's traditional major political parties, PASOK on the left and New Democracy (ND) on the right, as well as the right-wing Popular Orthodox Rally (LAOS). The aim of the coalition was to relieve the Greek government-debt crisis by ratifying and implementing decisions taken with other Eurozone countries and the International Monetary Fund (IMF) a month earlier.

The elections delivered massive losses for the parties of the outgoing government, resulting in a realignment of Greek politics. PASOK, who won the 2009 election in a relative landslide, won just 13% of the overall vote, a decline of almost three-quarters. ND emerged in first place with just 19% of votes, approximately half of its previous result. LAOS lost all of its seats. Syriza, previously a minor party on the left-wing, ran on an anti-austerity platform and outpolled PASOK with 17% of the vote. The Communist Party of Greece (KKE) improved its performance to 8.5%. Three new parties entered Parliament in the election – the right-wing populist Independent Greeks (ANEL) won 11%, the far-right Golden Dawn (XA) 7%, and the Democratic Left (DIMAR) 6%.

New Democracy won a substantial plurality of 108 seats thanks to Greece's majority bonus, but ND and PASOK were the only pro-bailout parties present and now lacked a majority between them. Conversely, the anti-bailout parties were deeply divided between left and right. ND leader Antonis Samaras, Syriza's Alexis Tsipras, and PASOK's Evangelos Venizelos all tried and failed to put together governments in the days following the election. On 16 May, President Karolos Papoulias appointed Panayiotis Pikrammenos as caretaker Prime Minister and scheduled a new general election for 17 June.

== Background ==
The Euro area crisis and the Greek government-debt crisis, in particular, have led to an escalated political crisis. There was an announcement by Greek Prime Minister George Papandreou that a referendum would take place to determine whether Greece would accept the next bailout deal with the European Union, the IMF and the European Central Bank (ECB). However such a referendum never took place. The parties of the opposition and politicians from within the ruling PASOK subsequently demanded early elections.

At the same time, protests and strikes in Greece have been commonplace, with some turning violent. Social unrest in the country is the result of a series of austerity packages passed by the Greek parliament since 2010.

On 4 November 2011 there was a vote of confidence in Parliament, narrowly won by the government of George Papandreou by a vote of 153 to 145 in the 300-seat body. Although a number of PASOK MPs said they would not support the government in the vote of confidence, all 152 eventually did support the government after PASOK's leader Papandreou agreed to step down as Prime Minister in order for a government of national unity to take over. Following the vote of confidence one previously expelled PASOK member was re-admitted to the party, raising the Papandreou majority to 153 seats. Despite the narrow victory, Papandreou eventually resigned a few days later, making way for a three-party "grand coalition" caretaker government under Lucas Papademos, a former ECB vice president, with the support of PASOK, ND and LAOS. However, LAOS later resigned over further austerity measures.

=== Procedure ===
Voting is mandatory; however none of the legally existing penalties or sanctions have ever been enforced. 250 seats were distributed on the basis of proportional representation, with a threshold of 3% required for entry into parliament. The other 50 seats were awarded to the party or coalition that wins a plurality of votes, according to the election law. Parliamentary majority is achieved by a party or coalition of parties that command at least one half plus one (151 out of 300) of total seats. Blank and invalid votes, as well as votes cast for parties that fall short of the 3% threshold, are disregarded for seat allocation purposes.

== Date ==
In a speech to parliament on 4 November, Evangelos Venizelos said that the caretaker government would last until February. In late December 2011, it was decided that the election would be pushed back to late April, in order to allow the technocrat government to pass austerity measures.

== Incumbent parliament ==
Five parties were elected at the 2009 election, but during the course of the parliament changes in party memberships (mostly due to the February 2012 expulsions from the main two parties of representatives who would not vote for the loan agreement), resulted in representation for a further two official parties (parties with more than 10 MPs) and two parliamentary caucuses (i.e. smaller parties). An additional 18 members sat as independents. Leaders of official parties enjoy certain privileges that permit them equal footing to one another and to the prime minister, both in parliamentary procedure and in pre-election debating; such privileges are not extended to caucuses and independents.

Distribution of seats in parliament	2009 election	April 2012
Official parties
PASOK	160	129
New Democracy (ND)	91	72
Communist Party of Greece (KKE)	21	21
Popular Orthodox Rally (LAOS)	15	16
Syriza	13	11
Independent Greeks (ANEL)	0	10
Democratic Left (DIMAR)	0	10
Parliamentary caucuses and independents
Social Agreement (KOISY)	0	8
Democratic Alliance (DISY)	0	4
Independents	0	19

== Participating parties ==
A total of 31 parties participated in the election:

1. PASOK, Evangelos Venizelos
2. New Democracy (ND), Antonis Samaras
3. Communist Party of Greece (KKE), Aleka Papariga
4. Coalition of the Radical Left – Unitary Social Movement (SYRIZA), Alexis Tsipras
5. Popular Orthodox Rally (LAOS), Georgios Karatzaferis
6. Democratic Alliance (DISY), Dora Bakoyannis
7. Social Agreement (KOISY), Louka Katseli
8. Independent Greeks (ANEL), Panos Kammenos
9. Democratic Left (DIMAR), Fotis Kouvelis
10. Action – Liberal Alliance (DRASI-FS), Stefanos Manos and Grigoris Vallianatos
11. Ecologists Greens (OP), six-member committee
12. Union of Centrists (EK), Vassilis Leventis
13. Liberal party (LIBERTAS), Manolis Kaligiannis
14. Golden Dawn (XA), Nikolaos Michaloliakos
15. No: The coalition of Democratic Revival and United Popular Front (EPAM), Stelios Papathemelis and 3-member committee
16. I Don't Pay Movement, Vasilis Papadopoulos
17. Communist Party of Greece (Marxist-Leninist) / Marxist-Leninist Communist Party of Greece (KKE(M–L) / ML KKE), four-member committee
18. Front of the Greek Anticapitalist Left (ANTARSYA), 21-member committee
19. Organisation of Communist Internationalists of Greece (OKDE), 3-member committee
20. Workers Revolutionary Party (EEK), Savas Matsas
21. Organisation for the Reconstruction of the Communist Party of Greece (OAKKE), 3-member committee
22. National Unity Association (SEE), Nikos Alikakos
23. Society – Political Party of the Successors of Kapodistrias, Michail Iliadis
24. Pirate Party of Greece (KPE), Ioannis Panagopoulos
25. Recreate Greece (DX), Thanos Tzimeros
26. Panathinaikos Movement (PANKI), Yiorgos Betsikas
27. Dignity, alliance of independent candidates, Panayiotis Theodoropoulos
28. Greek Ecologists, Dimosthenis Vergis (sole candidate)
29. National Resistance Movement (KEAN), Ippokratis Savvouras (sole candidate)
30. Renewing Independent Left, Renewing Right, Renewing Pasok, Renewing New Democracy, No to War, Party of Action, I Give Away Land, I Pardon Debts, I Save Lives, Panagrarian Labour Movement of Greece (PAEKE), Miltiadis Tzalazidis (sole perennial candidate)
31. Regional Urban Development (PAA), Nikos Kolitsis (sole candidate)

Four other parties were banned by the Supreme Court of Greece: National Hope, PAME in GESEEP, the Friends of Man and Citizens Assembly–(Direct) Democracy in Practice. National Hope was prohibited under the electoral law from participating as it is a monarchist party. The court also banned the one-man party Tyrannicides from contesting the election under that name, on the grounds that the title "demonstrated criminal intent." The party's Athanasios Daskalopoulos was however allowed to run in the election as independent candidate, on equal terms with the 51 other approved independent candidates.

On 18 March, PASOK held a leadership election in which Finance Minister Evangelos Venizelos was the sole candidate.

In order to provide voters with a quick unbiased tool, to check into what degree the voters personal answer in a political survey compared with the answers by the political parties, a joint academic non-profit group of researchers from Aristotle University of Thessaloniki and four other International universities, developed this free to use internet application Choose4Greece.

== Campaign ==
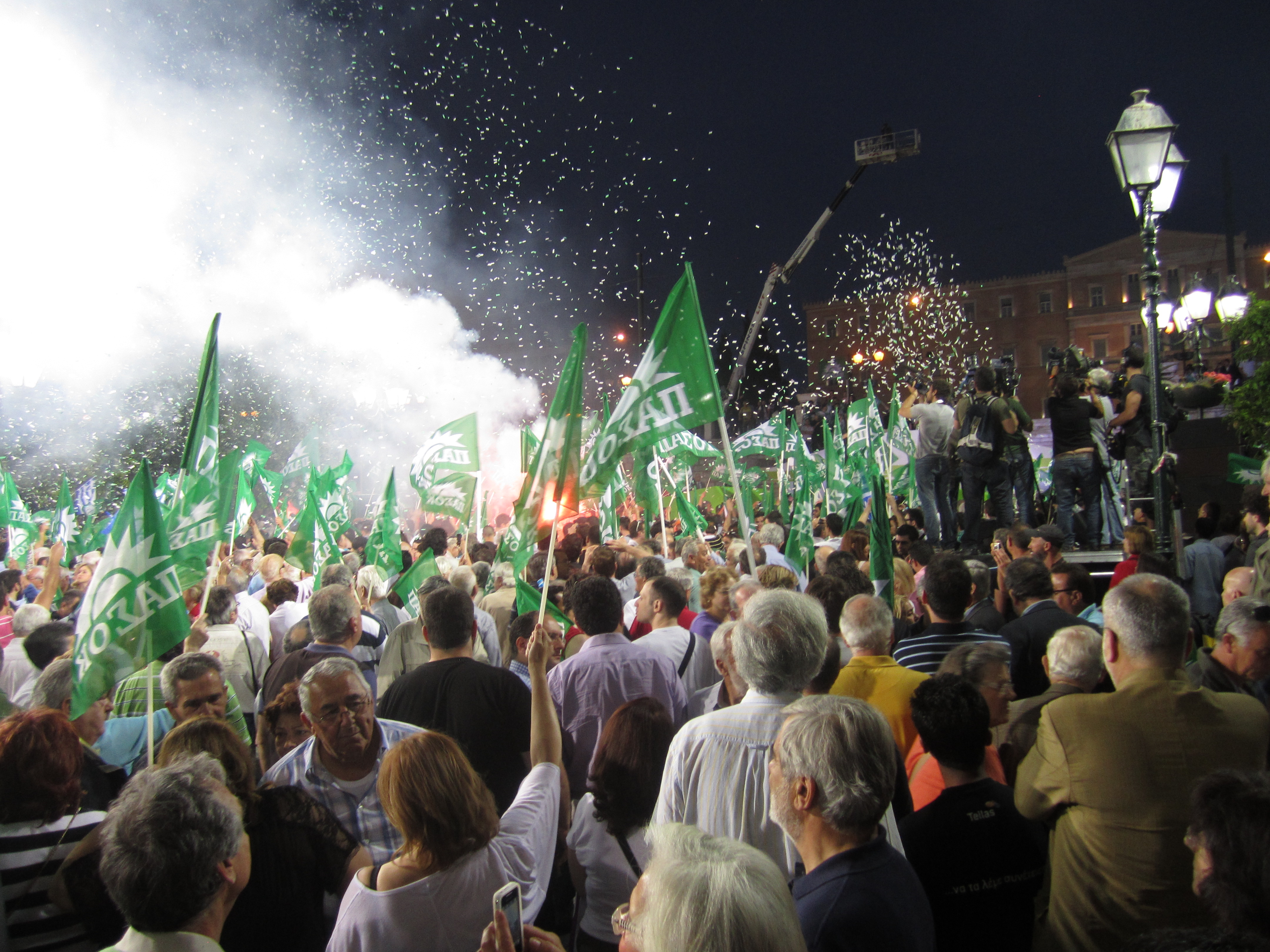
A PASOK rally in Athens, May 2012

Among the 12 biggest political parties in the opinion polls, the parties that would continue the austerity programme were PASOK, New Democracy, DISY (Democratic Alliance) and DRASI (Liberal Alliance).

There was also criticism of the German-led austerity programmes. Golden Dawn's campaign also called for the placement of land mines on the border with Turkey, the revocation of eurozone loan agreements, nationalisation of banks that received state loans and the nationalisation of natural resources. It was also said to have gained support by organising patrols in high-crime neighbourhoods (a similar tactic to Jobbik, who gained entry into the Hungarian parliament for the first time). In turn PASOK and New Democracy also ratcheted up rhetoric against illegal immigration, while New Democracy feared further loss of votes to opponents of the austerity measures. LAOS, in turn, called for immigrants to be sent to uninhabited islands.

KKE leader Aleka Papariga said that Greece should leave both the eurozone and the EU. ND's Antonis Samaras doubted the ability to create a "grand coalition" with PASOK. The Ecogreens' Yiannis Paraskevopoulos said the prime issue for them was the economy and the direction of the country. Independent Greeks' Panos Kammenos said that Germany was too dominant and criticised the austerity measures he said were dictated to Greece. SYRIZA's Alexis Tsipras said that he was open to working with Independent Greeks or anyone who supported a left-wing government. LAOS's Georgios Karatzaferis, who left the interim government midway through its "mandate," criticised ND and PASOK for their "betrayal," saying that "they depend their political survival on foreign power centres by accepting English law for [Greece's] bonds. This land is governed by Reichenbach," while he justified his initial decision to join the interim government by saying: "I am not the first choice of the Americans and the troika. It's only natural for me to be put under pressure." He also criticised a new initiative against illegal immigration as lax, in what was read as a move to gain back credibility from Golden Dawn.

=== Controversy ===
At a campaign rally in the Athenian suburb of Maroussi on 21 April, PASOK's Evangelos Venizelos said that "parliament cannot become a reception space for the followers of Nazism and fascism." In response, some Golden Dawn supporters were reported to have thrown bottles and other objects at him.

== Other events ==
Ahead of the election, the financial markets started to price in the risk that the election could result in a new government led by parties seeking to reverse the austerity measures. Due to the risk factor, the yield for the new 10-year Greek government bond rose from 18.1% on 15 March to 22.3% on 10 April, at a time when opinion polls predicted the election would result in a new anti-austerity government. On 27 April, the yields slightly recovered to 20.6%, when opinion polls started to show that the election could result in an austerity friendly government. Less than a week before the election Standard & Poor's increased the Greek sovereign debt rating by a notch above default.

The Bank of Greece made an unusual political statement on 24 April when it claimed that the economic recovery depends upon a "strict adherence to the economic reforms and fiscal adjustment commitments Greece has agreed with its eurozone partners." It claimed that choosing a different path would only lead to a worsening of the recession. The central bank called on citizens and the political system to undertake "the historic responsibility of choice" and asked for "the greatest possible consensus" in society and in the political sphere when deciding if Greece should stay in the eurozone by applying the agreement with Greece’s creditors or to drop out. It warned that Greece’s eurozone membership was at stake if Greece failed to follow through on its pledges after the election.

== Opinion polls ==
Local regression trend line of poll results from 4 October 2009 to 6 May 2012, with each line corresponding to a political party.

Surveys carried out since 2009 showed a sharp decline in support for the two major parties, PASOK and New Democracy, with PASOK, the sole ruling party until 2011, seeing the largest losses in support. Polling numbers for LAOS, having risen until late 2011, declined in the run up to the next election, while support for previously minor left-wing parties as well as the new, right-wing ANEL party seemed to surge. The poll by VPRC in January 2012 featured PASOK in fifth place, the first time in over thirty years that the party was not amongst the top two; however by April 2012 it had returned to second place in the polls. Golden Dawn, an extreme right party, was set to enter parliament for the first time, capturing traditional LAOS voters after their support fell when they joined the interim governing coalition.

According to Greek law, opinion polls may not be published in the last two weeks preceding an election.

== Results ==
Results, showing the seats won by each party in each electoral district.

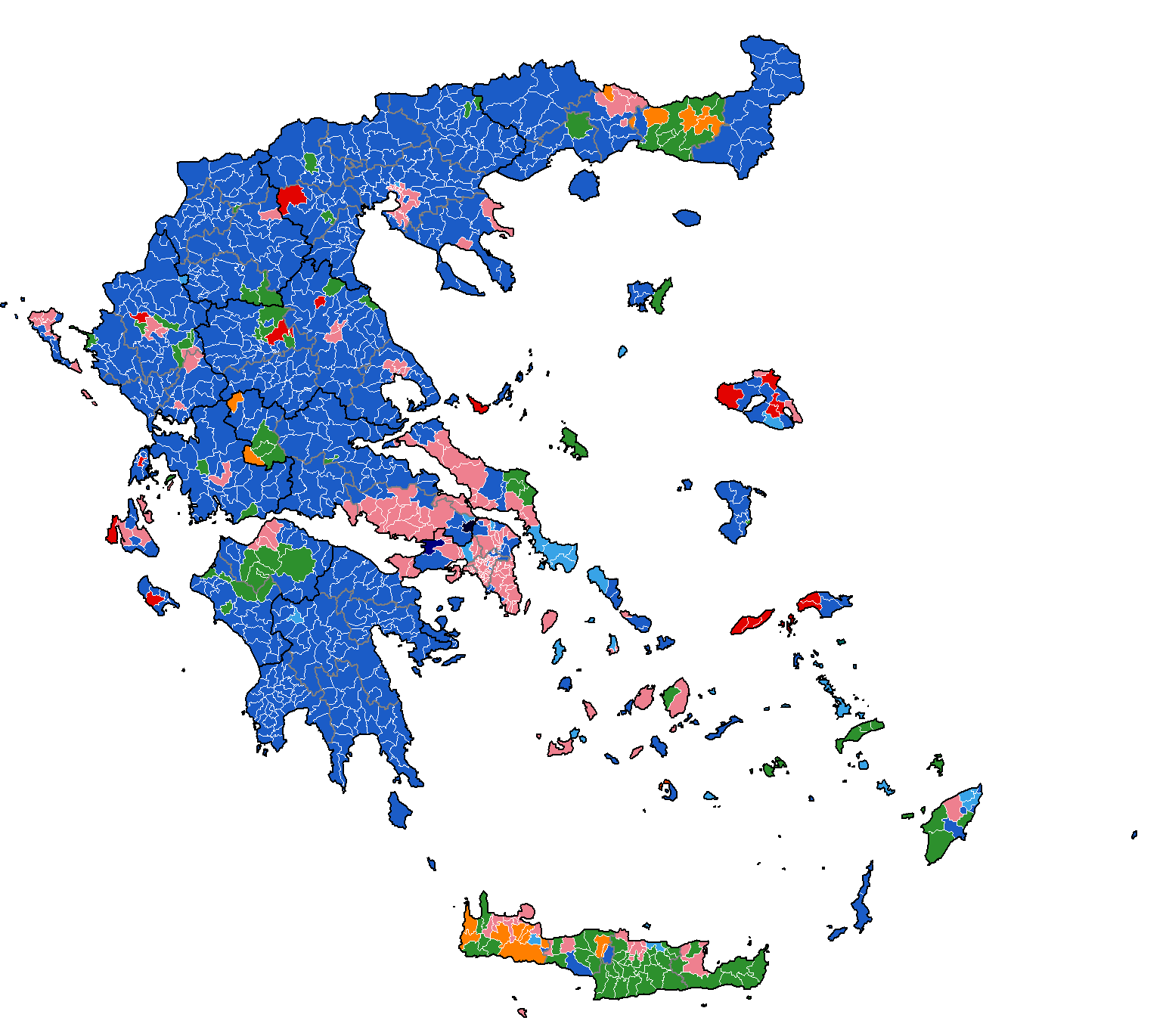
Results, showing the winning party in each municipal unit. ND (657) SYRIZA (200) PASOK (101) ANEL (27) KKE (18) DISY (17) XA (1) DIMAR (1) LAOS (1) KOISY (1)

Results, showing the winning party in each precinct. ND (4127) PASOK (1334) SYRIZA (1056) KKE (292) ANEL (161) DISY (148) DIMAR (34) XA (31) LAOS (9) KOISY (7) OP (4) DIXA (1) ANTARSYA (1) DIMAN–EPAM (1) KKE M-L–M-L KKE (1)

Party	Votes	%	+/–	Seats	+/–
New Democracy	1,192,103	18.85	–14.62	108	+17
Syriza	1,061,928	16.79	+12.19	52	+39
PASOK	833,452	13.18	–30.74	41	–119
Independent Greeks	671,324	10.62	New	33	New
Communist Party of Greece	536,105	8.48	+0.94	26	+5
Popular Association–Golden Dawn	440,966	6.97	+6.68	21	+21
Democratic Left	386,394	6.11	New	19	New
Ecologist Greens	185,485	2.93	+0.40	0	0
Popular Orthodox Rally	182,925	2.89	–2.74	0	–15
Democratic Alliance	161,550	2.55	New	0	New
Recreate Greece	135,960	2.15	New	0	New
Drassi–Liberal Alliance	114,066	1.80	New	0	New
Antarsya	75,416	1.19	+0.83	0	0
Social Agreement	60,552	0.96	New	0	New
No (EPAM–DIMAN)	58,170	0.92	+0.47	0	0
I Don't Pay Movement	55,590	0.88	New	0	New
Union of Centrists	38,313	0.61	+0.34	0	0
National Unity Association	38,286	0.61	New	0	New
Pirate Party of Greece	32,519	0.51	–0.28	0	0
Society	28,514	0.45	+0.29	0	0
Marxist–Leninist Communist Parties (KKE (m-l)–M-L KKE)	16,010	0.25	+0.02	0	0
Workers Revolutionary Party	6,074	0.10	+0.03	0	0
Liberal Party	3,618	0.06	New	0	New
Organisation for the Reconstruction of the KKE	2,565	0.04	+0.02	0	0
Organisation of Internationalist Communists	1,783	0.03	New	0	New
Dignity	799	0.01	New	0	New
National Resistance Movement	335	0.01	New	0	New
Panagrarian Labour Movement of Greece	302	0.00	–0.02	0	0
Panathinaikos Movement	18	0.00	New	0	New
Greek Ecologists	3	0.00	–0.29	0	0
Regional Urban Development	3	0.00	New	0	New
Independents	3,008	0.05	+0.05	0	0
Total	6,324,136	100.00	–	300	0
Valid votes	6,324,136	97.64			
Invalid/blank votes	152,682	2.36			
Total votes	6,476,818	100.00			
Registered voters/turnout	9,945,859	65.12			
Source: Ministry of Interior

=== Parties' Performances ===
New Democracy's vote share	Communist Party's vote share	Golden Dawn's vote share	Democratic Alliance's vote share

=== By region ===
Constituency	ND		SYRIZA		PASOK		ANEL		KKE		XA		DIMAR		OP		LAOS		DISY		DIXA		Action	
Constituency	%	S	%	S	%	S	%	S	%	S	%	S	%	S	%	S	%	S	%	S	%	S	%	S
Attica	13.15	28	21.03	17	8.91	7	11.36	10	9.45	8	7.92	8	6.20	7	3.32	–	3.04	–	2.08	–	3.32	–	3.07	–
C. Greece	18.38	6	17.35	3	13.53	2	12.12	2	7.79	1	7.83	2	5.72	1	2.56	–	3.14	–	2.87	–	1.48	–	1.10	–
C. Macedonia	21.49	17	13.64	7	13.56	7	11.49	7	8.16	4	7.22	3	6.50	3	2.62	–	3.54	–	1.53	–	1.77	–	1.64	–
Crete	10.11	7	15.81	3	18.54	3	11.09	1	6.18	1	3.09	–	7.94	1	4.27	–	1.98	–	10.12	–	2.36	–	1.02	–
E. Macedonia	24.09	8	12.64	3	18.36	4	9.57	2	5.30	–	5.40	–	5.07	–	2.20	–	3.03	–	5.46	–	1.64	–	0.87	–
Epirus	25.01	5	17.57	3	16.43	2	7.75	–	8.43	1	4.81	–	5.37	–	2.20	–	2.05	–	2.28	–	1.16	–	1.19	–
Ionian	19.64	3	18.24	2	12.79	–	7.82	–	13.37	1	6.95	–	5.11	–	2.95	–	2.01	–	1.40	–	1.32	–	1.93	–
N. Aegean	19.77	2	13.58	1	14.57	1	9.86	–	16.01	2	4.63	–	6.38	–	3.49	–	2.46	–	1.44	–	0.92	–	1.07	–
Peloponnese	28.33	7	13.43	5	14.81	4	7.93	–	6.12	–	9.59	2	4.94	–	2.37	–	2.69	–	1.27	–	1.62	–	1.24	–
S. Aegean	18.10	4	13.60	1	14.63	1	15.81	2	6.16	–	6.20	–	7.06	–	3.88	–	2.28	–	1.82	–	2.00	–	1.03	–
Thessaly	22.91	8	14.69	2	13.92	2	9.53	2	10.42	4	6.05	2	6.34	3	2.60	–	3.09	–	1.70	–	1.75	–	0.95	–
W. Greece	21.02	6	18.07	4	16.14	3	8.45	3	7.91	2	7.21	3	5.62	2	2.82	–	2.20	–	1.69	–	1.22	–	1.17	–
W. Macedonia	25.99	4	13.41	–	15.22	2	10.48	2	8.07	1	6.02	–	5.77	1	2.34	–	2.61	–	1.66	–	1.18	–	1.11	–
Greece	18.85	3	16.79	2	13.18	2	10.62	2	8.48	1	6.97	1	6.11	1	2.93	–	2.89	–	2.55	–	2.15	–	1.80	–

=== By constituency ===
Results of each party by region (%)
Constituency	ND	SYRIZA	PASOK	ANEL	KKE	XA	DIMAR	OP	LAOS	DISY	DIXA	DRASI
Achaea	17.54	21.82	14.11	8.84	7.91	6.32	5.83	3.46	2.69	1.42	1.41	1.23
Aetolia-Akarnania	24.11	15.34	16.95	7.52	8.52	7.92	5.45	2.11	1.75	2.18	0.96	1.39
Argolida	28.42	12.80	13.90	8.03	5.91	9.90	5.68	2.54	2.00	1.68	1.61	1.42
Arkadia	25.60	14.65	16.08	9.10	6.73	7.78	5.36	2.19	3.20	1.20	1.71	1.48
Arta	28.28	21.67	14.41	7.03	8.43	4.50	3.84	1.64	1.43	2.73	0.91	0.57
Athens A	15.79	19.12	9.71	8.98	8.58	8.77	5.99	3.08	3.19	2.49	3.37	4.35
Athens B	12.40	21.82	9.07	11.01	9.64	6.71	6.60	3.45	2.78	2.05	3.77	3.44
Attica	13.71	19.40	8.24	13.53	8.71	9.70	5.33	3.03	3.66	2.29	3.02	2.47
Boeotia	14.78	19.41	11.96	11.96	9.12	8.20	6.70	2.53	2.67	3.28	1.55	1.20
Cephalonia	18.03	18.88	11.71	7.98	15.03	7.87	4.37	2.47	1.95	1.29	1.80	1.47
Chalkidiki	23.16	14.51	15.83	12.90	5.88	6.36	5.95	2.17	2.77	1.85	1.24	1.02
Chania	8.44	17.19	13.92	9.93	7.47	4.28	6.81	4.91	2.76	13.40	1.48	0.86
Chios	24.16	10.89	18.78	7.14	7.23	4.19	9.31	4.64	3.34	1.66	1.05	1.74
Corfu	18.30	19.40	11.84	8.95	12.82	7.27	5.66	3.49	2.18	1.38	1.07	0.97
Corinthia	21.22	14.69	15.43	9.23	4.48	11.99	5.52	2.91	2.90	1.43	1.74	1.34
Cyclades	17.41	17.15	11.25	12.93	6.46	6.30	8.63	3.12	2.52	2.12	2.96	1.46
Dodecanese	18.57	11.13	16.99	17.81	5.95	6.13	5.96	4.41	2.12	1.62	1.34	0.73
Drama	25.68	9.97	17.75	12.20	4.96	5.09	5.83	2.50	3.41	2.05	2.26	1.27
Elis	23.00	15.10	18.70	9.05	7.02	7.85	5.50	2.66	1.96	1.50	1.26	0.76
Euboea	14.51	18.53	12.80	13.80	8.29	8.58	6.15	2.71	4.21	1.66	1.38	1.05
Evros	28.75	7.38	18.55	11.16	5.33	6.09	5.03	2.31	3.54	2.81	1.22	0.79
Evrytania	20.96	12.22	18.99	6.23	4.14	4.19	5.31	1.80	1.53	18.28	1.12	0.90
Florina	29.59	13.16	16.34	9.06	7.98	5.61	4.69	2.38	2.29	1.70	0.99	0.82
Grevena	27.00	10.32	19.48	7.10	10.78	5.61	5.92	2.07	2.61	2.02	1.04	0.88
Imathia	21.39	12.98	16.42	12.45	9.02	7.70	5.96	2.12	3.13	1.22	0.94	0.90
Ioannina	22.90	17.61	16.21	7.80	8.66	4.23	5.90	2.48	2.45	2.50	1.40	1.49
Heraklion	9.13	15.90	19.23	12.82	6.47	2.63	9.31	4.25	1.71	8.11	2.56	0.91
Karditsa	27.86	14.30	15.17	9.35	9.90	6.02	4.37	2.13	2.13	1.79	1.21	0.66
Kastoria	29.77	11.20	12.87	13.59	5.26	7.56	3.95	1.35	2.86	1.69	1.52	1.54
Kavala	24.11	14.26	16.50	10.46	6.59	6.99	5.53	2.73	2.99	1.18	1.98	0.99
Kilkis	26.62	10.65	15.02	9.49	9.75	8.18	5.42	2.20	3.21	1.52	1.05	0.76
Kozani	23.26	14.99	14.53	10.80	8.34	5.76	6.70	2.72	2.65	1.54	1.17	1.12
Laconia	32.88	10.85	15.38	8.08	5.98	10.19	3.75	1.93	2.41	1.24	1.71	1.13
Larissa	21.05	14.13	14.26	9.83	10.98	6.05	6.33	3.04	4.03	1.50	1.68	1.17
Lasithi	14.09	13.97	23.10	8.42	4.53	2.67	6.65	3.92	1.72	8.47	3.98	2.07
Lefkada	25.25	16.03	13.99	6.78	13.21	5.55	4.35	2.36	1.35	1.05	1.69	1.22
Lesvos	18.63	14.69	13.53	11.85	16.79	4.66	5.50	3.33	2.13	1.59	0.83	0.79
Magnesia	20.12	18.00	9.92	10.75	9.57	7.01	5.99	2.71	3.03	1.39	2.81	0.83
Messenia	33.60	13.33	13.74	5.99	7.33	8.16	4.41	2.14	2.72	0.94	1.42	0.95
Pella	27.16	9.97	18.85	9.77	6.10	7.58	6.52	2.14	3.13	1.21	1.32	0.80
Phocis	22.33	14.56	13.23	12.85	8.72	7.31	4.91	2.19	2.18	1.44	2.02	1.59
Phthiotis	24.57	15.85	14.85	10.79	6.48	7.31	4.74	2.60	2.59	2.15	1.48	1.00
Pieria	27.19	9.68	16.00	12.36	7.09	6.70	6.38	1.98	3.72	1.48	0.96	1.36
Piraeus A	16.65	19.16	8.60	12.55	7.66	8.88	6.11	3.35	3.29	1.78	2.76	1.95
Piraeus B	9.77	23.85	8.16	12.40	12.29	9.49	5.87	3.51	3.02	1.44	1.64	0.80
Preveza	26.40	15.10	16.87	8.05	9.67	5.94	5.43	2.10	1.74	1.79	0.95	0.82
Rethymno	13.06	14.58	20.37	9.47	4.24	2.98	6.24	3.52	1.77	12.87	1.77	0.76
Rhodope	18.26	9.40	26.71	5.43	4.52	3.74	3.87	1.45	2.46	17.95	1.34	0.53
Samos	17.15	14.27	11.90	8.52	24.73	5.08	4.90	2.50	2.15	0.82	0.95	0.89
Serres	30.06	9.15	15.94	10.69	6.13	6.77	4.80	2.51	3.57	1.89	1.32	1.05
Thesprotia	24.80	13.85	19.93	8.39	6.06	5.84	6.05	2.30	2.15	1.41	1.06	1.67
Thessaloniki A	14.81	17.46	10.42	11.57	9.31	6.91	7.45	3.25	3.73	1.66	2.56	2.48
Thessaloniki B	20.01	14.42	11.23	12.04	8.85	7.85	6.81	2.61	3.87	1.32	2.08	1.95
Trikala	25.23	11.97	17.13	7.62	10.94	4.90	8.60	2.09	2.32	2.36	1.08	0.94
Xanthi	21.82	24.13	12.49	7.73	4.70	4.30	5.01	1.83	2.56	5.50	1.46	0.80
Zakynthos	21.04	16.03	15.60	5.38	13.18	6.11	4.98	2.45	2.06	1.78	1.23	5.47

=== Seat allocation with the current system ===
The seat allocation for the May 2012 election was done using the 2007-2019 system, which granted a 50-seat bonus for the winning party. Had the seats been allocated using the current system, New Democracy would have lost all of the bonus seats, as it received less than 25% of the public vote. Had New Democracy not gotten the 50-seat bonus, the seats by region would have been allocated as following:

Region	ND		SYRIZA		PASOK		ANEL		KKE		XA		DIMAR	
Region	S	±	S	±	S	±	S	±	S	±	S	±	S	±
Attica	19	▼9	22	▲5	9	▲2	11	▲1	9	▲1	8	0	7	0
Central Greece	3	▼3	2	▼1	3	▲1	3	▲1	2	▲1	3	▲1	1	0
Central Macedonia	12	▼5	7	0	8	▲1	7	0	5	▲1	5	▲2	4	▲1
Crete	2	▼5	4	▲1	5	▲2	2	▲1	1	0	–	0	2	▲1
Eastern Macedonia and Thrace	4	▼4	4	▲1	5	▲1	3	▲1	–	0	1	▲1	–	0
Epirus	4	▼1	2	▼1	2	0	1	▲1	1	0	–	0	1	▲1
Ionian Islands	3	0	2	0	–	0	–	0	1	0	–	0	–	0
North Aegean	2	0	1	0	1	0	–	0	2	0	–	0	–	0
Peloponnese	4	▼3	5	0	5	▲1	1	▲1	1	▲1	2	0	–	0
South Aegean	1	▼3	2	▲1	1	0	2	0	–	0	1	▲1	1	▲1
Thessaly	5	▼3	4	▲2	3	▲1	2	0	4	0	2	0	3	0
Western Greece	4	▼2	5	▲1	3	0	3	0	3	▲1	3	0	2	0
Western Macedonia	4	0	–	0	2	0	2	0	1	0	–	0	1	0
Greece	3	0	2	0	2	0	2	0	1	0	1	0	1	0
Total	70	▼38	62	▲10	49	▲8	39	▲6	31	▲5	26	▲5	23	▲4

== Reactions ==
ND's Antonis Samaras said "I understand the rage of the people, but our party will not leave Greece ungoverned." Golden Dawn's Nikolaos Michaloliakos told his party supporters that "Europe of the nations returns, Greece is only the beginning" amid applaud and chants of "Greece belongs to Greeks." He also told the media: "The resistance of Golden Dawn against the bailout dictators will continue. Inside and outside the Greek parliament. We will continue the battle for Greece. Free from the international speculators. For a proud and independent Greece. For Greece without the bailout slavery and the loss of our national sovereignty."

The absence of a parliamentary majority was highlighted as a reason of concern. Financial analysts expressed their opinion that the poor result of the parties that had supported the austerity measures and neo-liberal economic policies would be detrimental for financial markets. The financial markets reacted negatively, with some opinions being expressed that Greece could withdraw from the eurozone before the end of 2013. The Athex fell by a record 10% during the first hours of the trading day after the election. At the close of the first trading day after the election, Athex had slightly recovered to a decline of 6.7%, while the yield for 10-year government bond rose from 20.6% to 23.0%. Following the failure of ND to form a government, European financial markets fell, as well as U.S. futures markets. U.S. stock indices also fell as a result. As a result of the failure to form a government five days later, following both ND and SYRIZA's attempts, U.S. financial markets continued to slide. After two failed attempts to form governments, Trevor Williams, the chief economist at Lloyds TSB said that the markets were beginning to factor in a Greek withdrawal from the eurozone. This observation was at the same time also confirmed by a Bloomberg poll, as it showed 57% of investors now expected Greece would leave the euro in 2012. Four days after the election, the Athex general index had declined 10.8%, while yields for the 10-year government bond had increased from 20.6% to 24.7%. Over the course of the next eight days following successive failed attempts at government formation, stock markets in Europe and elsewhere fell, while sovereign bond yields in Italy and Spain also rose amid fears of a renewed crisis within the eurozone.

- European Union - The President of the European Parliament Martin Schulz said that "the negotiations to form a government in Athens should have as a target the honouring of the country's obligations towards the European Union." Though he also said that the events in both Greece and other eurozone states indicate a need for a policy package in order to enhance growth and job creations.

A European Commission spokesman said that it had "hopes and expects that the future government of Greece will respect the engagements that Greece has entered into."

- Germany - German Chancellor Angela Merkel said that Greece alone should determine a possible coalition government and that Germany would work with any democratically elected government, while insisting on the continuation of the bailout measures. Foreign Minister Guido Westerwelle added that Greece should continue to honour its obligations by cutting public deficits and that "we expect the formation of prudence government in Greece, with a clear European orientation." He added that Berlin will discuss this possibility with Athens. After the failure of the first attempt to form a government he said that "we call on the authorities in Greece to quickly move toward stability so that a government of reason can be formed. [The developments are viewed] with great concern. It’s important for us that the steps that have been agreed upon with the government be implemented. They are not up for negotiation.
  - Bundestag Alliance 90/The Greens leader Jürgen Trittin reacted to the result in saying that it was a "clear vote that Europe should not lose its social equilibrium" and "this was the end of Mercozi, [sic] a good day for Europe and a bad day for Merkel."
- Sweden - Finance Minister Anders Borg said that "it is of course of central importance to underline that they must uphold the direction of fiscal policy. They must continue to uphold the measures they have pledged in the programmes."

Local media reactions included Imerisia's headline "Country in Limbo" and Ta Nea's "Nightmare of Ungovernability."

== Analysis ==
New Democracy won most districts of the Greek countryside, winning in its traditional strongholds of Macedonia and Peloponnese. However, 19% of the vote for New Democracy is an all-time low for the party, down from its previous all-time low of 33% which occurred in the previous election in 2009. SYRIZA won the highest number of votes in most urban areas, including Athens and Thessaloniki. This is the first time since the election of 1977 that a party besides New Democracy or PASOK finished as one of the top two parties. PASOK, who have spent 21 years in government on-and-off since 1981, suffered their worst defeat since 1974, reduced to just 13% of the vote. PASOK finished in first place in four prefectures: Heraklion, Lasithi, Rethymno, and Rhodope. It has been suggested that Syriza's sudden success depended on PASOK joining the right-wing pro-austerity coalition and Syriza convincing voters that it was "the only 'true' leftist party" which unlike their rivals would actively renegotiate the austerity terms.

Even though the Communist Party increased its share of the vote by almost 1% and increased its presence in the parliament by 5 seats, it finished outside of the top three for the first time since 1993. The Communist Party finished in first place in the Samos Prefecture. Far-right neo-nazi Golden Dawn entered parliament for the first time, while far-right LAOS lost all parliament seats after it joined the governing coalition.

== Government formation ==
As the election resulted in no single party with a majority of parliament seats, the Greek law stipulates a procedure, where the largest party first will be given a chance to negotiate a government formation within three days. Failing that, the second largest party will be given the chance within the next three days, and if this attempt also fails the third ranked party will get a further three days to try and form a government. If none of the three largest parties can succeed to form a government, the baton will be handed over to the president for a last neutral attempt. If the process fails, then another election will be called.

The day after the election, President Karolos Papoulias met with the leader of New Democracy Antonis Samaras to task him with the first attempt to form a government. On 8 May, Tsipras was tasked with forming a government within the stipulated three days by Papoulias at noon. At the same time the EU decided to continue with Greece's disbursements which meant sending US$5.4 billion on 10 May, but an additional US$1.29 billion was held back. As a result of the political imbroglio, both PASOK and ND suggested the EU and IMF agreement could have to be re-evaluated. If PASOK leader Venizelos failed Papoulias would make a final attempt to form a unity government. Venizelos met with Papoulias on 12 May to return his mandate.

On 12 May, an opinion poll showed that 72% of respondents felt that the parties must make mutual concessions and work together, 22.9% of them called for a new election. At the same time, 78.1% requested that the new government should do everything necessary in order to keep Greece within the eurozone.

The talks failed on 15 May, with an early election expected in June. A caretaker cabinet under Council of State president Panayiotis Pikrammenos was appointed on 16 May, and the election date announced to be scheduled for 17 June. The formal decrete to dissolve the newly elected parliament and call for new elections at 17 June, was jointly signed by the President of the Republic Karolos Papoulias and caretaker Prime Minister Panayiotis Pikrammenos at 19 May, to fully comply with the constitutional rule of calling for new elections within 30 days after having dissolved the parliament.

== See also ==
- List of members of the Hellenic Parliament, May–June 2012
