= National Unity Association =

National Unity Association Σύνδεσμος Εθνικής Ενότητας
- Leader: Nikos Alikakos
- Founded: 2011
- Ideology: Greek nationalism Conservatism
- Political position: Right-wing

Website
- www.syndesmosee.org

The National Unity Association (Greek: Σύνδεσμος Εθνικής Ενότητας, romanized: Sýndesmos Ethnikís Enótitas) is a Greek political party, founded by retired officers of the Hellenic Armed Forces. The president of the party is Anargyros Saripapas. Its ideology is social and romantic patriotism. It first participated in the May 2012 Greek legislative election.

== Electoral results ==
Results, 2012 (year links to election page)
Year	Type of Election	Votes	%	Mandates
May 2012	Parliament	38,286	0.61	0
May 2014	European Parliament	17,123	0.30	0
