= Opinion polling for the May 2012 Greek parliamentary election =

In the run up to the May 2012 Greek parliamentary election, various organizations carried out opinion polling to gauge voting intention in Greece during the term of the 13th Hellenic Parliament. Results of such polls are displayed in this article. The date range for these opinion polls is from the previous parliamentary election, held on 4 October 2009, to the days the next elections were held, on 6 May 2012.

Polls are listed in reverse chronological order, showing the most recent first and using the dates when the survey fieldwork was done, as opposed to the date of publication. Where the fieldwork dates are unknown, the date of publication is given instead. The highest percentage figure in each polling survey is displayed with its background shaded in the leading party's colour. If a tie ensues, this is applied to the figures with the highest percentages. The "Lead" columns on the right shows the percentage-point difference between the parties with the highest percentages in a given poll.

== Voting intention estimates ==
The tables below list nationwide voting intention estimates. Refusals are generally excluded from the party vote percentages, while question wording and the treatment of "don't know" responses and those not intending to vote may vary between polling organisations. Polls that show their results without disregarding those respondents who were undecided or said they would abstain from voting (either physically or by voting blank) have been re-calculated by disregarding these numbers from the totals offered through a simple rule of three, in order to obtain results comparable to other polls and the official election results. When available, seat projections are displayed below the percentages in a smaller font. 151 seats were required for an absolute majority in the Hellenic Parliament.

Graphical summary

Local regression trend line of poll results from 4 October 2009 to 6 May 2012, with each line corresponding to a political party.

Color key:

Poll conducted after legal ban on opinion polls Exit poll

| Polling firm/Commissioner | Fieldwork date | Sample size | PASOK | ND | KKE | LAOS | SYRIZA | OP | XA | DIMAR | DISY | PARMAP | ANEL | Lead |
|---|---|---|---|---|---|---|---|---|---|---|---|---|---|---|
| May 2012 parliamentary election | 6 May 2012 | —N/a | 13.2; 41 | 18.9; 108 | 8.5; 26 | 2.9; 0 | 16.8; 52 | 2.9; 0 | 7.0; 21 | 6.1; 19 | 2.6; 0 | (Note: Within ANEL.) | 10.6; 33 | 2.1 |
| Singular Logic (Note: Quick count.) | 6 May 2012 (21:45) | ? | 13.6; 42 | 19.2; 109 | 8.5; 26 | 2.9; 0 | 16.3; 50 | 2.9; 0 | 7.0; 22 | 6.0; 19 | 2.7; 0 | | 10.5; 32 | 2.9 |
| Metron–Alco–Marc–MRB–Opinion | 6 May 2012 (21:30) | 7,227 | 13.4; 38 | 19.7; 108 | 8.8; 25 | 3.1; 8 | 16.4; 47 | 3.1; 8 | 6.8; 19 | 6.0; 17 | 2.8; 0 | | 10.5; 30 | 3.3 |
| Metron–Alco–Marc–MRB–Opinion | 6 May 2012 (20:30) | 7,227 | 13.0– 14.0 | 19.0– 20.5 | 8.0– 9.5 | 2.7– 3.3 | 15.5– 17.0 | 2.7– 3.3 | 6.5– 7.5 | 5.5– 6.5 | 2.6– 3.1 | | 10.0– 11.0 | 3.5 |
| Kapa Research/To Vima | 6 May 2012 (19:00) | ? | 15.0– 18.0 | 16.0– 19.0 | 8.5– 10.0 | 2.5– 3.5 | 15.0– 18.0 | 2.5– 3.5 | 5.5– 7.5 | 4.5– 6.5 | 2.2– 3.2 | | 10.0– 12.0 | 1.0 |
| Metron–Alco–Marc–MRB–Opinion | 6 May 2012 (19:00) | 7,227 | 14.0– 17.0 | 17.0– 20.0 | 7.5– 9.5 | 2.5– 3.5 | 15.5– 18.5 | 2.5– 3.5 | 6.0– 8.0 | 4.5– 6.5 | 2.0– 2.8 | | 10.0– 12.0 | 1.5 |
| VPRC/tvxs | 4 May 2012 | ? | 11.5– 15.0 | 19.5– 22.0 | 9.7– 11.5 | 2.5– 3.5 | 15.0– 17.5 | 3.3– 4.0 | 3.8– 5.5 | 5.8– 7.7 | 2.1– 2.9 | | 9.0– 11.0 | 4.5 |
| Public Issue | 2 May 2012 | ? | 13.0– 17.0; 37/48 | 20.5– 24.5; 108/120 | 7.5– 10.5; 21/30 | 2.0– 4.0; 0/8 | 14.0– 18.0; 40/51 | 2.0– 4.0; 0/8 | 5.0– 8.0; 14/23 | 6.0– 9.0; 17/26 | 1.0– 3.0; 0/8 | | 7.0– 10.0; 20/28 | 6.5 |
| GPO/Mega TV | 20 Apr 2012 | ? | 19.5 | 25.6 | 10.7 | 4.7 | 9.8 | 3.1 | 5.5 | 7.9 | 3.5 | | 9.7 | 6.1 |
| Marc/Alpha TV | 18–20 Apr 2012 | 1,122 | 17.9; 48 | 22.7; 110 | 9.0; 24 | 3.9; 10 | 11.8; 31 | 3.2; 9 | 4.8; 13 | 8.4; 22 | 3.0; 8 | | 9.5; 25 | 4.8 |
| VPRC/Kontra Channel | 17–20 Apr 2012 | ? | 14.0 | 23.0 | 11.5 | 3.0 | 13.5 | 3.0 | 6.5 | 8.0 | 1.5 | | 8.5 | 9.0 |
| Metron Analysis/Crisis Monitor | 18–19 Apr 2012 | 1,185 | 15.1 | 20.1 | 9.9 | 3.8 | 11.0 | 4.3 | 6.2 | 8.8 | 2.7 | | 10.3 | 5.0 |
| Kapa Research/Ta Nea | 18–19 Apr 2012 | ? | 19.1 | 25.5 | 10.6 | 4.0 | 9.1 | 3.6 | 5.2 | 5.4 | 3.8 | | 7.7 | 6.4 |
| MRB/Real.gr | 18–19 Apr 2012 | 1,007 | 14.5 | 23.0 | 9.8 | 3.1 | 11.9 | 4.0 | 5.7 | 8.2 | 3.0 | | 9.3 | 8.5 |
| Rass/Eleftheros Typos | 17–19 Apr 2012 | 1,203 | 17.1 | 24.1 | 8.7 | 3.4 | 10.3 | 3.8 | 4.3 | 8.4 | 3.2 | | 9.4 | 7.0 |
| Marc/Ethnos | 17–19 Apr 2012 | 1,001 | 17.8; 47 | 21.9; 108 | 9.2; 24 | 4.2; 11 | 11.0; 29 | 3.2; 8 | 5.2; 14 | 8.8; 23 | 3.0; 8 | | 10.4; 28 | 4.1 |
| Alco/NewsIT | 17–19 Apr 2012 | 1,000 | 16.5 | 23.0 | 8.7 | 3.7 | 9.8 | 3.3 | 4.8 | 8.2 | 2.9 | | 10.3 | 6.5 |
| Public Issue/Skai–Kathimerini | 17–19 Apr 2012 | 1,310 | 14.0; 34/42 | 21.5; 104/112 | 11.0; 27/33 | 3.0; 8/11 | 13.0; 33/38 | 3.5; 8/12 | 5.5; 11/19 | 9.5; 21/30 | 2.0; 0 | | 11.0; 24/35 | 7.5 |
| Pulse RC/To Pontiki | 11–17 Apr 2012 | 1,209 | 15.0; 41 | 22.0; 110 | 10.5; 29 | 3.0; 8 | 11.0; 30 | 3.5; 9 | 5.5; 15 | 8.5; 23 | 3.0; 8 | 1.5; 0 | 10.0; 27 | 7.0 |
| Marc/Alpha TV | 11–17 Apr 2012 | ? | 17.8; 48 | 22.3; 110 | 9.7; 26 | 3.9; 10 | 9.8; 26 | 3.1; 8 | 5.7; 15 | 8.6; 23 | 3.0; 8 | – | 9.9; 26 | 4.5 |
| VPRC/Epikaira | 10–12 Apr 2012 | ? | 14.5 | 22.0 | 11.5 | 3.5 | 13.0 | 2.5 | 5.0 | 10.0 | 1.5 | 1.5 | 9.0 | 7.5 |
| Pulse RC/Typos tis Kyriakis | 9–11 Apr 2012 | 1,206 | 15.5 | 21.5 | 11.5 | 3.0 | 11.5 | 3.0 | 5.0 | 9.0 | 2.5 | 2.0 | 9.5 | 6.0 |
| MRB/Real News | 7–10 Apr 2012 | 1,008 | 15.8 | 25.4 | 9.8 | 3.1 | 10.7 | 3.6 | 4.8 | 8.7 | 3.0 | 1.2 | 8.8 | 9.6 |
| GPO/Mega TV | 5–9 Apr 2012 | 1,200 | 19.3 | 24.7 | 10.9 | 5.4 | 8.4 | 2.0 | 4.2 | 8.0 | 3.4 | – | 9.5 | 5.4 |
| Public Issue/Skai–Kathimerini | 3–9 Apr 2012 | 1,226 | 14.5 | 19.0 | 11.0 | 3.0 | 13.0 | 3.0 | 5.0 | 12.0 | 2.0 | – | 11.0 | 4.5 |
| AUEB–STAT | 29 Mar–8 Apr 2012 | 1,731 | 17.9 | 18.7 | 9.9 | 2.1 | 12.7 | 5.3 | 6.0 | 6.9 | 2.1 | 1.5 | 12.0 | 0.8 |
| Metron Analysis | 20 Mar–6 Apr 2012 | 2,010 | 15.4 | 24.3 | 10.9 | 4.2 | 9.5 | 4.4 | 6.3 | 8.0 | 2.1 | – | 9.6 | 8.9 |
| Metron Analysis/Crisis Monitor | 4–5 Apr 2012 | 1,201 | 15.0 | 20.8 | 10.5 | 3.0 | 11.5 | 4.6 | 5.5 | 9.0 | 2.1 | – | 10.6 | 5.8 |
| Alco/Proto Thema | 3–5 Apr 2012 | 1,000 | 17.4; 51/52 | 25.9; 123/126 | 9.5; 25/26 | 3.7; 10 | 9.4; 25/26 | 3.2; 8/10 | 3.8; 11/12 | 8.5; 22/24 | 2.5; 0 | 1.0; 0 | 8.2; 22/23 | 8.5 |
| Alco/NewsIT | 20–28 Mar 2012 | 1,500 | 17.3 | 26.6 | 10.1 | 3.8 | 8.5 | 3.3 | 3.4 | 9.2 | 2.8 | 1.1 | 9.2 | 9.3 |
| Alco/Crash | 20–27 Mar 2012 | 1,000 | 17.4 | 26.8 | 10.3 | 3.7 | 7.7 | 3.2 | 2.7 | 10.1 | 2.7 | 1.4 | 9.1 | 9.4 |
| Public Issue/Skai–Kathimerini | 22–26 Mar 2012 | 1,017 | 15.5 | 22.5 | 12.0 | 2.0 | 12.5 | 3.0 | 5.0 | 12.0 | 2.0 | 1.0 | 8.5 | 7.0 |
| Metron Analysis/iefimerida | 21–23 Mar 2012 | 1,200 | 18.0 | 18.8 | 10.7 | 3.2 | 9.7 | 3.1 | 5.6 | 11.5 | 1.9 | – | 11.8 | 0.8 |
| Alco/Star | 20–23 Mar 2012 | 1,000 | 16.8 | 26.5 | 10.5 | 4.1 | 8.0 | 3.1 | 2.9 | 9.7 | 3.1 | 1.3 | 8.8 | 9.7 |
| Kapa Research/To Vima | 21–22 Mar 2012 | 1,011 | 19.1 | 24.2 | 10.9 | 4.8 | 8.0 | 3.3 | 4.5 | 6.5 | 3.1 | 0.9 | 9.6 | 5.1 |
| Marc/Ethnos | 19–21 Mar 2012 | 1,012 | 18.4; 52 | 24.8; 120 | 10.4; 29 | 3.5; 10 | 8.4; 23 | 2.7; 0 | 3.2; 9 | 10.2; 29 | 2.9; 0 | – | 9.9; 28 | 6.4 |
| MRB/Real News | 19–20 Mar 2012 | 1,003 | 15.2 | 25.5 | 10.8 | 3.1 | 9.9 | 3.8 | 3.3 | 9.3 | 3.1 | 1.9 | 8.8 | 10.3 |
| VPRC/Epikaira | 15–19 Mar 2012 | ? | 12.5 | 22.5 | 12.5 | 3.0 | 12.0 | 2.5 | 3.5 | 11.5 | 2.0 | 1.5 | 11.0 | 10.0 |
| Pulse RC/To Pontiki | 12–13 Mar 2012 | 1,212 | 13.5; 39 | 23.0; 116 | 12.5; 36 | 4.0; 11 | 12.5; 36 | 2.5; 0 | 4.5; 13 | 10.5; 30 | 2.5; 0 | 2.5; 0 | 6.5; 19 | 9.5 |
| Public Issue/Skai–Kathimerini | 8–13 Mar 2012 | 1,010 | 11.0 | 25.0 | 11.5 | 4.0 | 12.0 | 3.5 | 3.0 | 15.5 | 2.0 | – | 6.5 | 9.5 |
| Metron Analysis | 7–10 Mar 2012 | 1,001 | 11.4 | 23.1 | 11.5 | 4.4 | 10.9 | 4.4 | 3.3 | 15.0 | 3.4 | – | 5.2 | 8.1 |
| Public Issue/Skai–Kathimerini | 23–29 Feb 2012 | 1,006 | 11.0 | 28.0 | 11.0 | 4.0 | 12.0 | 4.0 | 3.5 | 16.0 | 2.0 | 1.0 | 4.0 | 12.0 |
| GPO/Mega TV | 20 Feb 2012 | ? | 17.3 | 25.6 | 12.5 | 6.7 | 11.2 | 2.5 | – | 15.8 | 3.3 | 1.1 | – | 8.3 |
| Rass/To Paron | 16–17 Feb 2012 | 1,005 | 11.1 | 26.3 | 10.6 | 3.9 | 13.4 | 5.0 | 3.4 | 16.4 | 3.8 | 1.2 | – | 9.9 |
| Marc/Ethnos | 15–17 Feb 2012 | 1,013 | 13.9; 39 | 24.0; 117 | 11.9; 34 | 6.9; 19 | 10.7; 30 | 3.3; 9 | 2.8; 0 | 15.2; 43 | 3.2; 9 | 1.7; 0 | – | 8.8 |
| VPRC/Epikaira | 16 Feb 2012 | ? | 11.0 | 27.5 | 14.0 | 4.5 | 13.5 | 3.5 | 2.5 | 16.0 | 2.0 | 2.0 | – | 11.5 |
| Metron Analysis | 15–16 Feb 2012 | 1,203 | 11.4 | 25.5 | 11.1 | 5.5 | 11.1 | 4.8 | 3.9 | 16.2 | 2.7 | 2.4 | – | 9.3 |
| Alco/Proto Thema | 14–16 Feb 2012 | 1,000 | 12.1 | 27.7 | 12.1 | 6.2 | 9.4 | 3.9 | 3.9 | 13.3 | 3.5 | 2.0 | – | 14.4 |
| MRB/Real News | 14–16 Feb 2012 | 1,016 | 11.9 | 27.5 | 12.8 | 4.9 | 11.9 | 3.9 | 3.0 | 14.6 | 3.0 | 1.9 | – | 12.9 |
| Rass/To Paron | 7–10 Feb 2012 | 1,202 | 11.1 | 27.3 | 9.1 | 5.0 | 11.2 | 5.4 | 3.6 | 17.5 | 3.7 | 1.5 | – | 9.8 |
| Alco/Proto Thema | 6–10 Feb 2012 | 1,000 | 12.7 | 27.1 | 12.1 | 6.3 | 9.3 | 3.8 | 2.8 | 13.2 | 3.1 | 2.1 | – | 13.9 |
| Public Issue/Skai–Kathimerini | 31 Jan–3 Feb 2012 | 1,002 | 8.0 | 31.0 | 12.5 | 5.0 | 12.0 | 3.5 | 3.0 | 18.0 | 2.0 | – | – | 13.0 |
| Pulse RC/To Pontiki | 30 Jan–1 Feb 2012 | 1,784 | 13.5; 36 | 27.0; 121 | 12.5; 33 | 5.5; 15 | 12.0; 32 | 3.5; 9 | 3.0; 8 | 11.5; 30 | 3.0; 8 | 3.0; 8 | – | 13.5 |
| ToThePoint/ERT3 | 26–28 Jan 2012 | 1,001 | 10.2 | 27.1 | 12.7 | 6.3 | 12.0 | 5.2 | 2.5 | 10.9 | – | – | – | 14.4 |
| VPRC/Epikaira | 26 Jan 2012 | ? | 12.0 | 30.5 | 12.5 | 6.0 | 12.5 | 3.0 | 2.5 | 13.0 | 2.5 | 2.5 | – | 17.5 |
| Alco/Star | 23–26 Jan 2012 | 1,000 | 15.9 | 31.0 | 11.0 | 7.2 | 8.7 | 3.0 | 1.7 | 11.4 | 2.7 | 1.6 | – | 15.1 |
| Metron Analysis | 14 Jan 2012 | ? | 13.8 | 25.2 | 12.4 | 6.1 | 11.2 | 6.1 | 1.9 | 13.9 | 2.6 | – | – | 11.3 |
| Public Issue/Skai–Kathimerini | 5–10 Jan 2012 | 1,018 | 14.0; 32/43 | 30.5; 125/138 | 12.5; 29/38 | 5.5; 12/18 | 12.0; 29/35 | 4.0; 8/13 | – | 13.5; 28/45 | 2.5; 0/9 | – | – | 16.5 |
| Kapa Research/To Vima | 28–29 Dec 2011 | 1,004 | 17.9 | 30.4 | 13.2 | 7.5 | 8.8 | 4.0 | – | 7.1 | 3.5 | – | – | 12.5 |
| Marc/Ethnos | 12–15 Dec 2011 | 1,007 | 17.5 | 27.7 | 11.6 | 9.6 | 8.2 | 4.2 | – | 9.2 | 3.4 | 3.0 | – | 10.2 |
| ToThePoint/ERT3 | 9–13 Dec 2011 | 1,153 | 17.8 | 24.1 | 11.5 | 5.2 | 8.9 | 4.9 | – | 7.0 | – | – | – | 6.3 |
| Alco/Kontra Channel | 6–12 Dec 2011 | 1,000 | 18.0 | 29.9 | 13.0 | 7.0 | 8.4 | 4.5 | – | 9.6 | 3.5 | 0.6 | – | 11.9 |
| VPRC/Epikaira | 6–8 Dec 2011 | ? | 18.0 | 30.5 | 13.0 | 7.0 | 11.0 | 3.0 | 1.5 | 8.5 | 2.0 | 2.0 | – | 12.5 |
| MRB/Real.gr | 1–8 Dec 2011 | 2,000 | 19.1; 53 | 32.7; 140 | 11.2; 31 | 7.1; 20 | 8.8; 24 | 4.7; 13 | 1.8; 0 | 7.0; 19 | 2.5; 0 | 1.3; 0 | – | 13.6 |
| Pulse RC/To Pontiki | 6–7 Dec 2011 | 1,059 | 18.0 | 27.5 | 13.0 | 7.0 | 11.5 | 3.5 | – | 7.5 | 3.5 | 2.5 | – | 9.5 |
| Public Issue/Skai–Kathimerini | 1–5 Dec 2011 | 1,008 | 15.5; 35/47 | 30.0; 123/136 | 13.5; 31/40 | 6.0; 13/19 | 14.0; 33/42 | 4.0; 8/14 | – | 9.5; 18/32 | 3.0; 0/12 | – | – | 14.5 |
| GPO/Mega TV | 30 Nov–5 Dec 2011 | ? | 20.4 | 28.7 | 13.4 | 9.5 | 8.1 | 4.0 | – | 8.4 | 3.1 | 1.1 | – | 8.3 |
| Metron Analysis/Eleftheros Typos | 15 Nov–5 Dec 2011 | 2,204 | 17.1 | 29.3 | 13.6 | 9.2 | 10.7 | 5.8 | – | 5.9 | 2.5 | 2.4 | – | 12.2 |
| Rass/To Paron | 15–18 Nov 2011 | 1,202 | 19.2 | 31.9 | 11.0 | 7.4 | 7.7 | 4.3 | – | 8.0 | 3.8 | 1.7 | – | 12.7 |
| Alco/NewsIT | 14–16 Nov 2011 | 1,000 | 16.6 | 29.9 | 11.3 | 7.3 | 8.1 | 3.9 | – | 8.8 | 3.5 | 0.9 | – | 13.3 |
| VPRC/Epikaira | 10–14 Nov 2011 | ? | 18.5 | 32.0 | 12.5 | 7.0 | 10.0 | 3.5 | 1.0 | 6.5 | 2.0 | 2.0 | – | 13.5 |
| Metron Analysis/protagon.gr | 11–12 Nov 2011 | ? | 18.5; 51 | 26.3; 123 | 11.8; 33 | 11.2; 31 | 10.0; 28 | 5.6; 15 | 1.9; 0 | 7.0; 19 | 2.9; 0 | 2.0; 0 | – | 7.8 |
| MRB/Real News | 10–11 Nov 2011 | 1,012 | 18.1; 49 | 33.1; 140 | 11.0; 30 | 7.1; 19 | 8.8; 24 | 3.2; 9 | – | 7.5; 20 | 3.2; 9 | 1.5; 0 | – | 15.0 |
| Public Issue/Skai–Kathimerini | 3–10 Nov 2011 | 1,206 | 19.5; 46/61 | 28.5; 121/134 | 11.0; 27/33 | 8.5; 20/26 | 12.0; 30/36 | 3.5; 8/12 | – | 7.5; 15/26 | 2.5; 0/9 | – | – | 9.0 |
| Alco/Proto Thema | 2–4 Nov 2011 | 1,000 | 21.5 | 32.3 | 11.2 | 8.2 | 7.6 | 3.9 | – | 5.3 | 3.2 | 1.3 | – | 10.8 |
| Marc/Ethnos | 2–3 Nov 2011 | 1,004 | 20.5 | 30.3 | 11.2 | 7.9 | 7.1 | 3.1 | – | 7.5 | 3.3 | 2.2 | – | 9.8 |
| Pulse RC/Typos tis Kyriakis | 1–3 Nov 2011 | 1,209 | 18.5 | 29.5 | 12.5 | 7.5 | 10.5 | 3.5 | – | 5.5 | 2.0 | 3.5 | – | 11.0 |
| Kapa Research/To Vima | 27 Oct 2011 | 1,009 | 20.0 | 30.2 | 12.4 | 8.6 | 6.9 | 4.6 | – | 5.7 | 3.5 | 2.4 | – | 10.2 |
| VPRC/Epikaira | 6–10 Oct 2011 | ? | 19.5 | 31.0 | 13.5 | 8.0 | 8.5 | 4.5 | 1.5 | 4.0 | 2.0 | 2.0 | – | 11.5 |
| Public Issue/Skai–Kathimerini | 29 Sep–4 Oct 2011 | 1,015 | 22.5; 53/71 | 31.5; 129/145 | 10.5; 25/33 | 9.0; 21/28 | 9.5; 23/30 | 3.0; 0/11 | – | 5.0; 8/20 | 2.0; 0/8 | – | – | 9.0 |
| GPO/Mega TV | 22–26 Sep 2011 | 1,000 | 21.7 | 31.2 | 13.7 | 11.0 | 6.7 | 3.4 | – | 3.8 | 2.8 | 2.2 | – | 9.5 |
| Alco/Proto Thema | 21–23 Sep 2011 | 1,000 | 23.0 | 31.7 | 11.0 | 8.3 | 7.5 | 4.4 | – | 3.6 | 3.2 | 2.4 | – | 8.7 |
| Pulse RC/Typos tis Kyriakis | 21–22 Sep 2011 | ? | 22.0 | 30.5 | 13.0 | 8.0 | 7.0 | 3.5 | – | 4.5 | 3.0 | 3.0 | – | 8.5 |
| Rass/To Paron | 20–22 Sep 2011 | 1,203 | 27.2 | 32.9 | 10.5 | 6.8 | 5.4 | 4.1 | – | 4.2 | 3.4 | 2.0 | – | 5.7 |
| Public Issue/Skai–Kathimerini | 2–7 Sep 2011 | 1,216 | 28.0; 67/81 | 32.0; 129/140 | 10.5; 25/30 | 8.0; 18/24 | 9.0; 20/28 | 4.0; 8/13 | – | 3.0; 8/11 | 1.5; 0 | – | – | 4.0 |
| VPRC/Epikaira | 31 Aug–5 Sep 2011 | ? | 24.5 | 30.0 | 13.0 | 7.5 | 7.0 | 5.0 | 1.5 | 3.0 | 1.5 | 1.0 | – | 5.5 |
| Alco/Proto Thema | 30 Aug–2 Sep 2011 | 1,000 | 25.1 | 32.2 | 10.3 | 8.1 | 5.8 | 4.9 | – | 3.4 | 3.2 | 2.0 | – | 7.1 |
| Kapa Research/To Vima | 1 Sep 2011 | ? | 30.6 | 31.5 | 10.5 | 7.9 | 4.5 | 3.0 | – | 3.3 | 3.2 | 3.0 | – | 0.9 |
| MRB/Real News | 30–31 Aug 2011 | 1,006 | 27.2; 73/81 | 34.6; 143/154 | 9.4; 25/28 | 6.4; 17/19 | 5.9; 16/18 | 3.6; 0/10 | – | 3.1; 0/9 | 2.7; 0/8 | 1.5; 0 | – | 7.4 |
| Public Issue/Skai–Kathimerini | 14 Aug 2011 | ? | 30.5 | 30.0 | 11.5 | 7.5 | 7.5 | 3.0 | – | 3.5 | 1.5 | – | – | 0.5 |
| Metron Analysis/Eleftheros Typos | 27 Jun–14 Jul 2011 | 2,211 | 25.6 | 30.1 | 11.1 | 9.2 | 8.4 | 4.1 | – | 2.5 | 2.8 | 3.8 | – | 4.5 |
| Public Issue/Skai–Kathimerini | 6–12 Jul 2011 | 1,208 | 26.5; 66/80 | 32.5; 133/147 | 11.5; 29/34 | 7.5; 18/23 | 9.0; 22/27 | 3.5; 8/12 | 1.0; 0 | 2.0; 0 | 1.5; 0 | 0.5; 0 | – | 6.0 |
| Kapa Research/To Vima | 7 Jul 2011 | 1,003 | 25.5 | 27.5 | 11.6 | 8.8 | 5.6 | 3.4 | – | 4.8 | 4.3 | 4.8 | – | 2.0 |
| VPRC/Epikaira | 5–7 Jul 2011 | ? | 25.5 | 29.5 | 13.0 | 7.5 | 7.0 | 4.0 | 1.5 | 2.5 | 2.0 | 1.0 | – | 4.0 |
| Rass/To Paron | 27 Jun–1 Jul 2011 | 2,002 | 30.2 | 31.9 | 10.2 | 6.3 | 4.5 | 4.3 | – | 3.0 | 3.1 | 2.9 | – | 1.7 |
| Marc/Ethnos | 21–23 Jun 2011 | 1,014 | 27.5 | 29.5 | 10.3 | 8.0 | 4.9 | 3.1 | – | 3.8 | 3.8 | 2.8 | – | 2.0 |
| MRB/Real.gr | 20–21 Jun 2011 | ? | 30.1; 87 | 33.2; 145 | 9.3; 27 | 6.3; 18 | 4.7; 13 | 3.6; 10 | – | 2.7; 0 | 2.7; 0 | 1.5; 0 | – | 3.1 |
| GPO/Mega TV | 20–21 Jun 2011 | ? | 27.5 | 28.7 | 12.6 | 8.9 | 5.5 | 2.9 | – | 4.1 | 2.7 | 3.0 | – | 1.2 |
| Alco/Real FM | 17–20 Jun 2011 | 1,000 | 28.5 | 30.9 | 11.1 | 7.4 | 4.5 | 3.3 | – | 3.3 | 3.5 | 1.6 | – | 2.4 |
| VPRC/Epikaira | 16–20 Jun 2011 | ? | 26.0 | 28.5 | 13.5 | 7.0 | 6.5 | 3.5 | 1.0 | 3.0 | 2.0 | 0.5 | – | 2.5 |
| MRB/Real.gr | 9–14 Jun 2011 | 1,596 | 29.7 | 34.6 | 9.6 | 6.6 | 4.8 | 4.0 | – | 2.7 | 2.8 | 1.2 | – | 4.9 |
| Public Issue/Skai–Kathimerini | 1–7 Jun 2011 | 1,204 | 27.0; 65/90 | 31.0; 128/149 | 11.0; 27/36 | 8.0; 19/27 | 6.5; 15/22 | 3.5; 0/13 | 1.0; 0 | 3.0; 0/11 | 2.5; 0/9 | 1.0; 0 | – | 4.0 |
| VPRC/Epikaira | 25–27 May 2011 | ? | 30.5 | 31.0 | 12.0 | 7.5 | 5.5 | 3.0 | 1.0 | 2.5 | 1.0 | 0.5 | – | 0.5 |
| Pulse RC/Typos tis Kyriakis | 25–26 May 2011 | 1,208 | 27.5 | 28.5 | 13.0 | 8.0 | 6.0 | 3.5 | – | 3.0 | 3.0 | 3.0 | – | 1.0 |
| Alco/Proto Thema | 24–26 May 2011 | 1,000 | 30.5 | 30.1 | 11.6 | 8.2 | 4.7 | 3.0 | – | 3.4 | 3.8 | 1.6 | – | 0.4 |
| Rass/To Paron | 17–20 May 2011 | 2,002 | 32.5 | 31.3 | 9.9 | 7.2 | 4.1 | 4.2 | – | 2.4 | 2.5 | 2.3 | – | 1.2 |
| MRB/Real News | 18 May 2011 | 1,005 | 31.8; 84/144 | 31.8; 84/144 | 9.5; 25/28 | 7.1; 18/21 | 4.8; 13/14 | 3.8; 0/11 | – | 2.7; 0/8 | 2.4; 0/8 | 1.5; 0 | – | Tie |
| Public Issue/Skai–Kathimerini | 4–10 May 2011 | 1,199 | 32.0; 128/149 | 29.0; 72/89 | 12.0; 27/39 | 8.0; 19/26 | 6.5; 15/21 | 3.5; 0/12 | 1.5; 0 | 3.5; 0/12 | 1.5; 0 | 0.5; 0 | – | 3.0 |
| GPO/Mega TV | 5–9 May 2011 | 1,205 | 31.3 | 28.9 | 12.9 | 10.0 | 4.7 | 3.4 | – | 3.4 | 3.6 | 3.6 | – | 2.4 |
| Pulse RC/To Pontiki | 5–6 May 2011 | 1,210 | 30.0 | 27.0 | 12.0 | 8.0 | 5.0 | 3.5 | – | 3.0 | 3.0 | 3.5 | – | 3.0 |
| Marc/Ethnos | 3–5 May 2011 | 1,015 | 31.7 | 26.7 | 10.3 | 9.0 | 4.3 | 3.2 | – | 3.5 | 3.8 | 3.7 | – | 5.0 |
| VPRC/Epikaira | 28 Apr 2011 | ? | 31.5 | 30.5 | 12.0 | 7.5 | 5.0 | 3.5 | 1.5 | 2.0 | 1.5 | – | – | 1.0 |
| Alco/Proto Thema | 15–19 Apr 2011 | 1,000 | 31.4 | 28.4 | 12.4 | 8.4 | 4.7 | 2.9 | – | 3.4 | 2.5 | – | – | 3.0 |
| Kapa Research/To Vima | 11–14 Apr 2011 | ? | 31.0 | 28.8 | 12.2 | 8.3 | 4.4 | 3.9 | – | 3.6 | 3.1 | – | – | 2.2 |
| Public Issue/Skai–Kathimerini | 8–12 Apr 2011 | 1,186 | 33.5 | 27.0 | 12.0 | 8.5 | 5.5 | 3.0 | 1.0 | 3.0 | 2.5 | – | – | 6.5 |
| MRB/Real News | 1–2 Apr 2011 | 1,032 | 33.3 | 30.7 | 10.0 | 8.0 | 4.5 | 4.0 | – | 2.5 | 2.5 | – | – | 3.7 |
| Rass/To Paron | 28 Mar–1 Apr 2011 | 2,002 | 34.4 | 30.7 | 9.9 | 7.3 | 4.5 | 4.7 | – | 2.6 | 2.5 | – | – | 3.7 |
| Metron Analysis/Eleftheros Typos | 8–27 Mar 2011 | 2,203 | 33.6 | 29.3 | 10.5 | 10.1 | 5.8 | 4.9 | – | 1.6 | 3.0 | – | – | 4.3 |
| Public Issue/Skai–Kathimerini | 1–4 Mar 2011 | 1,215 | 35.0 | 28.5 | 11.0 | 9.0 | 5.0 | 2.5 | 1.0 | 2.5 | 2.0 | – | – | 6.5 |
| Alco/Proto Thema | 1–3 Mar 2011 | 1,000 | 31.8 | 28.5 | 12.1 | 8.1 | 3.7 | 3.2 | – | 3.1 | 3.5 | – | – | 3.3 |
| Alco | 22–28 Feb 2011 | 1,000 | 33.1 | 29.6 | 11.4 | 7.9 | 3.6 | 2.2 | – | 1.6 | 2.5 | – | – | 3.5 |
| MRB/Real News | 23–24 Feb 2011 | 1,018 | 34.9 | 32.1 | 10.5 | 6.5 | 3.5 | 3.0 | – | 2.5 | 2.5 | – | – | 2.8 |
| Marc/Ethnos | 10–21 Feb 2011 | 2,003 | 33.5 | 27.4 | 10.3 | 7.6 | 4.5 | 3.7 | – | 3.7 | 4.3 | – | – | 6.1 |
| Rass/To Paron | 14–18 Feb 2011 | 2,002 | 35.1 | 30.5 | 10.8 | 6.9 | 4.3 | 4.0 | – | 2.3 | 2.4 | – | – | 4.6 |
| Pulse RC | 16–17 Feb 2011 | ? | 33.5 | 28.5 | 13.0 | 8.0 | 4.5 | 3.0 | – | 3.0 | 3.0 | – | – | 5.0 |
| VPRC/Epikaira | 11–14 Feb 2011 | 1,003 | 33.0 | 32.0 | 12.5 | 5.0 | 5.0 | 4.0 | – | 2.5 | 2.0 | – | – | 1.0 |
| Public Issue/Skai–Kathimerini | 4–8 Feb 2011 | 1,009 | 38.0 | 30.5 | 10.5 | 6.0 | 4.5 | 3.0 | 0.5 | 2.5 | 2.0 | – | – | 7.5 |
| GPO/Mega TV | 3–7 Feb 2011 | 1,202 | 34.7 | 27.7 | 11.7 | 8.5 | 4.0 | 3.6 | – | 3.3 | 4.0 | – | – | 7.0 |
| Rass/To Paron | 17–21 Jan 2011 | 2,002 | 35.7 | 30.9 | 10.9 | 5.5 | 3.9 | 4.1 | – | 2.9 | 2.8 | – | – | 4.8 |
| Marc/Ethnos | 11–13 Jan 2011 | ? | 36.8 | 27.8 | 10.3 | 6.4 | 4.0 | 2.6 | – | 2.9 | 3.7 | – | – | 9.0 |
| Alco/Proto Thema | 11–13 Jan 2011 | 1,000 | 32.5 | 27.0 | 11.7 | 7.8 | 3.7 | 3.9 | – | 2.8 | 3.8 | – | – | 5.5 |
| Public Issue/Skai–Kathimerini | 7–11 Jan 2011 | 1,005 | 38.5 | 30.5 | 10.5 | 5.5 | 6.0 | 2.5 | – | 2.0 | 2.0 | – | – | 8.0 |
| Kapa Research/To Vima | 21–24 Dec 2010 | ? | 32.6 | 29.6 | 12.8 | 5.9 | 4.8 | 3.5 | – | 3.4 | 4.1 | – | – | 3.0 |
| VPRC | 18 Dec 2010 | ? | 34.5 | 32.5 | 12.0 | 5.0 | 4.5 | 3.0 | – | 1.5 | 2.5 | – | – | 2.0 |
| Metron Analysis | 23 Nov–13 Dec 2010 | 2,202 | 35.8 | 29.1 | 12.0 | 7.1 | 4.5 | 3.9 | – | 2.1 | 3.5 | – | – | 6.7 |
| Public Issue/Skai–Kathimerini | 2–8 Dec 2010 | 1,006 | 39.0 | 30.0 | 11.0 | 5.5 | 5.5 | 2.0 | – | 2.5 | 2.0 | – | – | 9.0 |
| MRB/Real News | 25 Nov–3 Dec 2010 | 2,100 | 36.3 | 30.7 | 10.0 | 5.0 | 4.0 | 4.0 | – | 2.5 | 3.5 | – | – | 5.6 |
| Rass/To Paron | 22–25 Nov 2010 | 2,003 | 36.4 | 30.7 | 10.9 | 5.4 | 4.0 | 4.1 | – | 2.9 | 3.2 | – | – | 5.7 |
| MRB/Real News | 14–15 Nov 2010 | 1,022 | 37.8 | 32.2 | 10.0 | 4.5 | 3.0 | 2.0 | – | 2.0 | – | – | – | 5.6 |
| 2010 local elections | 7 Nov 2010 | —N/a | 34.7 | 32.8 | 10.9 | 4.0 | 5.0 | 2.8 | – | 2.2 | – | – | – | 1.9 |
| Public Issue/Skai–Kathimerini | 4–6 Nov 2010 | ? | 39.5 | 29.5 | 11.0 | 5.0 | 5.0 | 3.0 | – | 1.5 | – | – | – | 10.0 |
| VPRC/tvxs | 15–21 Oct 2010 | 1,301 | 33.5 | 24.0 | 15.0 | 5.0 | 5.5 | 5.0 | – | 1.5 | – | – | – | 9.5 |
| Rass/To Paron | 13–15 Oct 2010 | 1,003 | 38.0 | 30.6 | 11.5 | 6.2 | 4.3 | 3.9 | – | 2.4 | – | – | – | 7.4 |
| Pulse RC/Typos tis Kyriakis | 13–14 Oct 2010 | 1,115 | 37.5 | 29.0 | 12.0 | 5.5 | 4.0 | 3.5 | – | – | – | – | – | 8.5 |
| Public Issue/Skai–Kathimerini | 1–4 Oct 2010 | 1,045 | 42.5 | 28.0 | 11.0 | 5.5 | 4.5 | 2.5 | – | 1.5 | – | – | – | 14.5 |
| Rass/To Paron | 20–24 Sep 2010 | 2,005 | 38.6 | 30.7 | 10.5 | 6.3 | 4.2 | 4.1 | – | 2.7 | – | – | – | 7.9 |
| Pulse RC/Typos tis Kyriakis | 22–23 Sep 2010 | 1,051 | 38.5 | 29.0 | 11.5 | 6.5 | 3.5 | 4.0 | – | – | – | – | – | 9.5 |
| Alco/Proto Thema | 8–10 Sep 2010 | 1,000 | 38.4 | 28.0 | 10.7 | 6.7 | 3.8 | 2.1 | – | 3.4 | – | – | – | 10.4 |
| Kapa Research/To Vima | 8–9 Sep 2010 | 1,005 | 40.8 | 29.9 | 10.8 | 6.3 | 3.6 | 2.7 | – | 2.9 | – | – | – | 10.9 |
| Alco/Proto Thema | 5–9 Sep 2010 | 1,000 | 40.6 | 30.0 | 10.4 | 6.7 | 4.0 | 1.5 | – | 3.5 | – | – | – | 10.6 |
| Pulse RC/To Pontiki | 3–8 Sep 2010 | 1,055 | 39.5 | 28.0 | 10.5 | 7.5 | 3.5 | 3.5 | – | – | – | – | – | 11.5 |
| VPRC/tvxs | 2–7 Sep 2010 | 1,083 | 34.5 | 25.0 | 13.0 | 6.5 | 7.5 | 6.5 | – | 2.0 | – | – | – | 9.5 |
| Public Issue/Skai–Kathimerini | 2–6 Sep 2010 | 1,009 | 44.0 | 27.0 | 10.5 | 5.5 | 4.0 | 2.5 | – | 2.0 | – | – | – | 17.0 |
| Rass/To Paron | 31 Aug–3 Sep 2010 | 1,503 | 38.5 | 29.4 | 10.6 | 6.9 | 4.2 | 4.1 | – | 2.9 | – | – | – | 9.1 |
| MRB/Real News | 1–2 Sep 2010 | 1,000 | 39.4 | 29.1 | 9.0 | 6.5 | 3.5 | 3.5 | – | – | – | – | – | 10.3 |
| GPO/Mega TV | 26–30 Aug 2010 | ? | 38.2 | 28.2 | 12.0 | 9.1 | 3.7 | 3.7 | – | 2.3 | – | – | – | 10.0 |
| VPRC/Axía | 14–16 Jul 2010 | 1,156 | 35.5 | 29.5 | 12.5 | 5.0 | 5.5 | 4.0 | – | 2.0 | – | – | – | 6.0 |
| Public Issue/Skai–Kathimerini | 1–5 Jul 2010 | 1,006 | 43.0 | 25.0 | 10.0 | 6.0 | 5.0 | 4.0 | – | 3.5 | – | – | – | 18.0 |
| Metron Analysis/Avgi | 10 Jun–2 Jul 2010 | 2,206 | 39.2 | 28.3 | 11.0 | 7.7 | 6.0 | 4.9 | – | – | – | – | – | 10.9 |
| Kapa Research/To Vima | 30 Jun–1 Jul 2010 | 1,002 | 39.1 | 26.0 | 11.2 | 6.8 | 3.8 | – | – | – | – | – | – | 13.1 |
| Rass/To Paron | 24 Jun–1 Jul 2010 | 2,003 | 37.1 | 29.0 | 11.7 | 7.4 | 4.8 | 5.0 | – | – | – | – | – | 8.1 |
| Alco/NewsIT | 23–24 Jun 2010 | 1,000 | 40.5 | 27.9 | 12.9 | 6.0 | 4.5 | 2.6 | – | – | – | – | – | 12.6 |
| MRB/Mega TV | 3–11 Jun 2010 | 2,100 | 43.7 | 31.3 | 8.5 | 5.5 | 4.5 | 3.0 | – | – | – | – | – | 12.4 |
| Public Issue/Skai–Kathimerini | 2–7 Jun 2010 | 1,019 | 45.0 | 27.0 | 9.5 | 5.5 | 5.5 | 3.5 | – | – | – | – | – | 18.0 |
| Alco/Proto Thema | 12–14 May 2010 | 1,000 | 41.2 | 28.6 | 10.6 | 7.0 | 4.5 | 2.5 | – | – | – | – | – | 12.6 |
| Marc/Ethnos | 11–13 May 2010 | 1,028 | 40.5 | 27.1 | 10.8 | 7.2 | 5.1 | 3.7 | – | – | – | – | – | 13.4 |
| Public Issue/Skai–Kathimerini | 6–10 May 2010 | 1,006 | 45.0 | 27.0 | 10.0 | 6.0 | 6.0 | 3.0 | – | – | – | – | – | 18.0 |
| MRB/Real News | 5–6 May 2010 | 1,001 | 42.9 | 29.1 | 8.5 | 6.0 | 5.0 | 3.0 | – | – | – | – | – | 13.8 |
| Kapa Research/To Vima | 28–29 Apr 2010 | 1,256 | 43.2 | 29.0 | 9.4 | 5.9 | 4.6 | – | – | – | – | – | – | 14.2 |
| Alco/Proto Thema | 27–29 Apr 2010 | 1,000 | 41.0 | 28.3 | 9.0 | 7.7 | 4.1 | 2.2 | – | – | – | – | – | 12.7 |
| GPO/Mega TV | 22–26 Apr 2010 | 1,409 | 41.1 | 28.2 | 11.9 | 9.3 | 4.3 | 2.6 | – | – | – | – | – | 12.9 |
| Rass/To Paron | 20–22 Apr 2010 | 1,001 | 40.9 | 29.6 | 10.3 | 5.9 | 4.3 | 2.9 | – | – | – | – | – | 11.3 |
| Public Issue/Skai–Kathimerini | 7–12 Apr 2010 | 1,016 | 46.5 | 30.0 | 8.0 | 6.0 | 5.0 | 2.0 | – | – | – | – | – | 16.5 |
| Alco/Proto Thema | 30 Mar–1 Apr 2010 | 1,000 | 43.1 | 29.7 | 8.5 | 7.4 | 4.6 | 2.8 | – | – | – | – | – | 13.4 |
| MRB/Real News | 26–29 Mar 2010 | 1,011 | 43.6 | 28.9 | 8.5 | 6.5 | 5.0 | 3.0 | – | – | – | – | – | 14.7 |
| Rass/To Paron | 12 Mar 2010 | 1,001 | 41.5 | 30.3 | 9.7 | 6.3 | 5.8 | 3.9 | – | – | – | – | – | 11.2 |
| Marc/Ethnos | 8–10 Mar 2010 | ? | 42.4 | 28.5 | 10.4 | 8.4 | 5.0 | 2.2 | – | – | – | – | – | 13.9 |
| Metron Analysis/Eleftheros Typos | 18 Feb–9 Mar 2010 | 2,206 | 43.0 | 28.9 | 9.4 | 8.4 | 5.7 | 3.7 | – | – | – | – | – | 14.1 |
| GPO/Mega TV | 4–8 Mar 2010 | ? | 42.2 | 28.0 | 11.6 | 9.0 | 5.4 | 2.4 | – | – | – | – | – | 14.2 |
| Public Issue/Skai–Kathimerini | 3–8 Mar 2010 | 1,006 | 47.5 | 30.5 | 7.5 | 6.0 | 5.0 | 1.5 | – | – | – | – | – | 17.0 |
| Pulse RC/Eleftheros Typos | 3–5 Mar 2010 | 1,577 | 44.5 | 27.0 | 10.0 | 8.5 | 5.5 | 1.5 | – | – | – | – | – | 15.5 |
| MRB/Real News | 24–25 Feb 2010 | 1,005 | 46.3 | 30.7 | 7.5 | 6.5 | 4.5 | 2.0 | – | – | – | – | – | 15.6 |
| Public Issue/Skai–Kathimerini | 4–9 Feb 2010 | 1,042 | 48.0 | 31.5 | 7.5 | 6.0 | 4.5 | 1.0 | – | – | – | – | – | 16.5 |
| GPO/Mega TV | 14–18 Jan 2010 | 1,043 | 44.6 | 32.4 | 7.8 | 6.1 | 4.7 | 3.3 | – | – | – | – | – | 12.2 |
| Palmos Analysis | 11–13 Jan 2010 | 1,042 | 47.0 | 31.0 | 7.0 | 5.0 | 4.0 | 3.0 | – | – | – | – | – | 16.0 |
| Rass/Paraskevi+13 | 11–13 Jan 2010 | 1,503 | 44.6 | 34.8 | 7.1 | 4.5 | 4.3 | 3.3 | – | – | – | – | – | 9.8 |
| Alco/NewsIT | 11–13 Jan 2010 | 1,000 | 44.4 | 32.9 | 8.3 | 5.6 | 3.8 | 1.9 | – | – | – | – | – | 11.5 |
| Public Issue/Skai–Kathimerini | 8–12 Jan 2010 | 1,042 | 48.0 | 30.5 | 7.5 | 5.5 | 5.5 | 1.5 | – | – | – | – | – | 17.5 |
| Alco/Proto Thema | 5–8 Jan 2010 | 1,000 | 44.4 | 32.7 | 8.1 | 5.8 | 4.6 | 2.6 | – | – | – | – | – | 11.7 |
| Marc/Ethnos | 4–7 Jan 2010 | 1,001 | 44.7 | 32.7 | 7.6 | 5.9 | 4.4 | 1.8 | – | – | – | – | – | 12.0 |
| Metron Analysis/Imerisia | 2–10 Dec 2009 | 996 | 44.1 | 33.9 | 7.5 | 4.7 | 4.6 | 3.9 | – | – | – | – | – | 10.2 |
| Public Issue | 7–9 Dec 2009 | 1,046 | 48.0 | 32.0 | 7.5 | 5.0 | 4.5 | 1.5 | – | – | – | – | – | 16.0 |
| MRB/Mega TV | 1–7 Dec 2009 | 2,100 | 44.3 | 35.2 | 7.0 | 4.5 | 4.0 | 2.0 | – | – | – | – | – | 9.1 |
| Alco/NewsIT | 1–2 Dec 2009 | 1,000 | 43.9 | 35.4 | 6.8 | 4.0 | 4.4 | 1.7 | – | – | – | – | – | 8.5 |
| Metron Analysis/Imerisia | 17–28 Nov 2009 | 1,204 | 44.7 | 30.7 | 8.6 | 6.6 | 4.7 | 3.3 | – | – | – | – | – | 14.0 |
| Focus/Real News | 11–12 Nov 2009 | 1,000 | 50.5 | 26.1 | 8.0 | 7.3 | 4.1 | 2.1 | – | – | – | – | – | 24.4 |
| Public Issue/Skai–Kathimerini | 9–12 Nov 2009 | 1,028 | 51.5 | 26.0 | 7.5 | 6.0 | 5.0 | 2.5 | – | – | – | – | – | 25.5 |
| Public Issue/Skai–Kathimerini | 12–14 Oct 2009 | 1,033 | 53.0 | 22.0 | 7.5 | 6.0 | 5.0 | 3.5 | – | – | – | – | – | 31.0 |
| 2009 parliamentary election | 4 Oct 2009 | —N/a | 43.9; 160 | 33.5; 91 | 7.5; 21 | 5.6; 15 | 4.6; 13 | 2.5; 0 | 0.3; 0 | – | – | – | – | 10.4 |
