= Panathinaikos Movement =

Greek political party

- Abbreviation: PAN.KI.
- Leader: Ioannis Alevizos
- Founded: 2012 by Giorgos Betsikas
- Headquarters: Panathinaikos, Athens
- Political position: Centre
- Hellenic Parliament: 0 / 300
- Municipalities: 1 / 12,978
- Regions: 0 / 725
- European Parliament: 0 / 21

Website
- paokingr.substack.com

The Panathinaikos Movement (Greek: Παναθηναϊκό Κίνημα) is a Greek political party, founded in 2012. The Panathinaikos Movement is the first political and social political party in the history of the country, founded by people with an initial common of their love for the sports club of Panathinaikos and the wish for a new stadium for the football team, despite the bureaucracy of the Greek state.

The party participated in the May 2012 Greek legislative election and received 31 votes, although they did not have ballots. Anyone who wanted to vote the party wrote PANATHINAIKOS MOVEMENT over a blank ballot and a legal representative put a seal to be considered as valid. In the parliamentary elections of June 2012 Panathinaikos Movement rapidly increased rates, rising from the 31 votes they had on previous elections to 12,439 votes (0.20%). At local elections on 18 May 2014 Panathinaikos Movement got 2.91% of the vote in the municipality of Athens (6.489 votes), winning a seat at the City Council.

== Party Positions ==
The party's stances encompass several key aspects. Firstly, they advocate for raising the minimum wage to 800 Euros. Additionally, they propose the implementation of "Rent control" zones in all cities, aiming to regulate rental prices and ensure affordable housing options for residents, also emphasizing the need for student dormitories to be established, providing free housing for students. In the education sector, the party supports the elimination of nationwide exams. Instead, they propose alternative evaluation methods to assess students' progress. Moreover, they recommend the enforcement of mandatory psychological tests for all active police officers, as well as security forces in general, to ensure their mental well-being and suitability for their roles. Another significant stance revolves around collaboration with UEFA to restructure the refereeing system in football. They aim to foster fair play and transparency in the sport. The party advocates for subsidies to facilitate the installation of artificial turf in every football stadium nationwide, enhancing the quality and accessibility of playing surfaces. Furthermore, the party promotes the introduction of mandatory indoor gyms in every city, encouraging a healthy and active lifestyle among citizens.

== Election results ==
=== Hellenic Parliament ===
Election	Hellenic Parliament					Rank	Government	Leader
Election	Votes	%	±pp	Seats won	+/−	Rank	Government	Leader
May 2012	18	0.00%	New	0 / 300	New	29th	Extra-parliamentary	Giorgos Betsikas
Jun 2012	12,459	0.20%	+0.20	0 / 300	0	16th	Extra-parliamentary	Giorgos Betsikas
Jan 2015	Did not contest			0 / 300	0	—	Extra-parliamentary	Theodoros Maragoudakis
Sep 2015	Did not contest			0 / 300	0	—	Extra-parliamentary	Theodoros Maragoudakis
2019	Did not contest			0 / 300	0	—	Extra-parliamentary	Theodoros Maragoudakis
May 2023	Did not contest			0 / 300	0	—	Extra-parliamentary	Ioannis Alevizos
Jun 2023	299	0.01%	−0.19	0 / 300	0	25th	Extra-parliamentary	Ioannis Alevizos
