= Louka Katseli =

Greek economist and politician

- Λούκα Κατσέλη
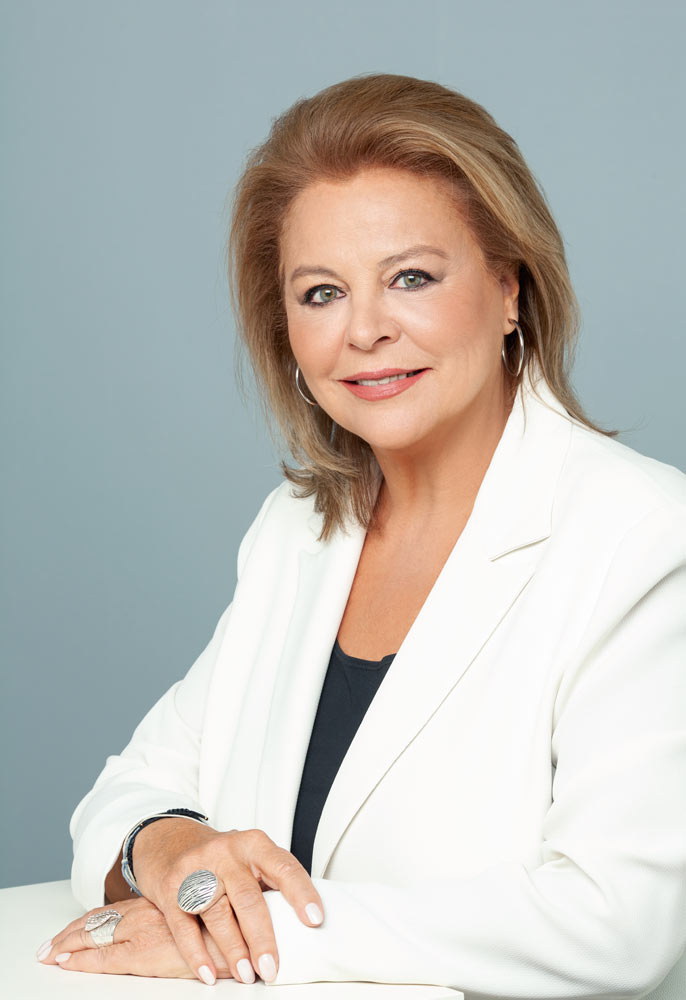
- Katseli in 2020

Minister of Labour and Social Security
- In office 7 September 2010 – 17 June 2011
- Prime Minister: George Papandreou
- Preceded by: Andreas Loverdos
- Succeeded by: Giorgos Koutroumanis

Minister for Economy, Competitiveness and Shipping
- In office 7 October 2009 – 7 September 2010
- Prime Minister: George Papandreou
- Preceded by: Kostis Hatzidakis
- Succeeded by: Michalis Chrisochoidis
Further offices held 2012–2016
Chair of the National Bank of Greece
In office 23 March 2015 – 2 November 2016
Preceded by	George Zanias
Succeeded by	Panagiotis Thomopoulos
President of the Social Agreement
In office 14 March 2012 – 23 March 2015
Preceded by	Office established
Succeeded by	Panagiotis Dimitroulopoulos

Member of the Hellenic Parliament
- In office 16 September 2007 – 11 April 2012
- Constituency: Athens B

Personal details
- Born: 20 April 1952 (age 74) Athens, Kingdom of Greece
- Party: Syriza
- Other political affiliations: Social Agreement (2012–2019); PASOK (1976–2012)
- Spouse: Gerasimos Arsenis (died 2016)
- Children: 2
- Education: Princeton University (BEc)
- Occupation: Politician; Economist
- Website: LoukaKatseli.gr

Louka Katseli (Greek: Λούκα Κατσέλη, pronounced [ˈluka kaˈtseli]; born 20 April 1952) is a Greek politician and economist. She is Professor Emerita at the National and Kapodistrian University of Athens. She served as chair of the National Bank of Greece from 2015 to 2016, as Minister for Economy, Competitiveness and Shipping from 2009 to 2010 and as Minister of Labour and Social Security from 2010 to 2011. In January 2025 she was proposed as a candidate for the Greek Presidency in the 2025 Greek presidential election with the support of Syriza.

== Biography ==
=== Early life and education ===
Louka Katseli is the daughter of Greek actress Αleka Katseli, and stage director Pelopidas Katselis.

She is also the sister of actress and former politician Nora Katseli.

Louka Katseli graduated from Smith College in Northampton, Massachusetts in 1972, with a B.A. in economics (cum laude) and from the Woodrow Wilson School of Public and International Affairs at Princeton University in 1974 with an MPA (Master of Public Administration). She continued her studies at Princeton, receiving a M.A. in economics in 1975 followed by a Ph.D. in economics in 1978. Her doctoral dissertation was titled "Transmission of external price disturbances in small, open economies."

=== Academic career ===
Louka Katseli began her academic career in 1977 as an assistant professor of economics at Yale University and was subsequently promoted to associate professor of economics at the School of Organization and Management (1977–1985). She subsequently served as visiting professor at Birkbeck College, London (1986) and at the Athens University of Economics and Business in 1986–1987. In 1987, she was elected Professor of Economics at the National and Kapodistrian University of Athens, position which she held until her retirement in 2019. She presently holds the title of Professor Emeritus. In 2017, she was elected Honorary Professor of the University of Patras.

She has served as a member of the executive committee of the European Association of Development Institutes (E.A.D.I), a member of the Scientific Advisory Board of the German Institute for Economic Research in Berlin, Germany, Chair of the International Advisory Board of the Athens Development and Governance Institute (ADGI – INERPOST) and a member of the Euro 50 group. She has been the author of four books and more than 40 articles in professional journals and books on international and institutional economics, development finance and migration. In 2015 she was a member of the Editorial Team of the 5th European Report on Development (ERD).

=== Professional career ===
Louka Katseli has served as Director General of the Center of Planning and Economic Research (KEPE) in Athens (1982–1986), member of the Council of Economic Advisors (1982–1984 and 1993–1996), Special Economic Advisor to Prime Minister of Greece Andreas Papandreou, (1993–1996) and Special Advisor to the Minister of Education (1996-1997). From 2003 to 2007, Louka Katseli was appointed Director of the OECD Development Centre in France. In March 2015 she was elected chair of the Board of Directors of the National Bank of Greece (3/15 – 11/16) and Chair of the Hellenic Bank Association (4/15 – 11/16). She has also served as a member of the European Commission's Economic and Monetary Policy Committee (1983–1986), member of the "Commite des Sages" for the Revision of the European Social Charter (1995–1997), a member of the European Commission's advisory board for "Science, Technology, Social Cohesion in the wider Continental Europe" (1991–1992) and Advisor to various Directorates of the European Commission. She was a member and Vice President of the Committee of Development Policy of the United Nations (1996–1999) and advisor to numerous international organizations including the World Bank, the International Organization for Migration and the United Nations. As a consultant, she served as Special Economic Expert of the European Union in Moldova in the context of the "Support to the DCFTA Process in the Republic of Moldova" EU Program. Most recently, she was Vice President of the African Capacity Building Foundation (ACBF) (2016 to 2024), and member of the Independent Commission for Sustainable Equality, Progressive Alliance of Socialists and Democrats - S&D, (Progressive Society). Since 2017, she is a partner of Match2Invest, a company that promotes sustainable development and investment initiatives in Greece.

=== Governmental positions (2009–2011) ===
A member of the Panhellenic Socialist Movement (PASOK) since 1976, she was elected State Deputy in the elections of September 16, 2007 and served as economics spokesperson for the party. On October 4, 2009, she was elected Member of Parliament from the second district of Attica, a position she kept until 2012. Following the elections, she was appointed Minister of Economy, Competitiveness and Shipping until September 7, 2010. As Minister of Economy, she introduced important bills, including Law 3869/2010 on the settlement of debts of over-indebted individuals (known in Greece as the Katseli Law) and Law 3816/2010 on the restructuring of business and professional loans to credit institutions. In her capacity as Minister, she initiated major reforms including the abolition of cabotage to support home-porting, the repricing of pharmaceutical products, the simplification of business start-up procedures etc.

While in office, she also oversaw the design and implementation of four recyclable loan funds to support SMEs (the National Development Fund (ETEAN SA), Jeremie, Jessica, Save at Home Program).

In September 2010, she was appointed Minister for Labour and Social Security, a position she held until June 2011.

As Minister of Labour, she promoted the institution of Special Firm-level Collective Agreements (Law 3899/2010) and the legislative framework for the social economy and entrepreneurship. On 20 October 2011, after having refused to vote for the dismantling of collective agreements, Katseli was removed from PASOK's parliamentary group but was brought back a month later following a vote of confidence in which she supported the government.

In February 2012, she was expelled a second time from PASOK's parliamentary group after voting against Greece's second Financial Assistance Program that abolished the minimum wage and collective agreements and gave the right to Greece's creditors to seize the country's gold reserves if needed.

On 14 March 2012, she formed the new Social Pact party, together with Haris Kastanidis and five other expelled parliament members. The party took part in the elections of May 6, 2012, receiving 0.96% of the valid ballots. She remained as party head until March 2015 when she was elected Chair of the National Bank of Greece.

Since 2018, she is co-chair of the Independent Commission for Sustainable Equality, of the Progressive Alliance of Socialists and Democrats - S&D (Progressive Society). Together with her co-chair former Prime Minister of Denmark Poul Nyrup Rasmussen, she oversaw the commission's workings and the publication of its report entitled “Well-Being for Everyone in a Sustainable Europe”.

== Personal life ==
Louka Katseli was first married to Stratis Papaefstratiou and then to the late Gerasimos Arsenis, a well-known economist and former Minister. She has two children, Dimitris Papaefstratiou, now an international lawyer and Amalia Arseni, a theatre actress.

== Awards ==
She has received numerous distinctions and awards, including the Sidney Cohen Prize for Economics (1971), Phi Beta Kappa (1972), Princeton University Fellowship (1972-1974 and 1976–1977), Alexander Onassis Fellowship (1974-1976), Outstanding PhD Dissertation Award (1979), Junior Faculty Fellowship Yale University (1979-1980), Concilium Faculty Research Award (1979), German Marshall Fund Fellowship (1982-1984), Research Support by the Ford Foundation, the A.P. Sloan Foundation and CEPR (1986-1988).

== Publications ==
- Transmission of External Price Disturbances in Small Open Economies, Ph.D. dissertation published by Garland Press in their series of Outstanding Dissertations in Economics, 1979
- Foreign Investment and Trade Linkages in Developing Countries, United Nations, ST/CTC/154, Sales No. E.93. II. A.12, April 1993
- Macroeconomic Analysis and the Greek Economy (with X. Magoula), Typothito-Dardanos, 2002 (in Greek)
- «Nominal Tax Rates and the Effectiveness of Fiscal Policy». National Tax Journal, March 1979
- «The Reemergence of Purchasing Power Parity in the 1970s», Special Paper in International Finance #13, International Finance Section, Princeton University, December 1979
- «Income Instability, Terms of Trade and the Choice of Exchange-Rate Regime» with William H. Branson) Journal of Development Economics, 7, March, 1980, 49 -69
- «The Impact of Greece’s Entry in the EEC on Greek-American Relations», in T. Couloumbis and J. Iatrides (eds.) Greek-American Relations, Pella, 1980.
- «Transmission of External Price Disturbances and the Composition of Trade», Journal of International Economics, August, 1980
- «Exchange Rate Policy in Less Developed Countries», (with William H. Branson) in S. Grassman and Lundberg (eds.), The World Economic Order: Past and Prospects, Macmillan Press, 1981
- «Currency Baskets and Real Effective Exchange Rates», (with William H. Branson) in Mark Gersovitz et al. (eds.), The Theory and Experience of Economic Development; Essays in Honor of Sir W. Arthur Lewis, George Allen and Unwin Ltd., 1982.
- «Adjustment to Variations in Prices of Imported Inputs: The Role of Economic Structure» (with Nancy P. Marion), Weltwirtschaftliches Archiv. Band 118, Heft 1. 1982; also NBER Working Paper # 360, August 1980
- «Macroeconomic Adjustment and Exchange-Rate Policy in Middle-Income Countries: Greece, Portugal and Spain in the 1970s», in Marcello De Cecco (eds.) International Economic Adjustment: Small Countries and the European Economic System, Blackwell, 1983.
- «Exchange Rates and Food in the European Community», European Economic Review, 1983, Vol. 20, No. 1, 2; also Economic Growth Center Discussion Paper # 387, September, 1981
- «Devaluation: A Critical Appraisal of IMF’s Policy Prescriptions», AER: Papers and Proceedings, May 1983 (also reprinted in the BOLETIN, Centro de Estudios Monetarios Latinoamericanos, Vol. 31, No. 4, July–August 1985)
- «Real Exchange Rates in the 1970s» in John Bilson and Richard Marston (eds.), Exchange Rate Theory and Practices, University of Chicago Press, August 1984 and Economic Growth Center Discussion Paper #403, May 1982
- «Discrete Devaluation as a Signal to Price Setters: Suggested Evidence from Greece» in L. Ahamed and S. Edwards (eds.) Structural Adjustment and Exchange Rate Policy, University of Chicago Press, 1986; also NBER Working paper #1529
- «Building a Process of Democratic Planning» in T. Tzannatos (ed.), Socialism in Greece: The First Four Years, Gower, Aldershot, England, April 1986
- «Flexible Exchange Rates and their Implications for International Economic Cooperation» in M. Szabo-Pelsoczi (ed.), The Future of the International Monetary System, Institute for World Economics, Budapest, 1986
- «On the Effectiveness of Discrete Devaluation in Balance of Payments Adjustment» in R.C. Marston (ed.), Misalignment of Exchange Rates: Effects on Trade and Industry, University of Chicago Press, 1989
- «Theoretical and Empirical Determinants of International Labour Mobility: A Greek-German Perspective» (with Nicholas P. Glytsos) in I. Gordon and P Thirlwall (eds.), European Factor Mobility: Trends and Consequences, The MacMillan Press Ltd, 1989
- «The Political Economy of Macroeconomic Policy in Europe», in Guerrieri, P. and P.C Padoan (eds.), The Political Economy of International Cooperation, Wheatsheaf, 1989
- «Structural Adjustment of the Greek Economy», in C. Bliss and J. Braga de Macedo (eds.), Unity with Diversity in the European Economy: The Community's Southern Frontier, Cambridge University Press, 1990
- «North / South in the EMS: Convergence and Divergence in Inflation and Real Exchange Rates», (with J. P. Danthine, Paul de Grauwe and N. Thygesen) the CEPS Economic Policy Group, 1991
- «Investment, Trade and International Competitiveness» in J.H. Dunning and K.A. Hamdani, edts, The New Globalism and Developing Countries, United Nations University Press, 1997, pp. 181–213
- «Illegal Migration and Local Labour Markets: The Case of Northern Greece», (with Theodore P. Lianos, Alexander H. Sarris). International Migration Quarterly Review Vol. XXXIV, No 3, 1996, p.p. 449 - 483
- “The Greek Economy in the Post-Maastricht Era”, Hellenic Studies, Vol. 5, No 2, Autumn 1997
- “Financial Governance and Democratic Consolidation: The Dual Challenge of the European Union” in A. Vlachou, edt., Contemporary Economic Theory: Radical Critiques of Neoliberalism, Macmillan Press, 1999, p.p. 159-172
- “The Internationalisation of Southern European Economies”, in H. Gibson, edt., Economic Transformation, Democratisation and Integration into Europe: The Case of Southern Europe, Palgrave Publishers, 2001
- “European Integration and the Need for Democratic Reconsolidation”, in Pelagidis Th, J. Milios and L.T. Katseli, eds, Welfare State and Democracy in Crisis, Ashgate, 2000. Also in J. Milios, L. Katseli and Th. Pelagidis, edts, Rethinking Democracy and the Welfare State, Ellinika Grammata, 1999, pp. 83–94
- “Immigrants and EU Labor Markets” in Migration Policy in Europe: Present Challenges-Future Prospects, AMPI, Washington, 2003, forthcoming
- Searching for Alternatives - Beyond the Washington Consensus, (in G. Schmalisch and J. Müller), International Policy Dialogue series of InWEnt, Berlin, September 2004
- “Greek Migration: The Two Faces of Janus” (with N. Glytsos) in K. Zimmerman, edt. European Migration: “What do We Know?”, Oxford University Press, 2005
- “Giving Aid Teeth”, Development and Cooperation, volume 32, n° 1, January 2005. Also in The ICC Guide to Corporate Social Responsibility, 2005
- The Role of Conditionality in Policy-Based Lending, International Policy Dialogue series of InWEnt, Berlin, April 2005
- Migration, Aid & Trade: Policy Coherence for Development (with J. Dayton- Johnson), Policy Brief n° 28, OECD Development Centre, 2006
- Effects of Migration on Sending Countries: What do we know? (with R.E.B. Lucas and T. Xenogiani), Working paper n° 250, OECD Development Centre, June 2006
- Policies for Migration and Development: A European Perspective (with R.E.B. Lucas and T. Xenogiani), Policy Brief n° 30, OECD Development Centre, 2006
- Migration: a Negative or a Positive Driver for Development? (with T. Xenogiani), Policy Insight n° 29, OECD Development Centre, 2006
- Bridging Research and Policy – What Role for EADI? (with C. Foy) European Association of Development Research and Training Institutes, Newsletter 2, 2006
- EU Policy Coherence on Security and Development: A new Agenda for Research and Policy-making, in Hans Guenter Brauch, et al. edts., Globalisation and Environmental Challenges, Vol. 1, Chapter 60 of Part VII on Institutional Security Concepts Revisited for the 21st Century, Springer, 2007

== Sources ==
- Curriculum Vitae of Louka Katseli
- Biography of Louka Katseli in the Official Website of the Hellenic Parliament (in Greek) - (in English)
- Louka Katseli in the K.E.P.P. Conference (in English)
- Louka Katseli in the E.A.D.I. Website (in English)
- Curriculum Vitae of Louka Katseli in the United Nations Website (in English)
