= Directorate General for National Security =

Directorate General for National Security may refer to:

- Algerian police
- Sûreté Nationale (Morocco)
- National Security Service (Greece)

== See also ==
- Sûreté, the organizational title of a civil police force in many French-speaking countries or regions
- Directorate-General for External Security, France
- General Directorate for Internal Security, France
- General Directorate of General Security, Lebanon
- National Directorate of Security, Afghanistan
- Directorate of General Security, Iraq
- Directorate General for Public Security, Austria
- General Directorate of Security (Portugal)
- Main Directorate of State Security, USSR
