= Hellenic Police =

Greek law enforcement and security agency

Hellenic Police Ελληνική Αστυνομία Elliniki Astynomia
- Abbreviation: ΕΛΑΣ

Agency overview
- Formed: 1 November 1984; 42 years ago
- Preceding agencies: Hellenic Gendarmerie; Cities Police; Rural Police; YPEA

Jurisdictional structure
- National agency: Greece
- Operations jurisdiction: Greece
- Governing body: Government of Greece
- Constituting instrument: Law 1481/1-10-1984
- General nature: Civilian police

Operational structure
- Overseen by: Ministry of Citizen Protection
- Headquarters: Athens, Greece
- Sworn members: 57,500
- Unsworn members: 10,000
- Agency executives: Lieutenant General Dimitrios Mallios, Chief of the Hellenic Police; Lieutenant General Panagiotis Poupouzas, First Deputy Chief of the Hellenic Police (Deputy of Operations); Lieutenant General Ioannis Skouras, Second Deputy Chief of the Hellenic Police (Deputy of Staff)
- General Regional Police Directorates: 14
- Police Directorates: 56

Notables
- Anniversary: St. Artemius feast day (Annually, 20 October)

Website
- www.astynomia.gr

The Hellenic Police (Greek: Ελληνική Αστυνομία, romanized: Ellinikí Astynomía, abbreviated ΕΛ.ΑΣ.) is the national police service and one of the three security forces of Greece (the others being the Hellenic Fire Service and the Hellenic Coast Guard). It is a large agency with responsibilities ranging from road traffic control to counter-terrorism. Police Lieutenant General Dimitrios Mallios is Chief of the Hellenic Police. He replaced Lazaros Mavropoulos in January 2024. The Hellenic Police force was established in 1984 under Law 1481/1-10-1984 (Government Gazette 152/A/8-10-1984) as the result of the merger of the Gendarmerie (Χωροφυλακή, Chorofylakí, 1833–1984) and the Cities Police (Αστυνομία Πόλεων, Astynomía Póleon, 1921–1984) forces.

According to Law 7187/2025 which reorganized, upgraded and modernized the Hellenic Police's structure, mission and modus operandi, replacing the previous Law 2800/2000, the Hellenic Police is a security force whose primary missions are:

- the Protection of the State, including
  - The Protection of the Democratic Regime and the State Institutions
  - The Neutralization of Threats which Risk the State's Security
  - The Protection of State Officials, Local and Foreign, who are Located in the Country
  - The Inspection of Compliance with Laws regarding Weapons and Explosive Devices
  - The Tackling of Terrorism and Extremist Violence
- Public Security, including
  - The Prosecution of Crimes Against Life & Personal Freedom and Property Crimes
  - The Prosecution of Cybercrime
  - The Prosecution of Narcotics Trafficking
  - The Prosecution of Illegal Trade and Antiquities Smuggling
  - The Prosecution of Human Trafficking
  - The Prosecution of Financial Crime
  - The Prosecution of Domestic and Transborder Organized Crime
  - The Search for Missing Persons, as well as for Lost and Stolen Items
  - The Search and Arrest of Prosecuted Persons
- General and Traffic Policing, including
  - The Assurance of Social Peace and Citizen Protection
  - The Maintenance of Order in Public Spaces and Public Gatherings and the Protection of the Personal and Collective Rights of Citizens during said Conditions
  - The Inspection of the Lawful Operation of Stores
  - The Transport of Prisoners from Detention Facilities to the Courts of Law
  - The Inspection of Compliance with Tourist Laws
  - The Regulation of Traffic in Public Spaces
  - The Enforcement of Traffic Laws and Regulations
  - The Investigation of Traffic Accidents
- Community Policing, including
  - The Protection of Human Rights and the Fundamental Freedoms secured by the Constitution
  - The Protection of Family Integrity and the Tackling of Domestic Violence
  - The Tackling of Gender-Based Violence
  - The Tackling of Hate Crimes, specifically the Prosecution of Offences against Persons or Groups due to their race, skin color, ethnic descent, religion, disability, sexual orientation and gender identity or characteristics
  - The Protection of Underage or other Vulnerable Individuals
- Foreigners Policing and Border Protection, including
  - The Prevention, Deterrence and Suppression of Illegal Entry and Exit of Foreign Citizens to the Country, as well as their Illegal Employment
  - The Tracking and Arrest of Foreign Citizens who Enter, Exit, Reside and Work Illegally in the Country and their Referral to the Judicial Authorities or their Repatriation, as well as the Tracking and Arrest of Persons who Illegally Traffic or Facilitate the Illegal Entry, Exit and Employment of the Foreign Persons and their Referral to the Judicial Authorities
  - The Detention of Foreigners who have Illegally Entered or Reside in the Country in Specific Detention Facilities

The Hellenic Police is constituted along central and regional lines. The force takes direction from the Minister for Citizen Protection.

== Structure ==
=== Overview ===
Attica General Police Directorate

The Hellenic Police force is headed in a de jure sense by the Minister for Citizen Protection (in a similar way that many US Police Departments give an elected civilian the role of Commissioner), and although the Minister sets the general policy direction of Greece's stance towards law and order as a whole, the Chief of Police is the day-to-day head of the force. Underneath the Chief of Police is the First Deputy Chief (Deputy of Operations), who oversees and coordinates all Operations and Special Police Forces across the country in accordance to the Chief's orders and ensures the police force is adequately prepared to handle all types of incidents and crises. In addition, in the event of the Chief of Police being unable to assume his duties, they will take over as the interim head. Underneath the First Deputy Chief is the Second Deputy Chief (Deputy of Staff), who heads the five Staff General Directorates of the Hellenic Police, which in turn coordinate all central and regional services of the force in order to ensure the enforcement of its five primary missions. The Policing and Security General Directorate is by far the most important, and includes the Policing Directorate, the Community Policing Directorate, the Public Security Directorate, the State Security Directorate (a directorate protecting the state and its interests equivalent to the NSA in the US, which replaced the National Security Service after its abolition in 1984), the Passports and Other Security Documents Directorate and the International Police Cooperation Directorate. Equal in rank to the Chief and the Deputy Chiefs, are the General Police Coordinators of Southern and Northern Greece, who have under their jurisdiction the regional services of both these administrative divisions.

=== Regional jurisdiction ===
Greece is divided into two sectors for policing, both headed by a General Police Coordinator with the rank of Lieutenant General. These sectors both contain several regions, headed by Regional Directors, usually with the rank of Major General or sometimes with the rank of Brigadier General.

Southern Greece (General Police Coordinator: Lt. Gen. Nikolaos Spiridakis)

- Attica Region – (Regional Director: Maj. Gen. Athanasios Kampras)
- Central Greece region – (Regional Director: Brig. Gen. Konstantinos Pelekanos)
- Peloponnese region – (Regional Director: Maj. Gen. Elias Axiotopoulos)
- West Greece region – (Regional Director: Maj. Gen. Theodoros Tsatsaris)
- Ionian Islands region – (Regional Director: Maj. Gen. Dimitrios Voulgaris)
- South Aegean region – (Regional Director: Maj. Gen. Loukas Thanos)
- Crete region – (Regional Director: Maj. Gen. Georgios Doukis)

Northern Greece (General Police Coordinator: Lt. Gen. Georgios Papadopoulos)

- Thessaloniki region – (Regional Director: Maj. Gen. Georgios Tzimas)
- East Macedonia and Thrace region – (Regional Director: Brig. Gen. Lampros Tsiaras)
- Central Macedonia region – (Regional Director: Brig. Gen. Fani Giouvannopoulou)
- West Macedonia region – (Regional Director: Brig. Gen. Nikolaos Exarchos)
- Thessaly region – (Regional Director: Brig. Gen. Georgios Dizes)
- Epirus region – (Regional Director: Maj. Gen. Konstantinos Kakousis)
- North Aegean region – (Regional Director: Maj. Gen. Michael Sevdynidis)

Note: While Thessaloniki is not considered a region from a geographical and administrative standpoint, the Thessaloniki General Police Directorate operates as a General Regional Police Directorate and is considered the Hellenic Police's "Northern Greece HQ".

=== Directorates and Services ===
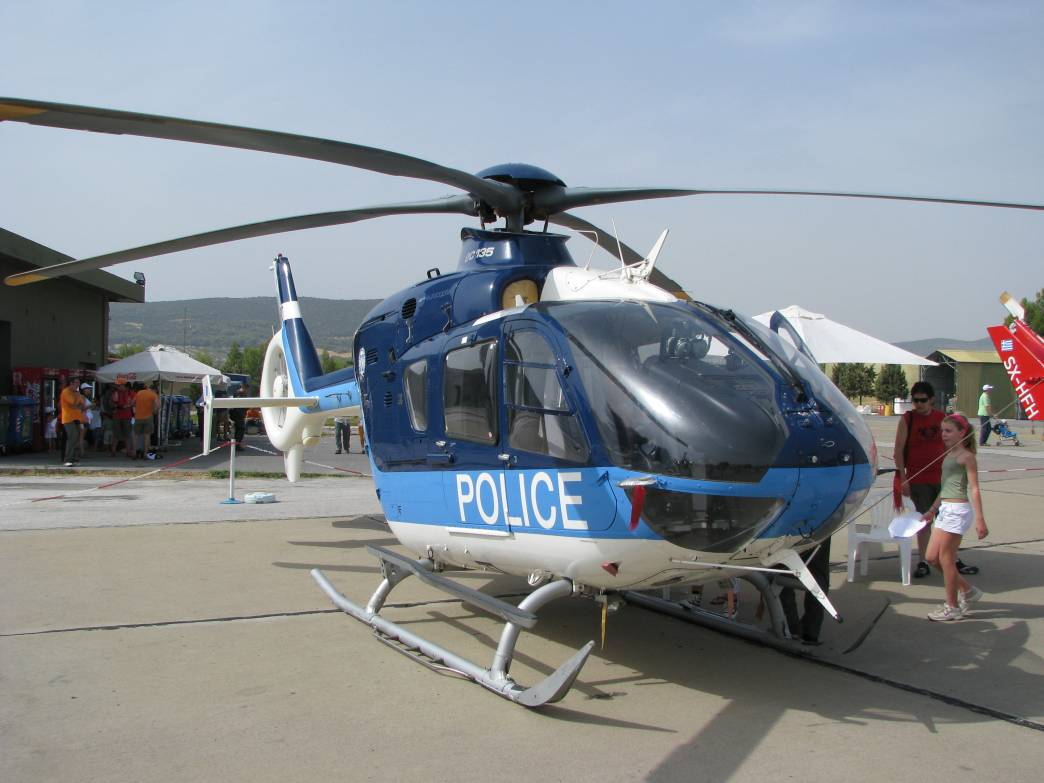
Greek police helicopter

The Hellenic Police force has several Independent Central Services under the authority of the Chief of Police (called Special Investigative Directorates with national investigative jurisdiction, which work in conjunction with regional and other police services where necessary) and the 2 Deputy Chiefs (either Operational or Staff Directorates which mostly oversee and coordinate the various regional services and units). These Directorates are usually headed by Major Generals and Brigadier Generals. They are as follows:

Overseen by the Chief of Police:

- Intelligence Management and Analysis Directorate (ΔΙ.Δ.Α.Π. – Διεύθυνση Διαχείρισης και Ανάλυσης Πληροφοριών – Dieufthinsi Diacheirisis kai Analysis Pliroforion) – This Directorate as well as all its Regional Departments compile, manage and analyze every piece of intelligence gathered by the different police services around the country and collaborate closely with the National Intelligence Service of Greece in order to create comprehensive profiles for criminals and criminal organizations and assist investigative services in their work – (Director: Brig. Gen. Kyriakos Dimitriou)
  - Subdirectorate of Intelligence Management and Analysis of Northern Greece
  - Regional Departments of Intelligence Management and Analysis
- Organized Crime Directorate (Δ.Α.Ο.Ε. – Διεύθυνση Αντιμετώπισης Οργανωμένου Εγκλήματος – Dieufthinsi Antimetopisis Organomenou Egklimatos) – The newest directorate of the Hellenic Police, which started operating on October 21, 2024, and has been dubbed the "Greek FBI", with the duty to combat Organized Crime across the country. It is headquartered in Attica, but there also operates the Subdirectorate of Organized Crime of Northern Greece in Thessaloniki and the Subdirectorate of Organized Crime of Crete in Heraklion. – (Director: Maj. Gen. Photis Ntouitsis)
  - Subdirectorate of Narcotics
    - General Investigations and International Cooperation Department
    - Cocaine Department
    - Heroin Department
    - Cannabis and Synthetic Drugs Department
    - Athens International Airport Narcotics Department
  - Subdirectorate of Property Crimes and Crimes Against Life
    - Crimes Against Life and Personal Freedom Department (colloquially known as Homicide Department)
    - Property Crimes Department
    - Extortion Crimes Department
  - Subdirectorate of Human Trafficking and Illegal Items Trafficking
    - Human Trafficking Department
    - Illegal Items Trafficking Department
    - National Cultural Heritage and Antiquities Protection Department
  - Subdirectorate of Financial Crimes
    - Public Property and European Resources Protection Department
    - Private Property Protection Department
    - Economy Protection Department
    - Insurance Fraud Department
    - Tax Affairs Department
  - Subdirectorate of Organized Athletic Violence
    - Sports Games Protection Department
    - Special Investigations Department
    - Intelligence Department
  - Subdirectorate of Intelligence and Operations
    - Intelligence Management and Strategy Analysis Department
      - Intelligence Management and Operational Analysis Office
      - Strategic Analysis Office
      - Intelligence Systems Office
    - Technical Applications Department
    - Witness Protection Department
    - Special Interrogations Department
    - Special Operational Units Department
      - Prevention and Mediation Units
  - Subdirectorate of Administrative Support
    - Budget Management Department
    - Inventory and Gear Management Department
    - Technical Support Department
    - Processing Department
  - Subdirectorate of Organized Crime of Northern Greece
    - Department of Narcotics
    - Department of Property Crimes and Crimes against Life
    - Department of Human Trafficking and Illegal Items Trafficking
    - Department of Financial Crime
    - Department of Organized Athletic Violence
    - Department of Intelligence and Operations
    - Department of Administrative Support
  - Subdirectorate of Organized Crime of Crete
    - Department of Narcotics
    - Department of Special Criminal Activities
      - Special Operational Units Office
    - Department of Human Trafficking and Illegal Items Trafficking
    - Department of Financial Crime
    - Department of Intelligence and Administrative Support
      - Intelligence Management Office
      - Technical Support Office
- Special Violent Crimes (Counter-Terrorism) Directorate (Δ.Α.Ε.Ε.Β. – Διεύθυνση Αντιμετώπισης Ειδικών Εγκλημάτων Βίας (Αντιτρομοκρατική Υπηρεσία) – Dieufthinsi Antimetopisis Eidikon Egklimaton Vias (Antitromokratiki Ypiresia)) – (Director: Maj. Gen. Miltiadis Siafis)
  - Domestic Terrorism Department
  - International Terrorism Department
  - State and Democracy Protection Department
  - Operations and Special Inspections Department
  - Administrative Support Department
  - Intelligence Management Department
  - Subdirectorate of Special Violent Crimes of Northern Greece
- Cyber Crime Directorate (ΔΙ.ΔΙ.Κ – Διεύθυνση Δίωξης Κυβερνοεγκλήματος – Dieufthinsi Dioxis Kybernoegklimatos) – (Director: Brig. Gen. Basileios Mpertanos)
  - Telecommunications & Digital Transactions Safety and Software & Copyright Protection Department
  - Juvenile Online Protection Department
  - Special Cases and Digital Investigations Department
  - Online Financial Crimes Department
  - Innovative Actions and Strategies Department
  - Administrative Support and Intelligence Management Department
  - Subdirectorate of Cyber Crime of Northern Greece
- Forensic Investigations Directorate (Δ.Ε.Ε. – Διεύθυνση Εγκληματολογικών Ερευνών – Dieufthinsi Egklimatologikon Ereunon) – (Director: Maj. Gen. Spyridon Laskos)
  - Subdirectorate of Biological and Biochemical Tests and Analyses
    - Biological Materials Analysis Department
      - DNA Evidence Analysis Laboratory
      - Human Identification Laboratory
    - National Genetics Database Department
    - Administrative Support Department
    - Scientific Support Department
  - Subdirectorate of Crime Scene Investigation and Fingerprint Examination
    - Crime Scene Investigations Department
    - Fingerprint Examination Department
    - Forensic Photography Department
    - Administrative Support Department
  - Subdirectorate of Laboratories
    - Firearms and Other Instrument Traces Laboratories Department
      - Firearms and Ammunition Technology Laboratory
      - Comparative Ballistic Examinations Laboratory
      - Instrument Traces Examination Laboratory
      - Vehicle Examination - Identification Laboratory
      - Keys and Locks Examination Laboratory
    - Forensic Graphology and Document and Currency Forgery Laboratories Department
      - Forensic Graphology Laboratory
      - Document and Currency Forgery and Counterfeiting Examination Laboratory
    - Chemical and Physic Examinations Department
      - Toxicology Laboratory
      - Glass, Plastics, Synthetic Textile Fibers and Dyes Examination Laboratory
      - Gunshot Residue Examination Laboratory
      - Makeshift Explosive Devices Analysis Laboratory
      - Makeshift Incendiary Devices Analysis Laboratory
      - Makeshift Explosive and Incendiary Devices and other Electronic Circuits Technology Laboratory
      - Pyrotechnics Laboratory
    - Administrative Support Department
  - Subdirectorate of Digital Forensic Investigation and Analysis
    - Digital Data Management and Quality Control Department
    - Digital Evidence Examination Department
      - Digital Evidence Examination and Analysis Laboratory
      - Data Recovery and Analysis from Non-Functional Digital Systems Laboratory
    - Audiovisual and Photographical Evidence Analysis Department
      - Video and Imagery Examination Laboratory
      - Voice and Audio Examination Laboratory
    - Management of the National Database of Sexual Exploitation Records of Minors Department
  - Subdirectorate of Forensic Investigations of Northern Greece
  - Regional Departments and Offices of Forensic Investigations

Overseen by the First Deputy Chief (Deputy of Operations):

- Government Officials and other Susceptible Targets Protection General Directorate (Γενική Διεύθυνση Προστασίας Επισήμων και άλλων Ευπαθών Στόχων – Geniki Dieufthinsi Prostasias Episimon kai allon Eufpathon Stochon) – (Director: Maj. Gen. Marinos Stagakis)
  - President Protection Service (Υπηρεσία Προστασίας του Προέδρου της Δημοκρατίας – Ypiresia Prostasias tou Proedrou tis Dimokratias) – Equivalent of the US Secret Service
  - Prime Minister Protection Service (Υπηρεσία Προστασίας Προέδρου της Κυβέρνησης – Ypiresia Prostasias Proedrou tis Kybernisis)
  - Parliament Security Service (Υπηρεσία Ασφαλείας της Βουλής – Ypiresia Asfalias tis Boulis)
  - Cabinet Members and other Politicians Security Service (Υπηρεσία Ασφαλείας Μελών της Κυβέρνησης και άλλων Πολιτικών Προσώπων – Ypiresia Asfalias Melon tis Kybernisis kai allon politikon prosopon)
  - Foreign Government Officials and other Susceptible Targets Protection Service (Υπηρεσία Προστασίας Αλλοδαπών Αξιωματούχων και Ευπαθών Στόχων – Ypiresia Prostasias Allodapon Axiomatouchon Kai Eufpathon Stochon)
- Directorate of Operations and Crises Management (Διεύθυνση Επιχειρήσεων και Διαχείρησης Κρίσεων – Dieufthinsi Epicheiriseon and Diacheirisis Kriseon) – (Director: Brig. Gen. Athanasios Papadimos)
  - Coordination, Administrative and Technical Support Department
  - Operational Planning, Collaborations and Training Department
    - Police Negotiators Squad
  - Surveillance Instruments Management Department
  - Critical Infrastructure, People and Public Places Protection Department
  - Hybrid Threats and Strategic Communication Department
  - Operational Command Center
- Police Special Forces Directorate (Δ.Ε.Α.Δ – Διεύθυνση Ειδικών Αστυνομικών Δυνάμεων – Dieufthinsi Eidikon Astynomikon Dynameon) – (Director: Maj. Gen. Panagiotis Dimakareas)
  - Special Suppressive Antiterrorist Unit (E.K.A.M. – Ειδική Κατασταλτική Αντιτρομοκρατική Μονάδα – Eidiki Katastaltiki Antitromokratiki Monada) – Equivalent of the American SWAT
  - Subdirectorate of Explosive Devices Disposal and K-9 Operators (Υποδιεύθυνση Εξουδετέρωσης Εκρηκτικών Μηχανισμών και Συνοδών Αστυνομικών Σκύλων - Ypodieufthinsi Exoudeterosis Ekriktikon Mechanismon kai Synodon Astynomikon Skylon)
    - Department of Explosive Devices Disposal (Τ.Ε.Ε.Μ. – Τμήμα Εξουδετέρωσης Εκρηκτικών Μηχανισμών - Tmima Exoudeterosis Ekriktikon Mechanismon)
      - Regional Bomb Squad Units
    - Department of K-9 Operators (Τμήμα Συνοδών Αστυνομικών Σκύλων - Tmima Synodon Astynomikon Skylon)
      - Regional K-9 Units
  - Subdirectorate of Special Police Forces of Northern Greece
- Hellenic Police Air Force Directorate (Δ.Ε.Μ.Ε.Α. - Διεύθυνση Εναερίων Μέσων Ελληνικής Αστυνομίας – Dieufthinsi Enaerion Meson Ellinikis Astynomias) – This used to be part of the Police Special Forces Directorate, but got promoted to a standalone Directorate in 2016. – (Director: Brig. Gen. Georgios Darmas)
  - Subdirectorate of Manned Aircraft (Υποδιεύθυνση Επανδρωμένων Αεροσκαφών – Ypodieufthinsi Epandromenon Aeroskafon) – It is equipped with 5 Helicopters in Attica and Thessaloniki.
  - Subdirectorate of Unmanned Aircraft (Υποδιεύθυνση μη Επανδρωμένων Αεροσκαφών – Ypodieufthinsi mi Epandromenon Aeroskafon) – Despite the scarcity of helicopters and their exclusive presence in Attica and Thessaloniki, some Police Directorates in the country's largest cities have equipped drones to assist operations, especially search and rescue as well as border patrol. This Subdirectorate also maintains 2 Israeli ThunderB-Spylite aircraft, on top of several drones.
  - Subdirectorate of Police Air Force of Northern Greece

Overseen by the Second Deputy Chief (Deputy of Staff):

- Staff Coordination General Directorate (Γενική Διεύθυνση Επιτελικού Συντονισμού – Geniki Dieufthinsi Epitelikou Syntonismou) - (Director: Maj. Gen. Konstantinos Platias)
  - Organization and Legal Support Directorate (Διεύθυνση Οργάνωσης και Νομικής Υποστήριξης – Dieufthinsi Organosis kai Nomikis Ypostirixis)
    - Organization Department
    - Legal Affairs Department
    - Collection and Processing of Legal Documents Department
  - Strategic Planning Directorate (Διεύθυνση Στρατηγικού Σχεδιασμού – Dieufthinsi Stratigikou Schediasmou)
    - Strategic and Long-Term Planning Department
    - Research and Innovation Department
    - Department of Funds
  - Communication Directorate (Διεύθυνση Επικοινωνίας – Dieufthinsi Epikoinonias)
    - Media Affairs Department
    - Customs, Public Relations and Retired Police Personnel Support Department
    - Publications Department
    - Hellenic Police Marching Band
    - Hellenic Police History Department
    - Physical Education and Sports Department
    - Coordination Department
    - Civilian Communication and Administrative Support Department
- Security and Policing General Directorate (Γενική Διεύθυνση Ασφάλειας και Αστυνόμευσης – Geniki Dieyfthinsi Asfaleias kai Astynomeufsis) – (Director: Brig. Gen. Eleutherios Chardalias)
  - Policing Directorate (Διεύθυνση Αστυνομεύσης – Dieufthinsi Astynomeusis)
    - General Policing Department
    - Operational Planning and Civil Protection Department
    - Traffic Measures and Operations Department
    - Road Traffic Data Analysis and Civilian Awareness Department
  - Community Policing Directorate (Διεύθυνση Κοινωνικής Αστυνόμευσης – Dieufthinsi Koinonikis Astynomeufsis)
    - Human Rights and Vulnerable Individuals Protection Department
    - Domestic Violence Department
    - Juvenile Protection Department
    - Hate Crimes Department
    - Gender-based Violence Department
    - Animals Protection Department
  - Public Security Directorate (Διεύθυνση Δημόσιας Ασφάλειας – Dieufthinsi Dimosias Asfaleias)
    - Data Collection and Analysis Department
    - Organized Crime Department
    - Suppression of Crime Department
    - Administrative Affairs Department
  - State Protection Directorate (Διεύθυνση Προστασίας του Κράτους – Dieufthinsi Prostasias tou Kratous)
    - Intelligence and Security Department
    - Vulnerable Targets Protection Department
    - Extremism and Terrorism Suppression Department
    - Illegal Weapons and Explosive Devices Department
    - IDs and Archive Department
  - International Police Cooperation Directorate (Διεύθυνση Διεθνούς Αστυνομικής Συνεργασίας – Dieufthinsi Diethnous Astynomikis Synergasias)
    - Mission and Staff Support Department
    - European and International Relations and Diplomacy Department
    - SIRENE Department
    - INTERPOL Department
    - EUROPOL Department
  - Passports and Other Security Documents Directorate (Διεύθυνση Διαβατηρίων και Άλλων Εγγράφων Ασφαλείας – Dieufthinsi Diavatirion kai Allon Eggrafon Asfaleias)
    - Data Entry and Processing Department
    - Inspection and Approval Department
    - Printing and Quality Assurance Department
    - Digitalization Department
    - Hardware Management Department
- Border Protection, Immigration Management and Foreign Persons General Directorate (Γενική Διεύθυνση Προστασίας Συνόρων, Διαχείρισης Μετανάστευσης και Αλλοδαπών – Geniki Dieufthinsi Prostasias Synoron, Diacheirisis Metanasteusis kai Allodapon) – (Director: Brig. Gen. Zambia Gypari)
  - Border Protection Directorate (Διεύθυνση Προστασίας Συνόρων – Dieufthinsi Prostasias Synoron)
    - Border Surveillance Department
    - Border Control Department
  - Immigration Management Directorate (Διεύθυνση Διαχείρισης Μετανάστευσης – Dieufthinsi Diacheirisis Metanasteusis)
    - Immigrants' Legitimacy Inspection Department
    - Detention Facilities Management Department
  - Foreign Persons Directorate (Διεύθυνση Αλλοδαπών – Dieufthinsi Allodapon)
    - Citizenship, Expatriates and Citizens of the European Union Department
    - Administrative Measures Department
- Human Resources Management General Directorate (Γενική Διεύθυνση Διαχείρισης Ανθρώπινου Δυναμικού – Geniki Dieufthinsi Diacheirisis Anthropinou Dinamikou) – (Director: Brig. Gen. Dimitrios Polyzos)
  - Uniformed Personnel Directorate (Διεύθυνση Ένστολου Προσωπικού – Dieufthinsi Enstolou Prosopikou)
    - Commissioned Officers Department
    - Lower-Ranking Uniformed Officers Department
  - Civilian Personnel Directorate (Διεύθυνση Πολιτικού Προσωπικού – Dieufthinsi Politikou Prosopikou)
    - Permanent Civilian Personnel Department
    - Civilian Personnel with Private Employment Relationship Department
    - Civilian Personnel Training-Evaluation Department
    - Disciplinary Conduct Department
  - Education and Human Resources Development Directorate (Διεύθυνση Εκπαίδευσης και Ανάπτυξης Ανθρωπίνων Πόρων – Dieufthinsi Ekpaideufsis kai Anaptyxis Anthropinon Poron)
    - Education and Training Department
    - Lifelong Learning and International Training Department
  - Health and Safety Directorate (Διεύθυνση Υγειονομικού – Dieufthinsi Ygeionomikou) – (Director: Maj. Gen. Georgios Poulianos)
    - Healthcare Department
    - Health and Safety Control Department
    - Administrative Support Department
- Support General Directorate (Γενική Διεύθυνση Υποστήριξης – Geniki Dieufthinsi Ypostiriksis) – (Director: Maj. Gen. Sotirios Nikolakopoulos)
  - Informatics Systems and Digital Governance Directorate (Διεύθυνση Πληροφοριακών Συστημάτων και Ψηφιακής Διακυβέρνησης – Dieufthinsi Pliroforiakon Systimaton kai Psifiakis Diakybernisis)
    - Budgeting and Project Monitoring Department
    - Digital Services Design and Development Department
    - Operational Function Department
    - Informational Security and Privacy Department
    - IT Support Department
  - Communications and Networking Directorate (Διεύθυνση Επικοινωνιών και Δικτύων – Dieufthinsi Epikoinonion kai Diktyon)
    - Central Infrastructure and Operational Systems Department
    - Regional Terminal Equipment and Networks Department
    - Planning and Security Department
  - Infrastructure and Technical Means Directorate (Διεύθυνση Υποδομών και Τεχνικών Μέσων – Dieufthinsi Ypodomon kai Technikon Meson)
    - Technical Support Subdirectorate
      - Means of Transportation Department
      - Weaponry Department
      - General and Personal Gear Department
      - Infrastructure Department
    - Maintenance and Applications Subdirectorate
      - Administrative Support Department
      - Transport Department
      - Drivers Training Department
      - General Maintenance Department
  - Financial Support Directorate (Διεύθυνση Οικονομικής Υποστηρίξης – Dieufthinsi Oikonomikis Ypostirksis)
    - Budget Monitoring Department
    - Service Vehicle and Gear Ascription Department
    - Uniformed Personnel Salary and Insurance Department
    - Civilian Personnel Salary and Insurance Department
  - Fixed Advances Directorate (Διεύθυνση Πάγιας Προκαταβολής – Dieufthinsi Pagias Prokatavolis)
    - Accounting Department
    - Civilian Personnel Travel Expenses Department
  - Administrative Support Directorate (Διεύθυνση Διοικητικής Μέριμνας – Dieufthinsi Dioikitikis Merimnas)
    - Administration Department
    - Budget-Inventory Management Department
    - Police HQ Guarding Department

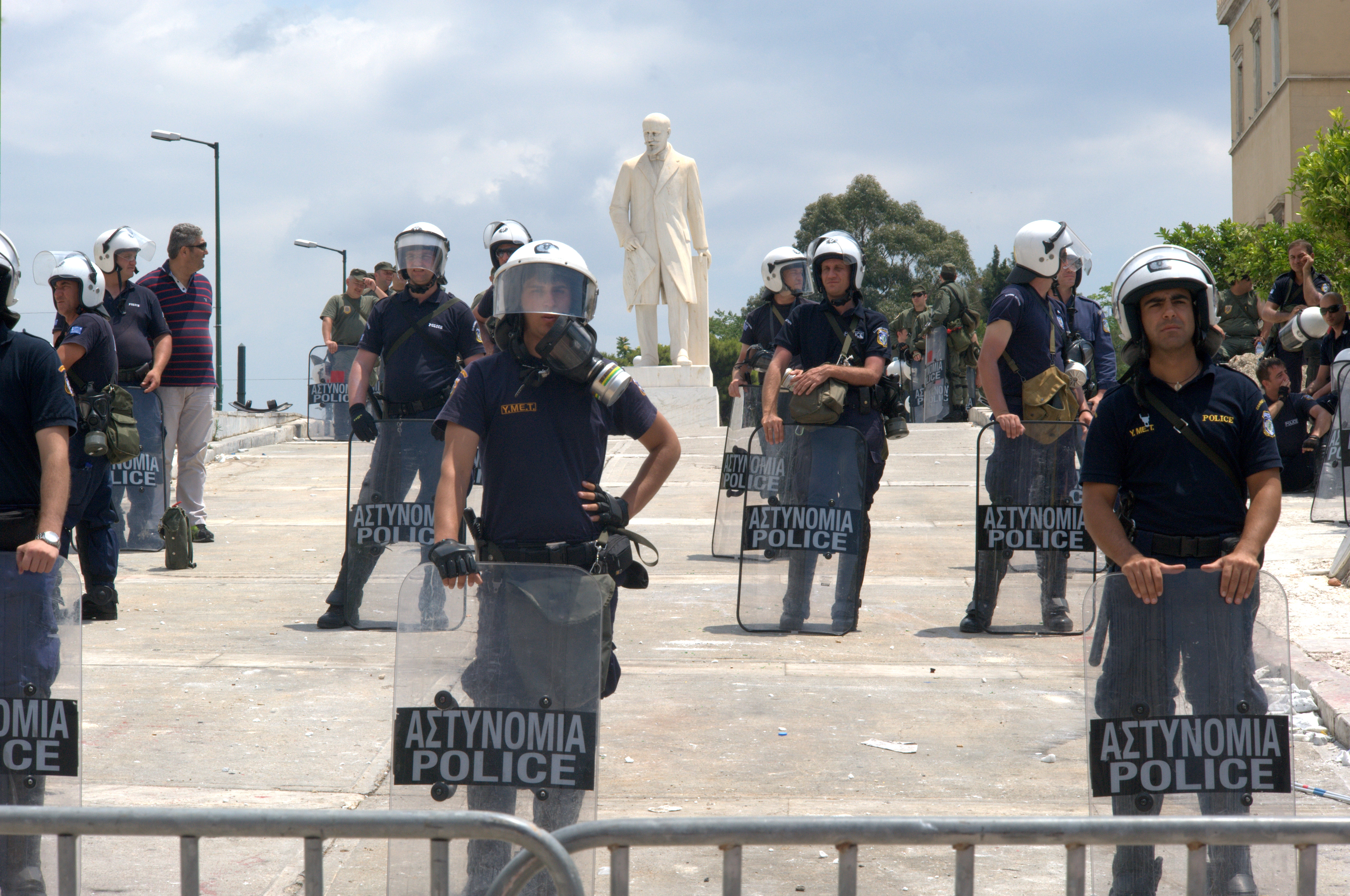
Men of the Units for the Reinstatement of Order (MAT)

Other Specialized Police Units within Directorates

- Groups of Bicycle-mounted Police (motorcycle police) (ΔΙ.ΑΣ. – Ομάδες Δίκυκλης Αστυνόμευσης – Omades Dicyclis Astynomeusis)
- Zeta Group (motorcycle police) (ΖΗΤΑ – Omada Zeta)
- Traffic Accidents Control and Prevention Units (Ο.Ε.Π.Τ.Α. – Ομάδες Ελέγχου και Πρόληψης Τροχαίων Ατυχημάτων)
- Mobile Police Units (Κ.Α.Μ. – Κινητές Αστυνομικές Μονάδες – Kinites Astynomikes Monades)
- Crime Prevention and Suppression Units (Ο.Π.Κ.Ε. – Ομάδες Πρόληψης και Καταστολής Εγκλήματος – Omades Prolipsis kai Katastolis Egklimatos) – Equivalent of the LAPD's Metro Division's B and C Platoons which are responsible for crime suppression, providing assistance to major crimes investigators and serving warrants among other duties.
- Action Group (motorcycle police) (Ομάδα Δράση – Omada Drasi, former Force of Control Fast Confrontation – Δ.ΕΛ.Τ.Α. – Δύναμη Ελέγχου Ταχείας Αντιμετώπισης – Dynami Elenchou Tachias Antimetopisis)
- Prevention and Mediation Units (Ο.Π.ΔΙ. – Ομάδες Πρόληψης και Διαμεσολάβησης – Omades Prolipsis kai Diamesolavisis)
- Border Guards (Συνοριοφύλακες – Synoriophylakes)
- Units for the Reinstatement of (Public) Order (Riot Police, or Police Riot Units) (M.A.T. – Μονάδες Αποκατάστασης Τάξης – Monades Apokatastasis Taxis)
- Airport Police (Αστυνομία Κρατικών Αερολιμένων – Astynomia Kratikon Aerolimenon)
- Prisoner Transport Departments (Τμήμα Μεταγωγών – Tmima Metagogon)
- Tourist Police (Τουριστική Αστυνομία – Touristiki Astynomia). With the law 6450/1935, Government Gazette 14/A/13-1-1935, was founded the Tourist Police Directorate (Διεύθυνση Τουριστικής Αστυνομίας) which initially was Directorate of the Greek National Tourism Organization (EOT) having police officers from Hellenic Gendarmerie and the Cities Police. The Tourist Police Directorate of EOT was abolished by the Mandatory Law 297/1968, Government Gazette 38/A/22-2-1968, replacing by two Tourist Police directorates, one of the Hellenic Gendarmerie Headquarters and one of the Cities Police Headquarters respectively. With the law 1481/1984, Government Gazette 152/A/8-10-1984, the Tourist Police was abolished and its services assigned to the local police stations and units making in-house tourist offices in which were abolished thereafter by the Presidential Decree 508/1989, Government Gazette 216/A/3-10-1989. In 1993 Tourist Police re-founded. With the articles 101 and 105 of the Presidential Decree 7/2017, Government Gazette 14/A/9-2-2017, created the Stations and Units of the Tourist Police at the Hellenic Police Directorates at several prefectures.

=== Structure within a Regional Police Directorate ===
There are currently 56 Police Directorates (Αστυνομικές Διευθύνσεις) operating in Greece. They broadly correspond to the territories of the 52 Prefectures of Greece, the country’s former second-level administrative directorates abolished during the 2011 Kallikratis reform, when they were replaced by regional units.

- Note: Most regional units retained the same territorial boundaries as their predecessor prefectures; the principal change introduced by the reform was the subdivision of island prefectures so that each major island constitutes a separate regional unit, increasing their number to 74.

Each Police Directorate is headquartered in the capital of the prefecture/regional unit over which it has jurisdiction, and operates under the supervision of the respective General Regional Police Directorate (Γενική Περιφερειακή Αστυνομική Διεύθυνση) of the Administrative Region to which the regional unit belongs. These Directorates are led by Brigadier Generals or Police Directors and are in charge of the patrol, traffic control as well as the investigation, suppression and prevention of crime in the area, among other police-related tasks.

The Directorate's Staff comprises 4 Bureaus: a Policing Bureau, a Crime Investigation and Prosecution & Foreign Persons Bureau, an Administrative Support, HR & Education Bureau, and a Informatics Systems and Networking Bureau. All 4 Bureaus are given orders and guidelines from the General Directorates of the Hellenic Police HQ, overseen by the Second Deputy Chief (Deputy of Staff), and in turn coordinate the various Subdirectorates, Departments, Offices, Units, Precincts and Stations which fall under the oversight of the Directorate and ensure their compliance with the 5 missions of the Hellenic Police.

The General Regional Police Directorate additionally has an Operations Bureau which oversees and coordinates all operations across the region, has administrative command over all Police Special Forces operating in the region and answers directly to the Directorate of Operations and Crises Management, the Special Police Forces Directorate and the Police Air Force Directorate of the Hellenic Police HQ, overseen by the First Deputy Chief (Deputy of Operations).

==== Policing Bureau ====
The cornerstone of General Policing is preemptive patrolling and responding to emergency dispatch calls. In some of the country's largest cities (Attica, Thessaloniki, Patras, Heraklion, Larissa, Ioannina, Lamia, Chalkida, Chania and Agrinio), this duty befalls to the dedicated Immediate Response (Άμεση Δράση) Departments. Both car patrols and the motorcycle police units ΔΙ.ΑΣ. and ΖΗΤΑ are part of this Department. Immediate Response officers may additionally support other police services and participate in operations whenever required. In the rest of the country, patrolling duties are exclusively carried out by the local Precincts.

Frequently encountered alongside Immediate Response and Precinct patrols are the units of the Traffic Police Department(s). With their own fleet of cars and motorcycles, officers of this Department regulate traffic, especially during exceptional occasions and traffic congestion, enforce traffic laws and serve tickets for traffic violations, and respond to traffic accidents in order to reroute traffic and guard the scene.

Traffic Police Departments also have their own Investigations Offices which handle all traffic-related criminal cases and investigations, as well as Infractions Offices where citizens can appeal their traffic tickets.

Additionally, they command the Traffic Accidents Control and Prevention Units (Ομάδες Ελέγχου και Πρόληψης Τροχαίων Ατυχημάτων - Ο.Ε.Π.Τ.Α.), specialized units which mainly create road blocks in order to conduct field sobriety tests, monitor speeding and check drivers' documentation and general road behavior, preventing law-breaking drivers from causing any potential accidents.

The Traffic Police Directorate of Attica additionally commands the Traffic Monitoring and Control Operations Chamber (Θάλαμος Επιχειρήσεων Παρακολούθησης και Ελέγχου Κυκλοφορίας - Θ.Ε.Π.Ε.Κ.), which is staffed with Ο.Ε.Π.Τ.Α. officers as well, and is tasked with monitoring hundreds of AI-enabled traffic cameras installed on major central avenues of the region, with the help of the, in-house developed, "Traffic Commander" computational system which gathers, processes and analyses data from dozens of different sources in real time. These cameras operate as part of a pilot program aimed at the large-scale, automated detection and verification of traffic violations, improving both efficiency and enforcement capacity.

The system automatically identifies violations, reads vehicle license plates, retrieves the registered owner’s contact details from police databases, and sends an SMS notification containing the traffic fine along with an RF payment code.

By the end of 2026, the installation of approximately 2,000 such cameras is scheduled across streets, avenues, and highways in Attica, Thessaloniki, and Crete, along with an additional 500 cameras inside public buses. The system is expected to be gradually expanded to the rest of the country thereafter.

Another group of Ο.Ε.Π.Τ.Α. officers serving in Θ.Ε.Π.Ε.Κ. make up the Special Intelligence and Social Media Analysis Group (Ειδική Ομάδα Ανάλυσης Πληφοροριών και Κοινωνικών Δικτύων), who scan the internet for audiovisual material exhibiting unlawful traffic conduct (such as speeding, street racing, traffic signal violation, improper overtaking etc), with the goal of identifying and locating the perpetrators.

Since March 24, 2026, the Traffic Monitoring and Control Operations Chamber also guides Κ.Ο.Μ.Β.Ο.Σ. (Κεντρική Ομάδα Μέτρων Βελτίωσης Οδικής Συμμόρφωσης - Central Unit for Road Safety Compliance Improvement Measures), the newly-formed traffic police taskforce, which responds to and decongests the area's most severe traffic jams. Police officials hope that the analysis of real-time data from the AI cameras, as well as from 10 newly-commissioned unmanned aircraft, will significantly aid police officers on the ground in achieving a better hierarchical management of traffic jams, as well as a more rapid response, leading to decreased delays for drivers.

All vehicle patrol units typically consist of a Sergeant or Deputy Sergeant serving as the driver, accompanied by a Constable or Special Guard in the passenger seat. Within each patrol sector, field supervision during a shift is exercised by the most senior patrol officer on duty—usually a Sergeant, Deputy Lieutenant, or Lieutenant II—while overall shift oversight is provided either by a designated shift supervisor (primarily in Immediate Response Departments and some Traffic Police Departments) or by each service’s 24-hour duty officer, both of whom typically hold the rank of Lieutenant or Deputy Lieutenant.

- Note: The duty officer serves as the acting commanding officer of a service outside regular working hours (07:00–15:00). In addition to coordinating all personnel on duty during their 24-hour shift, ensuring the effective execution of assigned tasks and deploying to more serious crime scenes to assume command and coordinate response (which would be the sole duties of a shift supervisor), the duty officer is responsible for a range of administrative and operational duties. These include overseeing the maintenance and readiness of the service’s facilities, equipment, and vehicles; supervising detention facilities (in services that operate holding cells, such as Precincts, Prisoner Transport Departments, Airport Police Departments, and Border Protection Departments); answer all civilian calls directed to the service during their shift; guide and assist civilians who physically come to the service to seek help; coordinating with other services in the event of serious incidents or emergencies; and taking statements from civilians, arrestees or individuals brought in for questioning. All services have duty officers, but only a few also have a shift supervisor.

Each Directorate also oversees a dispatch operational center, which handles calls to 100, Greece's Emergency Police Phone Number. Within the call center, Constables and Deputy Sergeants act as phone operators. They answer civilian calls and compile call sheets containing all relevant information about the caller and the incident. Dispatching duties are carried out by mid-ranking officers—most often Sergeants, Deputy Lieutenants, or Lieutenants—who coordinate both foot and vehicle patrol units, as well as other first responder units if necessary, inside the Directorate's jurisdiction, to ensure the most effective and timely response. A shift supervisor, also selected from these mid-ranking officers, oversees the call center during each shift and is additionally responsible for handling text messages sent to “100.”

The dispatch center’s personnel may issue operational instructions to any field officer, regardless of the respective ranks of those involved. Likewise, the center’s shift supervisor can direct the supervisors of all services responsible for patrol duties, including Precincts, Immediate Response Departments, and Traffic Police Departments. This authority derives from the fact that the dispatch center’s shift supervisor also serves as the Directorate’s duty officer, effectively acting as the commanding officer of the entire Directorate’s forces outside regular working hours.

Some Directorates also supervise:

- an Airport Police Department

which includes its own Policing Office (for conducting patrols, general policing duties and enforcing traffic laws inside the airport), Investigation & Prosecution Office (for handling criminal investigations inside the airport) as well as a Passport Inspection Office;

- Tourist Police Department(s)

which conduct both foot and vehicle patrols in touristic areas and have their own Call and Dispatch Center which serves tourist callers in at least 5 foreign languages; and

- a Prisoner Transport Department

which transfers prisoners between holding cells, courthouses, prisons and hospitals. The Prisoner Transport Department of Attica additionally has its own Special Transport Unit (Ειδική Ομάδα Μεταγωγών - Ε.Ο.Μ.), which conducts the transfers of criminals who have proven to be especially dangerous, violent or suspicious of escaping. To carry out their mission, this unit is equipped with special weaponry and armored trucks.

Note: Despite the formation of a separate Judicial Police Force in 2025, it currently mostly operates in the largest courts of Attica and Thessaloniki, due to understaffing. Until then, the local Prisoner Transport Departments are also responsible for guarding courtrooms and maintaining order inside of them.

All 5 of these types of Departments operate exclusively within the metropolitan borders of the Regional Unit's capital city (apart from the Traffic Police Departments with territorial jurisdiction over the country's Highways). There also operates at least one Precinct in said city which primarily deals with other general policing as well as community policing duties, while simultaneously functioning as a community outreach for civilians to report police-related matters and have a direct contact with law enforcement officers.

Among a Precinct's duties are

- a) detaining individuals arrested for crimes committed within its jurisdiction, interrogating them, and conducting the preliminary investigation before referring the case to the District Attorney’s Office;
- b) receiving citizens’ reports of local crimes and conducting the corresponding investigations;
- c) issuing IDs, residence permits and firearm-carrying permits as well as registering privately-owned firearms;
- d) assigning officers to parole duties;
- e) guarding high-risk targets (e.g. local government officials and hospitalized victims, suspects or arrestees) and public buildings (e.g., embassies, city halls), securing crime scenes and restricted areas, and enforcing public order measures during major events such as festivals, concerts, parades, and sporting events;
- f) conducting vehicle patrols, primarily during evening and night shifts, to support and supplement the operations of Immediate Response Departments by responding mainly to lower-priority incidents such as civil disputes, noise complaints, and disorderly conduct, or—where no such department exists—providing exclusive first-line response to emergency calls on a 24-hour basis;
- g) conducting foot patrols and inspecting shops, street markets, catering establishments and other businesses in order to verify their lawful operation and potentially identify any sales- and health-related violations, usually with the assistance of the Municipal Police
- h) fostering communication, trust and rapport with residents and business owners, reinforcing the local sense of security, and performing additional community-policing duties, such as organizing or participating in informative or awareness-raising events;
- i) handling cases and investigations involving domestic violence, animal abuse and breaches of the peace;
- j) analyzing crime statistics and evaluating the effectiveness of policing tactics within their jurisdiction, as well as proposing reforms and crime-prevention measures;
- k) assisting state services such as the labor inspection corps, social services, the electricity distribution network, waste management, judicial services, the public health service, the sanitation control service, the Independent Authority of Public Revenue, Regional Government authorities etc, whenever they require police intervention; and
- l) assisting other police services in operations and serving the citizens regarding all general police-related matters.

The first three of these duties are delegated to either the Investigations Offices in smaller, typically rural, Precincts or the Crime Investigation and Prosecution Departments or Subdirectorates which operate in larger Precincts (see Crime Investigation and Prosecution & Foreign Persons Bureau).

Traffic Policing, Tourist Policing, Prisoner Transport Duties in smaller towns and villages which are located outside the city limits of the Regional Unit's capital, are also carried out by the officers of the local, rural Precincts and Stations (very small Precincts in small, remote villages and islands), similar to how Sheriffs' Departments handle police matters in the unincorporated areas in the US. This used to be under the jurisdiction of the Hellenic Gendarmerie before its fusion with the Cities Police in 1984.

Due to staff shortages in many rural Precincts however, most General Regional Police Directorates in mainland Greece operate Mobile Police Units - MPUs (Κινητές Αστυνομίες Μονάδες - Κ.Α.Μ.), auxiliary units which patrol a different provincial area of the Region, every day of the week, from 6 PM to 12 AM. At the same time, the Regional Units' Crime Investigation and Prosecution Subdirectorates also assist the rural Precincts' Investigation Offices during larger-scale and more serious investigations.

Conversely, some rural Precincts in bigger and more central towns might even have their own ΔΙ.ΑΣ. (motorcycle police) units, their own specialized Traffic Police Office/Department and/or Ο.Ε.Π.Τ.Α. (Traffic Accidents Control and Prevention Units), their own Tourist Police Office (usually in very touristic towns and islands), as well as their own Crime Investigation and Prosecution Department and/or Ο.Π.Κ.Ε. (Units of the Suppression of Crime - see Crime Investigation and Prosecution Bureau), in order to police their area of jurisdiction more efficiently.

63 Precincts around the country are also currently housing Domestic Violence Offices which civilians can visit in order to seek help from investigators with specialized training on matters of domestic violence as well as to obtain the "Panic Button" app and be able to communicate with the Police immediately and discreetly during a domestic crisis emergency. Investigators of these offices conduct follow-up evaluations on victims even after prosecution has concluded.

Emergency notifications from the panic button app are handled by a dedicated officer serving in each Directorate's dispatch operational center.

As part of an initiative to boost community policing practices even more, starting with the Region of Crete on March 20, 2025, 4 Squads of "Animal Police" (one in each of Crete's Regional Units, Heraklion, Chania, Rethymno and Lasithi) were formed to address animal welfare offenses. Each squad right now has a Captain as its Commanding Officer as well as 4 more members, and if this pilot program works, there are plans to develop Animal Police Squads all across the country. Captain I Emmanouil Boutyrakis, who is also the Commanding Officer of the Sitia Precinct, leads this Pilot Program.

Another pilot program which was initiated in Attica is the "Ariadne" Taskforce also known as Transit Police. Starting in 2021 with subway trains and expanding in 2025 to include policing all means of Public Transportation like Trams, Buses and regular Trains, this taskforce now includes a total of more than 410 officers. The pilot program is led and overseen by Brig. General Emmanouil Panagiotou and the Taskforce is led by Police Deputy Director Konstantinos Dimou and if it's successful, it will become its own separate Directorate in the General Police Directorate of Attica and possibly even expand to the rest of the country. From February 19 2025 to June 30 2026, the officers of the "Ariadne" Taskforce performed almost 284,000 inspections and over 4,400 arrests. These arrests mainly concern individuals who were found in possession of drugs and weapons while on public transportation, as well as perpetrators who caused damage to buses and assaulted drivers. Additionally, there has been a recorded decrease in incidents of narcotics usage and robberies, both in transit and at stations, for the duration of the program thus far.

==== Crime Investigation and Prosecution & Foreign Persons Bureau ====
This Bureau mainly oversees the Crime Investigation and Prosecution Subdirectorate or Department of a Directorate (previously called Security Subdirectorate/Department), which is responsible for the detection, investigation and suppression of crime in the capital city of the respective Regional Unit, and is located within that city’s central Precinct. In Attica and Thessaloniki however, the corresponding Subdirectorates also coordinate the numerous Crime Investigation and Prosecution Departments which are housed across the plethora of Precincts of these two large metropolitan areas.

Each Subdirectorate/Department in question consists of

- a Public Security Department/Office (which conducts the majority of investigations)
- a Foreign Persons Department/Office (which handles administrative matters concerning foreign people, such as background checks, indexing, residence permit issuing, etc)
- an ID Issuing and Records Office and
- a Weapon Permits Issuing and Registry Office,

while some Subdirectorates may additionally include the following dedicated services:

- a Narcotics Department/Office (which additionally collaborates and exchanges intelligence with the Organized Crime Directorate's Subdirectorate of Narcotics)
- a State Protection Department/Office
- a Hate Crimes Department/Office and
- a Juveniles Department/Office (which handle cases involving minors, either as perpetrators or as victims)

In Attica and Thessaloniki, the central Crime Investigation and Prosecution Directorates further include:

- Departments of Searches (which are part of the European Network of Fugitive Active Search Teams (ENFAST) and are responsible for locating fugitives and wanted offenders);
- Departments of Assemblies and Public Events Protection (which investigate rioting and public order disruption during protests and other public congregations), as well as;
- Departments of Environmental Protection.

In addition, due to the large metropolitan areas under their jurisdictions, these Directorates have their own Operational Command Centers, which oversee and coordinate deployed tactical, investigative, and undercover units during major incidents as well as supervise the collection, analysis, and dissemination of actionable intelligence to inform decision-making and operational planning.

In Regional Units which are situated near the borders of the country, this Bureau also oversees Border Protection Departments (Τμήματα Συνοριακής Φύλαξης - Τ.Σ.Φ.) and Passport Inspection Departments (Τμήματα Διαβατηριακού Ελέγχου - Τ.Δ.Ε.), as well as Immigration Management Departments (Τμήματα Διαχείρισης Μετανάστευσης - Τ.Δ.Μ.), composed mostly of Border Guards, special police personnel with a 3-month basic training and a fixed-term contract. The officers of the latter seek, arrest and detain illegal immigrants, in preparation for their deportation, and investigate cases concerning the facilitation of the unlawful entry and residence of migrants in the country, including through the forgery of passports, residence permits, and other official documents, as well cases of immigrant trafficking, in collaboration with the Organized Crime Directorate's Human Trafficking Department. There also operate Foreign Persons Directorates in Attica and Thessaloniki, due to the abundance of illegal immigrants residing and working in said large cities, which oversee their own Immigration Management Departments and Passport Inspection - Currency Exchange Stations, as well as standalone Foreign Persons Departments.

Investigative Services mostly consist of Commissioned Officers (officers with a rank of Lieutenant II or higher) or lower-ranking officers with Investigative Duties, while Non-Investigative Personnel who belong in these Services are usually part of the Units of Suppression and Prevention of Crime (Ο.Π.Κ.Ε.), the tactical support groups which aid investigators in executing operations (e.g.: raids, stakeouts, search warrants, arrest warrants etc), as well as the special motorcycle unit "Action" (Δράση), a patrolling unit in Attica and Thessaloniki which responds exclusively to severe crimes and crises with a much faster response time compared to regular patrol officers. There are also Ο.Π.Κ.Ε. Units which are tasked with patrolling certain districts, and/or during certain hours, known for their high crime rates, in order to provide emergency tactical response in assistance to regular patrolling units during a riskier emergency, to conduct inspections for drugs and illegal firearms, or to surveil repeat offenders and/or suspects of ongoing investigations and prevent them from engaging in more illicit activities. Undercover investigators in civilian clothes may also participate in patrols, either on foot or with unmarked vehicles, in order to conduct similar inspections and surveillance operations. Patrolling Ο.Π.Κ.Ε. Units utilize specialized pickup trucks and large SUVs and have much heavier equipment, including automatic weapons, ballistic helmets and shields. Each unit consists of 3-4 officers per vehicle, at least one of which must have the rank of Sergeant or Deputy Lieutenant and acts as squad leader, while all the patrolling squads in a sector have a common senior field supervisor during each shift, usually with the rank of Lieutenant or Deputy Lieutenant. In Police Directorates without Prisoner Transport - Courtroom Police Departments, Ο.Π.Κ.Ε. covers these duties as well. They might additionally provide support in VIP protection and order measures enforcement. The functional profile of Ο.Π.Κ.Ε. bears notable similarity to the B and C Platoons of the LAPD Metropolitan Division in terms of duties, equipment and tactical procedures, although there is no evidence indicating that Ο.Π.Κ.Ε. was directly modeled after said U.S. units.

Ever since November 8, 2025, an additional operational unit has been established within several Precincts of Attica, Thessaloniki and sixteen more Regional Units, designated as Prevention and Mediation Units (Ομάδες Πρόληψης και Διαμεσολάβησης – Ο.Π.ΔΙ.). Composed of 473 highly-trained Police Officers, most of which used to serve in Ο.Π.Κ.Ε., as well as 50 newly-hired accredited Romani Mediators, these Units conduct foot and vehicle patrols on a 24-hour basis within Romani settlements across the country and conduct inspections and crime suppression operations. Their stated mission is the prevention of criminal activity, the strengthening of police presence within these areas, and the promotion of mediation and cooperation between Romani communities and the Hellenic Police. The Ο.Π.ΔΙ. Units fall under the Directorate of Organized Crime's Special Operational Units Department and, outside of Attica and Thessaloniki, they are supervised by the Crime Investigation and Prosecution Subdirectorate of each Regional Unit.

All local Crime Investigation and Prosecution Subdirectorates and Departments operating throughout Greece are required to report their operational activity, findings, and intelligence to the Organized Crime Directorate and its two regional Subdirectorates. This framework is intended to support the centralized analysis and profiling of criminal activity, facilitate intelligence coordination, and enable the identification of broader criminal networks operating across multiple regions of the country. A liaison officer in each Police Directorate links said Directorate to the relevant Organized Crime Service and all three of said Services retain authority to assume primary responsibility for investigations relating to Organized Crime in their geographic area of jurisdiction following prior communication with the Director of the local Crime Investigation and Prosecution Subdirectorate.

In addition to the Departments of Narcotics, Financial Crime and Human & Illegal Items Trafficking common to all three Organized Crime Services, the Subdirectorate of Organized Crime of Crete includes a distinct “Department of Special Criminal Activity”, which is tasked with the investigation of vendetta-related homicides, large-scale illegal weapons possession and trafficking as well as rustling (livestock theft) and other types of organized larceny, phenomena that have been of particular prevalence in rural and mountainous parts of the region for many decades. This Department is equivalent to the Subdirectorate of Property Crimes and Crimes Against Life and is staffed by experienced officers from Attica, 20 of whom form a dedicated Special Operational Unit assigned to immediate deployment in case of such incidents.

To further enhance operational readiness on the island, ever since 2001, six Departments of Police Operations (Τμήματα Αστυνομικών Επιχειρήσεων - Τ.Α.Ε.) have operated across Crete, each with defined geographic jurisdiction in predominantly rural and provincial areas. These Departments function as the rural equivalent of Ο.Π.Κ.Ε. units, providing enhanced patrols, emergency tactical response, inspections related to narcotics and illegal firearms, targeted surveillance, and the execution of raids and arrest warrants. Administratively, they fall under the four Police Directorates of Crete (two in Heraklion, two in Rethymno, one in Chania and one in Lasithi). Operationally, however, they serve as the principal tactical support units of the Subdirectorate of Organized Crime of Crete, fulfilling a role analogous to that of the Special Operational Units of the Organized Crime Services in Attica and Thessaloniki. From 2026 onwards, officers of the Τ.Α.Ε. undergo the same annual rigorous training as Ε.Κ.Α.Μ. (see Operations Bureau).

==== Operations Bureau ====
When an operation or arrest requires highly specialized capabilities – such as confronting heavily armed perpetrators, managing hostage situations, handling suspected explosive devices or weapons of mass destruction, responding to terrorist threats and aircraft or train hijackings, and generally countering overwhelming opposition – members of the Special Police Forces may be deployed alongside or instead of Ο.Π.Κ.Ε. These include: a) the Special Suppressive Antiterrorist Unit (Ε.Κ.Α.Μ. – SSAU), which serves as the national SWAT-equivalent force; b) the Department of Explosive Devices Disposal; c) the Department of K9 Operators; and d) the Police Air Force Directorate.

These units are also mobilized during emergencies and crises that exceed the capacity and capabilities of regular police personnel – such as large-scale manhunts for dangerous fugitives or searches for missing persons. The first three units operate under the Directorate of Special Police Forces, while the Police Air Force Directorate became a standalone directorate in 2016. Both are central services under the authority of the First Deputy Chief (Deputy Chief of Operations) and operate primarily out of Attica and Thessaloniki, alongside the Special Investigative Directorates.

There is however an additional Special Suppressive Anti-Terrorist Unit in Crete, while Bomb Squad Units and K9 Units, have been established within most Police Directorates across the country and are staffed by officers dispatched from the central Directorate of Special Police Forces in Attica. These units operate under the supervision of the Operations Bureau of each region’s General Regional Police Directorate. Regarding police dogs, each K9 handler and dog pair trained in explosive detection (95 pairs nationwide) is assigned to the Bomb Squad Units, while those trained in narcotics detection (51 pairs) serve within the Narcotics Departments of the Crime Investigation and Prosecution Subdirectorates. In Attica, Thessaloniki, and certain border regions, K9 handler–dog pairs are also deployed for patrol, prisoner transport, and guard duties (42 pairs in total).

Some regional Operations Bureaus also oversee an Office of Unmanned Aircraft, composed of drone operators from the Police Air Force Directorate’s Subdirectorate of Unmanned Aircraft. These operators are stationed in selected regional units –particularly on islands and near Greece’s borders. Consequently, while manned aircraft (helicopters) operate only in Attica and Thessaloniki, unmanned aircraft are also active in Heraklion, Evros (in Alexandroupolis and Orestiada), Samos, Chios, and the Dodecanese.

Another major tactical formation of the Hellenic Police is the Riot Police Units (ΜΑΤ – Μονάδες Αποκατάστασης Τάξης), operating in Attica and Thessaloniki under each city’s Directorate of Police Operations (Δ.Α.Ε. – Διεύθυνση Αστυνομικών Επιχειρήσεων). Each Directorate comprises two Subdirectorates: the Subdirectorate of Public Order Reinstatement (Υποδιεύθυνση Αποκατάστασης Τάξης – Υ.Α.Τ.) and the Subdirectorate of Order Measures Enforcement (Υποδιεύθυνση Μέτρων Τάξης – Υ.ΜΕ.Τ.). Before the formation of the central Special Police Forces and Police Air Force Directorates, the K9, Bomb Squad, Ε.Κ.Α.Μ. and Helicopter units were also part of the two Directorates of Police Operations with strictly local jurisdictions in Attica and Thessaloniki.

Officers of the Subdirectorate of Order Measures Enforcement wear standard police uniforms and equipment and are typically deployed at smaller demonstrations, sporting events, or public gatherings where extreme violence is not anticipated. They might also be supported by officers of the local Precincts and Ο.Π.Κ.Ε. By contrast, officers of the Subdirectorate of Public Order Reinstatement wear olive-green uniforms and heavier protective gear, including riot shields, helmets, tear gas, flash-bang grenades, and oxygen masks. For operational security reasons, they do not display name tags or badge numbers on their uniforms. Platoons of this subdirectorate are usually deployed at large-scale demonstrations, high-risk sporting events, and gatherings organized by anarchist or other extremist groups where riots or violent incidents are likely to occur. Officers of the Υ.Α.Τ. have been the subject of public controversy concerning allegations of excessive or unwarranted police violence.

Specifically under the Directorate of Police Operations of Attica, there also operates the Assemblies Management and Restriction Unit (Ομάδα Διαχείρισης και Οριοθέτησης Συναθροίσεων - Ο.Δ.Ο.Σ.), made up of 46 unarmed officers, which was initially established during the COVID-19 lockdowns in 2020, to manage and enforce social distancing during rallies, demonstrations or other type of large congregations. In the post-pandemic world, they are deployed to manage large assemblies where no violence is expected, like conventions and festivals or large religious ceremonies, including public funerals and memorial services. Their duty is exclusively crowd control and not order enforcement, which is why they do not even carry batons or wear any kind of protective gear.

Riot policing and public order reinstatement duties outside of Attica and Thessaloniki are carried out by Support Platoons (Διμοιρίες Υποστήριξης). Each Regional Police Directorate maintains one such platoon, while Patras has two due to its larger population and greater operational needs.

Riot policing platoons (ΥΑΤ/ΥΜΕΤ/Support) nationwide additionally perform foot patrols in crowded public areas and during peak hours, enabling immediate intervention in cases of public order disturbances.

Each Platoon typically consists of 30 Constables or Deputy Sergeants, 2 Sergeants or Deputy Lieutenants serving as Squad Leaders, and 2 Lieutenants serving as the Platoon Commander and Deputy Commander, respectively, although many Platoons tend to be understaffed. Unlike Patras and Heraklion, where the Support Platoons are standalone services with permanently established personnel, operating under the local Directorates' Policing Offices, the personnel of most Support Platoons are drawn from various other police services within the Directorate and the platoons are only activated when the enforcement of order measures has been deemed unsuccessful and the restoration of public order cannot be achieved by the Directorate’s regular police forces. In exceptional circumstances, the Riot Police Units of Attica may be deployed anywhere in southern Greece, while those of Thessaloniki may operate anywhere in northern Greece, if deemed necessary by the Chief of Police.

Similarly, the Special Suppressive Anti-Terrorist Units (SSAU/Ε.Κ.Α.Μ.) of Attica and Thessaloniki may be deployed nationwide for specialized operations, as only those two cities, as well as the Region of Crete, maintain dedicated units with such responsibilities.

Ε.Κ.Α.Μ. units are not homogeneous. They comprise several squads and platoons, with a similar composition to riot policing units, and officers trained in specific specialties, such as:

- Raiders
- Breachers
- Snipers
- Parachutists
- Frogmen
- Rope Climbers-Rappelers
- Medics

All officers who wish to join Ε.Κ.Α.Μ. must have already served in the Hellenic Police for at least 5 years and then need to successfully undergo a rigorous 3-month training, before being considered for a placement in the Unit. Provided they are chosen, they undergo an additional 3-month training every year for the duration of their service in the Unit. Ε.Κ.Α.Μ. routinely collaborates with similar special Police forces across Europe (SO19, GEO, RAID, GIGN, SEC, EKO Cobra) and the United States (FBI Hostage Rescue Team, US Marshals Special Operation Group), both in operations as well as in training exercises.

Most of the officers serving in the Organized Crime Directorate's Special Operational Units, which offer tactical support to the Investigators of the Service, used to serve in Ε.Κ.Α.Μ. and continue undergoing the same rigorous training and follow similar special tactics.

==== Other ====
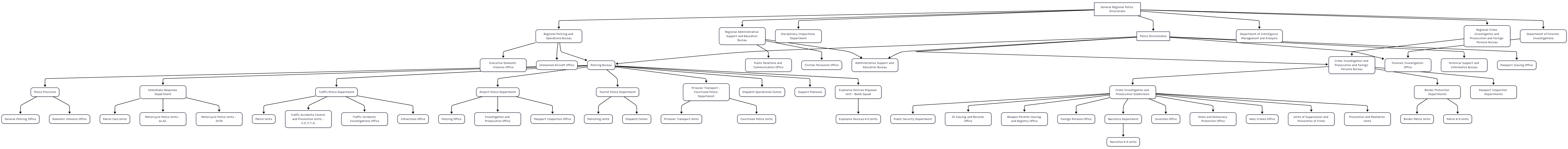
Hierarchical Structure of the Services and Units under the jurisdiction of a General Regional Police Directorate of the Hellenic Police

Each Directorate additionally has an Infirmary with doctors, nurses and a psychologist, a Passport Issuing Office, as well as an Office of Forensic Investigations, equipped with a Crime Scene Investigation Unit ("Σήμανση") which collects and processes crime scene evidence, such as biological and biochemical samples, digital data, ballistics evidence, etc; these pieces of evidence however are analyzed by the Regional Departments of Forensic Investigations which comprise the necessary laboratories and specialized personnel with the ability to do so. General Regional Police Directorates also command a Department of Intelligence Gathering and Management, a Disciplinary Inspection Department and an Office of Press Communication and PR. All of these services report directly to their respective Directorates at HQ (ie the Directorates of Health and Safety, Passports and Other Security Documents, Forensic Investigations, Intelligence Gathering and Management, Disciplinary Inspections and Communications).

The Counter-Terrorism Directorate and the Cyber Crime Directorate are the only Special Investigative Directorates to exclusively operate in Attica and Thessaloniki, but they both have national jurisdiction. Additionally, even though the Government Officials and other Susceptible Targets Protection General Directorate operates in Attica from an administrative standpoint, the personnel of this directorate have a duty to follow the person of interest they are protecting wherever they may travel to around the country as well as abroad.

Finally, the only staff Directorates with no regional offices of any kind, are the Organization and Legal Support Directorate, the Strategic Planning Directorate and the International Police Cooperation Directorate.

=== Policing in Mount Athos ===
Mount Athos is a self-governed monastic peninsula located in Chalkidiki, enjoying a special autonomous status within Greece and lying outside the ordinary regional administrative structure. Consequently, the Police Directorate of Mount Athos is placed directly under the authority of the Chief of Police. It oversees a Precinct, a Crime Investigation and Prosecution Department as well as nine Police Stations located at the principal monasteries of Mount Athos, which are responsible for general policing within their respective jurisdictions.

In accordance with the longstanding prohibition on the presence of women within Mount Athos (the avaton), personnel assigned to the Mount Athos Police Directorate are exclusively male.

== Ranks, Duties and Salaries ==
=== Ranks of the Hellenic Police Force ===
Ranks and insignia of the Hellenic Police Force
Title	Police Lieutenant General	Police Major General	Police Brigadier General	Police Director (or Police Colonel*)	Police Deputy Director (or Police Lieutenant Colonel*)	Police Captain I (or Police Major*)	Police Captain II	Police Lieutenant I	Police Lieutenant II	Police Deputy Lieutenant (or Police Warrant Officer*)	Police Sergeant (Investigative Duty – with promotion exam)	Police Sergeant (Investigative Duty)	Police Sergeant (non-Investigative Duty)	Police Deputy Sergeant (Investigative Duty)	Police Deputy Sergeant (non-Investigative Duty)	Constable
Greek title	Αντιστράτηγος	Υποστράτηγος	Ταξίαρχος	Αστυνομικός Διευθυντής	Αστυνομικός Υποδιευθυντής	Αστυνόμος Α΄	Αστυνόμος Β΄	Υπαστυνόμος Α΄	Υπαστυνόμος B΄	Ανθυπαστυνόμος	Αρχιφύλακας (Ανακριτικός Υπάλληλος – Με εξετάσεις)	Αρχιφύλακας (Ανακριτικός Υπάλληλος)	Αρχιφύλακας (Μη ανακριτικός υπάλληλος)	Υπαρχιφύλακας (Ανακριτικός Υπάλληλος)	Υπαρχιφύλακας (Μη ανακριτικός υπάλληλος)	Αστυφύλακας
Insignia																

Hellenic Police ranks and insignia, 1985-1986
Title	Police Lieutenant General	Police Major General	Police Director (or Police Colonel*)	Police Deputy Director (or Police Lieutenant Colonel*)	Police Captain I (or Police Major*)	Police Captain II	Police Lieutenant	Police Deputy Lieutenant (or Police Warrant Officer*)	Police Sergeant	Constable
Greek title	Αντιστράτηγος	Υποστράτηγος	Αστυνομικός Διευθυντής	Αστυνομικός Υποδιευθυντής	Αστυνόμος Α΄	Αστυνόμος Β΄	Υπαστυνόμος	Ανθυπαστυνόμος	Αρχιφύλακας	Αστυφύλακας
Insignia										

*The Greek rank titles are translated directly into English. The rank titles given in parentheses (e.g. “Police Major” and “Police Colonel”) are the official English equivalents used by the Hellenic Police in its international communications.

=== Duties ===
==== Constables and Non-Commissioned Officers ====
Police Constables must be assigned to some kind of field duty like patrol, traffic control, prisoner transport, order enforcement and reinstatement or guarding duties for at least 4 years following their graduation from the Police Academy. For the first 2 years, they can only be appointed to Precincts, Stations, Immediate Response, Traffic Police, Airport Police, Prisoner Transport and Tourist Police Departments, the Directorate of Police Operations of Attica or Thessaloniki or in Crime Investigation services and the Organized Crime Directorate as prisoner guards.. For the next 2 years after that, they can apply for reassignment and are able to also be transferred to services performing border control and immigration enforcement. However, they may only join special police units—namely Ε.Κ.Α.Μ./S.S.A.U., K-9 units, Bomb Squad units, Ο.Π.Κ.Ε., Τ.Α.Ε. and the Organized Crime Directorate's Special Operational Units (including Ο.Π.ΔΙ.)—after completing at least five years of service. Officers of any rank who have joined the Organized Crime Directorate, the Counter-Terrorism Directorate, the Forensic Investigation Directorate, Ε.Κ.Α.Μ./S.S.A.U. and the Police Air Force Directorate, including any of their local subdirectorates, departments and offices, cannot be transferred out of those services before completing 10 continuous years within them.

Constables may be promoted to Deputy Sergeants after at least ten years of service and generally retain similar duties, albeit with increased responsibility. Deputy Sergeants may then be promoted to Sergeants (three chevrons) after completing 15 years of total service. Alternatively, Constables, Deputy Sergeants, and three-chevron Sergeants may be promoted directly to four-chevron Sergeant through annual examinations, provided they have completed at least three years of total service, or at least two years if they hold a Bachelor's Degree.

Sergeants typically serve as field supervisors on patrol, squad leaders of tactical units, dispatchers, duty officers, assistant/acting shift supervisors, or in other supervisory roles within precincts, departments, and regional directorates (such as inventory, archive or logistics managers). They function as mid-level supervisors with a number of constables under their command and may also serve as field trainers at the Police Academy.

Four-chevron Sergeants may be promoted to Deputy Lieutenants after completing at least five years of service in their rank, or three years if they hold a Bachelor’s degree that was not previously considered during promotion to Sergeant. Three-chevron Sergeants may only be promoted to Deputy Lieutenants after completing 25 years of total active service in the force. Officers of this rank generally perform duties similar to those of Sergeants but may additionally serve as shift supervisors, senior field supervisors of special units (such as Guard Units, Bomb Squad Units, K-9 Units, Ο.Π.Κ.Ε., Ο.Π.ΔΙ. and Ο.Ε.Π.Τ.Α.), taskforce field leaders, tactical operations coordinators or platoon commanders, duties which are usually assigned to Lieutenants.

Both Sergeants and Deputy Lieutenants can be assigned to positions which would normally be reserved for Constables, in case of an abundance of the former and scarcity of the latter in a given service.

Deputy Lieutenants may be promoted to Lieutenant II after completing at least three years in rank and successfully graduating from a one-year program at the Police Academy’s Further Education and Training School. Thereafter, officers may advance through the ranks up to Police Deputy Director and retire with the rank of Police Director (ret).

==== Commissioned Officers ====
Graduates of the Police Academy’s School of Police Commissioned Officers on the other hand begin their careers at the rank of Lieutenant II and may advance to the rank of Lieutenant General, the highest rank in the Hellenic Police. Lower-ranking officers may also apply for entry examinations to the school and, upon successful graduation, are promoted to Lieutenant II.

Contrary to lower-ranking personnel who are usually assigned to field work, Commissioned Officers mostly perform administrative, command, investigative or other, mostly office-bound, duties. It is possible however for Lieutenants to continue on field duties in supervisory roles, especially in understaffed services.

Newly-graduated Lieutenants II are usually assigned to precincts and other types of Departments as duty officers, shift supervisors, staff officers, inter-service liaisons or deputy commanding officers, providing early experience in supervisory positions, but can also be assigned to specialized services in a variety of roles, including investigators, dispatchers, press spokespeople, passport and ID issuing officers etc. For the first 2 years following their graduation, they must not be appointed to any Staff services or any of the central services of the Hellenic Police HQ, apart from the Organized Crime Directorate. As with lower-ranking personnel, commissioned officers may only be assigned to special tactical units after completing at least five years of service, at which point they may serve directly as platoon commanders or senior field supervisors.

Scientists (including biologists, chemists, physicists, computer scientists, engineers, psychologists, and anthropologists), as well as medical doctors and dentists, may also join the Hellenic Police, as "special duty officers", without completing the full undergraduate program of the Police Academy. These officers enter the force at the rank of Lieutenant II (scientists) or Lieutenant I (medical doctors and dentists) and undergo a three-month basic training program covering firearms use, legal fundamentals, and police procedures. They are typically assigned to the Forensic Investigation Directorate or the Health and Safety Directorate in the case of doctors, dentists and therapists, and may advance to the rank of Major General, serving as Directors of the aforementioned directorates.

Lieutenants II are eligible to be promoted to Lieutenant I after at least 4 years of service in that rank, while Lieutenants I can advance to Captain II after having spent at least 5 years in their rank. After that, Captains II need at least 6 years in their rank to advance to Captain I, while the same goes for the promotion between Captain I to Police Deputy Director and between Police Deputy Director to Police Director. This threshold can be reduced to 5 years, provided the officer has been in active service for 14, 20 or 25 years respectively as a Commissioned Officer.

Officers with the ranks of Lieutenant, Captain and Deputy Director (a rank equivalent to Lieutenant Colonel in the armed forces and Superintendent in British policing) can serve as Commanding Officers of precincts, departments, offices, bureaus, or certain units, with Captain I being the most common commanding rank. Deputy Directors are most frequently assigned to command investigative services, as the majority of their personnel already hold the ranks of Lieutenant and Captain, or larger services comprising multiple subordinate offices and units, themselves being headed by Lieutenants and Captains.

Sergeants, Deputy Lieutenants and Lieutenants, on the other hand, are typically appointed as commanders of Police Stations (Αστυνομικοί Σταθμοί), which function as very small precincts in remote villages and islands.

The duties of Commanding Officers include coordination, strategic planning, mentoring and guidance, budget and resource allocation, personnel evaluation and disciplinary oversight, representation of the service before higher command and local government authorities, crisis management as well as direct oversight of major incidents and investigations.

Captains I, Police Deputy Directors and Police Directors (rank equivalent to Colonel and Chief Superintendent) may serve as Subdirectorate directors, while Directorates are typically commanded by Police Directors and Brigadier Generals. General Directorates (including General Regional Police Directorates), and the Special Investigative Directorates of the Hellenic Police Headquarters are led by Brigadier Generals or Major Generals.

To be promoted to Brigadier General from Police Director, one must have served at least 3 years in the latter rank, or 2 in case they have 28 years of service as Commissioned Officers, and Brigadier Generals can advance to Major Generals after 2 years in rank or just 1 if they've served 30 total years as Commissioned Officers. Major Generals can finally be promoted to Lieutenant Generals after at least 1 year in their rank.

There are only five Lieutenant Generals in the Hellenic Police: the Chief of the Hellenic Police, the two Deputy Chiefs, and the General Police Coordinators of Northern Greece and Southern Greece. The Hellenic Police does not employ four- or five-star general ranks.

==== Investigative Officers ====
Since the Hellenic Police was established with organizational assistance from the British Police, its operational structure does not include a distinct “Detective” rank. Instead, police officers of all ranks who have entered the force through the Hellenic Police Academy (as opposed to Special Guards or Border Guards) may be assigned to investigative services, such as Investigation Offices, Crime Investigation and Prosecution Departments and Subdirectorates, and Special Investigative Directorates.

Within these services, police personnel perform the role of Investigative Officers (Ανακριτικοί Υπάλληλοι). Deputy Lieutenants, Lieutenants and Captains (who usually act as Investigator Squad Leaders) most commonly serve as primary investigators and case handlers, in a role broadly comparable to Inspectors and Chief Inspectors in British policing. Lower-ranking personnel, such as Constables, Deputy Sergeants, and Sergeants assigned to investigative duties, typically act as assistant investigators, or may be entrusted with smaller-scale cases, including misdemeanors, petty offenses, and minor criminal cases, particularly in smaller departments.

An Investigative Officer (Ανακριτικός Υπάλληλος) is responsible for conducting preliminary criminal investigations under the supervision of the Public Prosecutor. Their duties include the collection, analysis and evaluation of evidence, interviewing witnesses and suspects, conducting crime scene examinations and inspections, coordinating with forensic and technical services, and drafting official reports and case files (δικογραφίες). Investigative Officers are also responsible for executing prosecutorial orders (such as search and arrest warrants, court-authorized surveillance or undercover operations, and coordinated enforcement actions, the latter often carried out with the assistance of specialized tactical units such as Ο.Π.Κ.Ε., Τ.Α.Ε. and Ε.Κ.Α.Μ.), ensuring procedural legality during the pre-trial phase, and submitting completed case files to the competent judicial authorities. In practice, the designated case handler bears primary responsibility for the progress, completeness, and procedural correctness of the investigation.

Investigative Officers are the only general duty officers (ie not scientists, doctors, engineers, lawyers etc who are considered special duty officers) who are permitted to work in civilian clothes at all times.

=== Border Guards and Special Guards ===
Border Guards and Special Guards are categories of special police personnel within the Hellenic Police who are recruited through a separate process from regular officers. Unlike police officers who enter the Police Academy via the Panhellenic Examinations (the national university entrance system), candidates for these roles apply directly when the Hellenic Police announces relevant vacancies, if they haven't exceeded 28 years of age. Successful applicants attend the Training Center for Special Guards and Border Guards in Tripoli, where they undergo approximately three months of training in basic firearms use, legal principles, and police procedures.

Upon completion of their training, Border Guards are assigned to Border Protection Departments, Passport Inspection Services, and Immigration Management Departments. Their duties are focused exclusively on matters related to foreign nationals and border security. They are typically employed on fixed-term contracts, which may be renewed.

Special Guards, by contrast, are primarily tasked with relieving regular police officers from a wide range of guarding duties. These include the protection of police facilities, detention areas, hospital wards, high-risk targets and buildings, crime scenes, and restricted areas. As a result, they are commonly assigned to Police Precincts, Prisoner Transport Departments, or the Government Officials and other Susceptible Targets Protection General Directorate. In practice, due to staffing shortages and a limited number of recruits entering the Hellenic Police through its higher education institutions, Special Guards are also frequently assigned to patrolling duties, either in Precincts or Immediate Response Departments.

Special Guards and Border Guards do not possess full arrest powers. They may detain individuals temporarily until a regular police officer arrives to carry out a formal arrest. For this reason, patrol units cannot be composed solely of special guards, and guard details always have a special field supervisor on scene.

After a minimum of eight years of service, Special Guards and Border Guards may be eligible for promotion to the rank of police officer. Those who follow this pathway can progress through the hierarchical ranks up to Lieutenant I and may retire at the rank of Captain II (ret.). However, officers originating from these categories are not allowed to undertake investigative duties and are thus not eligible to serve as investigative officers.

=== Salaries ===
While salaries for Police Officers used to be calculated mainly based on their rank, ever since October 1, 2025, their active years on the force became the main factor for their starting salary, with extra benefits for officers holding a position of high responsibility and/or high risk & of special work conditions. Rank still plays a role however, since the Base Salaries are multiplied by a factor ranging from 1,00 to 1,80 depending on the Officer's rank.

Below are the Gross Base Salaries for Police Officers, as they increase by the Active Years on the Force, and broken into 4 Categories based on how the Officer entered the Force:

Active Years on the Force	Category A	Category B	Category C	Category D
1-3	€1320	€1145	€1100	€1100
3-5	€1410	€1185	€1160	€1160
5-7	€1500	€1238	€1201	€1195
7-9	€1560	€1284	€1243	€1231
9-11	€1622	€1352	€1287	€1268
11-13	€1687	€1413	€1332	€1306
13-15	€1754	€1477	€1380	€1345
15-17	€1824	€1543	€1449	€1385
17-19	€1897	€1612	€1521	€1427
19-21	€1992	€1697	€1600	€1469
21-23	€2092	€1765	€1656	€1514
23-25	€2207	€1836	€1714	€1559
25-27	€2328	€1909	€1774	€1606
27-29	€2456	€1985	€1836	€1654
29-31	€2600	€2064	€1900	€1703
31-33	€2740	€2147	€1967	€1755
33-35	€2822	€2211	€2036	€1807
35-37	€2878	€2255	€2107	€1861
37-39	€2936	€2300	€2149	€1917
39+	€3000	€2346	€2192	€1975

- Category A: Joined through the School of Police Commissioned Officers (Lieutenant II - Chief of Police)
- Category B: Joined through the School of Police Constables (Constable - Police Deputy Directors)
- Category C: Initially joined as Special Guards or Border Guards, but have now been promoted to Sworn Officers (Constable - Lieutenant I)
- Category D: Special Guards and Border Guards

Below are the Maximum Extra Benefits that Officers in Positions of High Responsibility and/or High Risk & Of Special Work Conditions can receive. A Position of High Responsibility is defined as being in Command of a Police Service (Unit, Office, Department, Precinct, Subdirectorate, Directorate, Directorate) or holding the Rank of Lt. General and is reserved for Officers with rank of Captain I or above. A Position of High Risk & Of Special Work Conditions has a looser definition, allowing Officers of all Ranks to get it as long as they don't hold an exclusively Administrative Position, excluding of course Police Generals and Commanding Officers, whose jobs are, by definition, administrative. In other words, a Captain I who is the Commanding Officer of a Precinct will get both benefits, while an officer of the same, or even higher rank, who has an administrative position in the Chief's Office for example, will get neither.

Rank	Benefit of High Risk & Of Special Work Conditions + Benefit of High Responsibility
Special Guard/Border Guard	€205
Police Constable	€155
Police Deputy Sergeant	€180
Police Sergeant	€190
Police Deputy Lieutenant	€200
Police Lieutenant II	€220
Police Lieutenant I	€230
Police Captain II	€260
Police Captain I	€325 + €100
Police Deputy Director	€415 + €150
Police Director	€425 + €200
Police Brigadier General	€435 + €300
Police Major General	€440 + €350
Police Lieutenant General	€460 + €400
Deputy Chiefs of the Hellenic Police	€470 + €500
Chief of the Hellenic Police	€490 + €600

On top of that, every officer receives an extra €70 per month for each of their underage children as well as €3.33 extra per hour during night shifts and €46 for every day they are called to work past their 5-day week.

So for example, a Patrol Sergeant who graduated from the School of Police Constables, has 10 years on the job, has 2 kids and works 2 Night Shifts per week, will receive a Gross Salary of approximately €2000 (equating to a Net Salary of ~€1500 after income tax and social security payment are deduced), while a Police Captain I who Graduated from the School of Police Commissioned Officers, has 15 years on the job, has 1 kid, and is the Commanding Officer of a Precinct will get a Gross Salary of approximately €2370. (equating to a Net Salary of ~€1860)

== Internal Inspection and Disciplinary Mechanism ==
The Internal Affairs Directorate (Δ.Ε.Υ. – Διεύθυνση Εσωτερικών Υποθέσεων – Dieufthinsi Esoterikon Hypotheseon) used to be a Special Investigation Service under the Chief of Police with nationwide jurisdiction. However, in 2020, with law 4662/2020, it transitioned into an isolated and independent Service, which exists and acts outside of Police hierarchy and is completely and exclusively overseen by the Minister of Citizen Protection to avoid corruption. It still employees Police personnel rather than third-party investigators however and is currently headed by Police Brig. General Ioannis Dimitrakopoulos.

It has also been renamed to Internal Affairs Service of Security Forces (Υ.Ε.Υ.Σ.Α. – Υπηρεσία Εσωτερικών Υποθέσεων Σωμάτων Ασφαλείας – Ypiresia Esoterikon Ypotheseon Somaton Asfalias) and has jurisdiction over all 3 Security Forces of the Hellenic Republic (Hellenic Police, Hellenic Fire Service and Hellenic Coast Guard).

Citizens can file a report to the Service, anonymously or not, in order to report criminal offences committed by Police, Fire Service and Coast Guard personnel (e.g. domestic violence, narcotics trafficking, domestic abuse, rape etc).

However, investigationns regarding disciplinary offences, including abuse of power, use of police brutality and breach of duty are handled by the Directorate of Ethics and Internal Inspections (Δ.Δ.Ε.Ε. - Διεύθυνση Δεοντολογίας και Εσωτερικών Ελέγχων), a service which is supervised directly by the Chief of Police and is currently being headed by Brig. Gen. Anastasia Lazari. This Directorate comprises the following Departments:

- Ethics Department

It conducts background checks before admitting citizens to the Police Academy, as well as at regular intervals throughout their police career. It is also responsible with maintaining and updating the Hellenic Police's Code of Conduct and training officers about how to follow it and not fall into pitfalls of corruption they may come across during their career.

- Disciplinary Inspections Departments

14 Disciplinary Inspections Departments are currently operating in all General Regional Police Directorates of the country and are tasked with conducting Sworn Administrative Inquiries (Ένορκες Διοικητικές Εξετάσεις - Ε.Δ.Ε.) towards officers who have been accused of, or reported for, disciplinary offences.

as well as 2 support Departments (Disciplinary Inspections Control Department and Disciplinary Councils Administrative Support Department).

Additionally, there exist 2 more Internal Inspection Services: The Office of Personal Data Protection (Γραφείο Προστασίας Δεδομένων Προσωπικού Χαρακτήρα), which is overseen by the Chief of Police and inspects the Hellenic Police's compliance with the EU General Data Protection Regulation (GDPR 2016/679) and the Financial Inspection Directorate (Δ.Ο.Ε. - Διεύθυνση Οικονομικής Επιθεώρησης), which is overseen by the Second Deputy Chief (Deputy of Staff) and ensures the legal budget and gear allocation management of all central and regional services of the Hellenic Police and the Ministry of Citizen Protection.

== Police Academy ==
Hellenic Police Academy
- Αστυνομική Ακαδημία
- Active: 1994–present
- Country: Greece
- Agency: Hellenic Police
- Type: Police academy
- Part of: Ministry of Citizen Protection
- Headquarters: Thrakomakedonon 101, Acharnes, Athens; 38.12071524903326°N 23.744995501007537°E

Structure
- Schools: School for Police Commissioned Officers; School for Police Constables; Further Education and Training School; National Security School

Commanders
- Current commander: Brigadier General Georgios Zacharis: School of Police Commissioned Officers: Police Director Lazaros Giannakis; School of Police Constables: Police Director Ioanna Ntikoudi; Further Education and Training School: Police Director Anastasia Mylona; National Security School: Police Deputy Director Euaggelia Ralli

Website
- www.astynomia.gr

The Hellenic Police Academy in its current form was established in 1994 with the voting of law 2226/1994 through Parliament. It is situated in Athens and is directly under the jurisdiction of the Minister of Citizen Protection. However the Chief of Police, as well as the Director of the Academy — currently Brig. Gen. Georgios Zacharis — can make recommendations and act as advisors to the Minister regarding improvements and other issues (for example structural reform) pertaining to the academy. The Minister and the Chief make annual speeches at the academy to prospective Police Officers. The school is made up of university professors, special scientists (for areas such as forensics) and high-ranking police officers who have specialist field experience. Entrance to the academy is based on Panhellenic Examinations (which are university level entrance examinations), passing specific athletic requirements and an interview, though it differs depending on which particular school of the academy the student wishes to join. The budget for FY 2025 was 2.250.000€.

The Police Academy includes:

- The School for Police Commissioned Officers, for high school graduates who wish to become commissioned Police officers (Police Lieutenants II), which lasts four years. Graduates of this school can reach up to the rank of Lieutenant General, the highest rank in the Hellenic Police.
- The School for Police Constables, for high school graduates who wish to become Police Constables (with investigative duties) and lasts 3 years. Graduates of this school can normally only reach the rank of Police Deputy Director if they have successfully completed the School for Post-Graduate Education and Lifelong Learning as Deputy Lieutenants. There are 6 schools of Police Constables located in 6 distinct Greek cities as well as 1 Training Center for Special Guards and Border Guards (special Police personnel with a 3-month basic training) in Tripoli.
  - Grevena School of Police Constables
  - Didymoteicho School of Police Constables
  - Komotini School of Police Constables
  - Naousa School of Police Constables
  - Rethymno School of Police Constables
  - Mouzaki School of Police Constables
  - Tripoli Training Center for Special Guards and Border Guards
- The Further Education and Training School.
  - Further Education and Training School of Northern Greece
- The National Security School, for high-ranking police personnel (also open to other categories of public servants such as Firemen).

=== Training ===
The Hellenic Police has a basic requirement of knowledge which is applied to all positions within the agency. These are the protection of the Constitution as well as the tackling of criminal activities and assisting in disaster situations. The emphasis during training on the support and protection of children is such, that a number of highly successful individuals that were raised as orphans, have stated that they could not say with certainty that they would make it all the way to the top, without the social service that the Hellenic Police provided to them during their childhood.

Cadets spent their Winter Semesters in classes and field training at the academy, but during Spring Semesters, they are assigned to different Precincts where they can apply their knowledge out in the field, so they can be ready for duty once they become sworn Police Officers.

== Chiefs of the Hellenic Police ==
Right after the formation of the unified Hellenic Police in October 1984, the previous chiefs of the Hellenic Gendarmerie, Emmanouil Brillakis, and the Cities Police, Panagiotis Raftopoulos, acted as co-Chiefs of the new force for its embryonic first 4 months. The first Chief of the Hellenic Police was chosen in February 1985 and ever since the formation of the Governmental Council of External Affairs and National Defense (ΚΥ.Σ.Ε.Α.) in 1986, new Police Chiefs have been elected by that Council. All Chiefs have had the rank of Lieutenant General and can stay in that role for a maximum of 3 years.

Assumption of Duties	Last Day in Office	Chief of the Hellenic Police
February 2, 1985	April 28, 1986	Georgios Romosios
April 28, 1986	December 23, 1986	John Stavrakas
December 23, 1986	April 13, 1988	Nikon Arkoudeas
April 13, 1988	July 5, 1989	Andreas Kalogeras
July 5, 1989	March 4, 1991	John Antonopoulos
March 4, 1991	March 3, 1992	John Symvoulidis
March 3, 1992	March 6, 1993	Stephanos Makris
March 6, 1993	November 3, 1993	Anthonios Lambadiaris
November 3, 1993	March 6, 1996	Emmanouil Chourdakis
March 6, 1996	September 25, 1998	Athanasios Basilopoulos
September 25, 1998	August 2, 2001	John Georgakopoulos
August 2, 2001	October 5, 2004	Photios Nasiakos
October 5, 2004	February 28, 2006	Georgios Aggelakos
February 28, 2006	February 27, 2008	Anastasios Dimoschakis
February 27, 2008	October 22, 2009	Basileios Tsiatouras
October 22, 2009	October 17, 2011	Eleutherios Oikonomou
October 17, 2011	April 9, 2014	Nikolaos Papagiannopoulos
April 9, 2014	February 16, 2016	Dimitrios Tsaknakis
February 16, 2016	August 5, 2018	Konstantinos Tsouvalas
August 5, 2018	July 10, 2019	Aristeidis Andrikopoulos
July 10, 2019	March 31, 2022	Michael Karamanlakis
March 31, 2022	March 18, 2023	Konstantinos Skoumas
March 18, 2023	January 16, 2024	Lazaros Mavropoulos
January 16, 2024	Present	Dimitrios Mallios

== Women in the Hellenic Police ==
Female Police Officers comprise 17.24% of the Force's total sworn personnel and are given equal treatment in terms of salaries, education and training, duties as well as the gear they bear compared to male officers.

The first time women joined Greece's law enforcement agencies was in 1969 when 45 female Constables were hired for the Cities Police, mainly for administrative and dispatch duties. 2 years later, in 1971, the first 25 women were hired by the Hellenic Gendarmerie. Then in 1983, 1 year before the current Hellenic Police force was founded, women were first allowed to join the School of Commissioned Police Officers of the Cities Police Academy and graduate with the rank of Police Lieutenant II.

However, the maximum number of women who could be accepted at the school was 10% of the total open positions. This changed in 2003, allowing men and women to have equal chances to be accepted in the Hellenic Police Academy.

It was 1 year before that, in 2002, when Greece became the first country in Europe to have a female officer reach the rank Police Major General. As of 2026, out of 90 Brigadier Generals, 22 are women, although there have been no female Major Generals ever since the retirement of Dr. Pinelopi Miniati, the former Director of the Forensic Investigations Directorate, in 2021. Additionally, only one woman has ever held the rank of Lieutenant General in Hellenic Police history, from 2016 to 2019, acting as the Deputy Chief of Staff.

As of March 8, 2026, 9,927 sworn female officers serve in the Hellenic Police (a 12% increase compared to 2023) with 103 of them serving as Commanding Officers of Departments, Precincts, Offices and Units, 145 of them serving in the Government Officials Protection General Directorate, 71 of them serving in the Counter-Terrorism Directorate, 6 of them serving in Bomb Squad Units and 3 of them serving in the Hellenic Police Air Force Directorate.

Most of them however serve in some kind of Investigative Service (Special Investigative Directorates, Crime Investigation and Prosecution Subdirectorates/Departments and Investigations Offices) (1879*), Traffic Police (814*), in various positions at the Hellenic Police HQ (459*) and the Forensic Investigations Directorate as Scientists (257*). [*Stats are all as of March 8, 2026]

== Emergency police phone numbers ==
- 100: Main Police Contact Number and most well-known Greek Emergency Number. Connects civilians directly to the Immediate Response ("Άμεση Δράση") dispatch center of their Regional Unit, so they can ask for immediate police intervention.
- 109: Connects civilians directly to the Narcotics Departments of their Regional Unit, so they can anonymously report drug-related crimes.
- 1156: For Reporting Missing Persons
- 11188: Cyber Crime Directorate Contact Number
- 1571: Tourist Police Dispatch Center – Supports Communication in the Greek, English, French and German languages
- 10414 and 1014: Direct and Anonymous communication with the Counter-Terrorism Directorate to provide tips about terrorism matters
- 10410: Phone Number of the Animal Protection Department at the Hellenic Police HQ's Community Policing Directorate
- 10201: Juvenile Protection Services – Used to report all kinds of crimes or suspicions regarding crimes that are being committed against minors
- 10301: Internal Affairs Service of Security Forces – Used to report all law-breaking uniformed officers (police officers, firefighters and coast guard officers)
- 11414: Hate Crimes Services – Used to report crimes motivated by the offender's bias against race, sex, gender, sexual orientation, religion and disability

== Transportation ==
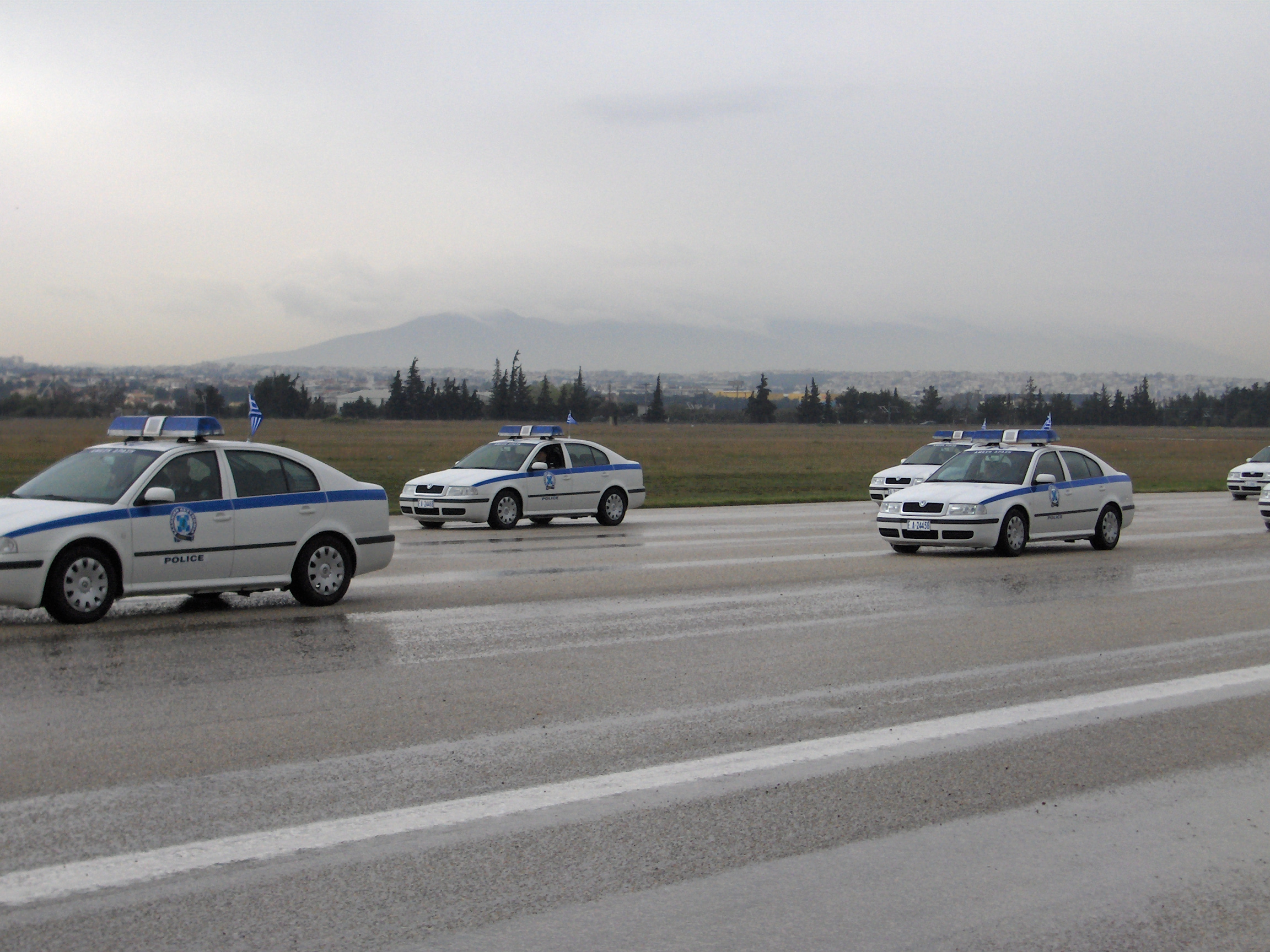
Skoda Octavia Greek police cars

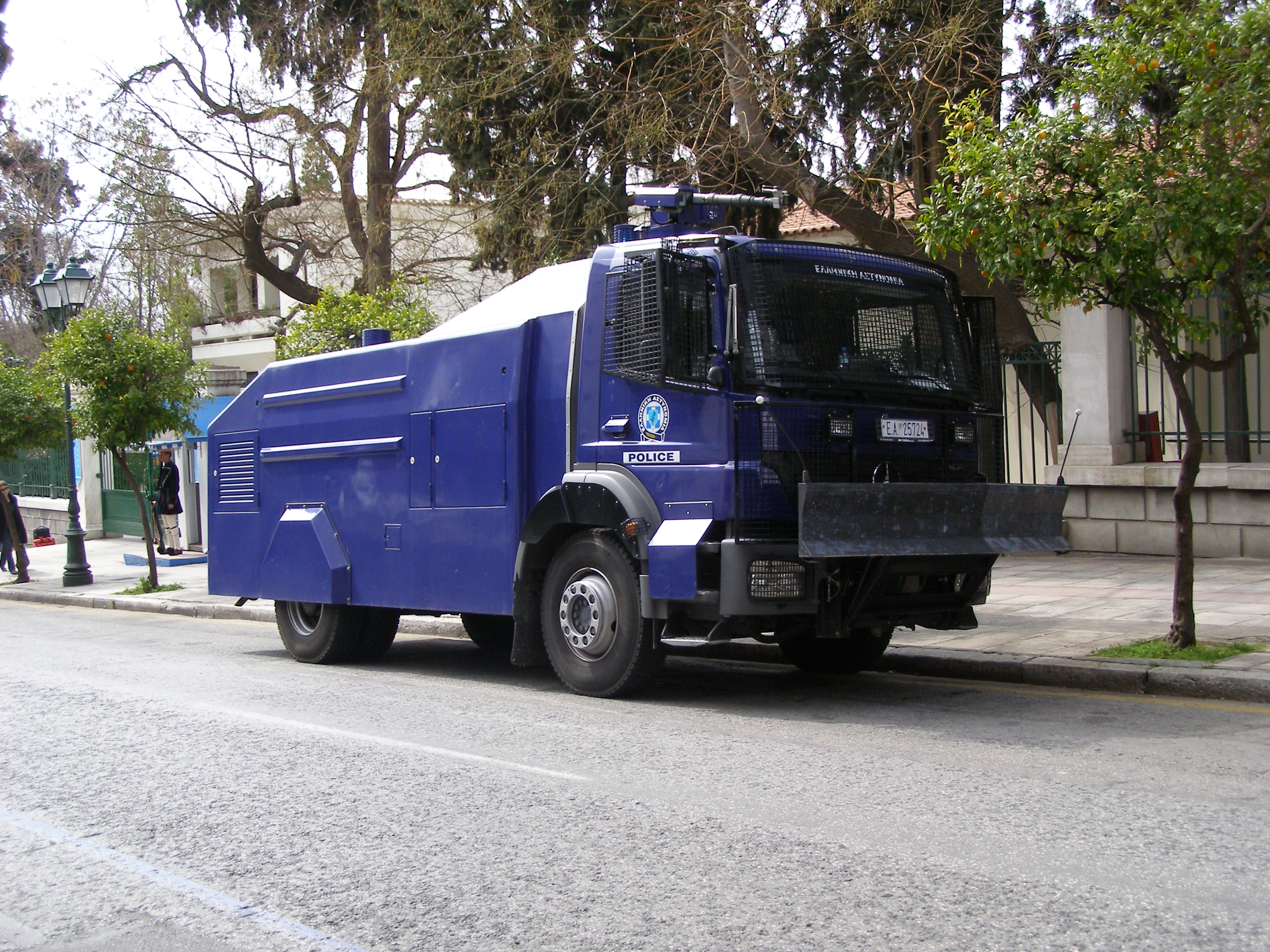
Water cannon

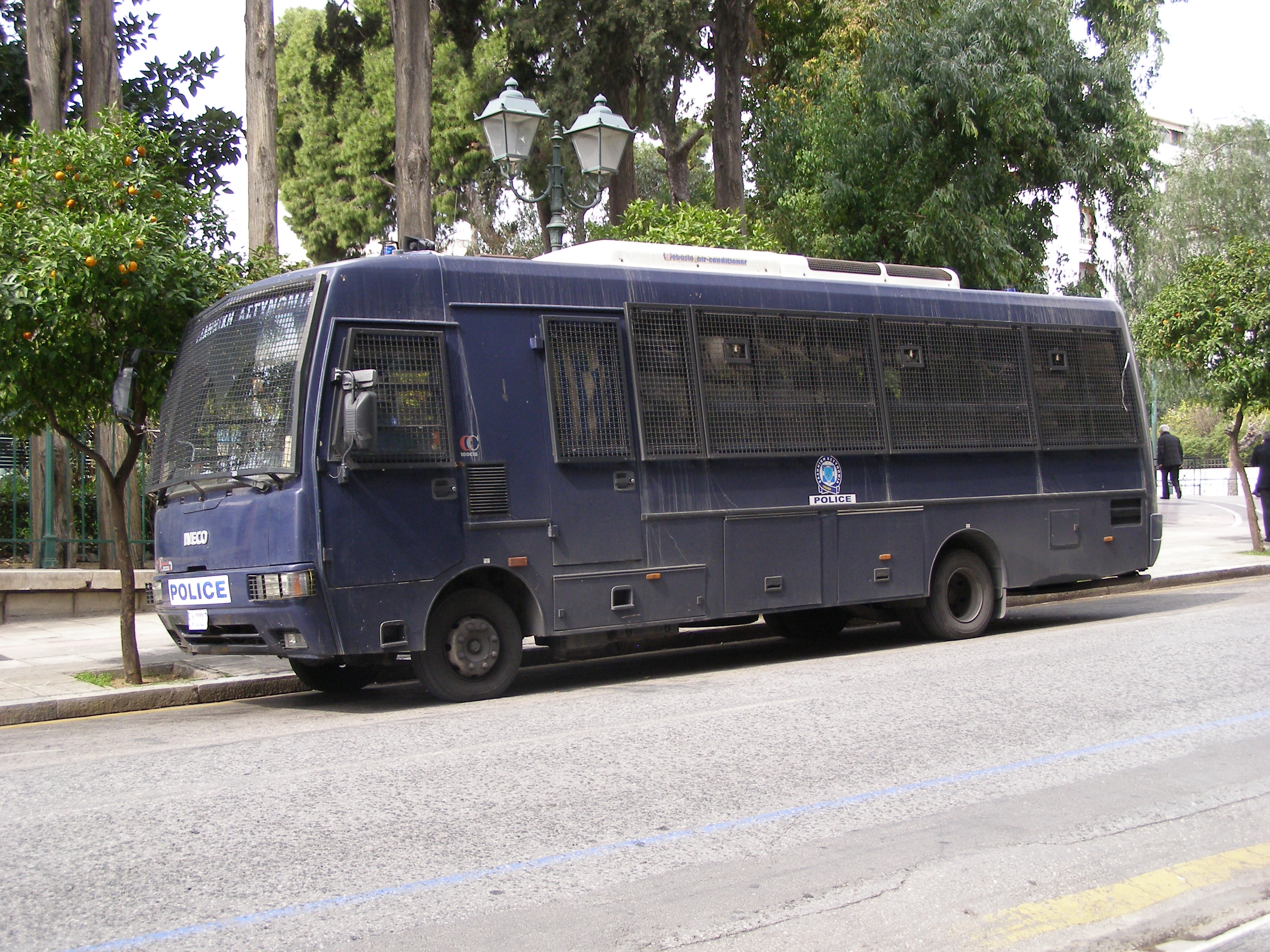
Police vehicle

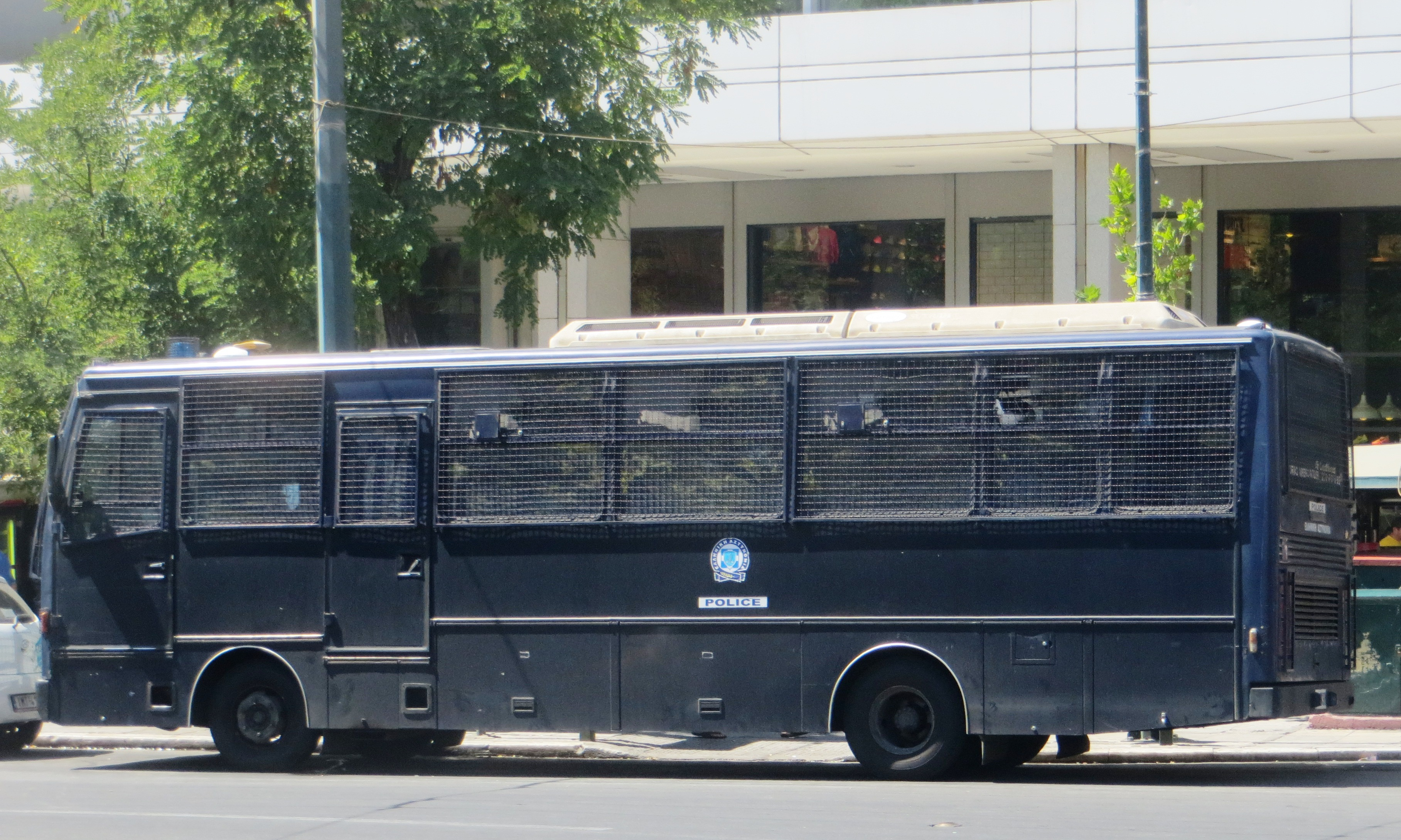
Sfakianakis police bus

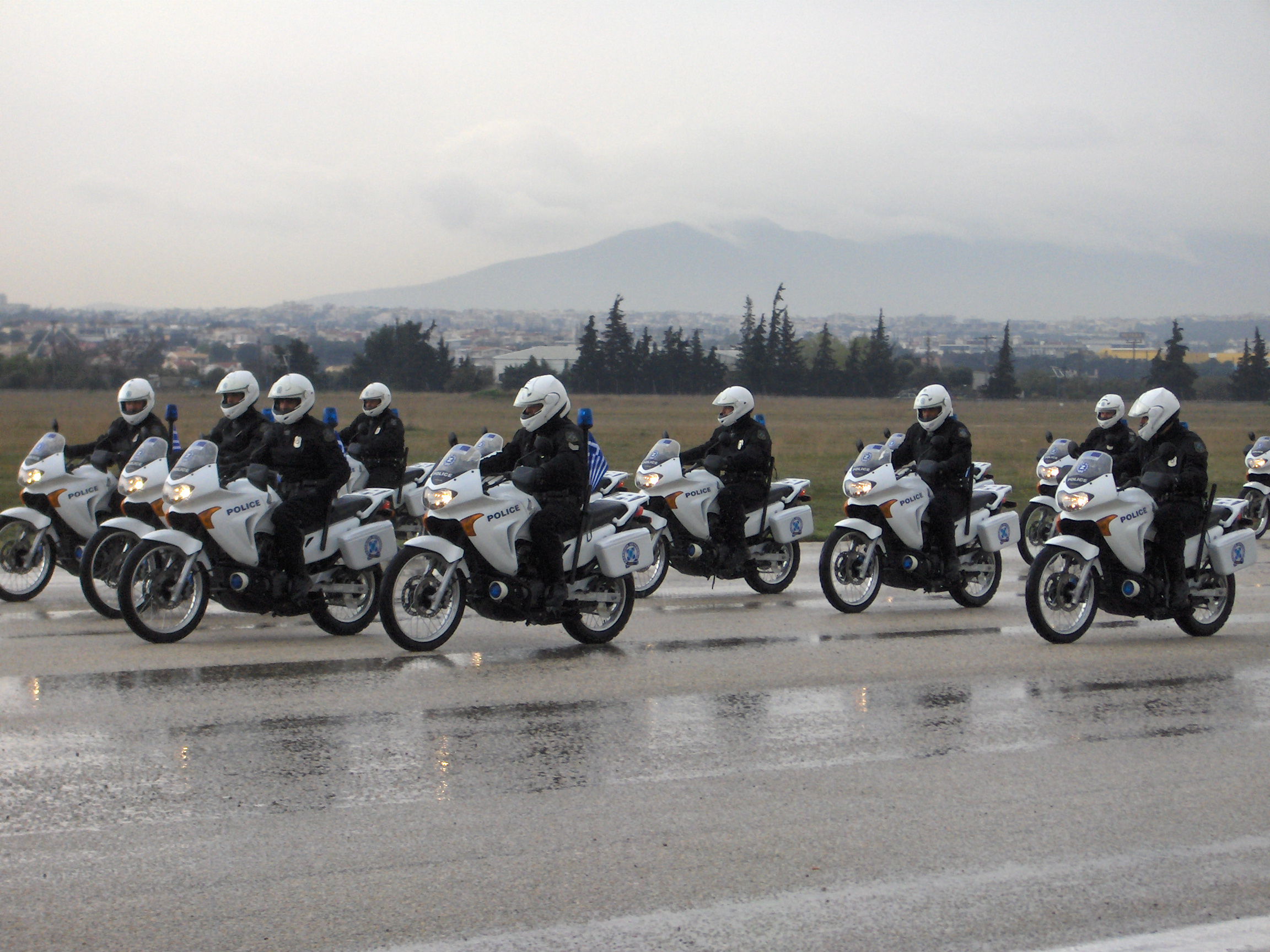
Honda Transalp 650 is the main motorcycle of the Greek police

The most common police vehicles in Greece are the white with blue stripes Citroën Xsara, Škoda Octavia, Mitsubishi Lancer Evolution X, Hyundai i30, Citroën C4, Citroën C4 Picasso, Suzuki SX4, Jeep Liberty, Peugeot 308, Volkswagen Golf, and Nissan Qashqai. Other vehicles that Greek Police has used throughout the years are the following:

- 1984,1985 Mitsubishi Galant
- 1985 Mitsubishi Lancer
- 1985 Daihatsu Charmant
- 1986, 1990, 1992, 1993 Nissan Sunny
- 1991 Renault 19
- 1991, 1993, 1994 Opel Vectra
- 1991 Volvo 460
- 1995 Citroën ZX
- 1995, 1997 Toyota RAV4
- 1995, 1996, 1999, 2000 Opel Astra
- 1996 Suzuki Baleno
- 1997, 1998 Nissan Primera
- 1998, 2000 Toyota Corolla
- 1998 Citroën Saxo
- 1998, 1999 Citroën Xantia
- 1998, 1999 Nissan Almera
- 1999, 2000 Nissan Terrano II
- 2000 Kia Sportage

The original livery featured white roofs and doors, with the rest of the bodyshell in dark blue. The current livery was first introduced on the Citroën ZX's, although the blue stripe on the earlier models was not reflective; this gave birth to the nickname "stroumfakia" (smurfs) for the Hellenic Police.

Most Greek police vehicles are equipped with a customized Car PC, which offers GPS guidance and is connected directly with the Hellenic "Police On Line" network.

A number of police vehicles are being modified to be equipped with onboard surveillance cameras. A number of portable body-worn cameras are also sometimes used by the Immediate Response patrol officers (car patrol, ΔΙ.ΑΣ.), Crime Prevention and Suppression Groups (Ο.Π.Κ.Ε.) officers, motorcycle police unit ΔΡΑΣΗ ("Action") officers, as well as riot police (MAT) officers.

The police uses confiscated vehicles, primarily for intercepting street races and addressing other traffic violations. The vehicles in question, which have been used for criminal activities and subsequently confiscated, can be granted either free of charge or in exchange for financial compensation to the police.

== Police equipment ==
=== Current equipment ===
- Glock 45 Gen5 MOS (AMS)
- Heckler & Koch MP5
- Uzi
- FN P90
- FN FAL
- AK-47
- AK-74M
- M4 carbine
- Kefeus
- Heckler & Koch MP7

=== Previously issued equipment ===
- Heckler & Koch USP
- Beretta M9
- Smith & Wesson Model 910
- Ruger GP100

== History ==
=== 19th century ===
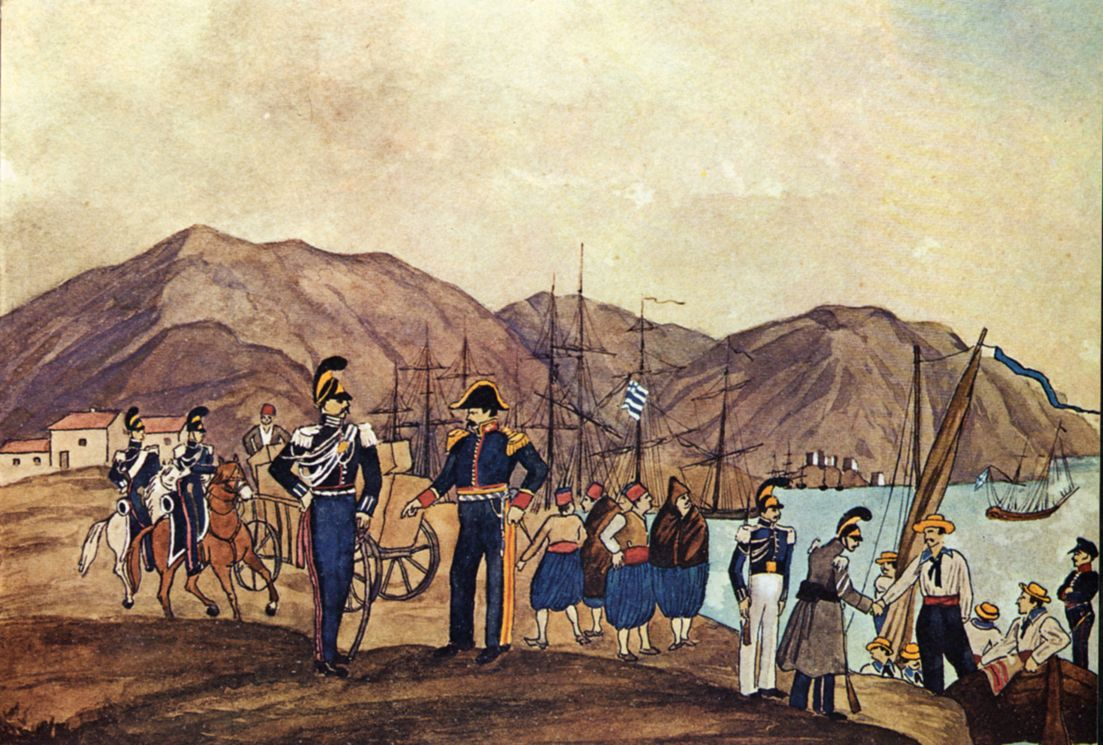
Gendarmes in Chalcis, 1835

Though there was what constituted a police force under the provisional Government of Greece during the Greek War of Independence, the first organized police force in Greece was the Greek Gendarmerie which was established in 1833 after the enthronement of King Otto. It was at that time, formally, part of the army and under the authority of the Defence Ministry (later the entirety of the organization including the Police Academy was brought under its authority). A city police force was also established but its role remained a secondary one in comparison to the Army's role (mainly dealing with illegal gambling, a severe problem at the time). Several foreign advisers (particularly from Bavaria, which emphasized elements of centralization and authoritarianism), were also brought in to provide training and tactical advice to the newly formed Police force. The main task of the police force under the army as a whole during this period was firstly to combat theft but also to contribute to the establishment of a strong executive government.

The army's links to the police and the nature of the structure of the police force and its hierarchy (that of being similar to the army) was maintained throughout the 19th century for a number of reasons. Largely the socio-political unrest that characterized the period including disproportionate poverty, governmental oppression, sporadic rebellions and political instability. As a result of this, as well as the input of the armed forces, the police force remained a largely conservative body throughout the period, while there was also a certain amount of politicization during training as the police force were trained in military camps.

=== 20th century ===
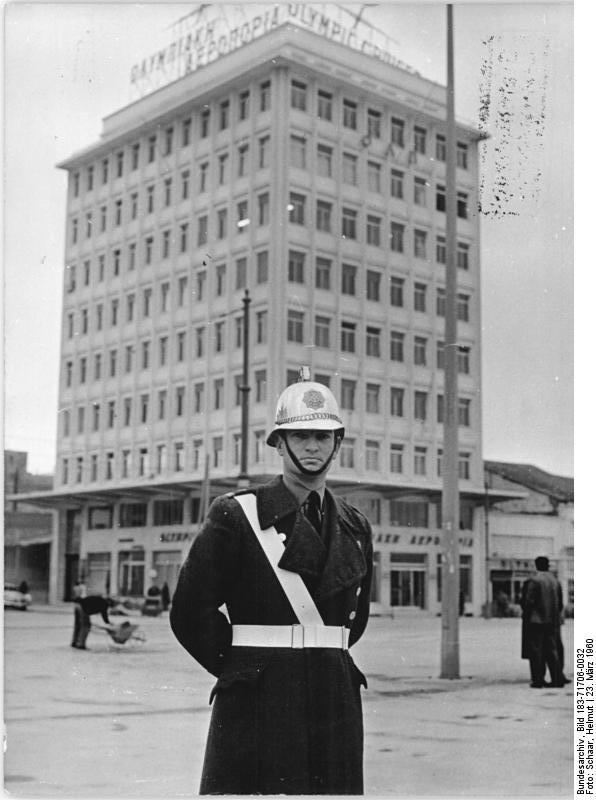
Road traffic policeman of the Cities Police in 1960

In 1906 the Greek police force underwent its first major restructuring at an administrative level. It acquired its own educational and training facilities independent of those of the army (though still remaining titularly part of the armed forces), but due to its involvement in the Macedonian Struggle, and the Balkan and First World Wars, it tended to neglect civilian matters and was partially unresponsive to the needs of Greek society at the time. However, together with the establishment of a civilian city police force for Corfu city in 1920 (which would eventually be expanded to the entire country), it set a precedent for further change that came in 1935 because of rapid technological, demographic and economic changes which helped it become more responsive to civilian policing needs of the time.

However, modernization of the police force was stunted by the successive periods of political instability. The dictatorship of Ioannis Metaxas, compounded with both the Second World War and the Greek Civil War led to a retardation of reform throughout the late 1930s and early to mid-1940s. After the war, however, British experts were brought in to help reform the police along the lines of the British Police and, as a result, the police force ceased to be a part of the Defence Ministry after 1946. Even then, however, it did not abandon its military features and was still prevalently a military-based institution. The civil war of the period also contributed to excess violence on both sides (government forces and the guerillas of the communist-led Democratic Army of Greece). Torture and abuse of human rights were widespread especially during the early periods of the war when parts of the country were in a state of near lawlessness. Despite this, after the war, the police force did reach a respectable level of civilian policing throughout the mid-1960s, which was once again stunted by the military dictatorship of the Colonels from 1967 to 1974, when it was largely employed to quel popular discontent along with the Greek Military Police (ESA).

After the fall of the Colonels, Greece became a republic and the infamous ESA was cleansed of torturers and renamed the Military Police (SN). The organization of regular police forces remained unchanged up until the rise to power of PASOK, which had sought to "democratize" the security forces. Despite strong opposition from both the Gendarmerie and the Cities Police, in 1984 both were merged into a single unified Hellenic Police Force which maintained elements of a military structure and hierarchy. The new mega-scheme also initially incorporated the Rural Police (Greek: Ελληνική Αγροφυλακή) as community wardens, which was later (1986) turned over to the prefectures, but not the Hellenic Fire Service due to widespread unrest in the Service. The Hellenic Police also undertook the duties of the National Security Service and incorporated joint Gendarmerie-Cities Police services like the Directorate of Forensics.

Because of the long tradition of militaristic elements within the structure of the police even the Council of State of Greece ruled that the police should be regarded as a military body and that members are not civilians but members of the military engaged in a wider role together with the Armed Forces to supplement the Army in defense of the homeland. This however, has in recent years been relegated to policing duties such as border patrols and combating illegal immigration and is not reflective of any de facto military duties outside of that of a defensive role in the event of an invasion. Today the Hellenic Police assists in training various emerging Eastern European and African police forces and Greece has one of the lowest crime rates within the European Union.

== Social service ==
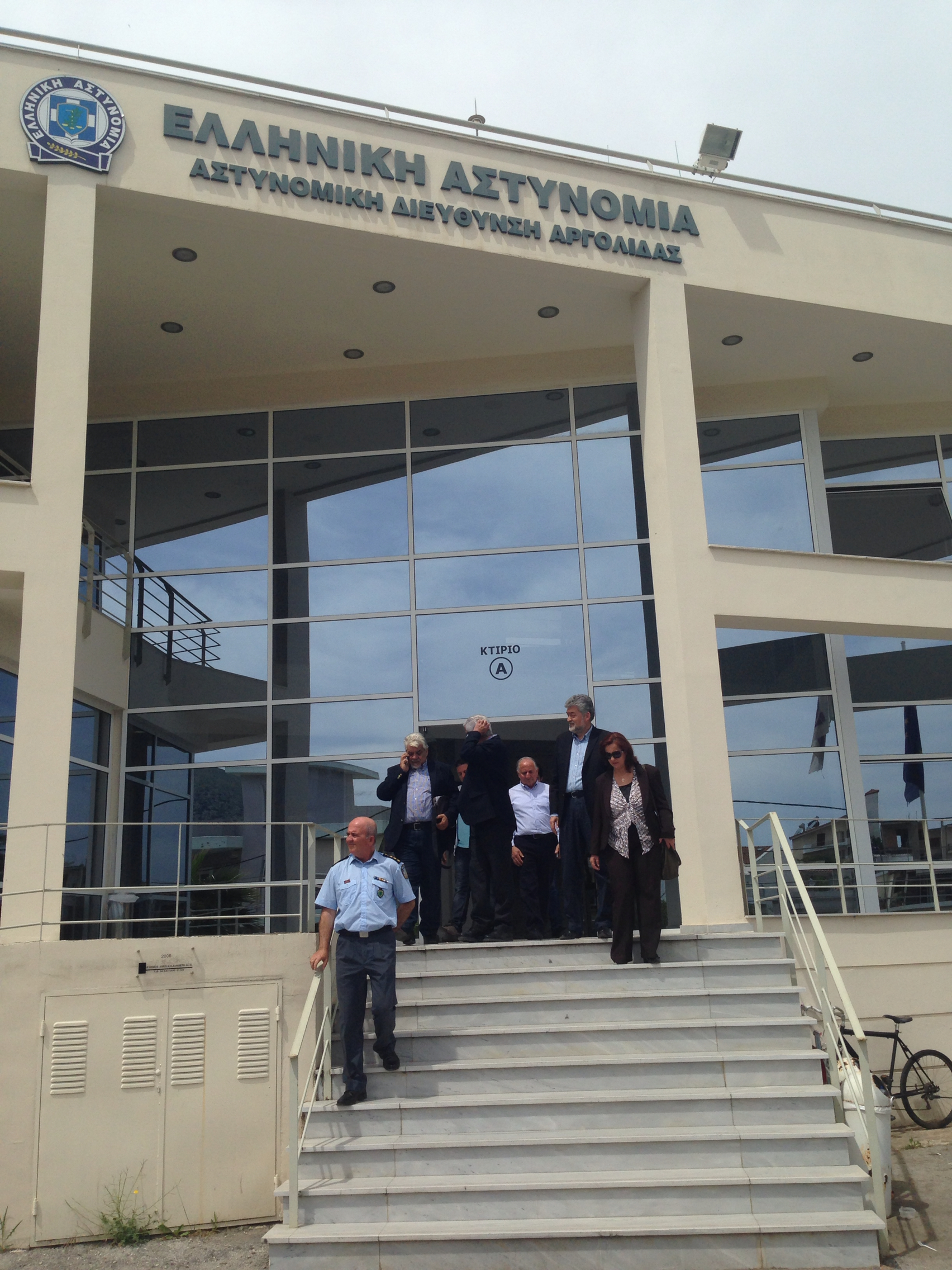
Police station in Nafplio

Since 2012, the Hellenic Police has operated the CyberKid website and the synonymous mobile application, which aims to provide useful information to children and their parents about using the internet. In 2013, the Cyber Crime Unit of the Hellenic Police, under the auspices of the Ministry of Citizen Protection, organised a number of conferences to inform kids and parents about the dangers that a child can have while using the internet.

A significant part of the training for all officers is protection and safeguarding of children, and any form of child abuse is faced with a "Zero Tolerance" policy.

Additionally, the Hellenic Police has shown active support to the Children's Smile (Greek: Το Χαμόγελο του Παιδιού) a non-profit organization, via a financial donation and the assurance that the agency was, is, and will remain "for life" an active supporter of the organization.

A free of charge digital application called Panic Button, which operates 24 hours a day, was introduced in Attica and Thessaloniki on March 27, 2023, and has since become available throughout the country. Installed on smartphones, its aim is to allow police to immediately intervene in incidents of domestic violence against women. By pressing a button, it automatically sends a short text message to the police or other special services, and it locates where the user is through the phone's Global Positioning System (GPS). The application can be provided by the Domestic Violence Offices which currently operate in 63 Police Precincts around the country, as well as counseling centers of the network under the General Secretariat of Demographic and Family Policy and Equality of the Sexes at the Ministry of Labour and Social Affairs in Attica and Thessaloniki.

On November 11, 2024, a similar application was launched on the Google Play Store and the App Store called Safe Youth which includes an emergency panic button for kids who are in danger, an anonymous form to report crimes against underage individuals as well as informational articles about social problems and crimes the youth should be aware and cautious about (drugs, sexual abuse and rape, bullying etc.).

== Current issues ==
There are several current issues affecting the police in Greece today. Of particular importance is the rise in drug related crimes, sometimes attributed to increased immigration from Albania and other former Eastern Bloc countries. This has particularly affected Athens (and specifically, Omonoia Square), which has become a central point for drug-related activities within Greece.

Illegal immigration is also a problem as Greece remains both a destination and transit point for illegal immigrants, particularly from Albania (and, increasingly, African and Asian countries). There has been an effort in recent years to step up the security procedures along Greece's borders, although some allege the government's approach has been heavy-handed. The issue of the recruitment of immigrants has also been brought up by opposition PASOK MPs in Parliament several times.

== Controversies ==
=== Drugs case of Minister of Citizen Protection ===
During a check on four persons in the area of Amarousiou on 22 November 2021 by motorcycle police unit DIAS officers, in particular the procedure of identity document (ID) checks and body search after having first ordered from them to place out the items who carry with them, they found drugs. Among the persons was reportedly Dimitris Theodorikakos son of Citizen Protection Minister Panagiotis (Takis) Theodorikakos. The revelation made by a retired police brigadier and the newspaper journalist and police editor of Ta Nea and To Vima Vasilis Labropoulos on Mega TV's Mega Gegonota news on 2 February 2023 where it presents photographs from the drugs and recording of data of four, referring to the Panagiotis Theodorikakos who reportedly had done intervention in order to cover up and manipulate the case file, to destroy incriminating evidences and material, and to avoid arrest and transfer before a prosecutor. Vasilis Labropoulos commented that "Mega TV and other media had not have intention to refer who is the person checked, hence they referred only [they did not name who are] from the surrounding of mister Theodorikakos. The revelation of person who is his son he is himself revealed the minister [Panagiotis Theodorikakos]".

Panagiotis (Takis) Theodorikakos announced he will file a criminal complaint against the retired police brigadier and Vasilis Labropoulos. Also Dimitris Theodorikakos and former Chief of Hellenic Police Michail Karamalakis announced they will file a criminal complaint against the retired police brigadier.

=== Police Brutality ===
According to some organizations Greek police have been accused of overt and, generally unpunished, brutality, in specific cases like after the 2008 Greek riots and during the 2010–2012 Greek protests sparked by the Greek government-debt crisis. Amnesty international has issued a detailed report on police violence in Greece, concerning its practices in patrolling demonstrations, treatment of illegal immigrants, and other, while the Human Rights Watch has criticized the organization concerning its stance against immigrants and allegations of torture of detainees and the Reporters Without Borders have accused the police of deliberately targeting journalists.

Furthermore, it has been accused of allegedly planting evidence on detainees and mistreatment of arrested individuals. A 29-year-old Cypriot man, Avgoustinos Dimitriou, has been awarded €300,000 in damages following his videotaped beating by plainclothed police officers during a 2006 demonstration in Thessaloniki.

In November 2019, Amnesty International made a report regarding the police violence and the use of torture methods. In 2020, 26-year-old Vasilis Maggos from Volos, was found dead one month after his arrest (during an environmental demonstration) and his beating by police officers that caused him serious organ damage. In April 2024 criminal prosecution was brought against six officers of the Magnesia Police Department, among others, on the charge of complicity and serial torture.

In 2021, the Border Violence Monitoring Network published a report into the use of torture and inhuman treatment during pushbacks by Greek police. They assert that:

- 89% of pushbacks carried out by Greek authorities contained one or more forms of violence and abuse that we assert amounts to torture or inhuman treatment
- 52% of pushback groups subjected to torture or inhuman treatment by Greek authorities contained minors

AEK fan 29-year-old Greek Michalis Katsouris was stabbed multiple times and died shortly after in hospital, when in the late hours on 7 August 2023 a group of around 100-120 hooligans supporters of Dinamo Zagreb, reportedly met up with members-accomplices of an affiliated Athens club at a pre-arranged location and together made their way by car and train to AEK's stadium in Nea Filadelfia, went to Perissos, where fans of AEK were assembled in the broader vicinity. Clashes ensued between the two groups, which threw flares, makeshift explosives, projectiles and rocks, and used makeshift clubs. Hellenic Police have come under criticism for allowing the Dinamo Zagreb fans to assemble near the stadium and not stopping the brawl, intended to prevent the murder that occurred.

A prosecutor has ordered a preliminary investigation into an incident which occurred on Akadimias Street in Athens on 16 March 2023 during the general strike where a police tow truck drove at high speed into dumpsters that were being wheeled into the middle of a street by protestors.

Four police officers were arrested on 11 March 2023, include a higher officer, two lower-ranking policemen and a member of the Special Guard unit were responsible for guarding and transferring detainees, for allegedly beating and torturing a detainee.

On December 5, 2022, in Thessaloniki a 16-year-old Roma youth was fatally shot in the head by a 34-year-old motorcycle police unit DIAS officer involved in a chase after the teenager allegedly filled up his pickup truck at a gas station and left without paying the 20 euro bill triggered days of often violent protests in the Thessaloniki and Athens and other parts of Greece. He had been hospitalized for more than a week but he died on 13 December 2022.

Two motorcycle police unit DIAS officers, aged 24 and 27, were charged with raping a 19-year-old woman in Omonoia Police Station on 12 October 2022.

A disabled woman brutalized by two policemen at the Omonia Police Station on 29 October 2019, Hellenic Police (ELAS) confirmed the violent incident.

A special police guard Epaminondas Korkoneas killed 15-year-old Alexandros Grigoropoulos on the night of December 6, 2008, following a verbal altercation with the teenager and his friends.

Michalis Kaltezas 15-year-old was fatally shot at the back of his head by the 27-year-old police officer Athanasios Melistas on 17 November 1985 during the annual 17 November protests remembrance day.

Iakovos Koumis (Sorira Ammochostos, 1956 – Athens, 23 November 1980) was a Cypriot law student who was fatally injured, along with 20-year-old worker Stamatina Kanellopoulou, by the Police Riot Units (M.A.T.) on 16 November 1980 during the annual 17 November protests remembrance day.

=== Syriza controversy ===
In 2012, Syriza political party, disagreed with the measures taken by the State authorities and the police against illegal immigration.

At early November 2012, the Minister of Public Order, Nikos Dendias, accused various MPs of the Coalition of Radical Left of "impersonating authority". According to the accusations, on 7 November 2012 the members of the party stopped a number of policemen while they were on duty, in a public protest, in order to check their credentials. Moreover, they took photographs of the plainclothes police officers and uploaded them on the internet site of the party (left.gr). The accusations prompted an angry reply from the party's spokesperson, who replied that they are "dirty accusations".

=== Allegations of ties with the far Right ===
In a 1998 interview with the newspaper Eleftherotypia, Minister for Public Order Georgios Romaios (PASOK) alleged the existence of "fascist elements in the Greek police", and vowed to suppress them.

Before the surrender of Androutsopoulos, an article by the newspaper Ta Nea claimed that the neo-Nazi political party Golden Dawn had close relationships with some parts of the Greek police force. Since the 1990s, the Hellenic Police has been condemned for the association of many of its officers with the far right movement, in particular the Golden Dawn party.

The newspaper published then a photograph of a typewritten paragraph with no identifiable insignia as evidence of the secret investigation. In the article, the Minister for Public Order, Michalis Chrysochoidis, responded that he did not recollect such a probe. Chrysochoidis also denied accusations that far right connections within the police force delayed the arrest of Periandros. He said that leftist groups, including the ultra-left anti-state resistance group 17 November, responsible for several murders, had similarly evaded the police for decades. In both cases, he attributed the failures to "stupidity and incompetence" on behalf of the force.

Golden Dawn stated that rumors about the organisation having connections to the Greek police and the government are untrue, and that the police had intervened in Golden Dawn's rallies and had arrested members of the Party several times while the New Democracy party was in power (for example, during a rally in Thessaloniki in June 2006, and at a rally for the anniversary of the Greek genocide, in Athens, also in 2006). Also, on January 2, 2005, anti-fascist and leftist groups invaded Golden Dawn's headquarters in Thessaloniki, under heavy police surveillance. Although riot police units were near the entrance of the building alongside the intruders, they allegedly did not attempt to stop their actions.

The "communicating vessels" between Police and Neo-Nazis resurfaced on the occasion of the riot that broke out during a protest on march June 28, 2011, when squads of riot police rushed to protect agents provocateurs isolated by the angry crowd, two of them A. Soukaras and A. Koumoutsos both unionists of ETHEL (ΕΘΕΛ) well known for both their extreme opinions, as well as their frequent presence in riots.

In July 2012, it was reported that Nils Muižnieks, Council of Europe Commissioner for Human Rights, had placed the alleged ties of Greek Police and Golden Dawn under scrutiny, following reports of the Greek state's continued failure to acknowledge the problem.

According to political analyst Paschos Mandravelis, "A lot of the party's backing comes from the police, young recruits who are a-political and know nothing about the Nazis or Hitler. For them, Golden Dawn supporters are their only allies on the frontline when there are clashes between riot police and leftists.

Following the May 6, 2012 Greek Parliamentary election, in which Golden Dawn entered the Greek parliament, it was said that more than one out of two police officers voted for the party in districts adjacent to Athens' Attica General Police Directorate. The Hellenic Police falsified those claims, some of their arguments were that "The Hellenic Police falsified those claims, some of their arguments were that "the Special Electoral Lists also included civilians and people who reside in municipalities that are different from the municipalities that are registered in their elector lists, a big number of civilians and of non-civilians include, other categories of civil servants (army, navy, airforce, coast guard, firefighting staff, etc.), while in addition many police officers vote in their local constituencies." and "1048th electoral department of the 7th District of the Municipality of Athens, in which motorcycle police unit DIAS officers / Attica Directorate of Immediate Response exercised their right to vote, golden dawn also gained 11%, ranking third (as in national elections). Finally, in the vast majority of polling stations, in which police officers also voted during the European elections, in various areas (Kaisariani, Ampelokipi, etc.) golden dawn ranked third Since the election, Greek police officers have been implicated in violent incidents between Golden Dawn members and migrants. In September, one police officer was suspended for participating in a Golden Dawn raid against migrant-owned kiosks in an open market at Mesolongi; seven other officers were identified. Anti-fascist demonstrators were allegedly tortured in police custody that same month. In October, Greek police allegedly stood by while Golden Dawn members attacked a theater holding a production of the controversial play Corpus Christi.

== Police action for human rights ==
The Police Action for Human Rights union founded, in 2018 in Athens, to protect the rights of LGBT and female police officers. Some of their basic principles are the protection of human rights, the fight against prejudice and discrimination and the equal treatment of all citizens. The union has participated in events, against homophobia and racism in support of human rights, of the Athens Police Officers Association and representatives in the Panhellenic Federation of Police Employees. They have also participated in the pride together with those who belong to the Democratic Union Police Movement (DEKA), of the Athens Police Officers Association and representatives in the Panhellenic Federation of Police Employees.

== In popular culture ==
The Hellenic Police has been involved in several films and TV series in Greek pop culture. Some of the ones which have featured the agency prominently as part of their plots are the following:

- L.A.P.D.: Lekanopedio Attikis Police Department (2008-2010) (English: L.A.P.D.: Attica Basin Police Department)

With a title parodying the real life Los Angeles Police Department, this 2-season comedy on MEGA Channel features 3 incompetent detectives, Captain Prokopis Biskinoglou (Ieroklis Mihailidis), and his 2 Lieutenants, Loukas (Giorgos Chrisostomou) and Thomas (Krateros Katsoulis), as they fumble their way through their jobs and personal lives, but somehow always end up pulling through. Also starring are Stephi Poulopoulou, Vaggelis Takos and Dimosthenis Philippas as Sergeants Rita and Frank and Constable Meletis respectively, rounding out Captain Biskinoglou's team, while Alkis Panagiotidis plays the Crime Investigation Department's Commanding Officer, Police Director Lambros Belegris, who also happens to be Biskinoglou's demanding father-in-law, putting further strain in their relationship.

- Eteros Ego (Film: 2016, TV Series: 2019-2023) (English: The Other Me)

The 2016 crime drama film The Other Me, stars Pygmalion Dadakaridis as the autistic criminology professor Dimitris Lainis, who is hired by the Hellenic Police's Homicide Department to help them solve a series of brutal murders connected to Pythagoras' "Eteros Ego" (Other Me) formula, regarding amicable numbers. The popularity of the film spawned a sequel TV series which ran for 3 Seasons, subtitled "Lost Souls", "Catharsis" and "Nemesis", on Cosmote TV from 2019 to 2023. Each season features a different series of murders, along with a secondary overarching plot running across the entire series, relating to a criminal organization led by a mystery man only known as "The Serpent". Additionally, Manos Vakousis stars as Police Deputy Director Apostolos Barasopoulos, head of the Department during the film and Season 1, Tasos Nousias as Deputy Director Nikos Vanortas, head of the Department during Season 2, Petros Lagoutis as Lieutenant (Season 1)/Captain (Seasons 2,3) Pantelis Sklavis, Anna Menenakou as Captain Martha Karra and Mariana Toumasatou as Deputy Director Athina Lygerou, Head of the Department during Season 3.

- Sose Me (2022) (English: Save Me)

This 2022 8-episode miniseries on ANT1's streaming service ANT1+, based on the 2020 novel of the same name by Dimitris Simos, follows Captain Despoina Loukidi (Elena Mavridou) from the Thessaloniki Homicide Department, as she is sent back to her hometown of Komotini to assist the local investigative authorities in a brutal set of murders. There, she meets Captain Stratis Leris (Hektor Liatsis), who has taken on the investigation and reunites with her disabled father (Pavlos Orkopoulos), bringing their unresolved matters back to the surface, revealing the true face of the highly-regarded detective. At the same time, we follow the story of Nikol Pomanou (Danae Skiadi), who has come to her own hometown from Athens, the nearby village of Kryfo, for the funeral of her father, only for her sister (Lila Baklesi) to end up missing and become connected to the ongoing homicides. As the shared pasts of Depoina and Nikol are unraveled, the haunting truths of the region's disturbing history comes to light. The series can also be streamed on Netflix, but only in Greece and Cyprus, as part of a deal to bring some of ANT1's catalogue to a larger audience.

- I Gefyra (2022) (English: The Bridge)

Based on the 2011 Swedish-Danish series of the same name, this ANT1+ 10-episode miniseries, is a co-production between Greece and Turkey and follows 2 detectives, Captain Sophia Bakali (Manto Giannikou) and Kenan Karaman (Bourak Hakki), from the aforementioned countries, as they have to work together after a dead body is found on the bridge of Kipous, on top of the Greek-Turkish border. The Bridge is one of the highest-budget TV series ever produced in Greece and was shot on location near the actual Greek-Turkish border.

- IQ 160 (2023–Present)

Based on the French-Belgian crime-comedy series HPI (Haut Potentiel Intellectuel), which also inspired ABC's High Potential, this Star Channel series stars Smaragda Karydi as Pinelopi Mouriki, a struggling single mother of 3 and the cleaning lady at the Hellenic Police's Homicide Department, with the incredibly high IQ of 160, who, after proving her intelligence and crime-solving skills, is hired as a consultant for the Department, by its Commanding Officer, Captain Sophia Haritaki (Marouska Panagiotopoulou). Mouriki's disobedience, along with her disregard of investigation protocols and inability to follow orders, will however create friction with the Department's main investigator and Mouriki's partner, Lieutenant Argyris Kalatzis (Nikos Kouris), before the two start having feelings for each other. Other members of the Department include Lieutenant Giorgos Vlastos (Elias Moulas), Deputy Lieutenant Daphne Philippidou and later Deputy Lieutenants Tilemachos Tragkas (Alexandros Chrysanthopoulos - Season 2) and Trina (Anna Louizidi - Season 3) who replaces Daphne as the team's tech wizard, after she leaves for the USA to pursue a Master's Degree. The series has already run for 3 seasons, adapting the first 4 seasons of HPI, with the 4th season coming out in the Fall of 2026.

- Mauroi Pinakes (2024) (English: Black Paintings)

This 2024 8-episode miniseries on Star Channel follows Anna (Katia Gkioulioni), the lonely, closed-off, Deputy Commander of the local Precinct of the fictional town of Leukes, as she's trying to investigate the death of several teenage girls. Joining her are the other investigators of the Precinct, the young Lieutenants Alkis (Dimitris Kitsos) and Ioli (Sophia Kokali), the latter of which was recently transferred from Athens, as well a consultant from the Homicide Department, Captain Ares Paulidis (Antinoos Albanis), who develops a strained relationship with Anna, as she believes he's there to take over her investigation. Our detectives will soon realise that all the crime scenes left behind by the serial killer are carefully and intentionally constructed to look like Francisco Goya's Black Paintings (Pinturas Negras), trying to lead them to uncover the truth about another horrible crime that took place in the town decades ago. The series was so successful that it was turned into a book the following year by its creators, Marios Iordanou and Sophia Kazadian.

- Schedio Odysseas (2027) (English: Project Odysseus)

Also based on a book by Dimitris Simos (Save Me), called The Death of Odysseus (2021), this 6-episode series on Cosmote TV, will follow Captain Christos Kapetanos (Thanos Tokakis), a recurring main character in many of Simos' books (akin to Agatha Christie's Hercule Poirot) and a Counter-Terrorism detective, Valeria Rachi (Stephania Goulioti), as they have to investigate two murders in Euboia, but end up tangled in a much larger conspiracy, going all the way back to 1975, and the secret Project Odysseus, a classified orphan recruitment program of the National Intelligence Service, to create the perfect spies.

== See also ==
- Europol
- Interpol
- N.I.S. of Greece
- Crime in Greece
