= Attica General Police Directorate =

Coordinates: 37°59′16″N 23°45′22″E

The Attica General Police Directorate (Greek: Γενική Αστυνομική Διεύθυνση Αττικής, commonly used in the abbreviation ΓΑΔΑ, GADA) is an administrative unit of the Hellenic Police. Its headquarters are in Athens. It has been described as Athens' equivalent of Scotland Yard.

In 2012, activists protesting against the Golden Dawn party alleged that they were tortured at its headquarters.
