= National Security Service (Greece) =

The National Security Service or YPEA (Greek: Υπηρεσία Εθνικής Ασφάλειας, ΥΠΕΑ), originally called General Directorate of National Security or GDEA (Γενική Διεύθυνσις Εθνικής Ασφαλείας, ΓΔΕΑ) was a Greek intelligence and domestic security service, active between 1958 and 1984. Initially it was under the control of the Interior Ministry, and later under the control of the Ministry of Public Order.

YPEA was the agency responsible for keeping dossiers on the political beliefs of Greek citizens, and as such it was widely feared and despised among the general population. It was founded in 1958, after the left-wing United Democratic Left managed to win 25% of the popular vote, only nine years after the end of the Greek Civil War. The man responsible for creating YPEA, Evangelos Kalantzis, was a notorious Deputy Interior Minister who had held important positions in the Metaxas dictatorship.

Throughout its existence, the agency was staffed by police, gendarmerie and civil personnel, but was always led by a retired general of the Hellenic Army. The first director was Lt. General Iraklis Kontopoulos, until the electoral victory of the Centre Union in 1963, when Lt. General Aristeidis Vlachos was appointed. Following the Iouliana of 1965, the royalist Lt. General Sofoklis Tzanetis was appointed to the post. Under the Regime of the Colonels (1967–74), the service was headed first by Lt. General Spyridon Vellianitis, and then by Major General Georgios Thomopoulos. With the restoration of democracy in 1974, the service was renamed and placed under General Pantelis Kalamakis, a royalist arrested by the military junta, and then under Lt. General Dimitrios Kapelaris. After the socialist PASOK of Andreas Papandreou became the government in 1981, it installed Lt. General Anastasios Bouras, another officer who had resisted the junta, as the service's director. In 1984, as part of a wide-ranging reform of the police and security services, the PASOK government completely dissolved and liquidated YPEA as an organization, with duties passing onto the Hellenic Police's Directorate of State Security.
