= Anarchism in Greece =

Anarchism in Greece traces its roots to ancient Greece but was formed as a political movement during the 19th century. It was in the ancient era that the first libertarian thoughts appeared when philosophers based on rationality questioned the fundamentals of tradition. Modern anarchism in Greece emerged in the 19th century, heavily influenced by the contemporary European classical anarchism. Because of the Bolshevik success in the Russian Revolution of 1917 and the rise of the Communist Party, anarchism faded after the first decades of the 20th century. The collapse of the military junta put an end to the monopoly of the political power from the Right, whereas the dissolution of the Soviet Union diminished the allure of the Communist Party of Greece allowing anarchist groups to gain pace in Athens and other cities.

== Precursors ==
Beliefs, opinions and sentiments that are close to anarchist core values were expressed in Ancient Greece. With the appearance of presocratic thought, rational inquiry during the classical and Hellenistic period, challenged traditional beliefs, religion and authority itself. Socrates skepticism towards the state and its passionate support of the individual's moral freedom were among the first-ever libertarian critiques. Cynics' contribution to philosophical anarchism was the distinction between the man-made laws and nature's law, fiercely rejecting the former. Stoics followed the same worldview and Zeno of Citium, the main stoic philosopher, received the admiration of 19th-century anarchist, Piotr Kropotkin, who was impressed by Zeno's Republic- a community based on egalitarianism and friendly relations. A powerful play resonating with anarchism was Antigone, by Sophocles, where a young woman defies the orders of the Ruler and acts according to her consciousness.

== Ottoman era ==
According to some academics, shortly before and after the end of Ottoman rule in Greece, the socioeconomic relations of the Greek countryside reflected traits of Bakunian collectivism (decentralization and autonomy) creating a future audience for anarchist ideas. Discussing the second half of the 19th century, a source argued that the level of anarchist activity in the Ottoman Empire was comparable to that in Europe. Some of the Greek anarchists were born in the Ottoman Empire, for example Emmanouil Dadaoglou was from İzmir.

According to a study of anarchism in the late Ottoman Empire by Axel Corlu, Greek anarchists were significantly less than their Armenian or Bulgarian counterparts in the Ottoman Empire at the end of the 19th century. Corlu suggests that Greek anarchists were mostly focused in influencing events, struggles and structures in the Greek state rather than the Ottoman Empire.

== Early anarchism ==
Greek Democracy was the first anarchist paper in Greece. Its slogan: "Revolution is the law of progress."

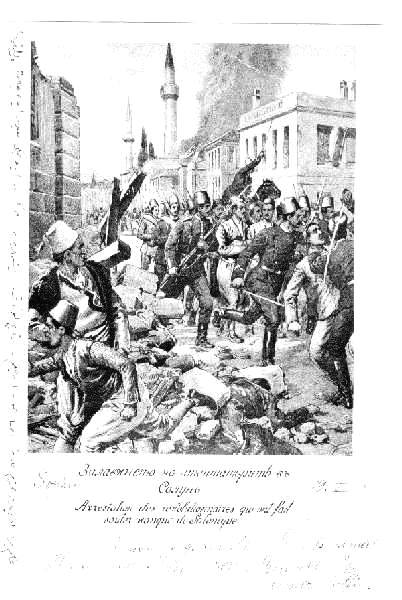
Bulgarian postcard depicting the arrest of Gemidzhii's living members, in Salonica, April 1903

Early anarchism in Greece traces to the mid-19th century and lasted through World War II. Early Greek socialist thought was dominated by anarchism. The most influential anarchist authors in Greek at the time were Bakunin, Andrea Costa, Kropotkin, and Jean Grave; for comparison, Marx and Engels were not translated in Greek until 1893. Individuals having ties with Italy and Italian immigrants imported anarchism to the Greek mainland with the Ionian islands as a midpoint. Geographical proximity to Italy and a large Italian political immigrant community dating back to the 1848 revolutions explains why the port town of Patras saw the first organized anarchist group. Patras had organized meeting places, a viable local press and publishing activity. Various individuals were inspired by the expansion of European classical anarchism. The first anarchist publication in Greece appeared in September 1861, in the daily newspaper Φώς (Light), issue 334. In the main article of the paper, titled "Anarchy," part A, the writer, Dimos Papathanasiou, employed classical anti-authoritarian rhetoric, characterized anarchy as the greatest good and claimed that state authorities live at the expense of the people.

The first Greek-organized anarchist group was the Democratic Club of Patras (Δημοκρατικός Σύλλογος Πάτρας). Founded in 1876 and affiliated with the anti-authoritarian Jura Federation of the First International, the Democratic Club helped to create a federated network of similar Greek groups. They also published the first anarchist newspaper in Greece, Greek Democracy (Ελληνική Δημοκρατία). In its declaration of principles, the Democratic Club claimed that "poverty and ignorance are the greatest wounds of the people" and supported the liberation of Greeks in the Ottoman Empire. Emmanouil Dadaoglou and the Italian Amilcare Cipriani were involved in the club's founding, having previously participated with other anarchists in the 1862 Athens uprising, though details of Dadaoglou's life are unverified.

In 1876, the Democratic Club sent a greeting message to the International Anarchist Congress in Bern, and in December it accedes to the decisions of the congress. The same year, an anarchist working club was founded in Syros. In 1877, the Democratic Club took part in the Universal Socialist Congress in Ghent, where it was represented by Italian anarchist Andrea Costa. The first government crackdown on members of the club followed soon afterwards. Its members were jailed for months after being accused of a conspiracy against the king, only being released after an intervention by parliamenent member R. Choidas. It played an instrumental role in the tannery and shipyard strikes of 1879.

In the Lavrion mines, the influence of anarchist and socialist politicized foreign workers (mostly from Italy and Spain) played a vital role in a series of anarcho-syndicalist leaning strikes in the mines during the late 19th century. The most famous of which took place in 1896 in Lavrio. It was organized by the anarchist union Kosmos and was accompanied by dynamite attacks, resulting in several casualties both among the workers and the mining company's guards. Despite the periodic success of Greek anarchists in mobilizing the working class, the number of core members of anarchist clubs remained small. In 1892, the clubs in Patras, Athens and Pyrgos had 40, ten and 7 members respectively.

Pyrgos, a Peloponnese city close to Patras, was another place where anarchist ideas flourished along with other socialist currents. The fight against loan sharks and the heavy taxation by the state fueled anarchist thought among small raisin producers in the Peloponnese which was the home of various anarchist groups in the late 19th century. New Light (Νέον Φως) was a western Peloponnese weekly newspaper that voiced anarchist ideas (local and international). It was first published in October 1898 by the lawyer Vasileios Theodoridis. Its aim was to unify the subversive people of the Western Peloponnese to face social problems. The newspaper contained articles by Drakoulis, translations of the works of Pavlos Argyriadis, republications of texts that first appeared in Athenian magazines, and news about the Greek and the international labor movement. It also contained adages of the Orthodox Church Fathers and Charles Fourier as well as translations of texts by Bakunin, Kropotkin and Girard.

The anarchist groups of the Peloponnese were the strongest in Greece until the early 20th century. They conducted lively propaganda work in the cities and their surroundings as opposed to "authoritarian" socialists who were more interested in parliamentary politics. They encouraged abstention in the elections of 1899 and mobilized against loan sharks and taxation in the name of raisin producers. They did not seek the support of the state to confront the current crisis but they denounced instead state mechanisms of oppression.

Zestful socialist Stavros Kallergis was arguing in The Socialist (a newspaper he was editing) that socialism is the path towards Anarchism. The Socialist funneling the contemporary socialist thought of Europe into Greece, ranging from moderate socialist to anarchist opinions, over the course of the 1890s.

Persecution against anarchists intensified in the summer of 1894. The assassination of Sadi Carnot by an anarchist led to a barrage of attacks against the anarchists by the press, and in particular by Asty, the official organ of Charilaos Trikoupis' party. Many anarchists and socialists were put on trial and this led others to either flee the country or relocate in isolated parts of Greece. Similarly, many radical publications closed down and mainstream activity was reduced.

In 1896 in Patras, Dimitrios Matsalis, a sandal maker, murdered Dionysios Fragkopoulos, a banker and currant merchant, and injured Andreas Kollas. He declared, "I acted alone. By killing I did not aim at people but I stroke the capital. I am an anarchist, and as an anarchist I am in favor of violence." He committed suicide in prison. Fragkopoulos' assassination arguably intensified the erosion of collective identities as the persecutions continued.

Persecuted anarchists and anarcho-syndicalists fled from Patras during the last years of the 19th century. The persecution began right after the International Conference of Rome for the Social Defense Against Anarchists, leading many anarcho-syndicalists that moved to Athens to establish the Anarchist Workers Association (Αναρχικός 'Εργατικός Σύνδεσμος). They took part in the anarchist international congress held in Paris in 1900. Epi ta Proso (Επί τα πρόσω) was another group of anarchist intellectuals publicly advocating for anarchism in the Peloponnese that finally ended up in Athens before being dissolved.

As in the rest of Europe by that time, the so-called propaganda of the deed was employed by the Boatmen of Thessaloniki, a group of Bulgarian anarchists based in Salonica (then part of the Ottoman Empire), and Alexandros Schinas, who assassinated King George I in 1913 for reasons of either anarchist conviction or mental illness. (Note: Kemp 2018, p. 181: "The accepted position is that [Schinas] was a homeless alcoholic with Anarchist tendencies."; p. 183: "The assassination of King George I is commonly thought to be an example of Anarchist propaganda of the deed (indeed, Schinas is typically referenced as a follower of this philosophy) or the work of a lone madman, motivated by non-political factors. Schinas has been characterized both as an educated and criminally motivated Anarchist and as a hopeless and mentally unbalanced alcoholic."; p. 184: "Schinas remains an elusive figure and a controversial one. The results of his actions are readily apparent, but what prompted them and, indeed, the details of the man behind them remain ephemeral, drawn as they are from muddled statements provided by multiple sources.")

In 1916, the anarcho-syndicalist Konstantinos Speras was a key organizer of a miners strike in the island of Serifos. The strike was violently opposed by the police, leading to the death of four workers and wounding others. The workers, supported by their wives, responded by throwing stones, killing three of the police and routing the others away. Although the strike was organized by an anarchist and the workers took control of municipal buildings (telegraph tower, police headquarters, town hall), the strikers raised a French flag and asked for protection from the French fleet, which at the time had ships stationed in the neighboring island of Milos. The strike and the aftermath resulted in the improvement of working conditions in the mines and the first application of the 8-hour working day in modern Greece.

The Greek anarchist movement's momentum subsided in the 1920s as, among many factors, the Greek working class turned to Marxist ideology and the Communist Party of Greece, known for its hostility towards anarchists, was founded. Reflecting popular Greek desire for a strong state, an organized anarchist movement was dismantled in the 1930s and 1940s, between the effects of the Metaxas Regime, the Axis occupation of Greece, and the Greek Civil War. In times of changing government, Greeks relied on local government for resistance and security.

An important figure of Greek anarchism is Plotino Rhodakanaty, born in 1828. His birthplace is disputed, some authors cite Athens, others cite other European capitals. Nevertheless, he is considered one of the most important figures in Mexican socialist thought.

== The Polytechnic uprising and the subcultural movement ==
The new phase of the Greek anarchist movement began as part of the resistance to the Greek military junta of 1967–1974. In this period, Greek anarchism broke away from its anarcho-syndicalist origins and became organized around small direct action groups. Students played a significant role in this new phase. Students returning from Paris, where they had taken part in the events of May 1968 and been introduced to leftist and anarchist ideas, started spreading these ideas among the radical youth. In 1972, Guy Debord's The Society of the Spectacle was published in Athens, along with other Situationist texts. Mikhail Bakunin's God and the State and Peter Kropotkin's Law and Authority followed. In 1971, Diethnis Vivliothiki (International Library), a publishing and political team was founded. Christos Konstantinidis was one of the founding figures, and translators such as Agis Stinas contributed. The Black Rose bookshop carried publications of Diethnis Vivliothiki.

Interest in anarchism swelled with the anti-junta movement, and the 1973 Athens Polytechnic uprising was a flash-point for the junta's opposition. The group that initiated the Polytechnic uprising included a minority of anarchists and leftists. The moderator of the anarchist group was Christos Konstantinidis. Anarchists were branded as provocateurs by the Communist Youth of Greece as they expressed slogans not directly related to the student's demands (i.e. they were calling for sexual freedom, social revolution and the abolition of the State). The resonance with the French 1968 movement was clear. Some demonstrators also used slogans with anarchist overtones, such as "Down with Authority" and "People Revolt." The uprising is commemorated annually with a multi-day march; anarchists often use the occasion to denounce the political regime of the day. The annual protests promote a subculture that sees resistance to authority as one's duty.

On 4 May 1976, the first autonomous anarchist rally took place at Propylaea. The aim was to express political and pacifist messages, while the country was facing severe issues with its neighbor country, Turkey. Some major slogans of the demonstration were "Turkish workers are our brothers" and "The Aegean Sea belongs to its fish."

Greek anarchism remained a small subculture after the fall of the junta but grew into a movement following riots in 1981. In December 1979, protests took place as the Konstantinos Karamanlis government voted in the statutory act no. 815, which aimed to reduce the university exam periods and set a time limit on the allowed length of period. The university occupation movement of 1979–1981 was largely instigated by anarchist and leftist groups. Near the Polytechnic, the neighborhood of Exarcheia became a "free zone," where leftists, anarchists, hippies, and others were in charge. Throughout the late 20th century, Greek radical leftists referred to their cause by various names (autonomous, anti-authority, alternative) while police and the public generally labeled all revolutionary leftists as "anarchists."

On 17 November 1980, a large student demonstration took place to commemorate the abolishment of Greek junta. Severe street fights occurred, and two protesters were killed. In 1981, when PASOK (The PanHellenic Socialist Movement) came to power, there was a decline of the extra parliamentary left. A big moment that helped attest to the self-confidence of the anarchist movement were protests to a far-right conference hosted at the hotel Caravel (among the participants was Jean-Marie Le Pen of Action Française). The meeting was disrupted and confrontational tactics and street fighting became a trademark of a new major Greek social movement.

Demonstrations and clashes between anarchists and police took place almost daily in Athens between 1985 and 1986. The confrontation between the police and anarchists escalated during the 1985 Polytechnic uprising anniversary demonstration when a group of anarchists set a riot police car on fire. One of the riot policemen (MAT, Units for the Reinstatement of Order), Athanassios Melistas, shot a 15-year-old anarchist, Michalis Kaltezas, in the back of the head, killing him instantly and sparking large riots in Athens and Thessaloniki and the occupation of the University of Athens's Chemistry Department. Police forces entered the university the next morning after receiving permission from the Commission of University Asylum, whose president was Dean Michalis Stathopoulos. There was a heavy use of tear gas and a brutal arrest of 37 people. The anarchist movement staged demonstrations with thousands of participants in Athens. In retaliation against Melistas, the Marxist–Leninist Revolutionary Organization 17 November killed Nikolaos Georgakopoulos and injured fourteen other MAT officers in a 1985 police bus bombing.

The anarchists proposals were in contrast to the legalistic approach of the Greek Communist Party, which at the time was enjoying parliamentary participation. Exarcheia became increasingly perceived as a no-go zone for police, as clashes occurred merely with the sight of officers.

Alternative media and punk subcultures proliferated anarchist thought among Greek youth in the 1980s and 1990s, spreading messages against neoliberalism, reactionary populism, liberal democracy, and the state. By the late 1980s, anarchism had turned towards a broader spectrum of issues: gender inequalitiy, patriarchy, racism towards immigrants, and ethnic minority repression (Slavic and Turkish). Anarchist squats emerged in this era, among which Villa Amalia and Villa Lela Karagianni were the most prominent.

== Contemporary ==
The collapse of the USSR had a profound impact not only on anarchism but on the international circumstances of Greece as well. Greek anarchism reached a peak of activity between 1989 and 1995, reinforced by a disappointment with Greek mainstream politics. The 1990–93 Mitsotakis government agenda included an attempt to enforce neoliberal policies. The 1990s was the era that the anti-authoritarian movement became more prominent and had active participation among student riots against government plans for the privatization of the education sector. The most circulated publications of the era were The Void Network and The Children of the Gallery.

In the new millennium, with capitalism and neoliberalism viewed as advancing throughout the world, Greek anarchists participated in the anti-globalization movement. New collectives, such as the Antieksousiastiki Kinisi in Exarcheia and its associated newspaper, Babylonia, became popular among rebellious youth. Athens Indymedia and Antieksousiastiki Kinisi were founded in 2001 and 2003 respectively.

On 6 December 2008, the lethal shooting of 15-year-old Alexandros Grigoropoulos by a policeman in the Exarcheia district in Athens, generated immediate social unrest that quickly escalated into large-scale riots. The significant repercussions that followed were the most intense to occur in Greece since the fall of the military dictatorship. Within a short period of time, anarchists, leftists, and sympathizers rioted and attacked banks, police vehicles and government offices in the area with unusual coordination. The fact that the murder of Alexandros occurred in Exarcheia was of major symbolic significance, as police presence in the area was considered to be an intrusion to a "ground occupied by the antagonistic movement" and was felt by some as an attack against the anarchist movement.

The Greek Government of the time (Prime Minister Konstantinos A. Karamanlis) chose to have a 'defensive' approach on the events that were taking place. The aim was to avoid further civil disorder and instances of potential violence. Other political parties tried to take advantage of the situation and organized nine demonstrations in three days.

The parliament building was besieged for weeks by angry crowds. For a month, large protests were taking place in many major Greek cities, with a lot of them resulting in conflict with the police and arson attacks on government buildings, shops and banks. On multiple occasions during the attacks, the violence against the police resulted in officers getting shot and/or severely wounded. An anarchist form of illegalism re-emerged during the insurrection when anarchist stole food from stores to distribute to people in need. Athens Indymedia, an open publishing, anti-authoritarian site which attracted significant audience during the 2008 revolt, paralleled the expansion of the anarchist choros within the Greek society. (Chóros, meaning "scene" or "milieu" in Greek, is the body of loosely associated anarchist groups and collectives in Greece.)

The rebellion that took place in 2008 was fueled, in part, by the prevailing economic insecurity. Anarchist groups organized and participated in protests against the austerity measures implemented by the government to resolve the economic crisis that was precipitated by the sovereign debt crisis. Certain anarchist groups and networks, in conjunction with activists affiliated to anarchist and libertarian ideas, during the beginning of the crisis, differentiated themselves from violence, becoming engaged in self-organization activities Spontaneous networks of students and other radicals were formed that followed an anarchistic approach on how they function. The influence of traditional Marxism was minimal.

In May 2010, a significant wave of protest occurred when the Greek parliament voted on its first austerity memorandum. During the protest, a petrol bomb was fired at the Marfin Bank in Stadiou Street and caused the deaths of three bank employees. After this tragic event, there was a notable drop in the attendance and frequency of protests, and more importantly the "ideological legitimacy", and anarchist momentum eased. However, no evidence about the perpetrator being an anarchist was provided, and the accused anarchist was declared innocent in the court. Several anarchist groups had been vocal about condemning the use of violence as a practice at Marfin and other such instances.

In 2013, there were several protests when anarchist Nikos Romanos was arrested for bank robbery and the police digitally altered his mug shot in order to cover several bruises that were inflicted during his arrest. Amnesty International described this as a "culture of abuse and impunity in the Greek police".

As of 2013, anarchist groups that have claimed responsibility for violent attacks include the Lovers of Lawlessness, Wild Freedom and Instigators of Social Explosion, Gangs of Consciousness, Lonely Wolf, the Untouchable Cell of Revenge and Untamed Desires.

In 2017, Interpol claimed Greece was one of the only three European Union countries (along with Italy and Spain) that appear to be dealing with anarchist terrorism.

== List of active groups and places ==
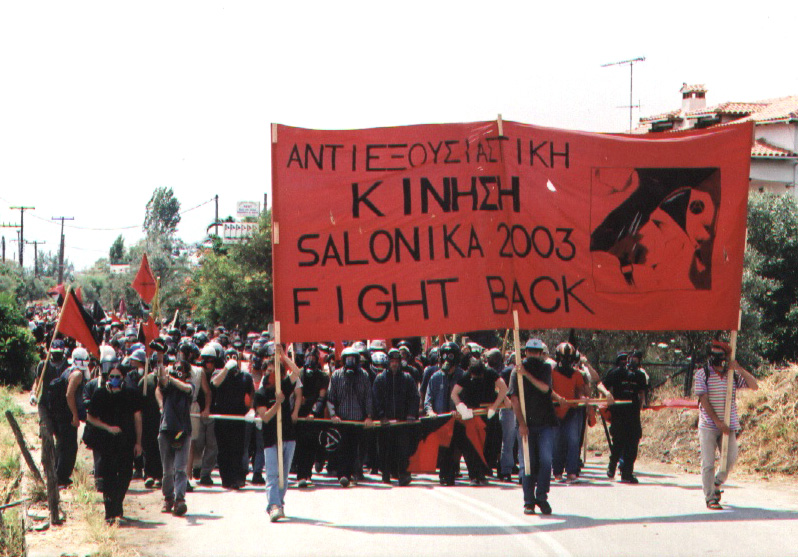
Anti-authoritarian rally in 2003

Groups

- Anarchist Federation, a platformist federation
- Anarchist Political Organisation (Anarchikí Politikí Orgánosi), a synthesis federation affiliated with the International of Anarchist Federations
- Anarcho-syndicalist Initiative Rocinante (Anarchosyndikalistikís Protovoulías – Rosinánte), an anarcho-syndicalist federation
- Anti-authoritarian Current (AK) (Antiexousiastikí Kínisi), an anti-authoritarian group in Athens
- Conspiracy of Fire Nuclei (Synomosía ton Pyrínon tis Fotiás), an individualist anarchist militant organization
- Industrial Workers of the World, a grassroots trade union affiliated with the International Confederation of Labor
- Libertarian Syndicalist Union (Eleftheriakí Syndikalistikí Énosi), an anarcho-syndicalist group affiliated with the International Confederation of Labour
- Rouvikonas, an anarchist collective in Athens, part of the Anarchist Federation
- Anarchist Cell for the Diffusion of Hostilities
- Incendiary Anarchist Intellect
- Conspirators for Immediate Reaction
- Kyriakos Xymitiris Commandos

Squats and other places

- Villa Lela Karagianni, a squat in Kypseli, Athens, named after Lela Karagianni
- K*Vox, a squat in Exarcheia, Athens
- Community of Squatted Prosfygika, a squat in Ampelokipoi, Athens
- YFANET Factory, a squat in Thessaloniki

Publications

- Diadromi Eleftherias
- Babylonia, newspaper affiliated to Anti-authoritarian Current
- Rocinante, anarcho-syndicalist publication
- Apatris, anarchist newspaper
- Alerta, anarchist news website, associated with the Anarchist Federation

Radio Stations

- Radiozones Anatreptikis Ekfrasis
- Elefthero Koinoniko Radiofono 1431AM

== See also ==
- Category:Greek anarchists
- List of anarchist movements by region
- Case of Irianna V.L.
- Assassination of George I of Greece

== Sources ==
- Alexandrakis, Othon (2010). The struggle for modern Athens: Unconventional citizens and the shaping of a new political reality (PDF) (PhD). Houston: Rice University. hdl:1911/62144. OCLC 794037864. Archived (PDF) from the original on 25 August 2019.
- Andronikidou, Aikaterini; Kovras, Iosif (2012). "Cultures of Rioting and Anti-Systemic Politics in Southern Europe" (PDF). West European Politics. 35 (4): 707–725. doi:10.1080/01402382.2012.682342. ISSN 0140-2382. S2CID 55377838. Archived (PDF) from the original on 19 July 2018.
- Apoifis, Nicholas (2014). Athenian Anarchists & Anti-authoritarians: Militant Ethnography & Collective Identity Formation (PhD). Macquarie University.
- Apoifis, Nicholas (2016). Anarchy in Athens: An ethnography of militancy, emotions and violence. Manchester: Manchester University Press. ISBN 978-1-5261-00597. OCLC 965476879.
- Chop, Volodimir M. (2008). "Participation of Priazov'ye Greek Colonists in the Makhnovist Movement (1918–1921)". Translated by Archibald, Malcolm. London: Kate Sharpley Library. Archived from the original on 2 January 2019.
- Corlu, Axel (2016). "Anarchists and Anarchism in the Ottoman Empire, 1850–1917". In Karahasanoğlu, Selim; Demir, Deniz Cenk (eds.). History from Below: A Tribute in Memory of Donald Quataert. Istanbul: Istanbul Bilgi University Press. pp. 553–583. ISBN 978-605-399-449-7. OCLC 961415226. Archived from the original on 21 February 2021.
- Hadjimichalis, Costis (2013). "From streets and squares to radical political emancipation? Resistance lessons from Athens during the crisis". Human Geography. 6 (2): 116–136. doi:10.1177/194277861300600209. ISSN 1942-7786. S2CID 220064083. Archived from the original on 21 February 2021.
- Kemp, Michael (2018). "Beneath a White Tower". Bombs, Bullets and Bread: The Politics of Anarchist Terrorism Worldwide, 1866–1926. Jefferson, North Carolina: McFarland. pp. 178–186. ISBN 978-1-4766-7101-7.
- Kiesling, John Brady (2014). Greek Urban Warriors: Resistance and Terrorism 1967–2014. Athens: Lycabettus Press. ISBN 978-960-7269-55-3. OCLC 907474685.
- Kitis, E. Dimitris (2015). "The anti-authoritarian chóros: A space for youth socialization and radicalization in Greece (1974–2010)". Journal for the Study of Radicalism. 9 (1): 1–36. doi:10.14321/jstudradi.9.1.0001. ISSN 1930-1189. S2CID 143750287.
- Kornetis, Kostis (2013). Children of the Dictatorship: Student Resistance, Cultural Politics and the 'Long 1960s' in Greece. Berghahn Books. ISBN 978-1-78238-001-6. Archived from the original on 2 January 2020.
- Marinos, Giannēs [in Greek] (15 July 2010). "Πόσο εύκολα ξεχάσαμε" [How easy we forgot]. To Vima (in Greek). Archived from the original on 2 September 2019.
- Marshall, Peter H. (1993). Demanding the Impossible: A History of Anarchism. Fontana. ISBN 978-0-00-686245-1. Archived from the original on 13 December 2019.
- Megas, Y (1994). The Boatmen of Thessaloniki: The Anarchist Bulgarian Group and the Bombing Actions of 1903. Trochalia (in Greek). ISBN 978-960-7022-47-9.
- Moran, Matthew; Waddington, David (2016). "Neoliberalism, Austerity, and Rage Against the State: The Greek Riots of 2008". Riots. London: Palgrave Macmillan UK. doi:10.1057/978-1-137-57131-1_5. ISBN 978-1-137-57130-4.
- Moskoff, Kostis [in Greek] (1985). Εισαγωγικά στην ιστορία του κινήματος της εργατικής τάξης [An introduction to the history of the working class movement] (in Greek) (2nd ed.). Athens: Καστανιώτης. ISBN 978-960-03-0070-3. OCLC 1039058446.
- Noutsos, Panagiotis (1995). Η σοσιαλιστική σκέψη στην Ελλάδα απο το 1875 ως το 1974 [Socialistic Thought in Greece from 1875 to 1974] (in Greek). Γνώση.
- Roos, Jérôme E.; Oikonomakis, Leonidas (2014). "They Don't Represent Us! The Global Resonance of the Real Democracy Movement from the Indignados to Occupy". In Porta, Donatella della; Mattoni, Alice (eds.). Spreading Protest: Social Movements in Times of Crisis. ECPR Press. pp. 117–136. ISBN 978-1-910259-20-7.
- Schwarz, A. G; Sagris, Tasos; Void Network, eds. (2010). "These Days Are for Alexis; Chronology: December 6–25, 2008". We Are an Image from the Future: The Greek Revolt of December 2008. Edinburgh: AK Press. pp. 77–81. ISBN 978-1-84935-019-8. OCLC 759726383. OL 24604918M.
- Siapera, Eugenia; Theodosiadis, Michael (2017). "(Digital) Activism at the Interstices: Anarchist and Self-Organizing Movements in Greece". TripleC. 15 (2): 505–523. doi:10.31269/triplec.v15i2.768. ISSN 1726-670X.
- van der Steen, Bart (2014). The City Is Ours: Squatting and Autonomous Movements in Europe from the 1970s to the Present. PM Press. ISBN 978-1-60486-683-4.
- Vasilaki, Rosa (2017). "'We are an image from the future': Reading back the Athens 2008 riots". Acta Scientiarum. Education. 39 (2): 153–161. doi:10.4025/actascieduc.v39i2.34851. ISSN 2178-5201.
- Vradis, Antonios; Dalakoglou, Dimitrios K. (2009). "Anarchism, Greece". In Ness, Immanuel (ed.). The International Encyclopedia of Revolution and Protest: 1500 to the Present. Wiley-Blackwell. pp. 126–127. doi:10.1002/9781405198073.wbierp0057. ISBN 978-1-4051-8464-9. Archived from the original on February 21, 2021.
- Williams, Dana M. (June 2018). "Contemporary anarchist and anarchistic movements". Sociology Compass. 12 (6) e12582. doi:10.1111/soc4.12582. ISSN 1751-9020.
