= Sylvia Papadopoulou =

- Born: Sylvia Papadopoulou (c. 1950); Greece
- Died: April 24, 2015 (aged 65); Athens, Greece
- Other name: The Black Rose (Mavro Rodo)
- Citizenship: Greece
- Occupations: Publisher, translator, anarchist
- Known for: Co-founder of The International Library; key figure in the Athens Polytechnic uprising; translator of anarchist literature into Greek
- Movement: Anarchism
- Partner: Christos Konstantinidis (1947–1992)

Sylvia Papadopoulou (in Greek: Σύλβια Παπαδοπούλου) (c. 1950–2015), nicknamed The Black Rose, was a Greek publisher and anarchist. She was one of the founders of The International Library group, the first anarchist group in contemporary Greece, and a notable figure in the Athens Polytechnic uprising, which she played a major role in launching.

Born in Greece around 1950, she revived the Greek anarchist movement alongside her partner, Christos Konstantinidis, and other companions. Their clandestine publishing house began distributing anarchist literature, which was then severely repressed by the Greek junta, throughout the country's universities. In this context, she translated several authors such as Bakunin, Kropotkin, and Volin, often serving as the first person to translate their works into Greek. During the Athens Polytechnic uprising, she strongly advocated for maintaining the occupation on the first day by supporting her group's proposal to continue it, effectively launching the insurrection.

Following the fall of the junta, Papadopoulou continued her anarchist activism, founded the Black Rose bookstore, and persisted in publishing and editing texts. She became its primary organizer after Konstantinidis's death in 1992 and maintained The International Library until 2003. At that time, facing prosecution by the Greek state for a payment default of approximately one thousand euros, she was forced to cease her publications. In 2008, she was noted for living in extreme poverty.

Papadopoulou died in 2015 in Athens and received a civil burial.

== Biography ==
=== Youth, a pioneer of anarchism in contemporary Greece and launcher of the Athens Polytechnic uprising ===
Sylvia Papadopoulou was born around 1950 in Greece.

In 1971, in the midst of the Greek junta (1967–1974), Papadopoulou was one of the founders of the group The International Library ('Διεθνής Βιβλιοθήκη'). Other members of the group included her partner, Christos Konstantinidis (1947–1992), and Nikos Balis. This clandestine group, clandestine because anarchism was harshly repressed by the dictatorship, is noted by several sources as the first anarchist group in contemporary Greece. The International Library, which was primarily involved in underground publishing activities, met at 2 Delfon Street.

Between 1971 and 1973, with the International Library, Papadopoulou translated works by Kropotkin, Bakunin, Volin, Rosa Luxemburg, and Guy Debord. Some of these authors or texts were translated into Greek for the first time by her.

According to historian CEP, Papadopoulou appears to have held a propaganda position within Greek revolutionary and student circles and intervened at the University of Athens to incite students to revolt against the junta. In 1972, she founded the newspaper Sidewalk (Πεζοδρόμιο), which was published clandestinely and distributed within these circles.

As early as February 1973, she was noted for participating in the unrest at the university; she and her group were responsible for a banner placed atop the Faculty of Law, which read Freedom. This event, captured in a photograph at the time, left a lasting mark on Greek political memory.

She was a driving force during the Athens Polytechnic uprising in November 1973, with her group being at the very origin of the revolt. Papadopoulou supported her partner's motion for the general assembly to vote in favor of continuing the occupation over the following days.

=== Fall of the dictatorship, pursuing her activities and publishing ===
Following the fall of the Greek junta, she founded the bookstore The Black Rose ('Μαύρο Ρόδο') with Konstantinidis. This name also gave birth to her nickname, 'The Black Rose'. Papadopoulou and Konstantinidis were responsible for the poster 'The cops sell the heroin', of which 12,000 copies were printed and distributed in 1978 during the crackdown on Greek squats, which were being accused of involvement in drug trafficking.

Despite Konstantinidis's death in 1992, Papadopoulou maintained The International Library publishing house until 2003, when she was evicted by the Greek state following a violent raid and on the grounds of an alleged debt of 935 euros. She continued publishing more intermittently until 2008; she was noted as being particularly poor during this period. According to Angelos Aslanidis, Papadopoulou was 'well-informed, lively, and full of energy, but constantly complaining about those who had abandoned the movement or those who sought to exploit it for personal gain'.

=== Death ===
She died on 24 April 2015 in Athens following a stroke and received a civil burial on the 27th at the Kaisariani Cemetery. The center-left newspaper Efimerida ton Syntakton described her as 'an iconic anarchist figure of the publishing world associated with the revival of the anarchist movement in Greece from 1972 onwards' in the obituary dedicated to her.

== Bibliography ==
- CEP (2026), "PAPADOPOULOU, Sylvia [dite "La Rose Noire"]", Dictionnaire international des militants anarchistes, Paris

As of this edit, this article uses content from "PAPADOPOULOU, Sylvia [dite “La Rose Noire”"], authored by CEP, which is licensed in a way that permits reuse under the Creative Commons Attribution-ShareAlike 3.0 Unported License, but not under the GFDL. All relevant terms must be followed.
