= Athens Polytechnic March of 1980 =

Demonstration in Greece

The Athens Polytechnic March 1980 was a demonstration held for the 7th anniversary of the Athens Polytechnic Uprising. During the demonstration serious clashes between the protestors and the riot police occurred, during which the "Units for the Reinstatement of Order (MAT)" killed two demonstrators and injured 150.

== The events ==
Every year on 17 November a demonstration for the Athens Polytechnic Uprising and in memory of the demonstrators killed during the uprising, takes place in Athens and other major Greek cities. In 1980, with Greece being about to rejoin NATO military exercises and with negotiations regarding American military camps in Greece going on, the government of Georgios Rallis and the police did not allow the march to pass as usually in front of the American embassy (the USA government had supported the military dictatorship).

The parliamentary left, consisting of KKE and PASOK, accepted the restriction changing the usual route and following a course to the Syntagma square where at about 19:30 it was dissolved. However, some organizations, mostly of the far-left, refused to accept the restrictions at about 21:00 about 2000-3000 demonstrators moved towards Vasilissis Sofias Avenue in order to reach the American Embassy. After a few minutes of quarrels the demonstrators passed through the first line of regular police. Behind this line there were several units of riot police that attacked the protestors. During the clashes that followed, the police used, for the first time after the dictatorship, guns and vehicles with mounted water canons against the protestors.

During these clashes two protestors were killed:

Stamatina Kanellopoulou, a worker aged 20, was brutally beaten and transferred to the Ippokrateio Hospital where she died before she was provided first aid. The forensic doctor's findings report 18 hits at the head, multiple fractures and severe head injury.

Iakovos Koumis, a Cypriot student aged 26, took part in the march and was beaten in Syntagma square while sitting at a nearby coffee shop.

About 150 more protesters were injured.

== Reactions of politicians ==
Most politicians did not condemn the police brutality. The government expressed its anger against "organized anarchist and extremist elements that stained the great commemoration of the people and brutally challenged the democratic and peaceful feelings of the Greek people" while the prime minister Georgios Rallis said that "Even Archangel Michael holds a sword to defend against demons. Not flowers." to defend the riot police. Papandreou and Florakis (leaders of PASOK and KKE respectively) only made comments about how the police should have acted so that the violent events would be avoided. Ioannis Zigdis of the Union of Democratic Center, stated that the reason for the tragic event was the government keeping active the MAT police force, which he considered worse than the military dictatorship's interrogating units and at the same level to the Nazi SS.

== Commemoration ==
The slogan "Κουμής, Κανελλοπούλου, Μιχάλης Καλτεζάς, Αλέξης Γρηγορόπουλος, αυτή είναι η ΕΛ.ΑΣ." (translating to "Koumis, Kanellopoulou, Michalis Kaltezas, Alexis Grigoropoulos, this is EL.AS" (ΕΛ.ΑΣ. stands for "Greek Police")) containing the names of the two victims in this demonstration, and of two other demonstrators killed by the Greek Police (Alexis Grigoropoulos and Michalis Kaltezas), is often chanted by demonstrators against police brutality. Sometimes other names of victims of the police are used in the chant, such as that of Nikos Sampanis (murdered in 2021).
