= Christ Recrucified (TV series) =

- Genre: Drama
- Written by: Nikos Kazantzakis (original), Notis Pergialis (adapted)
- Directed by: Vasilis Georgiadis
- Starring: Katia Dandoulaki, Andreas Filippidis, Alexis Golfis, Lykourgos Kallergis, Andreas Filippidis, Georgia Vasileiadou, Giorgos Fountas
- Country of origin: Greece
- Original language: Greek
- No. of seasons: 1
- No. of episodes: 18

Production
- Production locations: Athens, Greece
- Running time: 50 min

Original release
- Network: EIRT
- Release: 1975 – 1976

Christ Recrucified (Greek: Ο Χριστός Ξανασταυρώνεται; O Christos Xanastavronetai) is a Greek television series based on the homonymous novel of Nikos Kazantzakis. The series was aired in 1975 from the Hellenic Broadcasting Corporation. It was directed by Vasilis Georgiadis. The series stars the actors Katia Dandoulaki, Alexis Golfis, Lykourgos Kallergis, Andreas Filippidis, Georgia Vasileiadou, Giorgos Fountas and others. Alexis Golfis played the role of the Jesus Christ. Because he faced many troubles in his life and died relatively young, he associated with the curse of the actors who re-enacted the role of Christ in the cinema. Today an issue of a series consisted of 18 episodes of 50 minutes, is still saved.

== Plot ==
Somewhere in the interior of Anatolia during the Greco-Turkish War (1919-1922), Lykovrysi is a wealthy Greek village under Turkish rule. A local Ottoman governor rules the area collaborating with four senior Greek citizens: the rich landowner Patriarcheas, the stingy Geroladas who owns a general trade store, the priest papa-Grigoris, the teacher and the captain. As it is customary, once every seven years the Christians of the village choose certain villagers to re-enact the Passions of Christ during the Holy Week incarnating Biblical figures. At the end of Easter the Greek magistrates who govern the village gather to discuss the organisation of the feast of the following year. After some villagers are assigned their Biblical roles, survivors of a village burnt by the Turks arrive in Lykovrysi and plea with the rulers to be allowed to settle there. Priest Grigoris refuses to help them. The play, associated with the warring events, affects the lives of the people in this place.

== Cast ==
- Katia Dandoulaki
- Alexis Golfis
- Andreas Filippidis
- Lykourgos Kallergis
- Andreas Filippidis
- Georgia Vasileiadou
- Giorgos Fountas
- Nassos Kedrakas
- Dimos Starenios
