= Anna Reynolds =

Anna Reynolds may refer to:

- Anna Reynolds (writer), British novelist, playwright, and screenwriter
- Anna Reynolds (singer), English opera singer
- Anna Reynolds (mayor), Australian politician, lord mayor of Hobart
