= Katia Dandoulaki =

Greek actress

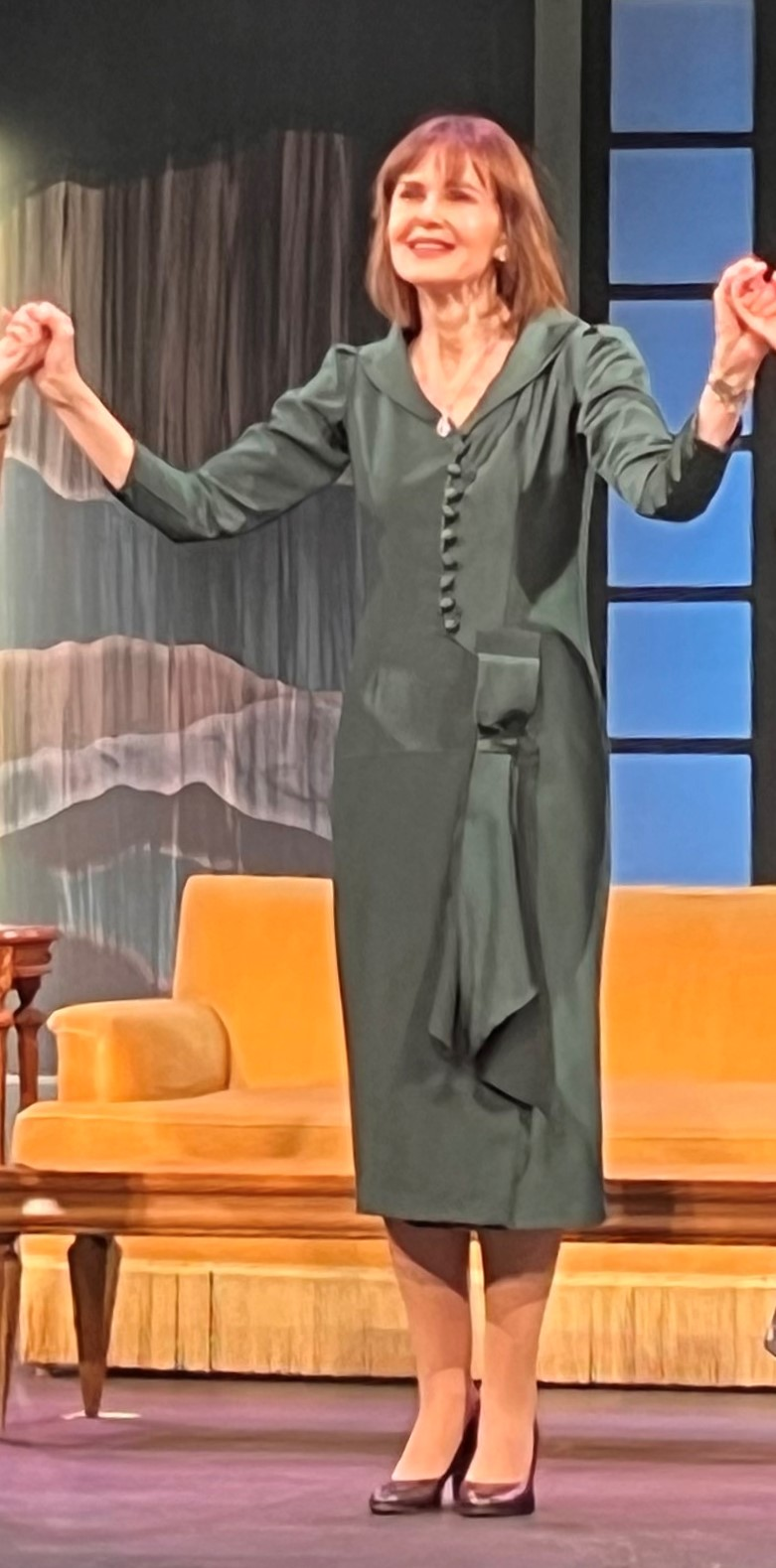
- Born: Ekaterini Dandoulaki; May 16, 1948 (age 78); Thessaloniki, Kingdom of Greece
- Education: London School of Dramatic Art
- Spouse: Marios Ploritis (1996–2006) (his death)

Ekaterini "Katia" Dandoulaki (Greek: Κάτια Δανδουλάκη; born May 16, 1948) is a Greek theatre, television and film actress. She is best known for her role as protagonist Virna Drakou on the Greek television series Lampsi in the 1990s. Katia also starred in the series I Zoi tis Allis, which surpassed 70% of the ratings and in Vals me 12 Theous in 2012 with at least 60% ratings on the Ant1 network. It was the 2012 record for the network.

== Biography ==
She was the spouse of the Greek intellectual, translator, writer Marios Ploritis, who translated many of her plays. They were in a relationship for 22 years and then married in 1996, which lasted until his death in 2006.

Dandoulaki studied at the Greek Art Theatre Karolos Koun and the London School of Dramatic Art.

== Career ==
Katia Dandoulaki starred in many popular Greek films, like Papaflessas (1971) with Dimitris Papamichael. She played the role of Marmo Panteou, a young wife, in the classic TV series Oi Pantheoi (1977), based on a classic novel by Tassos Athanassiadis. During the 1990s she starred as Virna Drakou in the popular Greek soap opera of Nikos Foskolos Lampsi.

She also played Maria Callas in Terrence McNally's Master Class, and Blanche in A Streetcar Named Desire. She was one of the lead stars in the TV series Istera irthan oi melisses (2000), directed by Yiannis Koutsomitis. It was one of the few successes that ET1, the state TV channel, had during that period. During the 2001-2002 season she played Emma in the classic Pinter play Betrayal. It was a big success, and directed by Stamatis Fasoulis. Her co-stars were S. Zalmas and K. Konstantopoulos.

Subsequently, she worked on Vera sto Dexi, as a main character, until 2007.

After Vera sto Dexi, a TV series from MEGA CHANNEL, she worked on the TV series I Zoi Tis Allis as main character airing at the same channel.

In 2019, she started acting in Agries Melisses a dramatic TV series from ANTENNA CHANNEL.

== Katia Dandoulaki Theatre ==
Katia Dandoulaki has a theatre named after her in Athens. The modern theatre of Katia Dandoulaki resulted from the remodelling of the third floor of a commercial complex of entertainment halls built in the 1960s. In particular, the 1000 m^{2} area of the Superstar Theatre was completely remodelled. It is a work by architect Katerina Thanou.

The theatre proper has 500 stalls on an inclined level and a stage 200 m^{2} with a revolving section which offered the possibility of multiple uses. The foyer, with an area of 250 m^{2}, is on two levels and includes a bar, bookshop, lounge and a small exhibition area in the loft.

== Theatrical filmography ==
=== 1966–1979 ===
- Madame sans-gene/ Victorien Sardou
- Irkutsk story/ Alexei Arbuzov
- The Little Foxes/ Lillian Helman
- Un Amour fou/ Andre Roussin
- I want to see Musov/ Marty Feldman
- Panoria/ George Hortatsis
- Life is a Dream/ Pedro Calderón de la Barca
- Miss Julie/ August Strindberg
- The School for Wives/ Jean Molière
- Poor Marik/ Alexei Arbuzov
- Private Lives/ Noël Coward
- Ring Rround the Moon/ Jean Anouilh

=== 1979–1985 ===
- Anna Karenina/ Leo Tolstoy
- Arms and the Man/ George Bernard Shaw
- It had to be you/ Renée Taylor & Josheph Bologna
- Ciao
- The Heiress/ Ruth & August Goetz
- Extrimities/ William Mastrosimone
- As You Desire Me/ Luigi Pirandello
- Anatol/ Arthur Snitchler
- Dream girl/ Elmer Rice
- To clothe the naked/ Luigi Pirandello
- Nan (Henceforward)/ Alan Ayckbourn
- Bell, book and candle/ John Van Druten
- The day after the fair/ Thomas Hardy (based on the novel "on the western circuit")
- The seagull/ Anton Chekhov (1993)
- Jordan / Anna Reynolds & Moira Buffini (1993)
- Creditors/ August Strindberg (1994)

=== 1995–present ===
- The Cherry Orchard/ Anton Chekhov (1995–1996)
- A servant of two masters/ Carlo Goldoni (1996–1997)
- Master Class/ Terrence McNally (1997–1998)
- A Streetcar Named Desire/ Tennessee Williams (1998–1999)
- Sauce for the Goose/ Georges Feydeau (1999–2000)
- Jordan/ Anna Reynolds & Moira Buffini (2000)
- It had to be you/ Renée Taylor & Josheph Bologna (2000–2001)
- Betrayal/ Harold Pinter (2001–02)
- Chapter Two/ Neil Simon (2002–2003)
- I'm staying near the restaurant: Late to get married, early to die/ Edvard Radzinski (2003–2004)
- Three Sisters/ Anton Chekhov (2004–2005)
- Witness for the Prosecution/ (2005–2006)

=== National Theatre of Greece Productions ===
- A Month in the Country / Ivan Turgenev (1984)
- Lysistrata/ Aristophanes (summer 1997)

== Television and film work ==
- "Agries Melisses" (2019–2021) TV series as Aneta "Anet" Sevastou
- "4xxx4" (2016–2017) TV series as Parthenia Ralli
- "Orkos Siopis" (2014-2015) TV series as Alexandra Aslani
- "To Spiti tis Emmas" (2013–2014) TV series as Ioulia Paxinou
- "Dancing With The Stars (2012–2015) - Judge
- "Vals me Dodeka Theous" (2012–2014) TV series
- "I Zoi tis Allis" (2009–2012) TV series as Katia Kallifatidi
- "Vera Sto Dexi" (2004–2007) TV series as Claire
- "Leni" (2003) TV series as Eleni
- "Istera irthan oi melisses" (2000) TV series as Despina
- "Lampsi, I" (1991–1998) TV series as Virna Drakou
- Sweet Country (1987) as Sister Mathilde
- "A.D." (1985) (mini) TV series as Octavia
- Greek Language and People (1983) BBC Greek learning series as herself
- Tragoudi tis epistrofis, To (1983)
- "Athlioi ton Athinon, Oi" (1980) TV series as Mariora
- "Pantheoi, Oi" (1977) TV series as Marmo Pantheou
- 1000 hronia prin (1977) (TV)
- Agnostos stratiotis (1976) as Myrto
- Sta dyktia tou tromou (1975)
- Daimonismeni, I (1975) as Eleni Stavrianou
- Gios mou, o Stefanos, O (1975) as Hristina
- "O Hristos xanastavronetai " (1975) TV series as Maryori
- "O Asterismos ton likon " (1974) TV series
- "Alithines istories" (1974) TV series
- Epikindini nychta (1974)
- Lesviakos Avgoustos (1974) as Angeliki
- Okei, file (1974)
- Sfalma (1974)
- Polemistai tis eirinis (1973)
- Sta diktia tis arahnis (1973)
- Boom, tara!!! Ta tzoum!!! (1972) as Lefkippi
- Ippokratis kai dimokratia (1972)
- Os tin teleftaia stygmi (1972)
- Souliotes (1972)
- Olokaftoma, To (1971)
- Megali stigmi tou '21: Papaflessas, I (1971)
