= Thieves in Black =

The Thieves in Black (Greek: ληστές με τα μαύρα) is a media-coined name given to a supposed anarchist group responsible for numerous bank robberies in Athens, Greece.

In 2005, suspects were taken into custody in connection with an anarchist firebombing in Athens, suspected by authorities of membership in the Thieves in Black. All three of them, after one and one-and-a-half years in prison, respectively, were found not guilty and released from prison.

In early 2006, following a shootout at the National Bank in central Athens, police injured and captured Yiannis Dimitrakis a suspected member of the Thieves in Black. He was alleged to be carrying two semi-automatic guns, hand grenades, and stolen cash.

== See also ==
- Anarchism in Greece
