= Scala case =

On 15 January 1978, a fire in Barcelona's Scala nightclub killed four people. The ensuing trial became known as the Scala case. Initially, some of the protestors were condemned to prison sentences, but after some years, it was revealed that the cause of the incident were the actions of an infiltrated police officer, who was finally condemned.

== The incident ==
In the morning of Sunday 15 January 1978, a demonstration organized by the anarcho-syndicalist trade union Confederación Nacional del Trabajo (CNT) took place in Barcelona. The protest was held to demonstrate against the Moncloa Pacts, which CNT considered to be harmful to the working class. Around 15,000 people participated in the protest. At around 13:15, after the protest had ended and the protestors were dispersing, a group of young adults instigated by an agent provocateur named Joaquín Gambín threw molotov coctails at the stone facade of the Scala nightclub. According to the police, this was the cause of the fire that destroyed the building and killed four workers – Ramón Egea, Juan López, Diego Montoro and Bernabé Bravo – three of whom were ironically affiliated with CNT, that happened to be in the club at that time.

Different speculations were made by the press about the causes and the perpetrators of the crime. Some attributed the crime to common murderers, others speculated that its cause was related with affairs regarding the business of the club and others implicated relationships of the perpetrators with the campaign in favor of the freedom of expression of the actor and director Albert Boadella (who was at the time brought to a court-martial for allegedly offending the army with one of his works). Finally on Tuesday 17 January, the police informed the press about the arrest of some suspects, who were members of the anarchist trade union CNT. The newspaper of the French CNT, stated that the ignition was the result of the actions of agents provocateurs that had infiltrated the protest before the incident.

It is believed that flammable or incendiary materials were placed inside the club before the manifestation, since it is very improbable that simple molotov cocktails thrown at the stone facade of the building could result in the burning of the whole building except, paradoxically, the facade. Additionally, the inform of the firefighters indicated that the fire started in another place of the club and probably originated from a flammable material of military origin.

== The trial ==
The trial of Scala case took place in December 1980. Some days before the start of the trial a key witness had died. The lawyers of the defense requested that the first deputy prime minister Rodolfo Martín Villa appeared to testify, but he did not. The position of the defense was that the police orchestrated the incident with the use of agents provocateurs to reduce CNT's popularity among the workers and to stop its growth in Catalonia. José Cuevas, Xavier Cañadas and Arturo Palma were sentenced to 17 years in prison as the perpetrators of involuntary homicide and for fabricating explosives. Luis Muñoz was sentenced to 2 years and 6 months in prison for collaboration in the crime and Rosa López was sentenced to 5 months in prison for concealment.

After some years, a confidential paper of the police that assigned to Joaquín Gambín the task of infiltrating the protestors, was discovered. He was the one who infiltrated CNT to cause the incident. The pressure from the press on the police combined with Gambín's absence from the trial caused suspicions about the role of the police in the incident and the true perpetrators of the crime. Finally, in the end of 1981 Gambín was arrested in Valencia after a shoot-out with the police. The Scala case would reopen.

The second trial for the Scala case, in December 1983, had only one accused: Joaquín Gambín. He was condemned to 7 years in prison for assisting at a demonstration with arms and for constructing explosives. Since then, CNT has always presented this as an insidious maneuver by the government to stop the growth of the anarchist union by the negative publicity that the union had received during the previous years, before the restoration of justice.

== See also ==
- Anarchism in Spain
- Marfin bank arson
- Piazza Fontana bombing
