= Case of Irianna V.L. =

2010s trials in Greece

The case of Irianna V.L. involves the 2013 arrest, trial, conviction, and subsequent reactions surrounding graduate student Irianna V.L.'s alleged involvement in the school shooting and ties with the Conspiracy of Fire Nuclei. V.L. was eventually found innocent after appealing her conviction. The case gained significant attention due to V.L. being found guilty based on an insufficient DNA sample. Additionally, the court's consideration of V.L.'s social connections and activities, such as a trip to Barcelona, a city known for its anarchist presence, sparked controversy. V.L.'s initial 13-year sentence was met with skepticism, as it appeared to undermine the principle of presumption of innocence.

== Case ==
In 2011, the Greek police surveilled a house of individuals with suspected links to the Conspiracy of Fire Nuclei. Irianna V.L. visited this house, as its residents were friends of her boyfriend. After a police raid, V.L. gave a testimony to Greek police and volunteered a DNA sample. In November 2011, arms were found in Polytechnic School of Athens containing a small DNA sample. In 2013, V.L. was arrested on the basis of the two samples matching. The sample was so small, however, that it was exhausted in the first examination of the DNA, leaving none left for cross-examination to validate the results. This was below the minimum viable legal threshold.

The mass of the DNA sample collected from the guns was lower than the required legal minimum. Because of false positive results in DNA matching, a 2008 European Ombudsman decision recommended that each sample be tested at least twice. In the sole tested sample, seven of 16 sequences matched.

V.L. was found guilty at trial, based on the DNA sampling, and sentenced to 13 years in prison. She was released after a court of appeals acquitted her in 2018.

The acceptance by the court of the DNA evidence has been widely criticized. Law philosophy professor Aristides Hatzis highlighted various police shortcomings regarding the DNA sampling, from collecting the sample to its interpretation, that should have led to the rejection of the DNA matching and a lack of conviction. Hatzis also claimed that V.L. was punished by the police and the court for having an affair and social relations with anarchists, a fundamental violation of the rule of law. Law professor Gregoris Kalfetzis also raised his concern on the handling and interpretation of the DNA sample and noticed parallels between V.L.'s case and the notorious Dreyfus affair, in which the judiciary decision was predetermined before the trial and the evidence was manipulated to fit the decision.

== See also ==
- Anarchism in Greece
- DNA profiling
