= Homecoming Song =

1983 film

- Directed by: Yannis Smaragdis
- Written by: Yannis Kakoulidis; Yannis Smaragdis
- Produced by: Yannis Smaragdis
- Starring: Stathis Giallelis
- Cinematography: Giorgos Arvanitis
- Release date: July 1983
- Running time: 95 minutes
- Country: Greece
- Language: Greek

Homecoming Song (Greek: Το Τραγούδι της Επιστροφής, translit. To tragoudi tis epistrofis) is a 1983 Greek drama film directed by Yannis Smaragdis. It was entered into the 13th Moscow International Film Festival.

== Cast ==
- Stathis Giallelis as Antonis Melissinos
- Katia Dandoulaki as Eleni
- Nikos Armaos
- Vina Asiki
- Kostas Basis
- Dimitris Dagas
- Yiota Festa
- Thodoris Gonis (as Thodoros Gonis)
- Anthi Gounari
