= Monetary crisis in Greece (1879) =

The monetary crisis in Greece in 1879 was the result of domestic conditions and directly affected the country's economy. As a consequence it had the deterioration of the living standard of the economically weaker sections of the population, social unrest with the outbreak of strikes, such as the Syros strike of 1879, and political instability.

Transactions in Greece at that time were mainly conducted in foreign currency (Ottoman lira, Russian ruble), while the drachma, where it was used, had been overvalued by 18%. However, the banks and the state ignored the overvaluation and operated on the basis of the actual (commercial) value of the coins. In February 1879 there was a devaluation in the market value of foreign currencies which reached 27%, lowering the equivalent of daily wages to the same percentage, while on the other hand the market continued to operate based on the real value of money. The purchasing power of the average population thus decreased, to a rate approaching 50%.
