= Marios Ploritis =

Greek journalist, translator and theatrologist (1919–2006)

- Μάριος Πλωρίτης
- Born: Marios Stylianos Papadopoulos; 19 January 1919; Piraeus, Kingdom of Greece
- Died: 29 December 2006 (aged 87); Athens, Greece
- Resting place: First Cemetery of Athens
- Citizenship: Greece
- Education: National and Kapodistrian University of Athens
- Occupations: Journalist; critic; director; writer; translator; academic
- Years active: 1942–2006
- Spouses: Ellie Lambeti (m. 1950; div. 1953) Marika Anemogianni (m. 1964; died 1995) Katia Dandoulaki (m. 1996)
- Partner: Aliki Vougiouklaki

Marios Ploritis (Greek: Μάριος Πλωρίτης; born Marios Stylianos Papadopoulos, Greek: Μάριος Στυλιανός Παπαδόπουλος; 19 January 1919 – 29 December 2006) was a Greek journalist, critic, director, writer, translator, and academic.

== Biography ==
Marios Ploritis was born on 19 January 1919, in Piraeus and held a degree in law, economics and political sciences from the University of Athens. He studied theater in England, France and the USA. He worked as a theater and cinema critic on the newspaper "Ελευθερία" (freedom) (1945-1965), theatrical director of the National Radio Foundation (1950-1952), theatrical history professor at the dramatic school of the Art Theater (1956-1967) and professor of the Vinsennes University of Paris. He was among the founders of the Art Theater, along with Karolos Koun. He directed nearly 20 theatrical plays in various athenian troupes, mostly between 1952 and 1962. Since 1971, he worked as a professor of theatrology in the University of Athens.

Ploritis' translational and critical work is very important. His weekly articles-epiphyllides on Vima tis Kyriakis and on various magazines bear a good reputation until today. He was the editor-in-chief of the newspaper I Niki (1965-1967) and from 1974 onwards. He was a member of Union of Editors of Daily Newspapers of Athens, of the Society of Playwrights, the Theatrical Critics Union, the Cinema Critics Union, the Hellenic Theatrical Center, the Center for the Treatment of Dependent Persons and other associations and organizations. Furthermore, Ploritis co-founded Ikaros editions along with Alekos Patsifas and Nikolaos Karidis.

Marios Ploritis had three marriages: One to actress Elli Lambeti in 1950 (they divorced in 1953), second to Marika Anemogianni in 1964 and third in 1996 to Katia Dandoulaki (with whom he was already a couple for many years, they lived together a total of 35 years, according to her words in an interview she gave). His companion was also the popular Greek actress, Aliki Vougiouklaki. He was a permanent resident of Athens and also spoke French, English, German and Italian.

Ploritis died at Henry Dunant Hospital Center, on 29 December 2006, at age 87.

== Author's work ==
Marios Ploritis wrote the following books:

- Faces of modern drama (1965, fourth edition 1978)
- Plumes and Traps (1966)
- The Masks (1967)
- Maximum Course (1975)
- Politics ΄B and ΄C (1980)
- Brecht and Hitler (1984)
- Art, Language and Power (1989)
- Of the stage and art (1990)
- New Politics A and B (1990)
- Mime and Mime (1990)
- Love of Freedom and Democracy (1992)

He also translated the following works: Rilke's Letters to a New Poet (1943), Brecht's Poems (1978) and about 120 plays by international authors.

== Recognition ==
- A stamp in the shape of Ploritis was issued in 2015 in the commemorative series of ELTA stamps "100 years since the foundation of ESIEA".

== Sources ==
- Dictionary of modern Greek literature: Persons - Works - Currents - Terms, published by Patakis, Athens 2007. Original title: Λεξικό νεοελληνικής λογοτεχνίας: Πρόσωπα - Έργα - Ρεύματα - Όροι, εκδ. Πατάκης, Αθήνα 2007
