= Athens Polytechnic uprising =

1973 student uprising against the Greek junta

- Εξέγερση του Πολυτεχνείου; Part of the Greek junta and the Cold War
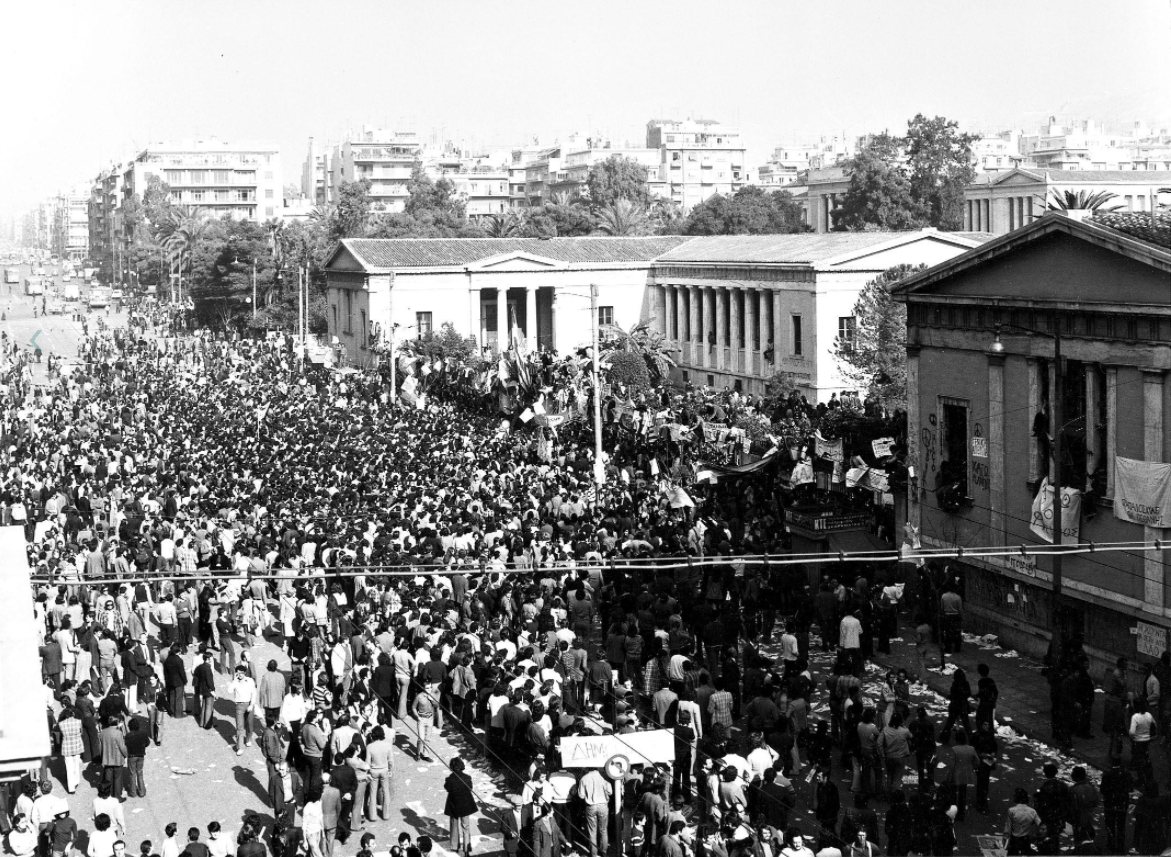
- Protesters outside the Athens Polytechnic on Patission Street
- Date: 14–17 November 1973
- Location: National Technical University of Athens; 37°59′16″N 23°43′54″E
- Caused by: Junta's authoritarianism
- Goals: Fall of the Junta
- Methods: Student protest
- Result: Uprising suppressed: Junta is preserved but weakened; Dozens of students murdered; International backlash; Attempts at liberalization by Georgios Papadopoulos, which results in another coup launched by hardliner Dimitrios Ioannidis; Founding of the far left terror organization 17N and revival of anarchism in Greece; Break between the Greek youth and traditional leftist parties until then (notably Communist ones)

Parties
Greek anarchists; PAK; Progressive All-Student Unionist Camp; AASPE; Greek students more broadly; ΕΚΟΝ Rigas Feraios (opposed first then joins on 15 November); Communist Youth of Greece (opposed first then joins on 15 November)	(Greece) Greek junta; Ministry of National Education and Religious Affairs; Ministry of Public Order; Cities Police; Hellenic Army

Lead figures
Christos Konstantinidis; Sylvia Papadopoulou; Maria Damanaki	(Greece) Georgios Papadopoulos (Greece) Spyros Markezinis (Greece) Panagiotis Sifnaios (Greece) Panagiotis Therapos (Greece) Nikolaos Dertilis

Casualties and losses
- 40 people killed by Greek Junta and 2,000 civilian wounded in Athens (executed)

Casualties
- Deaths: 40 (24 identified, 16 unidentified)
- Injuries: 2,000+ (1,103 verified)
- 40 people killed by Greek Junta and 2,000 civilian wounded in Athens (executed)

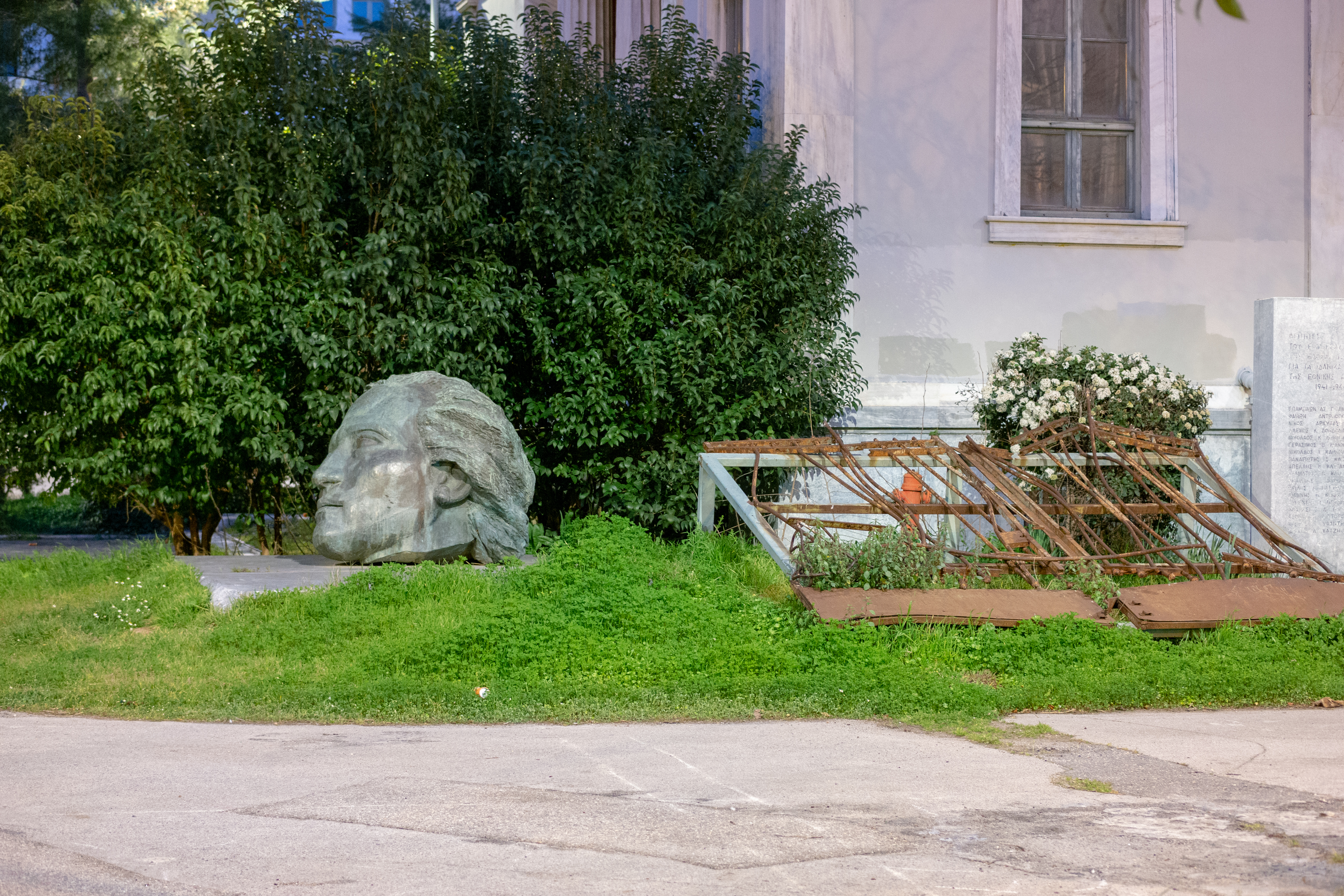
The old gate

The Athens Polytechnic uprising occurred in November 1973 as a massive student demonstration of popular rejection of the Greek military junta of 1967–1974. It began on 14 November 1973, escalated to an open anti-junta revolt, and ended in bloodshed in the early morning of 17 November after a series of events starting with a tank crashing through the gates of the Athens Polytechnic. According to a detailed 2004 research published by the National Hellenic Research Foundation, at least 26 people died on that day due to direct or indirect actions by the Greek army and police. This was the first event in a series of political crises that ultimately led to the fall of the junta in the summer of 1974, just a few months later.

The uprising had a lasting impact on Greek politics; it marked a break between the Greek youth and traditional leftist parties (KKE), and it also saw the beginning of the revival of anarchism in Greece. The repression faced by students gave rise to the urban guerrilla organization 17N.

== Background ==
The first massive public action against the Greek junta came from students on 21 February 1973, when law students and anarchists went on strike and barricaded themselves inside the buildings of the Law School of the University of Athens in the centre of Athens, demanding repeal of the law that imposed forcible conscription.

An anti-dictatorial student movement was growing among the youth, and the police utilised brutal methods and torture towards them, in order to confront the threat.

== November events ==
=== 14 November ===
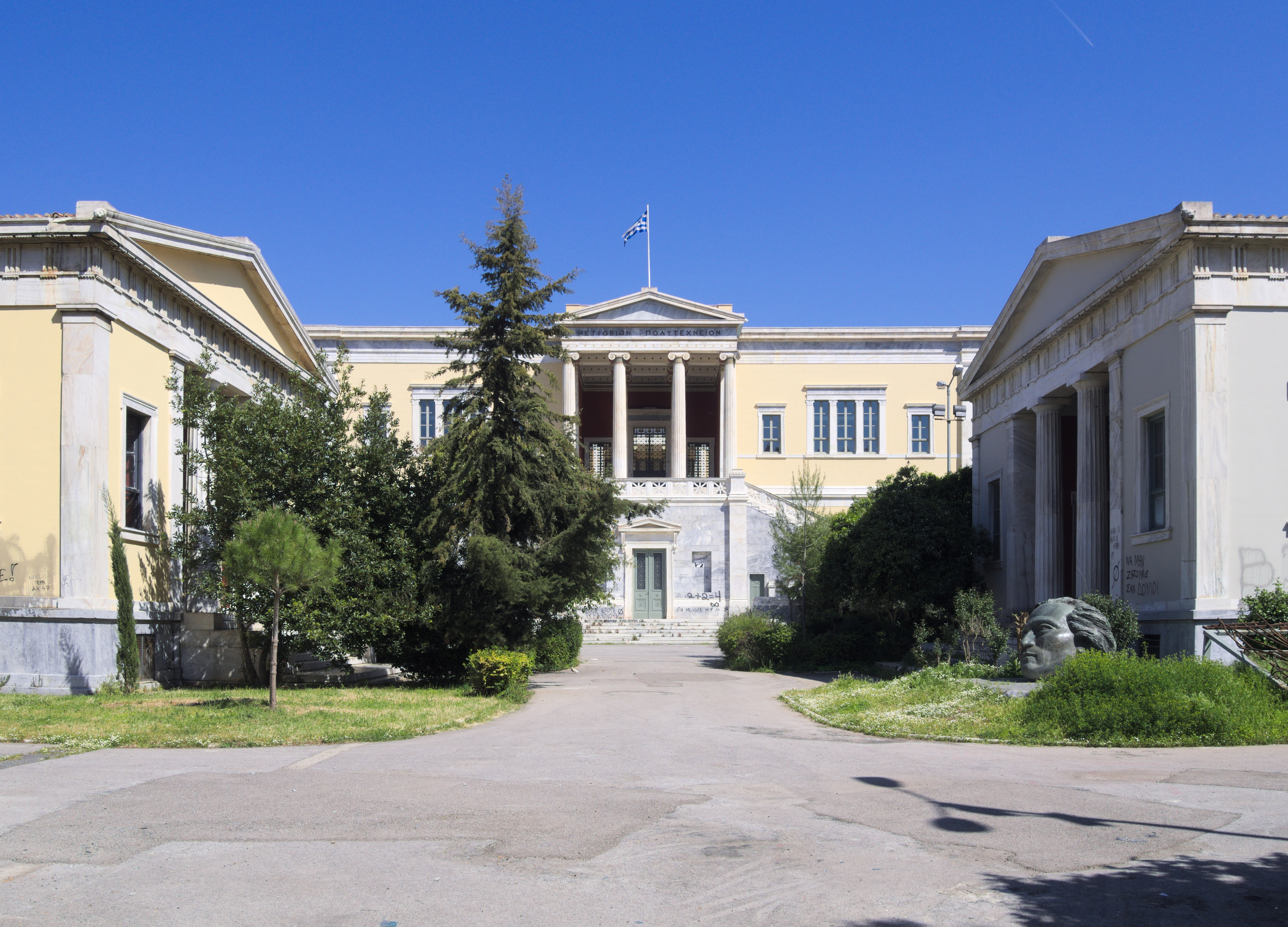
The entrance of the National Technical University of Athens

On 14 November 1973, students at the Athens Polytechnic (Polytechneion), radicalized by newly born Greek anarchist circles went on strike and started protesting against the military junta (Regime of the Colonels). As the authorities stood by, the students were calling themselves the "Free Besieged" (Greek: Ελεύθεροι Πολιορκημένοι, a reference to the poem by Greek poet Dionysios Solomos inspired by the Ottoman siege of Mesolonghi). Their main rallying cry was:

Bread-Education-Liberty!
(Psomí-Paideía-Elefthería)

An assembly formed spontaneously and decided to occupy the Polytechnic. The anarchist group that had just formed at the university, notably thanks to the actions of Christos Konstantinidis, Sylvia Papadopoulou and Nikos Balis, occupied a central place in this movement, Konstantinidis, in particular, succeeded in having the occupation extended into the night of the first day, which set the movement in motion for the long term. They adopted the following motion in the 14 November General Assembly:

The autonomous assembly of workers located in the premises of the Polytechnic School calls on workers to occupy places of production and to create factory and strike committees with the ultimate goal of establishing workers' councils. The minimum program of the workers' councils is the destruction of wage labor, the state, capitalism, and politics.

The anarchist group leading the uprising quickly tagged the university and placed their banner at the entrance, until it was removed by communist militants who did not support the movement.

In contrast, two main student parties, the Marxist pro-Soviet A-EFEE and Rigas, did not endorse the movement. A Coordination Commission of the Occupation (CCO) was formed but had loose control over the uprising. Anarchists were labeled as provocateurs by the Communist Youth of Greece because they voiced slogans that were not directly tied to the students' demands (such as advocating for sexual freedom, social revolution, and the dismantling of the State). The connection to the French 1968 movement was evident. Historian Kostas Kornetis, reviewing the inter-leftist dynamics at play during the uprising and the lack of support by the Communist parties, noted:

The occupation largely bypassed the two main left-wing student organizations, and therefore there was no effective control of the direction that it took or of the students’ demands for the first day and a half. The occupation was not within the scope of the leadership of the pro-Moscow communists, which considered it 'an irresponsible and hasty move of an intense leftist character'. In fact, A-EFEE distanced itself from the venture from the very beginning, as it disliked unorganized action, which could get out of hand. [...] Rigas more or less shared this attitude, although without expressing a clear-cut position, as it was not ready for such an eventuality.

Police had gathered outside but did not manage to break into the premises.

=== 15 November ===
The Communist parties, having seen the success of the revolt, attempted to take control of it. They established a committee that excluded the anarchists and threw them out of the buildings, preventing them from entering, in order to seize control of the uprising. They were also in conflict with the anarchists because they did not appreciate their intersectional slogans, which called for sexual liberation, feminist slogans, or the abolition of the State, setting up patrol groups to remove them.

During the second day of the occupation (often called "celebration day"), thousands of people from Athens poured in to support the students. A radio transmitter was set up using laboratory equipment, enabling the occupations to run a pirate radio station, over which they ran broadcasts with requests for solidarity and aid. Thanks to this, the uprising gained greater support; one of the key figures driving this change was Maria Damanaki, who was the main radio announcer for the A-EFEE and succeeded in popularizing the slogan: 'Bread - Education - Freedom'.

The demands of the occupation were anti-imperialistic and anti-NATO. Third parties that allied themselves with the student protests were the construction workers (who set up a parallel committee next to CCO) and some farmers from Megara, who coincidentally protested on the same days in Athens.

=== 16 November ===
On Friday, 16 November, the CCO proclaimed that the students were aiming to bring down the junta. During the afternoon, demonstrations and attacks against neighbouring ministries took place. Central roads were closed, fires erupted and Molotov cocktails were thrown for the first time in Athens. Students barricaded themselves in and that repeatedly broadcast across Athens:

Polytechneion here! Polytechneion here! People of Greece, the Polytechneion is the flag bearer of our struggle and your struggle, our common struggle against the dictatorship and for democracy!"

=== 17 November ===
In the early hours of November 17, 1973, the transitional government sent an AMX-30 tank crashing through the gates of the Athens Polytechnic. Soon after that, Spyros Markezinis had the task of requesting Georgios Papadopoulos to reimpose martial law. The subsequent influx of troops would facilitate the already planned Ioannides' coup that followed on the 25th.

An official investigation undertaken after the fall of the junta declared that no students of the Athens Polytechnic were killed during the incident. However, 24 civilians were killed outside the campus. These included 19-year-old Michael Mirogiannis, reportedly shot to death by officer Nikolaos Dertilis, high-school students Diomedes Komnenos and Alexandros Spartidis of Lycée Léonin, and a five-year-old boy caught in the crossfire in the suburb of Zografou. The records of the trials held following the collapse of the junta document the deaths of many civilians during the uprising, and although the number of dead has not been contested by historical research, it remains a subject of political controversy. In addition, hundreds of civilians were injured during the events.

== Legacy ==
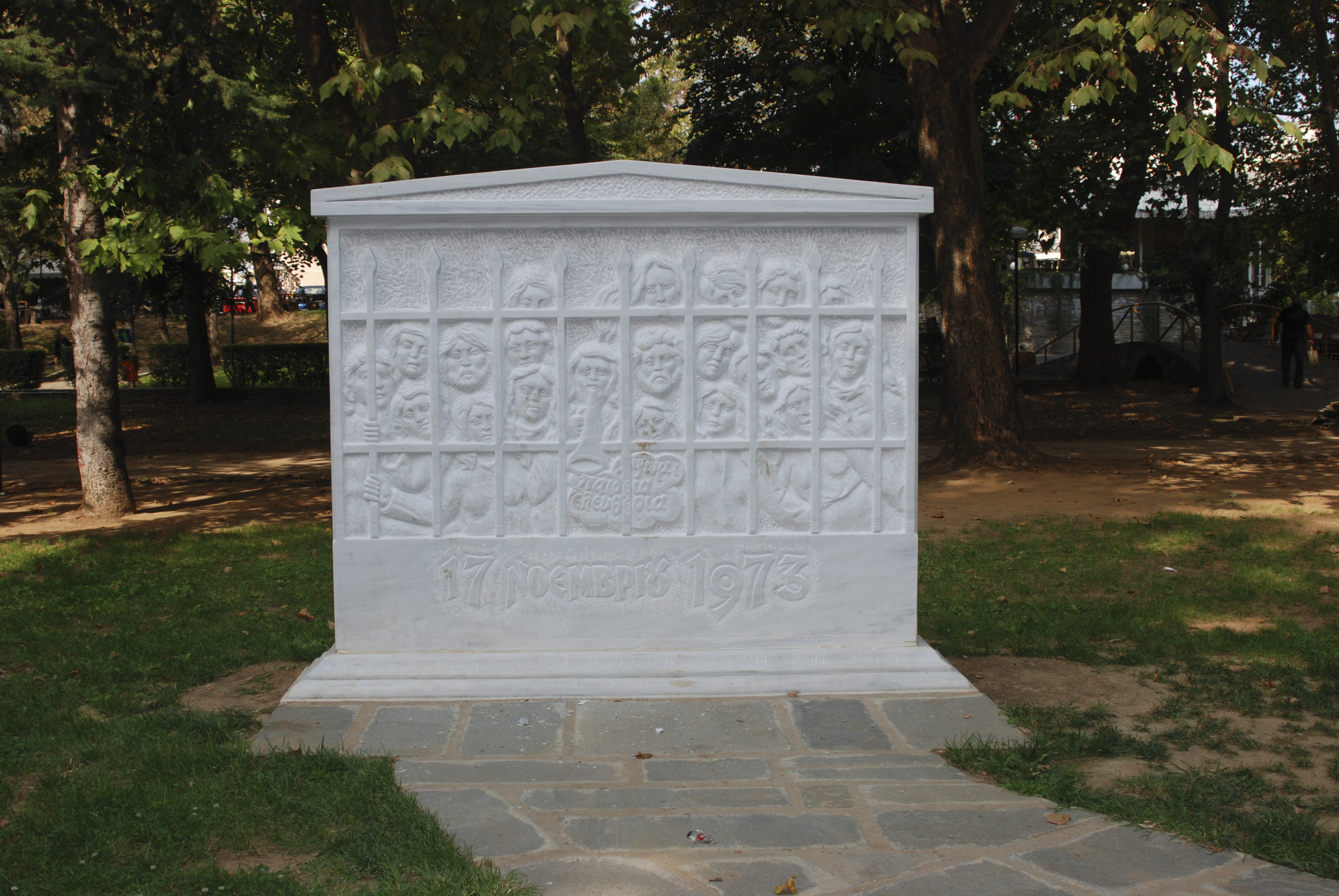
A sculpture commemorating the uprising

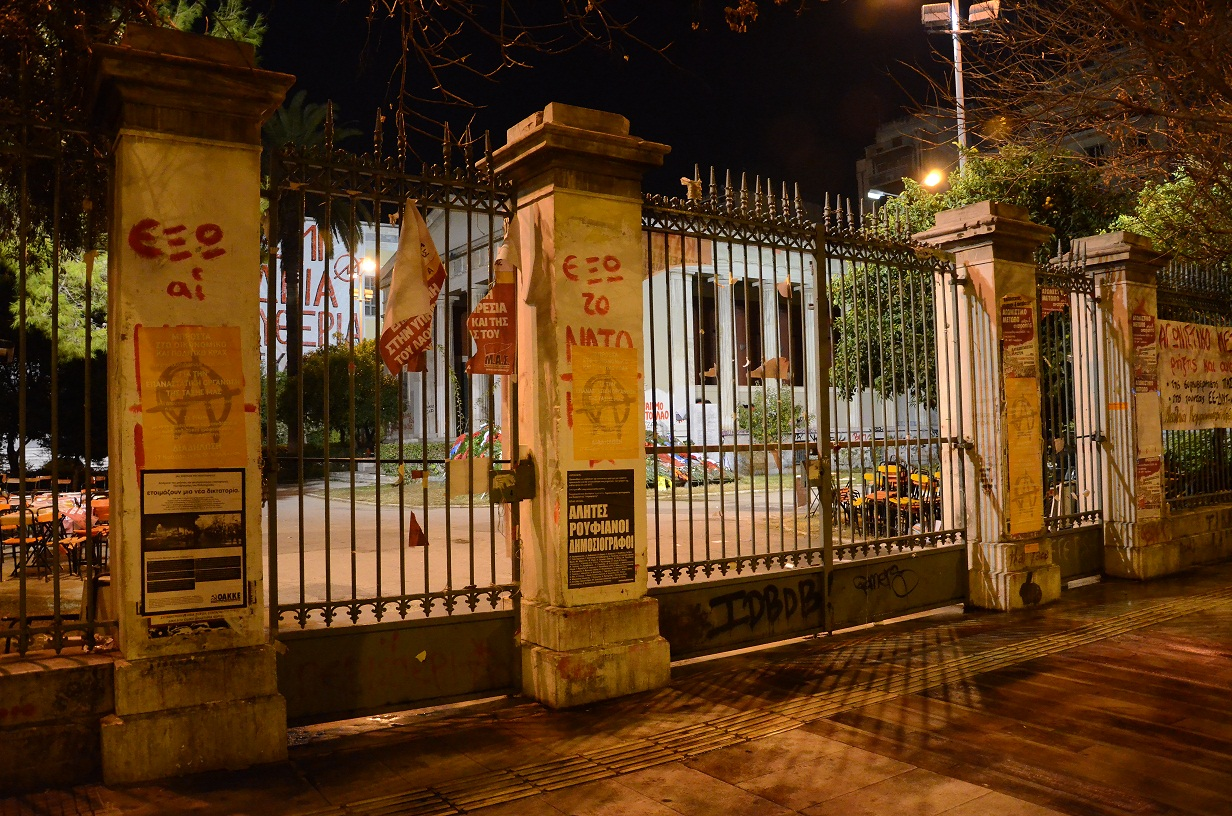
Gate of the Polytechnic, 17 November 2011

=== 17N and revival of anarchism in Greece ===
An annual march commemorates the uprising, starting near the grounds of the Polytechnic. In 1980, the police killed two people in an attempt to prevent marchers from passing by the American embassy in Athens, the traditional end point of the march in protest to the CIA's role in supporting the coup. The now-defunct far-left organization Revolutionary Organization 17 November, named after the last day of the Polytechnic uprising. After the transition to democracy, the group's chief hitman, Dimitris Koufontinas, attempted to assassinate figures associated with the junta, also titling his memoir-manifesto "I Was Born November 17th" (Γεννήθηκα 17 Νοέμβρη).

The students' struggle had a lasting effect on Greek anarchism. This event marked the revival of anarchism in Greece and democratized anarchist positions within the country.

It also marked a break between the Greek youth and the traditional leftist parties of the time, such as the Communist Party of Greece (KKE). In 2008, Damanaki, who had herself been one of the leading communist figures of the uprising before leaving the KKE twenty years later, in 1991, argued that the revolt was inspired by May '68 in its desire to break authoritarianism and that it had the same dynamics of the Communist party being opposed to it. She stated:

Many refer to the Polytechnic of 1973 as the Greek May '68. Certainly, there was an influence. It was the seed of doubt and opposition to the authoritarianism of power. In addition, there was the same animosity by the party establishment towards an uprising they could not control.

=== Early exaggerations and denialism ===
Following the fall of the Dictatorship in 1974, the subject of the Polytechnic's casualties became a matter of great controversy and rumors, with estimations ranging from 60 to 500. Some, like Loukas Apostolides (claimed 60; later a PASOK MP) and Mpampis Georgoulas (claimed between 77 and 423), would publish their estimations, whilst others would claim to the authorities and/or the press, similarly unfounded figures; an ex-KYP agent, Dimitrios Pimpas, would go as far as to claim that the total number was 450, and that they had been secretly interred near the cemetery of Zografou, prompting excavations in the area.

Despite the moderate but substantiated findings of Prosecutors Tsevas (18 officially or definitively confirmed dead and 16 unidentified persons “reasonably presumed dead”), Zagkinis (23-24 deaths) and Cities Police's Police Director Sampanis (12, but limited "to the immediate vicinity"), rumors of mass casualties persisted. Added to these was the very popular claim that “the tank ran over students” who were supposedly standing behind the gate.

==== The Ilenia hoax ====
Around the time of the first anniversary of the Polytechnic uprising, a sketch depicting a young girl was widely circulated with the caption: “Her name is Ilenia (Ηλένια). What happened to her?” The sketch was presented by a young man as a heroine of the uprising who had fallen victim to the events, deeply moving the nation. However, the girl in the sketch was not a Greek student, but a model from New Zealand, Nancy Cridland, from an advertising campaign for Breck Shampoo that had been published in magazines. The hoax was quickly exposed and the creator of this story, Giannis Iliopoulos, was identified and sentenced in February 1975 to eight months in prison. This incident was the first tangible case of fraud, which allowed the dictatorship apologists to speak of a myth.

These exaggerations led to the creation of a counter-narrative that refers to the "myth of the Polytechnic" and is based on the absence of confirmed deaths within the campus and the geographical dispersion of the victims of the suppression of the uprising (claiming that "no one died inside the Polytechnic"), highlighting also the incompleteness of speculative -but then popular- lists (e.g., Georgoulas') which often suffered from name corruptions or, in certain cases, contained only surnames.

The definitive clarity on the casualties was provided decades later by the research of Leonidas Kallivretakis, a senior researcher at the National Hellenic Research Foundation. Initiated in 1993, the systematically documented study managed to fully identify 24 individuals who were killed as a direct result of the suppression of the uprising. The subject however remains extremely polarising in political discourse, in conjunction with the political myth that emerged in the following decades and the established celebration.

== See also ==
- Greek junta trials
- Athens Polytechnic March of 1980
- White Terror (Greece)
- Greek Civil War

== Sources ==
- Glimenakis, Andreas Anthony (2011), Anarchy in the Cradle of Democracy (PDF), Lancaster, Pennsylvania: Franklin & Marshall College
- Καλλιβρετάκης, Λεωνίδας (2004). "Πολυτεχνείο '73: Το ζήτημα των θυμάτων: Νεκροί και τραυματίες" [Polytechnic School '73: The question of the victims: dead and injured]. Πολυτεχνείο '73: ρεπορτάζ με την Ιστορία (in Greek). Vol. 2. pp. 38–55. hdl:10442/8782.
- Kornetis, Kostis (2013). Children of the Dictatorship: Student Resistance, Cultural Politics and the 'Long 1960s' in Greece. Berghahn Books. ISBN 978-1-78238-001-6.
- Lekea, Ioanne K. (2014). 17N's Philosophy of Terror: An Analysis of the 17 November Revolutionary Organization. ABC-CLIO. ISBN 978-0-313-38141-6.
