= Marfin bank arson =

2010 Firebomb attack in Athens

Coordinates: 37°58′44.77″N 23°43′55.96″E

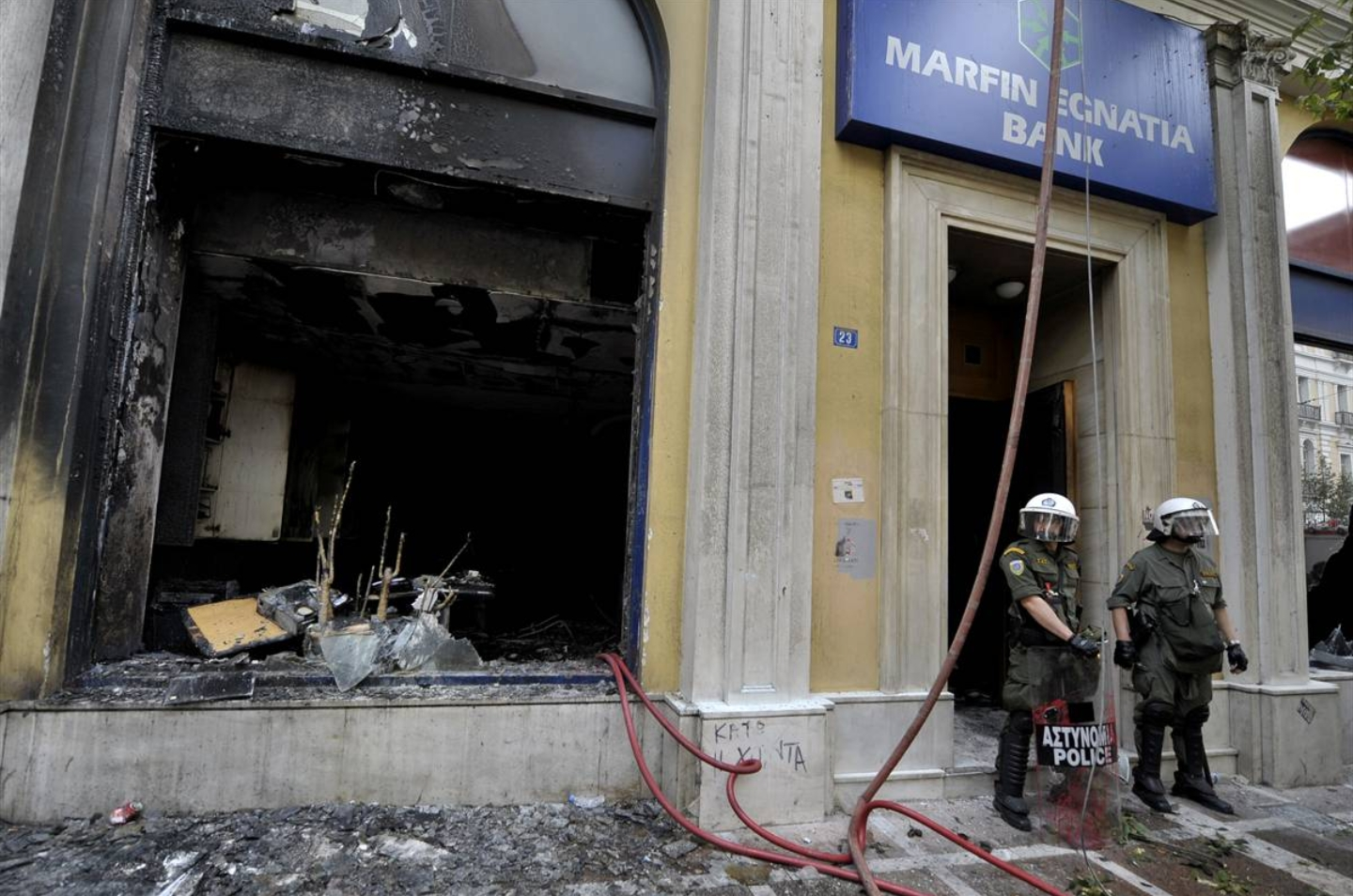
Marfin bank branch burned during protest in Greece, May 2010.

The arson of a branch of the Marfin-Egnatia bank in Athens took place on May 5, 2010, during anti-austerity demonstrations. A group of unidentified perpetrators threw molotov cocktails to the bank while 25–30 clerks were inside. Most of the employees managed to escape from the building or they were rescued by firefighters. However 3 people were trapped inside the building and died from asphyxia. In 2013, bank officials were convicted for the negligent homicide of three employees, the bodily harm of another 21 employees, and multiple failures in fire safety measures and staff training.

== The events ==
May 5, 2010, was declared a day of general strike and march to the Parliament by major Greek trade unions. A few days earlier, the government of George Papandreou had announced strict economic austerity measures in the context of dealing with the Greek government debt crisis. The demonstration in Athens was one of the largest recorded in Greece in its recent history, with the number of protesters estimated between 200,000 and 250,000.

While the main march of the demonstrators was heading towards Syntagma Square through Stadiou Street, at around 14:05 a group of hooded protesters attacked the Marfin building located at 23 Stadiou Street by breaking windows and throwing Molotov cocktails. There was a mixed reaction from those gathered outside at the time, some encouraging them while others urged them to stop. Soon heavy smoke enveloped the entire building. Most of the employees piled into the small skylight that communicated via mesh with the roof, which one of them managed to break. They then climbed from the skylight to the roof, from where they jumped into a neighboring building, breaking its glass with a piece of wood.

Angeliki Papathanasopoulou, 32 years old (and 4 months pregnant), Epameinondas Tsakalis, 36 years old and Paraskevi Zoulia, 35 years old, were found dead. They were trapped by the flames on the third floor of the building and died of suffocation as a result. According to the medical examiner "The smoke and toxic gases from burning the plastics and stationery killed them almost immediately. They lost consciousness and shortly after died." When they were found their mouths were open and their faces were black with smoke.

Some hooded groups, moving parallel to the main march, had also attacked a bookshop of the Ianos book chain located opposite the bank (Stadiou 24).

== Reactions ==
The event became known quickly throughout Greece and was condemned by the political parties. KKE characterized it as "a crime aimed at terrorizing the people and slandering the struggle for the overthrow of the barbaric measures and anti-people policy". Anarchist groups condemned the event, while the terrorist organization Conspiracy of Fire Nuclei called the event a "collateral damage". Marfin Bank's president Andreas Vgenopoulos was booed by the crowd when he arrived at the place of the tragedy. Employees of the bank and families of the victims moved legally against the management and the ownership for inadequate protection measures.

Participation in anti-austerity protests was reduced following the Marfin arson, while the anarchist movement faced a period of isolation after the press attempted to present the (yet unidentified) culprit as belonging to the anarchist ideology.

== Judicial processes ==
Following the attack, an anarchist suspect was brought to trial for intentional homicide, while two other unidentified persons were accused as perpetrators of the arson. The trial ended with the accused being judged innocent in the absence of sufficient evidence. Eye witnesses testified that the arson was carried out by a structured, organized group of people with a hierarchy and a leader. Testimonies include that the group was not comprised by the "usual people that go to protests" and that the person who lighted the fire threw a "probably new" material inside the bank that "caught fire immediately". Firefighters testified that some protestors tried to stop them, but that generally the majority of the crowd tried to help them reach the burning building.

In another trial that ended in July 2013, Marfin's CEO, the building's security officer and the store's manager were found guilty of the negligent homicide of three employees, the bodily harm of 21 other employees, and multiple lapses in fire safety measures and training of the staff. The bank's management had given the employees the instruction to work despite the general strike and the (likely to be violent) protest nearby.

In July 2026, two suspects were arrested in Athens after an anonymous email tip-off. A third suspect living in the United Kingdom was also being sought.

== See also ==
- Scala case
- 1990–1991 student protests in Greece
