= Lykourgos Kallergis =

Greek actor, director, and politician

Member of Hellenic Parliament for Athens A
- In office 20 November 1977 – 18 October 1981

Personal details
- Born: 7 March 1914 Choumeri, Kingdom of Greece
- Died: 27 August 2011 (aged 97) Athens General State Hospital "Georgios Gennimatas", Athens, Greece
- Party: Communist Party of Greece
- Spouses: Maria Foka (m. 1944, divorced); Jenny Kollarou (m. 1972)
- Children: 2
- Parent: Stavros Kallergis
- Relatives: Dimitrios Kallergis (relative)
- Occupation: Actor; director; politician

Lykourgos Kallergis (Greek: Λυκούργος Καλλέργης; 7 March 1914 – 27 August 2011) was a Greek actor, director and politician.

== Life ==
Kallergis was born on 7 March 1914 in Choumeri, on the island of Crete, to his father, Stavros Kallergis. He moved to Athens at age 10. Kallergis was married twice, to Jenny Kollarou and Maria Foka (I).

Kallergis was credited in more than five hundred acting roles in Greek television, film, radio and stage over a career that spanned more than sixty years. He also ventured into politics, serving as a deputy within the Greek Communist Party from 1977 until 1981. Kallergis later translated foreign language plays into Greek and worked as a director.

Kallergis died at Athens General State Hospital "Georgios Gennimatas" on 27 August 2011, at age 97.
