= Pavlos Argyriadis =

Greek anarchist (1849-1901)

- Παύλος Αργυριάδης
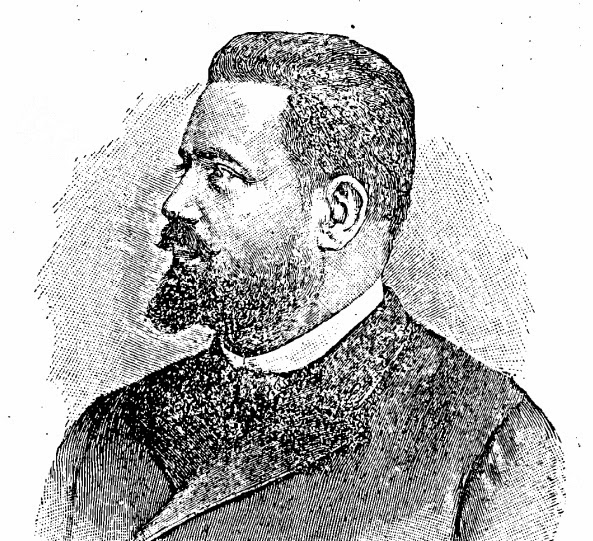
- Born: Panagiotis Argyriadis (Παναγιώτης Αργυριάδης); 14 August 1849; Kastoria
- Died: 19 November 1901 (aged 52); Paris
- Occupations: Journalist; Lawyer
- Movement: Anarchism, Socialism
- Spouse: Louise Napolier

Pavlos Argyriadis (birth name: Panagiotis Argyriadis, 14 August 1849, Kastoria - 19 November 1901, Paris) was a Greek lawyer, journalist and anarchist and socialist intellectual who was active in France during the late 19th century.

== Biography ==
He was born in Kastoria, Ottoman Empire in 1849, probably in a wealthy family. He completed his high school studies in Constantinople and then studied law in Paris, where he became a lawyer after becoming a French citizen. Argyriadis was one of the few Greek internationalists of that time who had a notable connection or participation in important revolutionary events in Europe including the Paris Commune in 1871. In Paris he defended accused workers and journalists. Among others, he had political relations with Platon Drakoulis and Stavros Kallergis. In 1889 he was a member of the Central Committee of the Socialist Revolutionary Party of France.

== Publications ==
His works include the following brochures:

- Concentration capitaliste, trusts et accaparements. Paris: edition of the periodical La Question sociale, 1896. Off print from Almanach de la Question sociale of 1896
- Solution de la Question d'Orient. La Confédération balkanique, compte rendu de la conférence tenue au Grand-Orient de France sur cette question et la Macédoine, relation sur ce pays (together with P. Lagarde). Paris: edition of the periodical La Question sociale, 1896. Off print from Almanach de la Question sociale of 1896
- Une cause célèbre. Affaire Souhain. Une mère qui, poussée par la misère étrangle ses enfants. Plaidorie. Paris: edition of the periodical La Question sociale, 1895
- La crise du socialisme en Allemagne. Paris, 1891
- La femme et le socialisme, traduction analytique de l'ouvrage de Bebel. Paris: edition of the periodical La Question sociale (firstly published in the periodical La Revue socialiste in 1889)
- Essai sur le socialisme scientifique: critique économique de la production capitaliste. Paris: edition of the periodical La Question sociale, 1890
- Le poète socialiste Eugène Pottier, ancien membre de la Commune. Paris: edition of the periodical La Question sociale, 1888
- La peine de mort, considérée aux point de vue philosophique, moral, légal et pratique chez Leroux. Paris, 1875, and several articles in the periodicals La Question sociale, Almanach de la Question sociale et de la libre penseé, La Revue socialiste.
