= Christos Konstantinidis (anarchist) =

Greek publisher, translator, and anarchist activist

- Χρήστος Κωνσταντινίδης
- Born: 1945
- Occupation: Editor, anarchist

Christos Konstantinidis (in Greek: Χρήστος Κωνσταντινίδης), born in 1945, is a Greek publisher, translator, and anarchist activist. He actively participated in radicalizing Athenian universities during the Greek junta (1967–1974) and was particularly involved in the Athens Polytechnic uprising (1973), an event that marked the beginning of the fall of the junta.

He is generally regarded as one of the first links between the Greek student movement and anarchism, and he holds an important place in the revival of anarchism in Greece.

== Biography ==
Christos Konstantinidis was born in 1945. He became politically active during the Greek junta (1967–1974) after being trained in activism in Paris. In 1971, he founded the International Library (Διεθνής Βιβλιοθήκη), which quickly became the gathering place for the Athenian anarchist and anti-authoritarian movement. Through his bookstore, he managed to circulate texts by Goldman, Bakunin, Kropotkin, as well as more recent works, including situationist texts. Guy Debord's The Society of the Spectacle (1967) is one of the books he helped to transmit clandestinely, according to several testimonies collected by Nicholas Apoifis, with witnesses often referring to this book.

With Nikos Balis, he participated in radicalizing students. Quickly, within this emerging circle of anarchists, he founded the first anarchist group within Greek universities. In February 1973, he initiated the occupation of the Faculty of Law at the University of Athens.

He played a central role during the Athens Polytechnic uprising, particularly by facilitating the publication of leaflets and materials for the movement. He participated in and encouraged the central action of the uprising by occupying the Faculty of Athens with his group on 14 November 1973, and strongly supported the idea that the occupation should be sustained over time, which was ultimately adopted. During this General Assembly, he had the following motion passed with his group:

The autonomous assembly of workers located in the premises of the Polytechnic School calls on workers to occupy places of production and to create factory and strike committees with the ultimate goal of establishing workers' councils. The minimum program of the workers' councils is the destruction of wage labor, the state, capitalism, and politics.

With his companions, he also tagged the university with slogans such as "Down with the State!", "Patriots are assholes!", and "Down with wage labor!" The group's banner, which read "Down with the State! Down with Capital! Down with Authority!" occupied the entrance of the Athens Polytechnic during the first days of the occupation, until communist militants removed it and the tanks of the dictatorship forcibly entered the university grounds. He then went into hiding, as he was actively sought by the police, but was arrested after three months on the run. He was then imprisoned without charges for ten days.

Konstantinidis opposed attempts to politically use the movement, particularly by the Communist Party of Greece (KKE). After the fall of the junta and the progression of the Metapolitefsi, that is to say, the transition of Greece to a liberal democracy, he was arrested again. He was arrested and then acquitted for allegedly attacking the police outside the courthouse where Rolf Pohle, a member of the Red Army Faction (RAF), was having his extradition to Germany granted by the Greek state. He was also arrested in 1977 on other charges, along with six other people who were found and beaten by the police at his home, but Konstantinidis was once again acquitted.

In 1975, he also published and translated anti-communist anarchist literature, such as Listen, Marxist! by Murray Bookchin. Later, the publisher took on the responsibility of publishing the Greek anarchist newspaper Pezodromio with Balis. Konstantinidis later managed the anarchist bookstore The Black Rose (Μαύρο Ρόδο).

== Legacy ==
Konstantinidis is one of the prominent figures in the Greek anarchist movement of the late 20th century; he is frequently mentioned in testimonies regarding these circles. An activist in the 1970s, he is generally regarded as one of the first links between the Greek student movement and anarchism, and he holds an important place in the revival of anarchism in Greece.
