= Athens General State Hospital "Georgios Gennimatas" =

Athens General State Hospital "Georgios Gennimatas" Γενικό Κρατικό Νοσοκομείο Αθηνών «Γεώργιος Γεννηματάς»

Geography
- Location: Athens, Attica, Greece
- Coordinates: 37.997°N 23.784°E

Organisation
- Care system: Publicly funded health care
- Type: Clinical

Services
- Emergency department: Yes

History
- Opened: 1958; 67 years ago

Links
- Website: https://www.gna-gennimatas.gr/
- Lists: Hospitals in Greece

The Athens General State Hospital "Georgios Gennimatas" founded in 1958 under the name Uniform General Hospital of Athens is a Greek nursing institution based in Athens at 154 Mesogeion Avenue.

== Background ==
In 1995 it was given as an additional title the name of the late minister of the PASOK governments during the 80s and 90s, Georgios Gennimatas. The hospital also connected its presence in modern Greek history with two important, political events, such as the treatment of many wounded people on the night of the suppression of the Polytechnic uprising (in the early hours of November 17, 1973) and the illness of the Greek Prime Minister Andreas Papandreou in the summer of 1988, when crowds of PASOK supporters gathered around him, in order to find out about the progress of his health.
