= Assassination of Michalis Kaltezas =

1985 murder of 15-year-old Greek protester

Michalis Kaltezas (Greek: Μιχάλης Καλτεζάς; 19 June 1970 – 17 November 1985) was a 15-year-old Greek protester who was shot at the back of his head by police officer Athanasios Melistas during the annual 17 November protests. After his death, violent protests and the occupations of the Chemistry School and the Athens Polytechnic followed. This event was part of the far-left disillusionment of Andreas Papandreou's failure to fulfill his campaign promises (unemployment was rapidly rising), leading the youth to violence against the 'establishment.' The police officer was sentenced to two years imprisonment, but he appealed and was declared innocent. Melistas' defense lawyer was Alexandros Lykourezos; the plaintiff attorneys were Nikos Konstantopoulos and Fotis Kouvelis.

On 26 November 1985, Leftist terrorist organization 17 November attacked a police van to avenge the death of Kaltezas; the attack resulted in the death of a police officer. In the attack of the 17 November's communiqué stated that Papandreou is "now working for the Right, which explains why it has yet to be overthrown."

== Sources ==
- Vradis, Antonis; Dalakoglou, Dimitris (2011). Revolt and Crisis in Greece, Between a Present Yet to Pass and a Future Still to Come. London: AK Press and Occupied London. ISBN 9780983059714.
- "Μιχάλης Καλτεζάς: Οταν από σφαίρα αστυνομικού χάθηκε ακόμη ένα παιδί". Ta Nea (in Greek). 6 December 2019.
- "Τα χτυπήματα της «17 Νοέμβρη» Νο 6-10" (in Greek). Το Βήμα. 28 July 2002. Archived from the original on 2017-01-28.
- "ΚΑΤΑΣΤΟΛΗ ΚΑΙ ΜΕΤΑΠΟΛΙΤΕΥΣΗ: Οι αόρατοι νεκροί της δημοκρατίας" (in Greek).
- "Η 12η επέτειος του «Πολυτεχνείου» και η δολοφονία Καλτεζά". Σαν Σήμερα.
- Kassimeris, G. (2007). "For a place in history: Explaining Greece's revolutionary organization 17 November" (PDF). Journal of Conflict Studies. 27 (2): 129–145.
