= Conspiracy of Fire Nuclei =

Greek anarchist militant organization

- Συνωμοσία των Πυρήνων της Φωτιάς
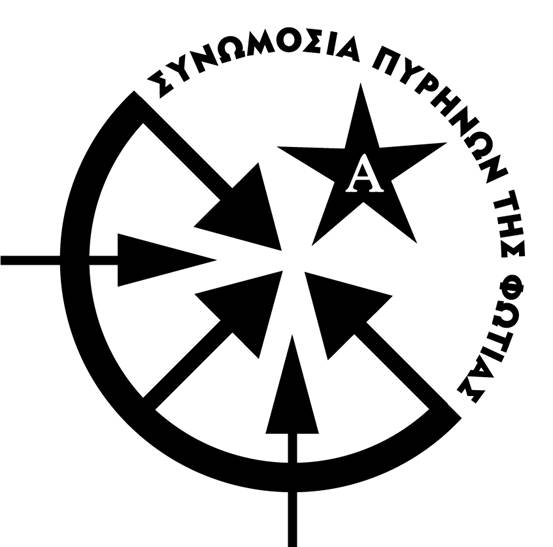
- Other name: Conspiracy of Cells of Fire
- Dates active: 2008–present
- Active regions: Greece
- Status: Active

The Conspiracy of Fire Nuclei (Greek: Συνωμοσία Πυρήνων της Φωτιάς, romanized: Synomosía Pyrínon tis Fotiás, abbrev. SPF), also translated as Conspiracy of Fire Cells or Conspiracy of Cells of Fire, is an anarchist urban guerrilla organization based in Greece. The SPF first surfaced in January 2008, with a wave of 11 firebombings against luxury car dealerships and banks in Athens and Thessaloniki. Monthly waves of arson have been followed by proclamations expressing solidarity with arrested anarchists in Greece and elsewhere. In September 2009, following an escalation to the use of crude time bombs, four suspected members of the group were arrested. In November 2010 two more suspects were arrested while attempting to mail parcel bombs to embassies and EU leaders and organizations.

== History ==
The Conspiracy of Fire Nuclei (SPF) conducted its first wave of nearly simultaneous firebombing attacks using gas canister bombs at around 01:00 on 21 January 2008, to express solidarity with an arrested anarchist. At 17:00 on 20 February an incendiary device was detonated at the Athens law firm of Anastasios Papaligouras, former Minister for Justice. An employee was cut by flying glass. The following day, assailants detonated incendiary devices as part of eight separate attacks across parts of Attica, targeting banks, an insurance company and several vehicles.

The group was credited with at least four attacks in 2009. On 7 July, an explosion occurred outside the house of Panagiotis Chinofotis, a former Minister of Internal Affairs and decorated Admiral of the Hellenic Navy with a tenure as a former Head of the Armed Forces of Greece. The bomb, using gunpowder in a pressure cooker, was subsequently claimed by the Conspiracy of Fire Nuclei, asserting that Chinofotis bore some of the responsibility for the murder of Alexandros Grigoropoulos, the young student whose killing by police officers in December 2008 had led to the 2008 Greek riots. On October 30 a similar device was detonated outside the Athens home of Marietta Giannakou, a prominent conservative opposition Member of the European Parliament, causing minor damage and no injuries. On 14 November a bomb detonated in front of the home of Panhellenic Socialist Movement deputy Mimis Androulakis in the Kareas suburb of eastern Athens. The SPF claimed the attack. On 28 December a more powerful bomb went off in the Athens district of Neos Kosmos, damaging the Ethniki Asfalistiki insurance building off Syngrou Avenue. The group's proclamation announced a new alliance with a group that had access to real explosives.

The SPF took credit for further attacks in 2010, including the explosion of a makeshift bomb on 9 January outside the Greek parliament building, causing minor damage and no injuries, and three bomb attacks on 20 March relating to the immigration issue. The bombs attacked the offices of Greek Nationalist party Golden Dawn, causing significant damage, the home of a Pakistani community leader in Athens, causing slight damage and no injuries, and a bus shelter outside a police station along Petrou Ralli Street in Athens, which was notorious for its violence and conditions, having been implicated in several instances of police violence against immigrants, including the death of two Pakistanis in custody at the station. The latter explosion caused minimal damage and no injuries.

=== Parcel bombs ===
On 1 November 2010, a parcel bomb addressed to the Mexican Embassy in Athens exploded in the office of a courier company, scorching the hands of the employee who handled it. A second package, containing a similar bomb (a small quantity of gunpowder from fireworks) addressed to offices of Eurojust in the Netherlands, was destroyed in a controlled explosion. Two suspects were arrested after police cordoned off the affected area. Both were wearing wigs and armed with Glock 9-mm pistols, and one was wearing a bulletproof vest. They were in possession of two other explosive parcels, one addressed to French President Nicolas Sarkozy and the other to the Belgian Embassy.

By the evening of Tuesday the 3rd of November, the police had found an extra 9 parcel bombs addressed to the Athenian embassies of Bulgaria, Chile, Germany, Mexico, Russia, Switzerland and The Netherlands. Two of the explosive packages exploded on the grounds of the Russian and Swiss embassies respectively. With one reaching the offices of Angela Merkel in Berlin and another addressed to Silvio Berlusconi intercepted on a courier plane. There was a total of 14 bombs counted for.

Greek authorities halted international airmail for 48 hours on 3–4 November 2010, following the mail bombings, and the police were reported to be searching for members of the SPF in relation to the attacks.

In March 2017, a parcel bomb meant for German Finance Minister Wolfgang Schäuble was intercepted. Conspiracy of Fire Cells claimed responsibility for sending that device as the second act in "Project Nemesis". They are also suspected of having sent the parcel bomb that injured an IMF employee in Paris on 16 March. The letter was sent from Greece.

=== 2010–2011 Dutch cell ===
The Conspiracy Cells of Fire, Dutch Cell claimed through June 2010 to February 2011 several arsons on office towers in Utrecht, including the Rabobank headquarters in Utrecht as well as a cyber-attack on Rabobank's website. The cell claimed in its communique: “The attacks on the fascists of Rabobank is dedicated with all our fire to our brothers of the prisoner’s cell of the members of Conspiracy Cells of Fire and the oppressed people of the world. Our comrades and the honest minority of dignified revolutionary Persons political and civil, are not just a piece of our struggle, are not only an aspect of our action, but their choices, attitudes and dignity are the struggle itself as a whole, they are the substance."

=== 2010 Athens courthouse bombing ===
On 30 December 2010, a motorcycle bomb caused major damage to an Athens courthouse, the blast caused massive damage to the courthouse as well as smashing nearby windows and wrecking at least 8 cars. No injuries were sustained as police had evacuated the area after a warning call. A communique appeared online signed "Conspiracy Nuclei of Fire" stated that “We dedicate the attack at the courthouse to our brothers,” targeting the court before the trial of 13 of its suspected members on January 17, 2011.

=== 2011 police shootout ===
In May 2011 a shootout occurred in an Athens suburb between police officers and an individual suspected to be linked to the SPF. Two officers were wounded, as was the suspect. The suspect's fingerprints were allegedly found in an apartment in Volos where numerous SPF members had been previously arrested. A second suspect was reported to have been involved in the shootout, but it is unclear whether that individual was apprehended.

=== 2024 Labour Ministry bombing ===
On February 3, 2024, a bomb detonated outside the Greek Labour Ministry in Athens. Responsibility for the attack was later claimed by a new group calling itself the 'Revolutionary Class Self-Defence'. No casualties were reported in the blast. One of the suspects arrested has been linked to the SPF.

== Arrests and escapes ==
On March 14, 2011, Greek authorities conducted a raid in Athens, arresting six suspected members of the militant group Conspiracy of Fire Nuclei. The individuals were detained in Athens on charges of participating in a terrorist organization and possessing explosives, following a series of letter bomb attacks targeting European officials.

In June 2019, Giannis Michalidis, alleged by police to be a member of Conspiracy Cells of Fire known as “The Syntagma Archer”, escaped from the agricultural prison of Tyrintha. In the same month two Anarchist robbers and an associate with alleged ties to The Conspiracy Cells of Fire were arrested attempting to rob a money delivery van in Thessaloniki. The two men, Yiannis Dimitrakis and Costas Sakkas attempted to rob a delivery van at Thessaloniki's AHEPA Hospital posing as a doctor and patient before being apprehended by Counter-Terrorism officers.

== Ideology ==
Two SPF proclamations published in athens.indymedia.org on 19 May 2010, explained that SPF represented a "third pole" of anarchist thought in Greece, anarcho-individualism, contrasting it with social anarchism and insurrectionary anarchism. In their published text "The Sun Still Rises", they put forward a redefinition of the concept of revolutionary "organization" as an entity consisting of many groups and individuals of various backgrounds, united through a common critique of capitalist society and a commitment to "immediate freedom" through urban guerrilla tactics.

== Foreign reaction ==
The organization was designated as a terrorist group on 13 October 2011, by the U.S. Department of State.

== See also ==
- Anarchism in Greece
- Case of Irianna V.L.
