= Syros strike (1879) =

Syros strike was a workers' strike in Syros, Cyclades, Greece. It started in early 1879, mobilized workers of different industries and ended with the satisfaction of the strikers' demands after violent clashes between the strikers and the police.

== Background ==
Syros was since the proclamation of an independent Greek state a place of thriving commercial and maritime activity. During the 1870s there already existed a shipyard and tanning industries employing around 1500 and 500 workers respectively. In Ermoupoli, the capital of Syros, the first workers' union in Greece was founded named Brotherhood of the carpenters of Syros shipyards (Greek: Αδελφικός Σύλλογος Ξυλουργών του Ναυπηγείου Σύρου). The union was influenced by some socialist tendencies of the era, with reports of an "anarchist workers' cycle".

A monetary crisis had practically reduced the value of the, already low, workers' wages and the working conditions included workdays of more than 12 hours and an extra 2-hour unpaid Sunday work.

== The strike ==
On February 14, the shipwrights started their strike, with the tanning workers joining them on February 19 demanding wage increases, reduction of working hours and abolition of the mandatory unpaid Sunday work.

The demonstrations led to violent clashes between the strikers on the one side and the police and strikebreakers on the other side. During these fights a police officer was hit in the head with a rock and died. The strikers' demands were eventually accepted and the strike ended.

== Aftermath ==
After the strike ended, the strikers returned to their works and massive firings of strikers took place. The gap in workforce was filled with new workers for which the improvements in wages and labor hours gained from the first strike did not apply. This resulted in a new strike being called on February 27, demanding the rehiring of the fired workers, while also respecting the deal reached after the first strike. This strike lasted until July of the same year, without any positive outcome for the workers.
