= Stavros Kallergis =

Greek revolutionary and socialist

- Born: 1865; Khoumeri, Rethymno, Ottoman Crete
- Died: 1926; Khoumeri, Rethymno, Greece
- Occupation(s): Publisher, writer
- Children: Lykourgos Kallergis

Stavros Kallergis (1865–1926) was a Greek revolutionary and socialist. He is known for organizing the first celebration of the First of May in Greece, in 1893, and being active in various socialist groups in fin de siècle Greece. Actor and KKE MP Lykourgos Kallergis was his son. He was related to Dimitrios Kallergis.

== Early life ==
Kallergis was born into a wealthy family in Crete, then part of the Ottoman Empire. His father Georgios participated in the failed Cretan revolt of 1866, and consequently the family moved to Athens. Their relation to Dimitrios Kallergis helped the father get a job in the court of George II. In 1883 Kallergis enrolled at the School of Architecture of the Polytechnic School of the University of Athens. He did not graduate. In 1884, he read an article by Ioannis Soutsos on socialism, which was the first step of his politicization. He was enlisted to the Army in 1886 due to the annexation of Eastern Rumelia by Bulgaria.

== Socialist activist and publisher ==
On May 5, 1890, the day of the funeral of the Greek socialist Rokkos Choidas, Kallergis announced the founding of a new newspaper entitled Sosialistis (Σοσιαλιστής). Kallergis was the publisher, editor and director. The newspaper Sosialistis aimed at "the spread of socialist ideas in the Orient". The motto of Sosialistis was "political freedom, economic equality, freedom of religion". Kallergis conflicted with his father: Kallergis used the stipend his father sent him to fund the magazine, something his father opposed. On December 1, 1893, Kallergis interrupted a speech by Charilaos Trikoupis in the Greek parliament in order to read the resolution of May 1, signed by one thousand people. This led to several negative comments about Kallergis in the Greek press, especially the newspaper Asty, organ of the New Party. Under interrogation, he declared that "my fatherland is the whole Earth and my brothers all the suffering people". In the trial that followed, Kallergis was condemned to ten days in prison.

In 1894, Kallergis departed for Paris. While there he collaborated closely with Pavlos Argyriadis. From the start, Kallergis faced financial difficulties during his residence in France. Argyriadis helped him get a job at the printing house of Leon Fremont in Arcis-sur-Aube. Several other Greek political refugees joined him in France, most notably Dimitrios Zoulas. Kallergis failed to create a network in France and in 1896 (or 1895) he returned to Greece.

In Athens, Kallergis started again to publish Sosialistis. The newspaper appeared every two weeks and it contained articles from the intellectuals Kallergis had met in France. To mark his republican credentials, he used the French Republican calendar. The publication seized after eight issues.

In 1897, Kallergis went to Crete to join the Cretan Uprising. He was elected representative in the Assembly of Arkadi.

In 1904, Kallergis left Athens and returned to Crete.

== Kentrikos Sosialistikos Syllogos ==
On 20 July 1890, Kallergis was among the founders of the Kentrikos Sosialistikos Syllogos. The meeting that led to the foundation of this club took place in Kallergis house on Agiou Markou street. It is possible that the intention was to turn Syllogos into a political party, as socialist parties were founded in the same era in the Balkans.

== Stavros Kallergis Foundation ==
Founded in Rethymno, it housed the Kallergis Archives. It was dissolved in 2017 because of lack of funds and because its main aims were accomplished. The Archives were taken over by the Benaki Museum.

== Sources ==
- Καρπόζηλος, Κωστής (2013). Αρχείο Σταύρου Καλλέργη − Ψηφίδες από τον σχεδιασμό της σοσιαλιστικής πολιτείας. Athens: Εκδόσεις του Μουσείου Μπενάκη.
- Νούτσος, Παναγιώτης (1995). Η σοσιαλιστική σκέψη στην Ελλάδα από το 1875-1907 – Ι: Οι σοσιαλιστές διανοούμενοι και η πολιτική λειτουργία της πρώιμης κοινωνικής κριτικής. Athens: Γνώση.
- "Η Εργατική Πρωτομαγιά". Rizospastis. 29 April 2012.
- Λυκούργος Καλλέργης (April 1995). "Σταύρος Καλλέργης-Μια σκιαγραφία". rethnea.
- "Διαλύθηκε το "Ίδρυμα Κοινωνικών – Ιστορικών Ερευνών – Σταύρος Καλλέργης"". Ρέθεμνος. 18 September 2017.
