= Cities Police =

Former Greek police force

Cities Police Astynomia Poleon Αστυνομία Πόλεων
- Badge of Cities Police, 1935–1941, 1944-1973 (left) and 1974–1984 (right)

Agency overview
- Formed: 1921
- Dissolved: 1 November 1984
- Superseding agency: Hellenic Police
- Employees: 10,000–12,000

Jurisdictional structure
- Operations jurisdiction: Greece
- Legal jurisdiction: City of Athens, Piraeus, Patras and Corfu (city)
- Governing body: Ministry of Public Order
- Constituting instruments: Law 2461/1920 On the Cities' Police, as complemented by Law 3095/1924; Law 3754/1929 On the competences of the Cities' Police
- General nature: Civilian police

Notables
- Anniversary: St. Menas' feast day (Annually, 11 November)

The Cities Police (Greek: Αστυνομία Πόλεων) was a Greek police force extant from 1921 to 1984, responsible for policing urban areas. It complemented the Hellenic Gendarmerie, which was responsible for rural and suburban areas.

== History ==
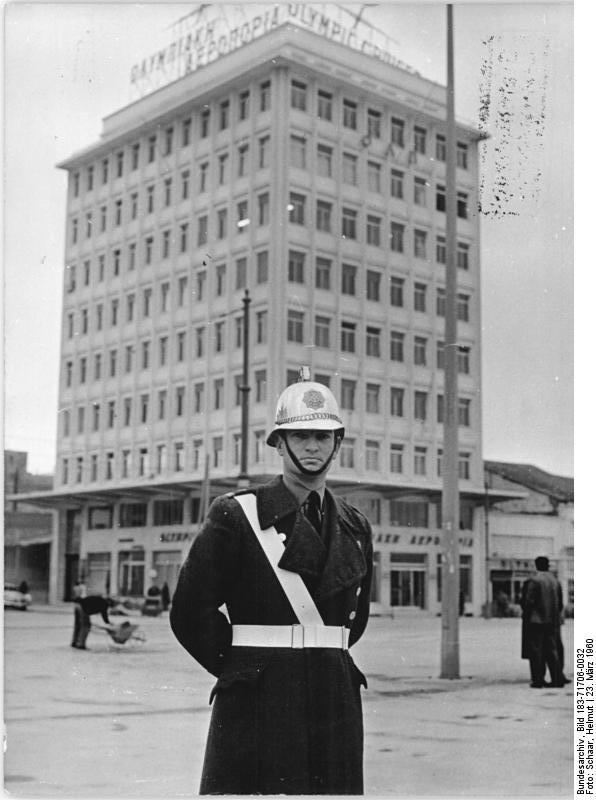
Α road traffic policeman of the Cities Police in Athens, 1960

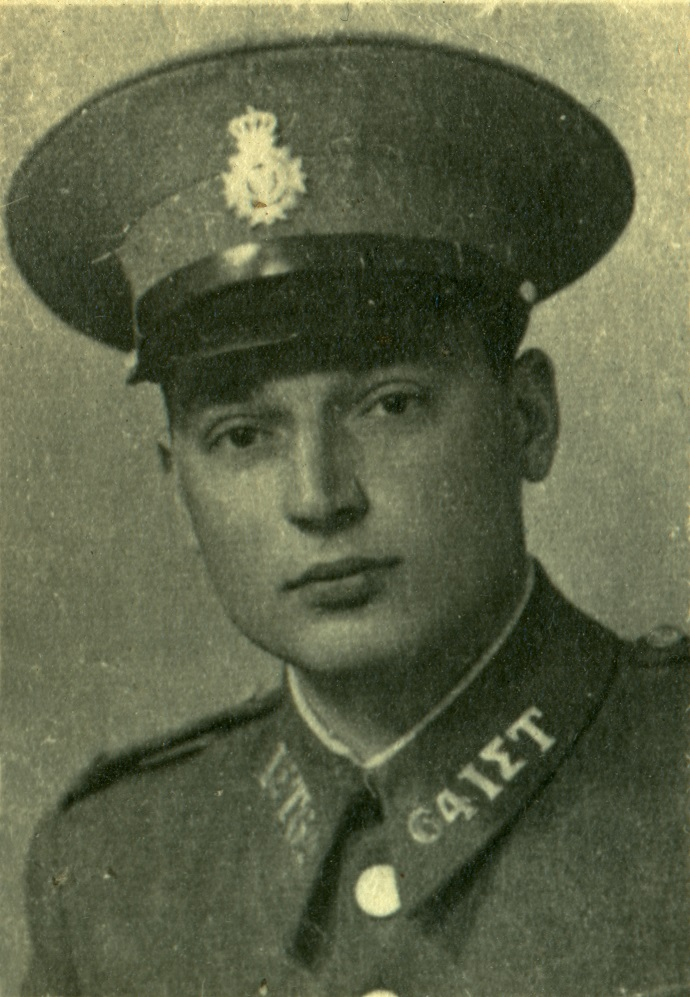
A policeman of the Cities Police in the 16th department of Athens, c. 1964

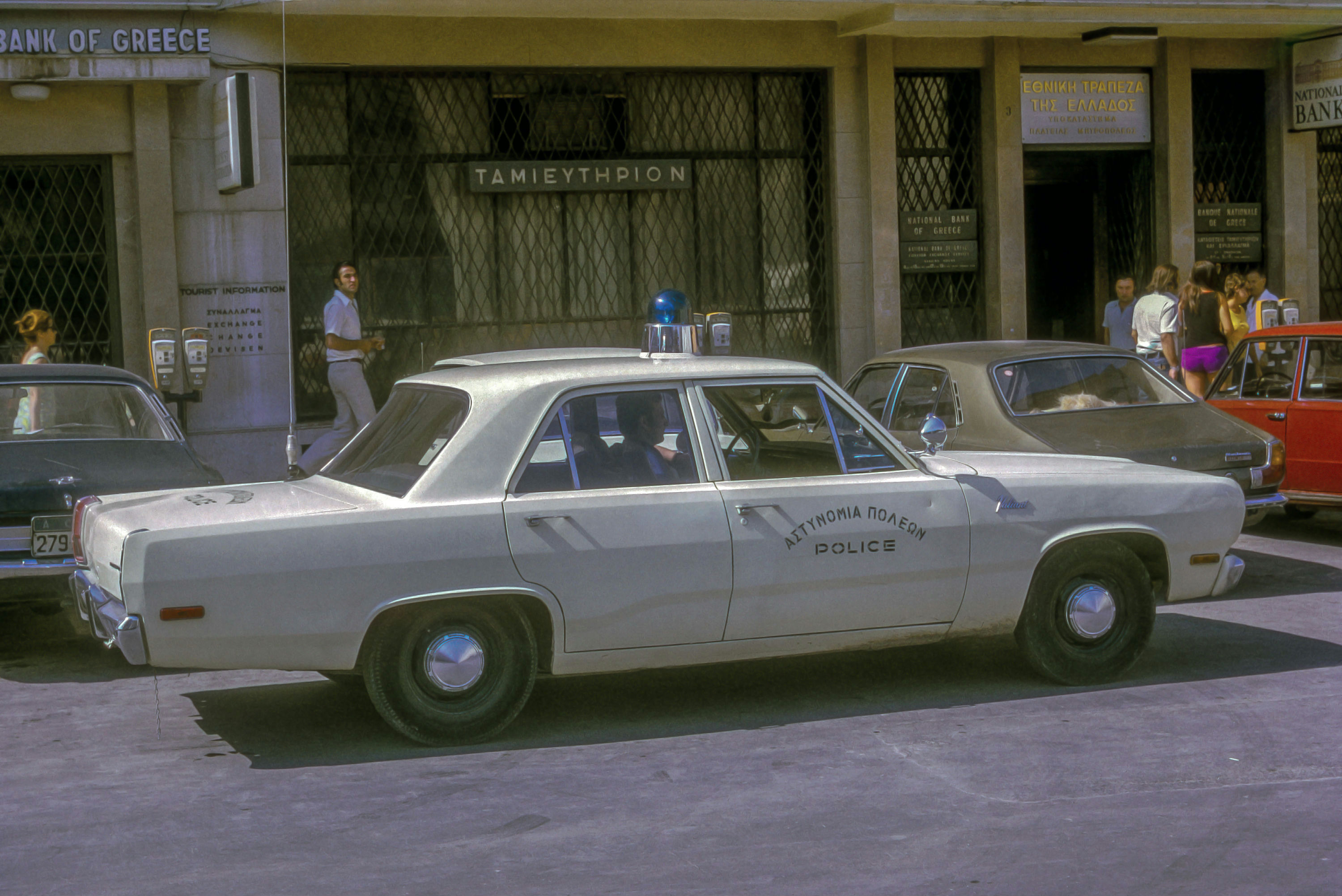
Plymouth Valiant vehicle of the Cities Police in Athens, 1973

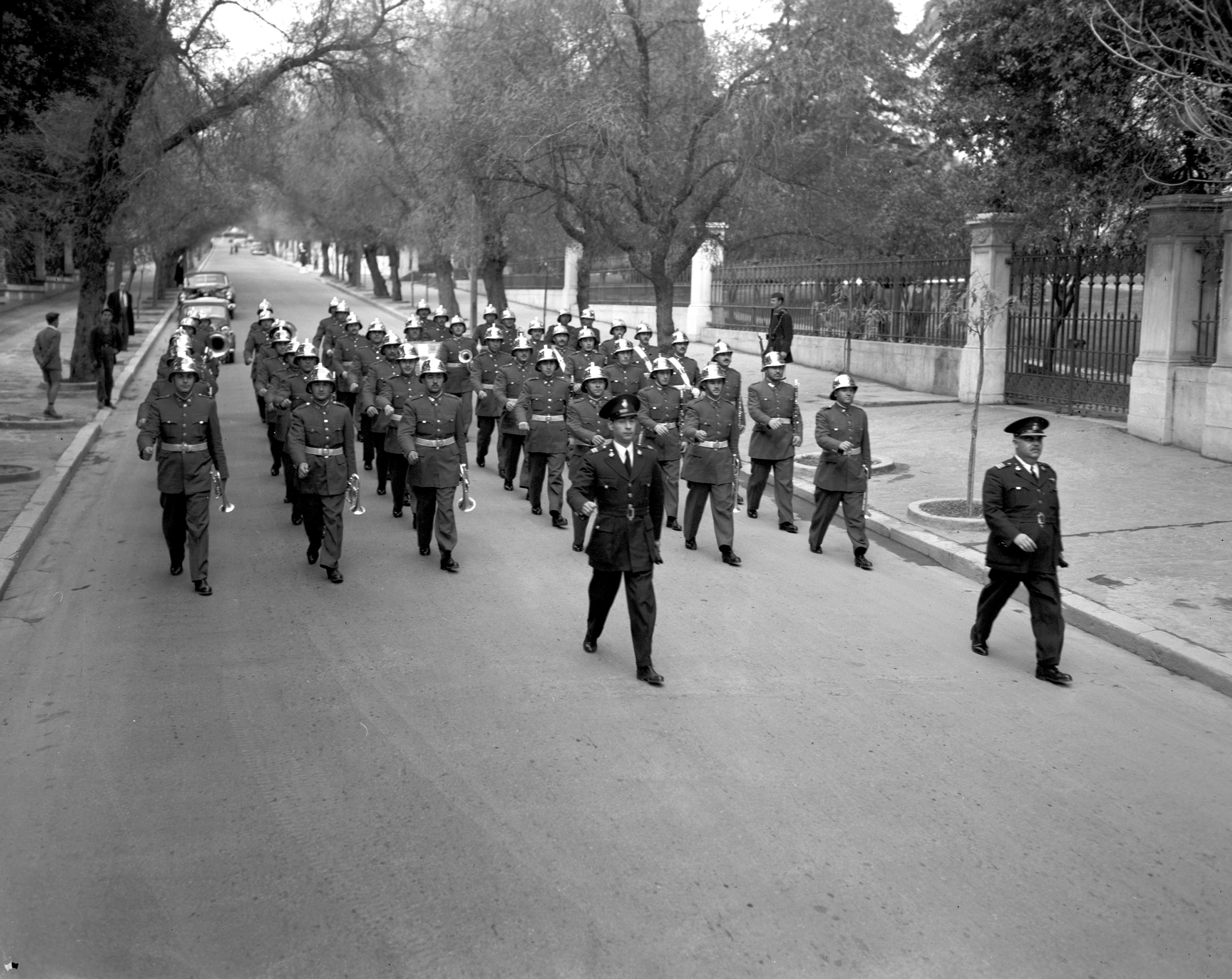
Band of the Cities Police marches down Herodou Attikou Street in central Athens, early 1950s

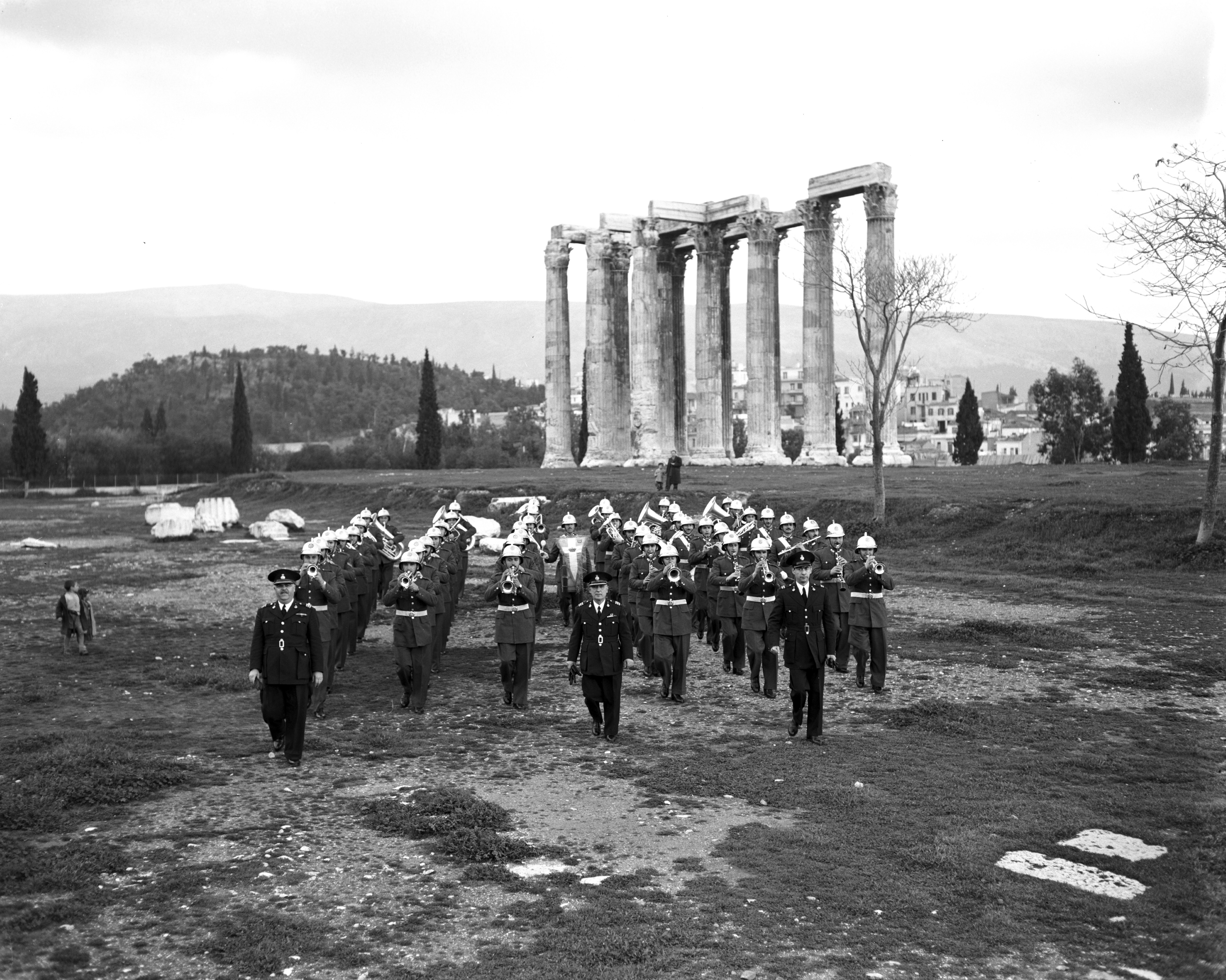
Band of the Cities Police at the Temple of Olympian Zeus, Athens, early 1950s

Its creation was decreed in 1918 (Article 12 of the Law 1370/1918 On the organization of the Gendarmerie) and confirmed in 1920 (Law 2461/1920). The force became operational in the city of Corfu in 1920, followed by Patras (1921), Piraeus (1923) and Athens (1929). Remarkably, in Thessaloniki, Greece's second largest city, the force was not established due to the Gendarmerie's opposition, despite the law's provisions.

Unlike the paramilitary Gendarmerie, which had close ties to the Hellenic Army and was commanded by Army generals, the Cities Police was a purely civilian force, modeled after the Metropolitan Police of London, and with training provided by a British mission under Sir Frederick Loch Halliday.

From the late 1920s, the Cities Police, and especially its feared General Security Directorate, initiated the state persecution of the nascent Communist Party of Greece (KKE), whose popularity was growing among the urban poor, the working classes and the destitute refugees from Asia Minor. In the aftermath of the Greek Civil War, the Gendarmerie and the Cities Police became bastions of the conservative and vehemently anti-Communist establishment, a role they would retain throughout the Greek junta of 1967–74. After the fall of the junta, emphasis was placed on civilian policing. Despite strong opposition from the Gendarmerie and the Cities Police, both forces were amalgamated on 1 November 1984 (Law 1481/1-10-1984) into the unified Hellenic Police.

== Ranks insignia ==
Cities Police Officer Ranks & Insignia
Commissioner; Αντιστράτηγος	Deputy Commissioner; Υποστράτηγος	Brigadier; Ταξίαρχος	Police Director; Αστυνομικός Διευθυντής	Police Deputy Director; Αστυνομικός Υποδιευθυντής	Police Captain I Class; Αστυνόμος Α'	Police Captain II Class; Αστυνόμος Β'	Police Lieutenant I Class; Υπαστυνόμος Α'	Police Lieutenant II Class; Υπαστυνόμος B'

Cities Police NCO Ranks & Insignia
Police Warrant Officer; Ανθυπαστυνόμος	Police Chief Sergeant-Interrogation Officer with exams Αρχιφύλακας-ανακριτικός υπάλληλος με εξετάσεις	Police Staff Sergeant-Interrogation Officer; Αρχιφύλακας-ανακριτικός υπάλληλος	Police Staff Sergeant-Non interrogation officer Αρχιφύλακας-μη ανακριτικός υπάλληλος	Police Sergeant-Interrogation Officer; Υπαρχιφύλακας-ανακριτικός υπάλληλος	Police Sergeant-Interrogation Officer; Υπαρχιφύλακας-μη ανακριτικός υπάλληλος	Policeman; Αστυφύλακας
