= Anna Reynolds (writer) =

British novelist, playwright, and screenwriter

Anna Reynolds (born 1 June 1968) is a British novelist, playwright, and screenwriter. She is the author of Tightrope (1991) and Jordan, which was voted "Best Play of 1992" at the Writers Guild Awards, and co-author of The Winding Sheet, a film that won a Silver Hugo at the Chicago Film Festival. Her first novel, Insanity, was published in 1996.

== Publications ==
Reynolds has had 10 plays professionally produced, including Jordan, Red (Clean Break Theatre Company), Precious (West Yorkshire Playhouse), Wild Things (Salisbury Playhouse), Look At Me (Theatre Centre/Mercury Theatre), Deep Joy (Mercury Theatre), Skin Hunger (Time Out Critics Choice, BAC), Ring Road Tales (Watford Palace Theatre), and Sweetie Pie (Menagerie Theatre Company, Cambridge Arts Centre and Latchmere Theatre London). She has also written a feminist play; Nothing on Earth. Her screenplay Paradise was broadcast by the BBC and The Winding Sheet by Channel 4 Television in the UK.

She has written for The Times, The Guardian, New Statesman, The Observer, and The Big Issue.

She is one of the founders of the British writers' group writewords.org.uk.

== Personal life ==
In 1986, at the age of 17, Anna Reynolds suffered a severe episode of premenstrual stress syndrome, which led to her killing her mother. Reynolds was initially convicted for murder, but after she had served 2 years at Durham Prison, the verdict was overturned based on evidence provided by Dr Katharina Dalton, clarifying that the incident was the result of the condition.
