= Terrorism in Greece =

Terrorism in Greece has roots in the political turmoil of the 20th century, particularly following the military dictatorship known as "junta" (1967–1974). The junta's brutal repression and violent crackdown on dissent sparked widespread public anger and radicalization, culminating in the 1973 Athens Polytechnic uprising when student protests were violently crushed by military force. In the aftermath, several extremist groups emerged, most prominently the far-Left Revolutionary Organization 17 November (17N), which targeted U.S., British, and Greek officials in a campaign of assassinations and bombings. These groups framed their actions as resistance against imperialism, capitalism, and the remnants of authoritarianism.

Although the Junta fell in 1974 and democracy was restored, proliferation of terrorism was amplified in the 1980s by the soft stance of Prime Minister Andreas Papandreou's administrations by repealing previous anti-terrorism legislation and with his Arab opening in foreign policy. Terrorism reached at its peak in the Koskotas scandal where Pavlos Bakoyannis, a member of Parliament and prominent figure in the indictment of Papandreou and four of his ministers, was assassinated. In 2001, Greece adopted a stable counter-terrorism framework that led to the dismantling of 17N just before the 2004 Olympic Games. However, the terrorism legacy continued to exert influence, with various anarchist and revolutionary factions carrying out sporadic attacks into the 21st century. The financial crisis of 2008 led to the increase of nationalism and the appearance of far-right extremist groups, such as Golden Dawn, who became the country's third largest party in the September 2015 election but was criminalised in 2020 after narrowly being voted out of parliament in the 2019 election, following the culmination of a five–year trial that declared it a criminal organisation and sentenced its political leadership.

== History ==
=== First legislation ===
After the restoration of democracy in 1974, Greece was going through a stabilization phase, but terrorist attacks started to rise. Many youths, inspired by the Athens Polytechnic uprising, were sympathetic to Left-wing organizations advocating violence against authority. The slowing down of the economy and the high inflation caused by the oil crisis in the 1970s fueled the rise of these incidents. In response, Prime Minister Konstantinos Karamanlis passed the 1978 anti-terrorist law (Law 774/1978), which was based on the recently enacted Italian and German anti-terrorist bills. At the time, opposition leader Andreas Papandreou decried the law on the basis that it suppresses civil liberties and the Greek constitution, and he further claimed that no such law is required simply because Greece does not have the social and political conditions for people to cause such violence.

=== Stance of Papandreou ===
Papandreou's ascent to power in late 1981 marked a major shift in policy. He abolished Karamanlis' law (without proposing an alternative) based on the argument that this law "does not concern the terrorists, but it creates the ideological and political conditions to terrorize the Greek populace." He also made an opening to Arab regimes (see details in his Foreign policy). Specifically, he improved relations with 'radical' Arab nations, such as Muammar Gaddafi's Libya, Hafez al-Assad's Syria, and letting Palestine Liberation Organization (PLO) members stay in Greece, antagonizing the United States. However, the combination of these policies effectively let terrorists operate in Greece in the 1980s with impunity.

Papandreou's soft stance on terrorism created friction with the Reagan administration. In June 1985, international attention was drawn to the hijacking of TWA Flight 847 from the Athens airport. After this incident and Papandreou's inaction on the matter, the U.S. produced a travel advisory against Greece, resulting in an 80% drop in U.S. visitors and loss of considerable tourism income. In November 1985, another hijack from Athens resulted in 61 dead.

The reputation of Greece as a tourist destination deteriorated further by the frequency of incidents; in 1986 alone, there were twenty bombings in Athens. Infighting between Arab groups led to a series of anti-Gaddafi dissidents being found murdered and Syrian agents killing PLO members on Greek soil. On 11 July 1988, nine tourists were killed, and eighty others were wounded in an attack on the Greek ferry boat at the City of Poros. PASOK's response to these events was to deny them by claiming that it was an American conspiracy (as in the case of the Poros incident), or that terrorists were freedom fighters. A notable example of the latter was Ozama Al Zomar's release from prison and his extradition to Libya instead of Italy, where he was suspected by Italian police of the Great Synagogue of Rome attack. Papandreou's Justice Minister, Vassilis Rotis, explained this course of action by justifying that the attack "falls within his struggle to regain the independence of his homeland and consequently suggests action for freedom."

=== Rise of 17 November ===
The symbol of November 17 terrorist organization, which operated largely undisturbed under Papandreou's reign.

The primary terrorist organization in Greece was Revolutionary Organization 17 November (17N). Operating from December 1975 until its dismantling in 2002, it assassinated 23 people, mainly Western diplomats with military or intelligence roles and prominent businessmen. Soon after taking power, Papandreou closed down the police unit investigating the organization. In the first two years of Papandreou's rule, the 17N organization was inactive. Presumably, Papandreou's anti-EU, anti-NATO rhetoric aligned with 17N goals.

After the new agreement for the U.S. bases to stay on Greek soil (see negotiation of U.S. bases), 17N turned against Papandreou. In 1985, in an attack responding to the death of a 15-year-old boy by police, the organization claimed that Papandreou's PASOK is "now working for the Right, which explains why it has yet to be overthrown." It also turned against industrialists based on the belief that they were getting large bonuses from Papandreou's governments, state money meant for investments and instead used for increasing their wealth. Notable deaths were the President of the Halyvourgiki Hellenic Steel Industry, Dimitrios Angelopoulos, in 1986, and two years later the Director of LARCO, Alexandros Athanassiadis. The 17N organization power reached a turning point in the Koskotas scandal when a parliamentary member and the architect of indictment of Papandreou and four ministers, Pavlos Bakoyannis, was assassinated.

=== Misplaced surveillance ===
For much of the 1980s, Greek police remained underfunded and demoralized, weakened by Papandreou's anti-authoritarian rhetoric, resulting in few terrorist convictions. At the same time, Papandreou used the junta's surveillance infrastructure exclusively to keep track of his political enemies, labeled as terrorists, including well-respected politicians such as Karamanlis, from political opposition Konstantinos Mitsotakis and Evangelos Averoff, senior ministers in PASOK governments who may be potential successors such as Costas Simitis and Georgios Gennimatas, newspaper publishers, police chiefs, and even PASOK's governmental spokesman.

=== Change of course ===
The change of course from Papandreou's policy on terrorism came from Mitsotakis' government in the early 1990s by reinstating Karamanlis' anti-terrorism legislation (Law 1916/1990) and any terrorists found, and the PLO representatives were expelled. In 1993, upon the return of PASOK to power, it repealed the new legislation. Papandreou resigned from PASOK leadership in January 1996 and died in June of the same year. Later, his successor, Simitis, passed new anti-terrorist legislation in 2001 (Law 2928/01), and he brought to justice the 17N organization before the 2004 Olympic Games.

== List of active and dismantled terrorist organizations ==
=== Nihilist Faction ===
The Nihilist Faction (Greek: Φράξια Μηδενιστών, romanized: Fraxia Midheniston) was a nihilist anarchist organization in Greece, which claimed responsibility for a 28 May 1996 bombing of IBM offices in Athens. The attack caused extensive structural damage but no injuries. The group claimed responsibility in a statement for other attacks in April of this year, like the arson of the deputy prosecutor of the Supreme Court of Greece and former president of the Prosecutors' Association, and a fire bombing against a shopping center on Tsakalof Street in Kolonaki, leaving material damages in both incidents. The group was founded in 1996.

=== Revolutionary People's Struggle ===
Revolutionary People's Struggle (Greek: Επαναστατικός Λαϊκός Αγώνας (ΕΛΑ), romanized: Epanastatikos Laikos Agonas (ELA)) was a far-left urban guerilla organization that operated between 1975 and 1995 before its members announcing its disbandment. It was the largest terrorist organization by number of group members in Greece.

=== Revolutionary Organization 17 November ===
N17 was a Greek far-left Marxist–Leninist urban guerrilla organization formed in 1975. The Greek government arrested many members of the 17 November organization in the summer of 2002. In 2003 15 members were found guilty of multiple murders and convicted for more than 2,500 crimes.

=== Revolutionary Struggle ===
The Revolutionary Struggle was a far-left Greek paramilitary group known for its attacks on Greek government buildings. It was widely described as a terrorist organization by both the Greek government and the media.

=== Revolutionary Nuclei ===
Revolutionary Nuclei (RN) was, anti-U.S., anti-NATO, and anti-European Union urban guerrilla organization that conducted 13 bomb attacks in Athens between 1996 and 2000. The first attack for which RN took credit was a bomb attack on Greek Coast Guard installations in Piraeus on 11 May 1997, but it later acknowledged that two earlier attacks were carried out by RN members. Per its four proclamations, RN fought against the "imperialist domination, exploitation, and oppression" of Greece.

On 27 April 1999 an RN bomb targeting a conference at the InterContinental Hotel in Athens killed one person (Despite telephoned warnings, the building was not evacuated). In December 1999 RN set off explosives near Texaco's offices in Athens.

=== Revolutionary Self-Defense ===
The Revolutionary Self-Defense was a militant anarchist organisation formed in 2014, it was dismantled in 2019. It claimed to fight to "construct a mass internationalist revolutionary movement, by strengthening militant resistance on the entire spectrum of class antagonism". On November 10, 2016, a police officer, who had been on guard outside the embassy, was wounded when unknown assailants threw a hand grenade on the French embassy building, days later the group claimed responsibility for the attack. Militants shot against members of the riot police when they are parked in the downtown in Athens, Greece. The incidents left no one injured. The group was suspected of a 2016 grenade attack the Russian embassy in Athens.

=== Black Star ===
Black Star (also known as Mavro Asteri; Greek: Μαύρο Αστέρι) was a Greek anarchist urban guerrilla group involved in violent direct action.

During the period between May 1999 and October 2002, Black Star was one of the most active anarchist groups in Greece. They described themselves as anti-imperialist, anti-establishment, and anti-capitalist. The group declared itself to be dedicated to "resistance against the mass organizations of US imperialism and to their local collaborators." They believed that "the only terrorists are the US imperialist forces, their European allies, and their local capitalist associates."

== Timeline ==
Greece
| Date | Location | Deaths | Injuries | Type | Perpetrator | Description |
|---|---|---|---|---|---|---|
| 2 September 1970 | Athens | 2 | - | Car bomb | Anarchists | -- Diplomatic (United States) At 16:00 (UTC+2), a bomb -- planted inside a car -- exploded in the parking area of the United States Embassy on Queen Sophia Avenue in Athens, killing a man and a woman. Neither of the casualties were Embassy personnel. The two victims were allegedly responsible for making and transporting the bomb. |
| 5 August 1973 | Athens | 5 | 55 | Grenade & Small arms fire | Black September Organization (Palestinian nationalists) | -- Airports & Airlines 1973 Athens Hellinikon International Airport attack - Two Arab gunmen staged an armed assault on passengers near the Trans World Airlines lounge, within the Athens International Airport, killing five and wounding up to 60 others. Three foreigners (two Americans and an Austrian) were among the deceased. The initial target was intended to be passengers on a flight to Tel Aviv. |
| 24 February 1974 | Lavrion | 2 | - | Improvised explosive device | People's Resistance Organized Army | -- Business A bomb at an American-owned Dow Chemical plant south of Athens killed two Army bomb disposal experts. |
| 23 December 1975 | Athens | 1 | - | Small arms fire | Revolutionary Organization 17 November | -- Diplomatic (United States) Five men in a stolen Simca followed Richard Welch, U.S. Central Intelligence Agency's station chief in Athens, home as he returned from a Christmas party. While two men covered his wife and driver, a third shot him dead with a .45 Colt M1911 pistol at close range. |
| 17 January 1980 | Athens | 2 | - | Small arms fire | Revolutionary Organization 17 November | -- Government institutions Pantelis Petrou, the deputy director of the Monades Apokatastasis Taksis (Riot police), was shot to death in an Athens suburb by three assailants using two 45mm pistols. A few days later Sotiris Stamoulis, his driver, also died from the wounds inflicted during the attack. |
| 31 July 1980 | Athens | 2 | 2 | Small arms fire | ASALA (Armenian nationalists) | -- Diplomatic (Turkey) Armenian gunmen attacked the Turkish Embassy Administrative Attaché, Galip Ozmen, and his family as they were waiting in their automobile at a traffic light. Mr. Ozmen and his fourteen-year-old daughter, Neslihan Ozmen, were killed. His wife, Sevil Ozmen, and his sixteen-year-old son, Kaan Ozmen, were seriously wounded but survived. |
| 21 July 1981 | Athens | 2 | - | Small arms fire | Neo-fascists | -- Private citizens & property Two gunmen opened fire on the offices of the Angeli Koussis Shipping and Tourism Co., killing two employees of the firm. |
| 7 November 1983 | Athens | 1 | 1 | Small arms fire | Unknown | -- Diplomatic (Jordan) A gunman shot two security guards in front of the Jordanian Embassy, in a tour alley near the Acropolis. One of the victims died of his injuries. |
| 15 November 1983 | Athens | 2 | - | Small arms fire | Revolutionary Organization 17 November | -- Diplomatic (United States) George Tsantes, deputy chief of the U.S. military assistance mission (JUSMAGG), along with his driver Nick Veloutsos, were shot dead by two young people riding a motorcycle, using a .45 caliber pistol. |
| 28 March 1984 | Athens | 2 | - | Small arms fire | Abu Nidal Organization (Palestinian nationalists) | -- Diplomatic (United Kingdom) British Cultural Attache and British Council representative Kenneth Whitty was killed in his car on an Athens street by a single gunman. His passenger, fellow British council employee Artemis Economidou, was seriously wounded and later succumbed to her injuries. |
| 2 February 1985 | Athens | - | 78 | Time bomb | Greek Cypriots Ultranationalists | -- Foreign military targets (United States) Cyprus associated ultranationalists bombed a bar popular with American airmen stationed nearby. |
| 21 February 1985 | Athens | 2 | - | Small arms fire | Revolutionary Organization 17 November | -- Business Major Greek center-right press publisher and banker, Nikolaos Momferatos, was shot and killed by a gunman. His driver, Panagiotis Rousetis, also died in the attack in the Athens suburb of Kolonaki. |
| 15 May 1985 | Athens | 4 | - | Small arms fire | Anti-State Struggle | -- Political On 15 May 1985 in Gyzi, near central Athens, three police officers investigating recent political murders detected a stolen motorcycle near Tsoutsouvis' apartment building. As they were investigating, Tsoutsouvis and an accomplice opened fire. Three police officers were killed in the exchange. Tsoutsouvis was also killed and his accomplice escaped. |
| 26 November 1985 | Athens | 1 | 14 | Car bomb | Revolutionary Organization 17 November | -- Government institutions A car-bomb explosion next to a Greek riot police bus in Kaisariani, Athens, kills police officer Ioannis Georgakopoulos and injures 14 more. The 17N proclamation states that the attack was made to avenge the death of 15-year-old Michalis Kaltezas during clashes at the day of the rally commemorating the public uprising that led to the fall of the Greek military junta. |
| 24 April and 10 August 1987 | Athens | - | 30 | Car bomb | Revolutionary Organization 17 November | -- Foreign military targets (United States) On two separate days, bomb attacks against buses carrying American soldiers injured 30 people in total. |
| 28 June 1988 | Athens | 1 | - | Car bomb | Revolutionary Organization 17 November | -- Diplomatic (United States) A car bomb, detonated by remote control, kills the US naval attache in Athens. Capt. William Nordeen was killed instantly by the blast that originated in a vehicle parked by his house. |
| 11 July 1988 | Athens | 11 | 98 | Car bomb -- Grenade & Small arms fire | Abu Nidal Organization (Palestinian nationalists) | -- Private citizens & property Three gunmen board the ship, City of Poros, as part of its normal intake of passengers at Aegina, and wait until the ship had left the port and is three miles into its journey before they attack, at approximately 20:30 (UTC+02:00). Using concealed automatic weapons and hand grenades, they opened fire on their fellow passengers, who scattered in panic, many jumping overboard, which inadvertently caused many casualties among people who became caught in the ship's propellers. Nine tourists are killed and up to 100 others are wounded. On the day of the attack, there were 471 people on board the ship. Earlier on the day of the attack, the pier that the City of Poros usually berthed at in Piraeus was rocked by the detonation of a large car bomb. The only fatalities were the two occupants of the vehicle. See also: City of Poros ship attack |
| 27 September 1989 | Athens | 1 | - | Small arms fire | Revolutionary Organization 17 November | -- Government institutions Pavlos Bakoyannis, the spokesman of the leading political party at the time -- New Democracy -- is shot and killed in the hallway of his office in downtown Athens. |
| 12 March 1991 | Athens | 1 | - | Improvised explosive device | Revolutionary Organization 17 November | -- Foreign government institutions (United States) United States Air Force member, Sgt. Ronald O. Stewart, is killed by a remotely detonated bomb outside his apartment in the seaside Athens suburb of Glyfada. Sgt. Stewart had been working at the United States Air Base at Hellenikon. |
| 19 April 1991 | Patras | 7 | 7 | Improvised explosive device | Union of Palestinian Students (Palestinian nationalists) | -- Private citizens & property A parcel bomb explodes in the offices of a courier service, killing seven people and wounding seven others in the western port city of Patras 1991 Patras bombing. Six of the dead were employees and the other a customer. The bombed building also housed offices of an American concern, United Parcel International, and is near the British Consulate. |
| 14 July 1992 | Athens | 1 | 5 | Rocket propelled grenade fire | Revolutionary Organization 17 November | -- Government institutions The Greek Minister of Finance, Ioannis Paleokrassas, narrowly escapes assassination when terrorists launch a 3.5 inch RPG round at his armored limousine in broad daylight. The attack, near the center of Athens, kills a bystander and injures 5 other people, including Minister Paleokrassas. The Minister had been driving out of his office accompanied by his wife and daughter. |
| 24 January 1994 | Athens | 1 | - | Small arms fire | Revolutionary Organization 17 November | -- Government institutions The former chairman of Greece's largest state-owned bank, Michalis Vranopoulos, is shot to death on an Athens street. He had been testifying in a judicial investigation into the bank's potentially fraudulent sale of a majority stake in a cement company. |
| 4 July 1994 | Athens | 1 | - | Small arms fire | Revolutionary Organization 17 November | -- Diplomatic (Turkey) Deputy Chief of Mission at the Turkish Embassy in Athens, Ömer Haluk Sipahioğlu, is shot and killed on an Athens street. Authorities believe three men in a car pulled alongside the vehicle of the second-ranking Turkish diplomat in Greece and opened fire, killing him. |
| 28 May 1997 | Athens | 1 | - | Small arms fire | Revolutionary Organization 17 November | -- Business Greek shipping tycoon, Constantine Peratikos, is shot to death in broad daylight on an Athens street. The group issued a manifesto claiming that Peratikos was targeted because he allegedly misused a large government bailout and threatened to close down his shipyard, which would have forced the layoff of 2,000 employees. |
| 17 November 1999 | Athens | 1 | - | Improvised explosive device | Revolutionary Nuclei | -- Private citizens & property A Greek bystander is killed when a bomb explodes near the Intercontinental Hotel, where then United States President Bill Clinton was due to stay on a state visit to Greece. |
| 8 June 2000 | Athens | 1 | - | Small arms fire | Revolutionary Organization 17 November | -- Diplomatic (United Kingdom) At approximately 7:48 (UTC+2) two gunmen on a motorcycle shoot Brig. Stephen Saunders, the military attaché at the British Embassy in Athens, while he was driving alone on a busy suburban street to work at the British Embassy. The gunmen escaped in traffic. Brigadier Saunders died of his wounds at the hospital. |
| 17 June 2009 | Athens | 1 | - | Small arms fire | Sect of Revolutionaries | -- Government institutions Several gunmen shoot a 41-year-old anti-terrorism officer several times at close range. The officer died in his car as the assailants fled on motorcycles in the densely populated Patissia area of Athens. |
| 28 July 2009 | Athens | - | - | Improvised explosive device and firebombing | Illuminating Paths of Solidarity | -- Private citizens & government property Unknown assailants firebombed at least four New Democracy party offices in Koukaki, Attica, others in Drapetsona, Kaminia, Chalandri, three PASOK offices in Votanikos and Goudi (both in Attica), being claimed by Illuminating Paths of Solidarity. |
| 28 March 2010 | Athens | 1 | 2 | Improvised explosive device | Unknown | -- Private citizens & property A bomb exploded outside an institute for training public officials in the Patissia area of the Greek capital Athens, killing a 15-year-old boy. The boy's 10-year-old sister was seriously injured and their mother, 45, was slightly hurt. Police said the family, were apparently just walking past the building when the bomb, contained in a bag, exploded. |
| 24 June 2010 | Athens | 1 | - | Improvised explosive device | Revolutionary Struggle | -- Government institutions A powerful bomb sent in a package to the minister of public order explodes near his office, killing his 50-year-old assistant, who opened the package. The minister, Michalis Chrysochoidis, who was in charge of the police and counter-terrorism as Minister of Public Order, Michalis was not in his office at the time. |
| 19 July 2010 | Athens | 1 | - | Small arms fire | Sect of Revolutionaries | -- Journalists & Media The Greek reporter and radio station news director Sokratis Giolias was shot by leftist urban guerrillas. Their weapons were matched to earlier shootings by the Sect of Revolutionaries. See also: Assassination of Sokratis Giolias |
| 17 June 2012 | Athens | - | - | Hand grenades | Unknown | -- Journalists & Media Unknown threw two hand grenades, which failed to explode, at the headquarters of Skai TV station. |
| 26 June 2012 | Athens | - | - | Firebombing | Deviant Conduct by the Spread of Revolutionary Terrorism | -- Political Gunmen drove a van to the Microsoft offices in Marousi, Athens, the blast of the van caused significant material damage. The office, was closed for one day. The attack was claimed by an unknown guerrilla organization naming themselves: Deviant Conduct by the Spread of Revolutionary Terrorism. |
| 4 July 2013 | Athens | - | - | Firebombing | Zero Tolerance | -- Political On 4 July an office belonging to Fevronia Patrianakou, a member of the parliament was firebombed, causing material damages. "Zero Tolerance", claimed the attack, said Patrianakou, member of New Democracy is part of their campaign to punish those who are contributing to the strengthening of the Greek government. Zero Tolerance is an anarchist cell that has perpetrated attacks in the metropolitan area of Athens. |
| 1 November 2013 | Athens | 2 | 1 | Small arms fire | The Fighting People's Revolutionary Powers | -- Political On 1 November 2013, two Golden Dawn members, Giorgos Fountoulis (27 years old) and Manos Kapelonis (22 years old), were shot dead outside the party's offices in Neo Irakleio, a northern suburb of Athens. A third one, Alexandros Gerontas, was severely injured. According to a Golden Dawn member, two men on a motorcycle wearing helmets fired into the group. Two weeks later, the previously unknown "anti-establishment" group "The Fighting People's Revolutionary" Powers claimed responsibility for what it described characterized them as "political executions of the fascist members of the neo-Nazi Golden Dawn party". See also: 2013 Neo Irakleio Golden Dawn office shooting |
| 14 January 2014 | Athens | - | - | Firebombing | Zero Tolerance | -- Political On 14 January, members of Zero Tolerance firebombed the office of the Interior Minister, Yiannis Michelakis, leaving important material damage. |
| 12 July 2014 | Athens | - | - | Hand grenade | Nuclei Of Nullists | -- Journalists & Media The left-wing terrorist group threw a hand grenade, which failed to explode, at the headquarters of Skai TV station, in support for the left-wing terrorists Christodoulos Xiros and Nikos Maziotis. |
| 14 January 2015 | Athens | - | - | Firebombing | Zero Tolerance | -- Political On 14 January, assailants blasts an office of Adonis Georgiadis a conservative Member of Parliament, which leaves material damages. Zero Tolerance claimed the attack in a statement and demanded the closure of "Type C" prisons. |
| 17 December 2018 | Athens | - | - | Bombing | Popular Fighters Group | -- Journalists & Media On 17 December a bomb exploded in the headquarters of the media station Skai TV. There were no casualties but extensive damage was done to the building. The left-wing terrorist group Popular Fighters Group was behind the attack. The militant group has been behind similar bomb attacks against the downtown Athens headquarters of the Federation of Greek Industries in November 2015. |
| 3 February 2024 | Athens | - | - | Bombing | Revolutionary Class Self-Defense | -- Political A bomb exploded outside the Ministry of Labour and a bank. The responsibility for the attack was claimed by a new organisation called 'Revolutionary Class Self-Defense'. |
| 11 April 2025 | Athens | - | - | Bombing | Revolutionary Class Self-Defense | -- Political A bomb exploded outside the offices of Hellenic Train, Greece's main railway company. No casualties were reported and the responsibility for the attack was claimed by the group 'Revolutionary Class Self-Defense'. |
| 1 July 2026 | Thessaloniki | 1 | 4 | Improvised Explosive Device | Uknown | -- Political Unknown coordinated arson attacks that targeted homes and property linked to three officials from Greece’s conservative New Democracy party in Thessaloniki leave 1 person killed and 4 injured. |

== See also ==
- Terrorism in Europe
- Islamic terrorism in Europe
- List of terrorist incidents
- Terrorism in the United States
- Hindu terrorism
  - Violence against Christians in India
- Left-wing terrorism
- Right-wing terrorism

== Sources ==
Books

- Close, David H. (2014). Greece since 1945: Politics, Economy and Society. London & New York: Taylor & Francis. ISBN 978-1-317-88001-1.
- Kaplan, Robert D. (1994). Balkan Ghosts, A Journey Through History. London: Vintage Books. ISBN 0-679-74981-0.
- Kelly, Luke (2021). "Threats to civilian aviation since 1975". K4D Helpdesk Report. Brighton: UK: Institute of Development Studies. doi:10.19088/K4D.2021.019.
- Koliopoulos, John S.; Veremis, Thanos M. [in Greek] (2009). Modern Greece A History Since 1821. Oxford: Wiley-Blackwell. ISBN 978-1-4443-1483-0.
- Stearns, Monteagle (2021). The enigma of Andreas Papandreou. Sterling: Potomac Books. ISBN 978-1-64012-329-8.
- Stergiou, Andreas (2021). Greece's Ostpolitik Dealing With the 'Devil'. Cham: Springer International Publishing. ISBN 978-3-030-61129-3.

Journals

- Borgeas, Andreas (2016). "The Evolution of Greece's Security Legislation and Policy". Journal of International and Comparative Law. 3 (2): 161–208.
- Kassimeris, George (1993). "The Greek state response to terrorism". Terrorism and Political Violence. 5 (4): 288–310. doi:10.1080/09546559308427230.
- —————— (2001). "Europe's Last Red Terrorists: The Revolutionary Organization 17 November, 1975–2000". Terrorism and Political Violence. 13 (2): 67–84. doi:10.1080/09546550109609681.
- —————— (2007). "For a place in history: Explaining Greece's revolutionary organization 17 November" (PDF). Journal of Conflict Studies. 27 (2): 129–145.
- Samatas, Minas (1993). "The Populist Phase of an Underdeveloped Surveillance Society: Political Surveillance in Post-Dictatorial Greece". Journal of the Hellenic Diaspora. 19 (1): 31–70.

Newspapers and magazines

- "Greece grants diplomatic status to P.L.O. Office". The New York Times. 17 December 1981. p. 6.
- Marlise Simons (27 September 1989). "Greek lawmaker is slain in Athens". The New York Times.
- "Papandreou Trial a Modern Drama". Chicago Tribune. 5 October 1989.
- Emmanouela Seiradaki (24 August 2011). "Colonel Gadhafi Greek bonds". Greek Reporter.
