= Cyber Crime Unit (Hellenic Police) =

Electronic crime unit of Greece

Cybercrime Prosecution Division Διεύθυνση Δίωξης Κυβερνοεγκλήματος
- Abbreviation: ΔΙ.ΔΙ.Κ.

Agency overview
- Formed: 3 March 2004; 22 years ago
- Preceding agencies: Cyber Crime Prosecution Division; Cyber Crime Prosecution Subdivision; Cyber Crime Prosecution Unit

Jurisdictional structure
- National agency: Greece
- Operations jurisdiction: Greece
- Governing body: Government of Greece
- Constituting instruments: Law 5187/21-3-2025, Article 51; Presidential Decree 82/23-9-2020, Article 31; Law 4249/24-3-2014, Section 2, Article 17; Presidential Decree 9/21-2-2011; Presidential Decree 100/3-3-2004
- General nature: Civilian police

Operational structure
- Overseen by: Ministry of Citizen Protection
- Headquarters: Athens, Greece
- Parent agency: Hellenic Police

Website
- cyberalert.gr

The Cyber Crime Unit (Greek: Τμήμα Δίωξης Ηλεκτρονικού Εγκλήματος; which can be literally translated as Electronic Crime Prosecution Unit or roughly Cyber Crime Prosecution Unit) of the Hellenic Police, for which legislative responsibility remains with the Ministry of Citizen Protection, was officially founded in 2004 with Greek Presidential Decree 100/2004 Government Gazette 69/Α/3-3-2004. In 2011 with Presidential Decree 9/2011 Government Gazette 24/Α/21-2-2011 was the establishment of the Authority of Financial Police and Cyber Crime Subdivision (Υπηρεσία Οικονομικής Αστυνομίας και Δίωξης Ηλεκτρονικού Εγκλήματος - ΥΠ.Ο.Α.Δ.Η.Ε.), of Police Directorate level, commenced operation in August 2011 comprises the Financial Police Subdivision and the Cyber Crime Subdivision. It was reformed in 2014 with Article 17 of Section 2 of Law 4249/2014 Government Gazette 73/Α/24-3-2014 in which renamed Electronic Crime Prosecution Division (Greek: Διεύθυνση Δίωξης Ηλεκτρονικού Εγκλήματος - ΔΙ.Δ.Η.Ε.), also well known as Cyber Crime Division (DI.D.I.E.), including the foundation and structure of Cyber Crime Subdivision of Northern Greece in Thessaloniki. The legislation for the Cyber Crime Division has amended with the Article 31 of the Presidential Decree 82/2020 Government Gazette 183/A/23-9-2020.

With the Article 51 of the Law 5187/2025 Government Gazette 48/A/21-3-2025 it renamed Cybercrime Prosecution Division (DI.DI.K.) (Greek: Διεύθυνση Δίωξης Κυβερνοεγκλήματος - ΔΙ.ΔΙ.Κ.), also well known as Cybercrime Division, and its branch renamed Cybercrime Prosecution Subdivision of Northern Greece (Υποδιεύθυνση Δίωξης Κυβερνοεγκλήματος Βορείου Ελλάδας - Υ.ΔΙ.Κ.Β.Ε.) in Thessaloniki. Although it is still continues to be commonly known to as Cyber Crime Unit or Cyber Crime Center.

== History ==
Cyber crime law enforcement part of the Hellenic Police was introduced in 1995 in the line of duty carried out by police officers with information technology skills, among whom there was then police officer Manolis Sfakianakis who would later be appointed the first Head of the Cyber Crime Unit commenced in the Head’s post in the time of Unit's founding on 3 March 2004 renewing the term of office until 17 February 2016, following the appointment in of George Papaprodromou as the next Head from 27 May 2016 to 2 November 2018.

The Cyber Crime Unit initially acquired IT equipments funded by private individual sponsors and consisted of around four police officers where it has since been staffed by personnel around eighty covering different competencies including civilian personnel qualified with university degree and postgraduate studies. In the context of education to its officials, it has provided programmes of training and certification services at various times, such as the programmes CEH (Certified Ethical Hacker) and CISA (Certified Information Security Auditor), of the act Cyber Crime Division Personnel Training, of the Operational Programme Public Sector Reform 2014–2020.

== Sectors ==
The Office of the Public Prosecutor of Supreme Civil and Criminal Court of Greece (Court of Cassation; Areios Pagos) has been issued Encyclical 02/2019 on 22 May 2019 sets out the Cyber Crime Division’s terms of service and area of responsibility aimed specifically at what cases must submit to Cyber Crime Division. As of January 2020, the Cyber Crime Division in Athens, and alongside its branch the Cyber Crime Subdivision at the Northern Greece in Thessaloniki, operating 24/7 service is further divided into five Departments:

- 1. Department of Administrative Support and Information Management
- 2. Department of Innovative Actions and Strategy
- 3. Department of Electronic and Telephone Communication Security and Protection of Software and Intellectual Property Rights
- 4. Department of Minors Internet Protection and Digital Investigation
- 5. Department of Special Cases and Internet Economic Crimes Prosecution

== Services ==
Cybercrime Prosecution Division is hosted by the Attica General Police Directorate (GADA) at its headquarters in Athens

It has resolved a large number of fraud cases, extortion and child abuse, while several resolved cases were only partially committed in Greece. The Unit has intervened in a number of suicide attempts.

In addition, the Cyber Crime Unit was launched a mobile app called Cyberkid accompanied with its respective website, funded through private sponsorship by the Wind Hellas providing useful information to internet users, especially children, parents, legal guardians, using the internet. The Cyberkid app for portable devices (smartphone, tablet) is available for free download from the Google Play, App Store and Microsoft Store that users can directly contact the Cyber Crime Division in the event of a cyber crime incident. The Cyber Crime Unit has organized a series of tele-conferences and a number of event days delivered a lecture and informative presentation open to the public in various locations across the Greece to showcase crucial cyber matters and dangers of internet.

It was also co-organized together with the competence authorities the annual Conference of Safe Cyber Navigation in Athens funded by various sponsors, having simultaneously live streaming, with the first conference was held on 8 February 2012 honoring the Safer Internet Day (SID). On 10 November 2022 a Memorandum of Cooperation has been signed between Hellenic Police and Foundation for Research & Technology – Hellas (FORTH). The Cybercrime Division operates a website called CyberAlert, and also the National Cybersecurity Authority (NCSA) (Εθνική Αρχή Κυβερνοασφάλειας - ΕΑΚ) of Greece operates a website.

Citizens can contact, either giving their name or anonymously, with the Cybercrime Division headquarters in Athens and its branch in Thessaloniki in order to report internet attacks, crimes or complaints, requiring police intervention. Hellenic Police’s Cyber Crime Division’s published official methods of contact are:

- 1. By in-person visiting 24/7 at Cybercrime Division headquarters in Athens and its branch in Thessaloniki, or at any Hellenic Police’s local police station (precinct)
- 2. By telephone number calling on: 11188 available 24/7 (free of charge)
- 3. By fax
- 4. By post
- 5. By sending an email
- 6. By sending a message via Cybercrime Division’s Cyberkid mobile app
- 7. By sending a X message to the Cybercrime Division’s X (former Twitter) verified account (@CyberAlertGR).
- 8. Citizens can also file a cyber crime complaint online through the government portal gov.gr, using their personal account codes of the tax authorities’ Taxisnet service, in accordance with 1) offenses against minors through internet, 2) financial cybercrime involving electronic/digital currencies, 3) breach of privacy of electronic and telephone communications, 4) illegal sharing of audio-visual works through internet, 5) illegal access to computer, 6) cases of fraud with computer.

According to the National Administrative Procedures Policy, complaints from consumers, either giving their name or anonymously, can also be made on the platform (kataggelies.mindev.gov.gr) of the General Secretariat of Trade and Consumer Protection of the Ministry of Development and Investment, launched on 11 January 2023, concerning infringements within Greece, within the European Union or even outside the EU. It offers a choice of different categories, such as personal data protection, consumer goods, services, banking services, and others.

== Controversies ==
=== Incident report via Twitter ===
Cybercrime Division has written on many of its announcements and press releases that it is recalled that citizens can contact, anonymously or by name, with the Cyber Crime Division in order to provide information or to report illegal or offensive acts or activities committed through internet to the following contact details, where among these means the Cyber Crime Division’s Twitter verified account (@CyberAlertGR) is included:

- Telephonically: 11188
- Sending email at: (official email of Cybercrime Division)
- Via the web gateway (portal) of the Hellenic Police (portal.astynomia.gr)
- Via mobile application for smartphones: CYBERΚΙD
- Via X (former Twitter): @CyberAlertGR

Submitting to the police authorities, or other government prosecution authorities, anyone crime or illegal act or minor offence reports via social networking sites (such as X - former Twitter) it could pose privacy risks and also might not be treated your content as confidential allowing your personal information may be disclosed to outside third parties.

=== Violation of EU Directive ===
Since their launch, and as of 2024 onwards, the Hellenic Police’s Cybercrime Division’s official websites cyberalert (cyberalert.gr) and cyberkid (cyberkid.gov.gr) do not have Terms of use and Privacy policy information available, and for their online operation do not have the accessibility features and applications set by Greek law 4727/2020 (Government Gazette 184/A/23-9-2020), Directive (EU) 2016/2102 and Directive (EU) 2019/1024. These violations of law 4727/2020 and EU Directive are against the disabled people and other people with different disabilities too, particularly public sector websites with respect to the what is foreseen for Web Accessibility Directive, Web Content Accessibility Guidelines and digital accessibility. The new edition website of the Hellenic Police (astynomia.gr), has been launched about on 14 December 2022, has digital accessibility application (Userway).

=== Gifts, grants, sponsorships ===
Since its foundation in 2004, Cybercrime Division has received grants, gifts and sponsorships by individuals, public and private companies, with acceptance decisions publicly available on the Ministry of Digital Governance’s online portal Diavgeia (diavgeia.gov.gr), an online public registry of all activities relating to public sector. These are cash money, services, goods, supplies, computer equipments, event expenditures and various others. Such companies include Stavros Niarchos Foundation, Bold Ogilvy, Motor Oil Hellas Corinth Refineries, Diamantis Masoutis, Skroutz Internet Services, Piraeus Bank, Visa Hellas, Eurobank, Wind Hellas, Vodafone, Nova, Forthnet, Cyta, OTE and Cosmote, Aegean Airlines and Olympic Air, Hertz Autohellas, Geitonas private school, Regional Development Fund of Central Macedonia, and others.

=== Lengthy term of office ===
The many years of the term of office of the head of Cyber Crime Division is in question, namely Manolis Sfakianakis whose term of office lasted from 2004 to 2015 about 11 successive years in number, and Vasilis Papakostas whose term of office lasted from 2018 to 2024.

=== Fax machine ===
After 1 January 2021, and as of 2023 onwards, Cybercrime Division and the Hellenic Police continue to publish, on press releases, posts and its official methods of contact, the fax machine for method of contact for the public. With the law 4727/2020 published in the Government Gazette 184/A/23-9-2020 it is abolished since 1 January 2021 the handling of administrative, or not, documents via fax machine from the public, either physical or legal persons or legal entities, to the Public (Government) services of the Public Legal Entities (NPDD) and the organization of local authorities, such as Cybercrime Division and Hellenic Police.

=== Online case report ===
In order to online report a case and provide confidential information tip-off, Cybercrime Division call to contact by sending email message to their email address, whose communication has not have anonymity and online secure protection. Critical communication is subject to a security requirement and strict confidentiality. It can securely send email with encrypted network and specific software tools to preserve secure communication and source anonymity by hiding content and identity online, such as email encryption uses a tailor-made email account with PGP, end-to-end encrypted email and others.

== Awards ==
- On 2 April 2015, the First (Gold) Award in the Best Social and Economic Development App was bestowed on Cyber Crime Division for the Cyberkid Mobile Application funded by the Wind Hellas, from the Mobility Forum & Apps Awards 2015, with the Konstantinos Ouzounis, CEO at Ethos Media S.A., presenting the award to Police Major General Manolis Sfakianakis on behalf of the Cyber Crime Division in a ceremony took place at the Divani Caravel Hotel in Athens. The Cyberkid mobile application is an initiative of Hellenic Police Headquarters with Ministry of Citizen Protection implemented by the Cyber Crime Division.
- On 20 November 2014, the UNICEF Greece 2014 Award was bestowed both on Cyber Crime Division of the Hellenic Police and in its head Manolis Sfakianakis in recognition of their contribution to promote and protect the rights of children in Greece, from the UNICEF’s Greek National Committee Awards 2014 – 25th celebration to commemorate the Declaration of the Rights of the Child, World Children’s Day. The ceremony took place in the Arcade of Book located in the Arsakeion Mansion in Athens.
- On 13 February 2006, an Honorary Distinction (τιμητική διάκριση) was bestowed both on Cyber Crime Unit and in its head in recognition of their valuable social work, from the Ministry of National Education and Religious Affairs, with the Minister Marietta Giannakou presenting the award to Manolis Sfakianakis in a ceremony took place at the General Secretariat for Youth in Athens.
