= AccessiBe =

Israeli technology company

accessiBe
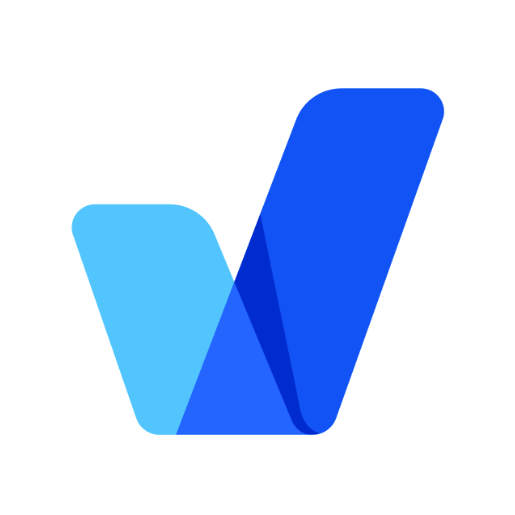
- Type: Private
- Industry: Web accessibility
- Founder: Dekel Skoop, Gal Vizel, Shir Ekerling
- Headquarters: New York, New York
- Products: Web accessibility softwares
- Website: accessibe.com

accessiBe is a technology company working to solve challenges of web accessibility through AI. The company has raised $58 million in two rounds of funding.

== History ==
accessiBe was founded in 2018 by Dekel Skoop, Gal Vizel and Shir Ekerling. The founders worked on developing proprietary software in order to make websites accessible for people with disabilities.

accessiBe launched its flagship product, accessWidget, as a tool that scans and attempts to remediate websites in real-time, attempting to achieve ADA compliance through implementing WCAG 2.1 guidelines. The product claims to make website publishers ADA compliant within hours of deploying accessiBe's code, so that people with disabilities can easily access and interact with these websites. In 2021 accessiBe added to its ecosystem of tools, accessFlow, a testing and remediation platform for developers on the source code level.

=== Fundraising ===
accessiBe first raised $500,000 from private investors including Nadav Dakner, Elad Mor, Itai Elizur, Oron Yaffe. In May 2020, the company raised $12 million in Series A funding from K1 Investment Management. In February 2021, closed its series A funding with $28 million from K1 Investment Management, a Los Angeles-based private equity firm investing primarily in software and technology private companies across North America, took a minority stake in accessiBe Systems Ltd. with intentions to help accessiBe to expand in North America.

By February 2021, accessiBe's annual recurring revenue has shown a growth of more than 3.5x in 12 months, which led to additional funding from K1, totaling $28 million. Company leaders have announced that they are planning to use the funds to significantly expand its US presence, grow its R&D department and continue educating the market on the importance of web accessibility.

In August 2022 accessiBe raised an additional $30 Million as an extension to its previous Series A bringing its total funding to $58 Million.

=== Criticism and concerns ===
Many web accessibility experts agree that accessibility overlay software like AccessiBe can actually cause accessibility issues and create a false sense of accessibility for their clients.

- During their 2021 convention the National Federation of the Blind made resolutions that condemned the use of accessibility overlays as an inadequate solution and described accessiBe's marketing and business practices as "disrespectful and misleading".
- Steve Faulkner, member of the W3C Web Platforms Working Group, says accessibility plugins can't fix fundamental issues or replicate existing browser functionality.
- Haben Girma, disability rights lawyer, author, and speaker, urges companies to stay away from accessiBe and other companies in the same space.

Many industry professionals have criticized the entire product category.

=== Lawsuits ===
In January 2025, the US Federal Trade Commission ordered accessiBe to pay $1 million (subject to a thirty day finalisation period) due to misrepresentation that its software could make any website compliant with WCAG, and ordered it to stop making any such claims. It also ordered accessiBe to make clear any material connection reviewers and endorsers have to their products.

== See also ==
- Start-up Nation
- Userway
- Israeli technology
