= Special Violent Crime Squad (Greece) =

Counter-terrorist law enforcement agency

Directorate for Combating Special Violent Crimes Διεύθυνση Αντιμετόπισης Ειδικών Εγκλημάτων Βίας Diévthinsi Antimetópisis Eidikón Egklimáton Vías
- Common name: Antiterrorist Unit (gr. Αντιτρομοκρατική)
- Abbreviation: (gr. ΔΑΕΕΒ – en. SCVD)

Agency overview
- Formed: 1987; 39 years ago
- Employees: approx. 250 (2002)
- Annual budget: N/A
- Legal personality: Governmental: Government agency

Jurisdictional structure
- National agency (Operations jurisdiction): Greece
- Operations jurisdiction: Greece
- Legal jurisdiction: As per operations jurisdiction
- Governing body: Hellenic Police
- General nature: Civilian police

Operational structure
- Overseen by Overseen by: Chief of Hellenic Police
- Headquarters: Alexandras Ave., Athens, Attica, Greece
- Parent agency: Hellenic Police
- Child agency: Subdirectorate for Combating Special Violent Crimes B'

Facilities
- Offices: Athens, Greece; Thessaloniki, Greece
- Special operations vehicles: approx. 400 (2017)
- Motorcycles: approx. 200 (2017)

Website
- Official Website

The Special Violent Crime Squad, (or Special Violent Crime Division, SVCD) also officially known as Directorate for Combating Special Violent Crimes, is a special service of the Hellenic Police, working in conjunction with regional and other police sectors where necessary. It reports directly to the Chief of Hellenic Police and has territorial juristriction nationwide.

Its mission is combating "special violent crimes", which includes "terrorist and extremist criminal acts, which are directed against the security of the state and democratic rule". It collects and analyses terrorist-related intelligence and is believed to cooperate with the National Intelligence Service (EYP) and the State Security, although due to the secretive nature of these services, this is unknown for certain. The unit was created in 1987 during the government of Andreas Papandreou, when the Chief of police was Nikon Arkoudeas.

It is the only police unit in Greece, which, after obtaining a prosecutor's authorisation, has access to citizens' confidential data. In that regard, it cooperates with fixed and mobile telephone companies, to conduct phone tapping. Although there are time limits for the issuing judicial order, specifically, the Public Prosecutor can submit the application to lift confidentiality to the Council of Appeals which has to decide on the waiving of confidentiality within 48 hours. In exceptional cases in the course of preliminary examinations, or interviews by the Special Violent Crime Squad, the warrant for lifting an individual's confidentiality of communications (and therefore being allowed to conduct wiretapping operations etc.) can be decided by the Public Prosecutor himself.

The SVCD, as is the case for all directorates of the Hellenic Police, is obliged to send all information it collects, to the Intelligence Management and Analysis Division, for the purpose of collecting and analysing information to combat criminal action, especially terrorism, and to update its databases with this newly stored information, collected from the police directories. IMAD is supervised by a public prosecutor.

== Structure ==
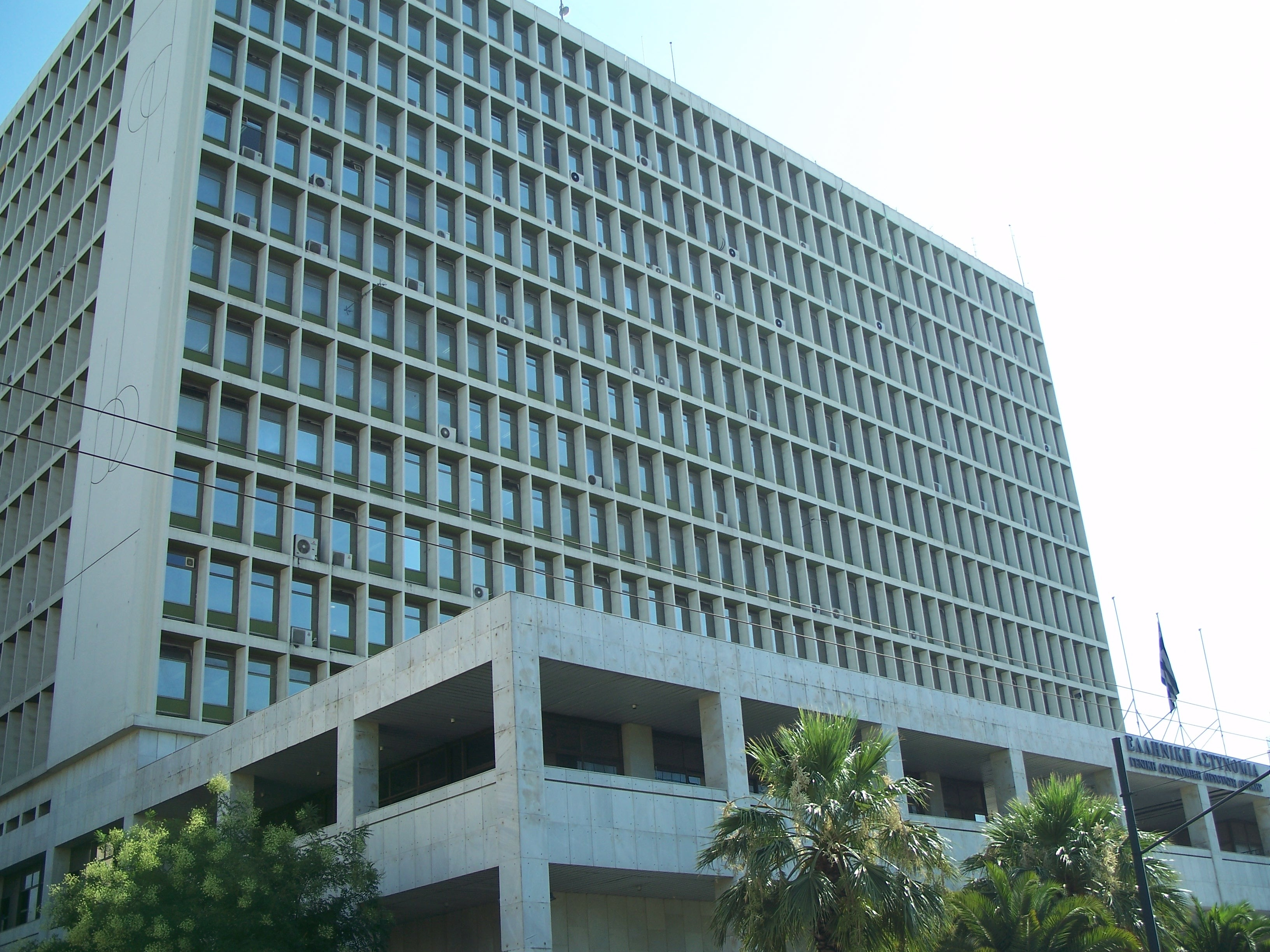
The Headquarters of Attica General Police Directorate, which house the HQ of SVCD.

The SVCD is made up of a Directorate in Athens and a Subdirectorate in Thessaloniki, both of which have similar-functioning Departments. It includes the following:

▶Athens:

- Directorate for Combating Special Violent Crimes (HQ in Alexandras Ave., Athens, Greece – housed in Hellenic Police's Attica Division Headquarters)
  - Department for Combating Internal Terrorism
  - Department for Combating International Terrorism
  - Department for Combating Other Violent Crimes (responsible for dealing with extremist criminal activities)
  - Operations and Controls Department
  - Department of Administrative Support
  - Department of Technical and Network Intelligence Management

▶Thessaloniki:

- Subdirectorate for Combating Special Violent Crimes B' (Offices in Monastiriou Str., Thessaloniki, Greece)
  - Department for Combating Internal Terrorism
  - Department for Combating International Terrorism
  - Department for Combating Other Violent Crimes (responsible for dealing with extremist criminal activities)
  - Operations and Controls Department
  - Department of Administrative Support
  - Department of Technical and Network Intelligence Management

== Action ==
The Antiterrorism Service was responsible for dismantling the guerilla and terrorist organizations of: 17 November and Revolutionary People's Struggle in 2002, Revolutionary Struggle in 2010, as well as arresting many members of the Conspiracy of Fire Nuclei.

== Controversy ==
The service has been heavily criticised for its methods of detainment of suspects during public demonstrations.

Additionally, on 21 December 2012, the security personnel of the Libyan embassy in Athens handed over all their weapons to the SVCD of the Greek police at the suggestion of the Libyan government, however there has been suggestions that this was made at the request of the Greek Foreign Ministry.

According to a report by the Hellenic Authority for Communication Security and Privacy (gr. Αρχή Διασφάλισης του Απορρήτου των Επικοινωνιών - ADAE) for 2022, the Directorate for Combating Special Violent Crimes (SVCD) and the National Intelligence Service (NIS) concealed a total of 6,705 cases of removal of confidentiality protections (telephone surveillance). SVCD itself failed to send to ADAE a total of 5,988 prosecutorial orders relating to the year 2021, something it also did in 2022. In addition, in 2022, both services (SVCD and NIS) delivered a total of 194 court council decisions relating to previous years (2018 to 2021) late, a practice that continued in 2023. In 2,221 of the reports on the lifting of confidentiality sent to ADAE, the information is incomplete (only the number of the prosecutor's order or decision is given).
