= Manolis Sfakianakis =

Greek police officer (born 1963)

- Μανώλης Σφακιανάκης

Assistant to the Chief of Staff of the Hellenic Police Headquarters
- In office 18 February 2016 – 21 January 2017

Head of the Cyber Crime Division of the Hellenic Police
- In office 24 March 2014 – 18 February 2016
- Succeeded by: George Papaprodromou

Head of the Cyber Crime Subdivision of the Hellenic Police
- In office 21 February 2011 – 24 March 2014

Deputy Head of the Authority of Financial Police and Cyber Crime Subdivision of the Hellenic Police
- In office 2 March 2013 – 24 March 2014

Head of the Cyber Crime Unit of the Hellenic Police
- In office 3 March 2004 – 21 February 2011
- Preceded by: Position established

Personal details
- Born: 9 February 1963 (age 63) Crete, Greece
- Children: 1
- Occupation: Police officer

Manolis Sfakianakis (Greek: Μανώλης Σφακιανάκης; born 9 February 1963) is a Greek retired police officer of the Hellenic Police who served as the Head of the Cyber Crime Division (Greek: Δίωξη Ηλεκτρονικού Εγκλήματος) of the Hellenic Police from 2004 to 2016, attaining the rank of Police Lieutenant General (Retired) in 2017.

== Early life ==
Manolis Sfakianakis (or Emmanouil, Manos, Greek: Εμμανουήλ, Μάνος) was born, in Chania, Crete, and was raised in the village of Spilia (Greek: Σπηλιά). He has a sister and a brother. He attended Technical Lyceum of Chania (now the Vocational Lyceum of Chania) with a chosen subject area in electronics, and then enrolled at the private secondary vocational school Korelko (renamed Private IEK Korelko, now-defunct), in Athens in the 2-year program in computer programming. In 1982 he entered into the Enomοtarchon School of the Hellenic Gendarmerie (Greek: Σχολή Ενωμοταρχών Χωροφυλακής, now-defunct) in Rhodes, which was a Non-Commissioned Officers' Academy. After a 10-month program he graduated as Sergeant Major (Greek: Ενωμοτάρχης). Subsequently, from 1986 to 1990, he attended the Officers' School of the Hellenic Police Academy in Athens.

== Career ==
Assignments to the positions include, the Police Department of the village of Salakos in Rhodes island; Police Department of Ialysos in Rhodes; Police Department of Agios Nikolaos, Chalkidiki; Police Security Department of Syntagma in Athens in 1992 where at first he served as the Deputy Director and then from the following year as Director, succeeding the previous Director who dismissed from it; Financial Crime Unit of the Security Directorate of Attica in 1995; Subsequently, he was assigned Head of the Cyber Crime Unit (CCU) in the time of Unit's founding in 2004 hosted in the General Police Directorate of Attica (GADA) and, from then on, he remained to hold that assignment for almost twelve consecutive years.

While in charge of the Unit, he took part in the Unit's 2011 reform when it was upgraded into a Subdivision renamed Cyber Crime Subdivision and later in the 2014 upgraded into a Division changed its name to the Cyber Crime Division in order to full its operational standards in dealing with the aftermath of the technological advancements and greater internet accessibility which has seen a growth in crimes committed over the internet.

Although, since the founding in 2004, it still continues to be colloquially known to as Cyber Crime Unit or Cyber Crime Center. By the time he has promoted to the rank of Brigadier General in a press release of 2 March 2013, he assigned Deputy Head of the Authority of Financial Police and Cyber Crime Subdivision (Υπηρεσία Οικονομικής Αστυνομίας και Δίωξης Ηλεκτρονικού Εγκλήματος - ΥΠ.Ο.Α.Δ.Η.Ε.) where he held concurrently with that of Head of the Cyber Crime Subdivision.

In a press release issued by the Hellenic Police HQ on 18 February 2016 he was assigned Assistant to the Chief of Staff of the Hellenic Police Headquarters where he was responsible to the Chief of Staff Lieutenant General Zacharoula Tsirigoti. In a press release on 21 January 2017 was issued by the Hellenic Police HQ announced that he promoted to the rank of Police Lieutenant General (Retired).

Throughout the years that he has been at the Cyber Crime Unit, the Unit has intervened in a number of suicide attempts. Additionally, on 24 October 2011 the Cyber Crime Unit launched a mobile application, accompanied with its respective website, called CyberKid funded through private sponsorship by the Wind Hellas providing useful information to children and internet users. The CyberKid application for portable devices (smartphone, tablet) is available without charge to download from the Google Play, App Store and Microsoft Store that users can directly contact the Cyber Crime Division in the event of a cyber case incident. The CyberKid mobile application is an initiative of Hellenic Police Headquarters with Ministry of Citizen Protection implemented by the Cyber Crime Division.

== Politics ==
He elected regional councilor of the Region Council of Attica, Municipality of Glyfada at Attica's South Sector Constituency, in the 2023 Greek local elections on 8 October 2023 with the political grouping Attiki Mprosta led by Nikos Hardalias supported by the New Democracy political party. Attica Regional Governor Nikos Hardalias expelled Emmanouil Sfakianakis, regional councilor and executive councilor for internet information and digital service, from his political grouping Attiki Mprosta after Emmanouil Sfakianakis blamed a murdered 28-year-old woman for her killing by her 39-year-old former partner outside Agioi Anargyroi Police Station on 1 April 2024.

== Awards ==
- On 22 December 2015, the Special Award (Greek name: βραβείο άνευ αντιστοίχου προκηρύξεως) of the Class of Ethics and Political Sciences was bestowed on Manolis Sfakianakis in recognition of his contribution and social work to Cyber Crime Division, from the Academy of Athens at its annual awards event. The ceremony took place during the formal sitting in the Great Ceremony Hall of the Academy of Athens.
- On 20 November 2014, the UNICEF Greece 2014 Award was bestowed both on Cyber Crime Division of the Hellenic Police and in its head Manolis Sfakianakis in recognition of their contribution to promote and protect the rights of children in Greece, from the UNICEF's Greek National Committee Awards 2014 – 25th celebration to commemorate the Declaration of the Rights of the Child, World Children's Day. The ceremony took place in the Arcade of Book located in the Arsakeion Mansion in Athens.
- On 13 February 2006, an Honorary Distinction (τιμητική διάκριση) was bestowed both on Cyber Crime Unit and in its head in recognition of their valuable social work, from the Ministry of National Education and Religious Affairs, with the Minister Marietta Giannakou presenting the award to Manolis Sfakianakis in a ceremony took place at the General Secretariat for Youth in Athens.

== Publications ==
Books:

- Emmanouil Sfakianakis, The internet code (Ο κώδικας του διαδικτύου), Athens: All About Internet IKE Publications, 2016, ISBN 978-618-82425-0-0

Co-written books together with others (collective work):

- Emmanouil Sfakianakis, George Floros, Konstantinos Siomos, Psychologist collaborators: Evangelos Makris, Genovefa Christou, Virginia Fyssoun, Addiction to the internet and other high-risk internet behaviour (Εθισμός στο διαδίκτυο και άλλες διαδικτυακές συμπεριφορές υψηλού κινδύνου), Athens: A. A. Livanis Publishing Organization, 2012, ISBN 978-960-14-2501-6, ISBN 960-14-2501-2
- Emmanouil Sfakianakis, Vera Athanasiou, Parents, child, internet (Γονείς, παιδί, διαδίκτυο), Athens: Psichogios Publications, 2017, ISBN 978-618-01-2001-1
- Emmanouil Sfakianakis, Vera Athanasiou, The Ben and tablet-trap (Ο Μπεν και η ταμπλετοπαγίδα), Athens: Psichogios Publications, 2017, ISBN 978-618-01-1995-4
- Emmanouil Sfakianakis, Vera Athanasiou, The Ben and magic screen (Ο Μπεν και η μαγική οθόνη), Athens: Psichogios Publications, 2017, ISBN 978-618-01-1997-8
- Emmanouil Sfakianakis, Vera Athanasiou, The Ben and cyberbullying (Ο Μπεν και το cyberbullying), Athens: Psichogios Publications, 2017, ISBN 978-618-01-1999-2
- Emmanouil Sfakianakis, Ioannis Makripoulias, The keys of internet (Τα κλειδιά του διαδικτύου), Athens: All About Internet IKE Publications, 2016, ISBN 978-618-82425-1-7

== Criticism and controversies ==
=== Supreme Civil and Criminal Court of Greece 305/2019 irrevocable decision ===
The 305/2019 irrevocable decision (Greek: αμετάκλητο βούλευμα) along with its officially documenting release published on its website on 5 November 2018 issued on 15 February 2019 of Z' Criminal Department of Supreme Civil and Criminal Court of Greece (Greek: Άρειος Πάγος), Manolis Sfakianakis was sent to trial accused of having infringed the penal law concerning arbitrary abuse of power charged of a felony offense (Greek: κατάχρηση εξουσίας σε βαθμό κακουργήματος) during was Head of the Cyber Crime Unit of Hellenic Police.

The 305/2019 irrevocable decision on 5 November 2018 taken by judges Aggeliki Aliferopoulou (Αγγελική Αλειφεροπούλου), vice-president of Supreme Civil and Criminal Court of Greece Dimitrios Georgas (Δημήτριος Γεωργάς) and Grigorios Koutsokostas (Γρηγόριος Κουτσοκώστας), with the presence of Deputy Public Prosecutor of Supreme Civil and Criminal Court of Greece Panagiotis Pagou (Παναγιώτης Πάγου) and Secretary Aikaterinis Anagnostopoulou (Αικατερίνης Αναγνωστοπούλου).

The Supreme Civil and Criminal Court of Greece dismissed the appeal of previous referral order of the Judicial Council of Appeal Court Judges (Greek: Συμβούλιο Εφετών) because the court record of the irrevocable decision along by the findings of the investigation showed that Manolis Sfakianakis was implicated in the case appearing to be known, suggested methods, and told journalist Sokratis Giolias 37-year-old about an investigation to be conducted by the Cyber Crime Unit in the coming days at his residence in order to evade criminal charges and remove away his computer devices and any evidence which will be objectively identify who is administrator of Troktiko online journal. Also according to the court record, Manolis Sfakianakis personally had informed Sokratis Giolias for a contract killing against him, based on phone call he had with him on 16 July 2010. The journalist of Proto Thema newspaper, director of Theme 98.9 FM radio station and Troktiko online journal, Sokratis Giolias, was assassinated on 19 July 2010 by gunmen were waiting in ambush shooting him while he was outside of his residence in Athens. On 27 July 2010 in a written statement sent to the Ta Nea newspaper, the terror group "Sect of Revolutionaries" assumed responsibility for the murder. The case remains unsolved with the murderers are still being unknown.

Due to typical bureaucratic reasons and no for substantive, Manolis Sfakianakis wasn't brought to trial for arbitrary abuse of power offense and obstruction of justice, because this criminal charge has removed from the new Criminal Code of Greece on 11 June 2019 with the laws 4619/2019 and 4620/2019 when the Supreme Civil and Criminal Court of Greece had decided before the effective date of the two laws on 1 July 2019, and before the General Election held on 7 July 2019.

Manolis Sfakianakis himself denies any wrongdoing and argued that he does not have any relation with the murder. For a wild hunt against him during the period 2015 to 2019, from persons who still today are preying the sector of public law enforcement, Manolis Sfakianakis addresses, speaking to the Real News newspaper with regard media reports connecting him with the murder of journalist Sokratis Giolias in July 2010. And because, as he states, he has been patient enough to date, he declared "I now intend, to exercise all my legal rights to the Greek courts and European Union courts, while it is unprecedented the continuity development of a criminal case against me with mash data and many exculpatory elements but also the unprecedented my degrading treatment to the public by websites, publications and from false and fabricated complains in which we officially know the details of the authors who apply this atmosphere around me." Manolis Sfakianakis claims that this whole existing because he was an obstacle to their plans. However since 2020, in the aftermath of his initial statement to pursue (but without specifying a time frame or dates) a legal action against certain persons (whose names he declined to disclose, nor he said anything more about them and his upcoming proceedings for all of which he would do), Manolis Sfakianakis nonetheless has not yet been made any legal action and has not yet been proceed with the implementation of this, whatever form this might take, with the Greek courts or European Union courts or with both these courts. It has not been seen in public since any informative announcement nor other statement release in the context of a court consideration. Lawyer Christos Mylonopoulos, legal representative of Manolis Sfakianakis, he stated, "The criminal act in which the principal (Manolis Sfakianakis) is accused of committing a crime it can no longer be tried in court and no longer bring criminal charges because this now has been removed from new Criminal Code of Greece".

=== Transfer to a different term of office (2016–2017) ===
Under the chairmanship of the Chief of the Hellenic Police Lieutenant General Konstantinos Tsouvalas with the participation of two army Lieutenant Generals, has met the Supreme Council of Assessments of the Hellenic Police Headquarters (Ανώτατο Συμβούλιο Κρίσεων του Αρχηγείου της Ελληνικής Αστυνομίας) considered the (22) Major Generals of the Hellenic Police. The 2016 Annual Assessments for Police Major Generals announced in a press release issued by the Hellenic Police Headquarters on 17 February 2016 by which Manolis Sfakianakis retained to the rank of Major General and he will be assigned Head of the Administrative Support and Human Resources Branch at Hellenic Police's Headquarters (Προϊστάμενος, Κλάδος Διοικητικής Υποστήριξης και Ανθρωπίνου Δυναμικού/Αρχηγείο της Ελληνικής Αστυνομίας).

Later the same day following a press release for 2016 Annual Assessments for Brigadier Generals issued by the Hellenic Police's Headquarters on 18 February 2016 on which contained an official announcement stated "it has accepted the action of Manolis Sfakianakis and has been cancelled his assignment at the Administrative Support and Human Resources Branch".

The transfer has attracted intense criticism from a large part of people when was reported in the media with written comments made mostly on Facebook and Twitter. On 18 February 2016, the Members of Parliament Eleftherios Avgenakis (New Democracy), Odysseas Konstantinopoulos (Democratic Coalition), and Georgios Amyras (To Potami) they had submitted a joint question to the Prime Minister Alexis Tsipras, Minister of Interior and Administrative Reconstruction Panagiotis Kourouplis, with a copy thereof to the Alternate Minister of Citizen Protection Nikolaos Toskas, as well as the Member of Parliament Theodoros Karaoglou had submitted a question to the Minister of Interior and Administrative Reconstruction Panagiotis Kourouplis.

On 18 February 2016 the Hellenic Police Headquarters sent a written announcement (ΣΗΜΑ) to Cyber Crime Division, forwarded to a number of officials, in which the 17 February 2016 assignment for Manolis Sfakianakis is rescinded and it has approved the assignment of him to the term of office of Assistant to the Chief of Staff of the Hellenic Police Headquarters (HQ) where it will also be assigned an oversight of the Cyber Crime Division. The vacant position of the Head of the Cyber Crime Division was filled when Police Colonel George Papaprodromou (Γιώργος Παπαπροδρόμου) assigned for the post assumed from 27 May 2016 to 2 November 2018.

On the 21 February 2016 Eleftheros Typos newspaper's article, M. Sfakianakis he commented "If I had not the confidence and support by Prime Minister (Alexis Tsipras), and people's love, they would have already demobilized me. I am an "army staff" but not a "soldier". I am Police Major General, as they done for other colleagues, they should have been notified me in the event of transfer assignment. If they were to do that, I would accept directly the assignment of the Head of the Administrative Support and Human Resources Branch. Why did they call me now? They told me you will be assigned Assistant to the Chief of Staff, and I accepted it without any protest".

In relating to the transfer of Manolis Sfakianakis, stating for the then Ministry of the Interior and Administrative Reconstruction, Alternate Minister of Citizen Protection Nikos Toskas has said "Manolis Sfakianakis has already unduly overdone the tolerance of Hellenic Police with his excessive amount of public media appearances on his own behalf took advantage of his post. In an ordered system it should have no room for conceits. Personal capacity assignments do not exist. No-one can occupy a post over many consecutive years, who not even acquire any ownership right by reason of its prolonged stay at the post. Everyone must respect the rules. But there are other young officers with exceptional knowledge who do not seem and do not have access to mass media. It would be right to offer an access to them. I have absolutely no interest in what political party choice someone is, my concern for police force is that the work must be done. This is not about one person while it should be showcased and valued to all the police members. I am not concerned in the fact if he is accepted the post offered to him. This is standard practice, whether someone agree it or not. M. Sfakianakis has the rank of Police Major General and he could not hold the same post during all ranks because that only post he knows. It is a subject as conformed by Greek police force's hierocracy. Some supporters closest to him in the terms of political expediency they pointing out the unworthily person rather than the worthy [...]", revealed Ministry's dissatisfaction with Manolis Sfakianakis' acts accusing him of obstruction of justice violating the Code of Ethics following he had interfered his remit breached rules. As a result of disciplinary proceedings will be transferred to other position while he maintains his Major General rank.

Nikos Toskas also concluded stating that "there would be no further tolerance in this regard while his self-promotional actions on duty having worsened, the red lines have already been crossed and there conceits cannot be dealt with".

Minister of Interior and Administrative Reconstruction Panagiotis Kouroumblis has stated "I think given to the issue a high emphasis (than what it really is). The assessments it does not detract Mr. Sfakianakis, and because he shall not cease to be an evolving human, to pursue further next year, such a transfer must first be done. The Hellenic Police has its own logic (definite framework of progress by default). If he declines the post offered to him, because he still wants to deal with this objective (cyber crime law enforcement) this is a different matter. Because we have to understand for this particular sector (police force) nobody can be remain permanently in an assignment".

Nonetheless, a one-year later on 21 January 2017, the Supreme Council of Assessments of the Hellenic Police Headquarters at its 2017 Annual Assessments for Major Generals, it decided eventually to discontinue Manolis Sfakianakis from his active duty when it promoted him to the rank of Lieutenant General in the form of retirement.
