= Level Access =

American digital accessibility technology company

- Industry: Digital accessibility
- Founded: 1999; 27 years ago
- Headquarters: Arlington, Virginia, USA
- Key people: Mark Zablan (CEO)
- Owner: Independent (1999–)
- Website: www.levelaccess.com

Level Access is a digital accessibility company based in Arlington, Virginia.

It provides commercial software for testing web accessibility and creating accessible and legally compliant websites, mobile apps, software, and other digital experiences.

== History ==
It was founded in 1999 by engineers with disabilities. The initial business plan for what became Level Access was to build a website for accessible travel so that people with disabilities could go to the site, get information about accessible venues and plan accessible vacations.

In February 2018, Level Access acquired Simply Accessible, Inc., a digital accessibility company headquartered in Ontario, Canada.

In August 2022, Level Access completed its merger with eSSENTIAL Accessibility, the pioneer of Accessibility-as-a-Service.

In January 2024, Level Access acquired UserWay for almost $99 million despite the surrounding controversy of accessibility overlays.

Mark Zablan has been appointed as the chief executive officer of Level Access in October 2024.
