= Foreign policy of Andreas Papandreou =

The foreign policies of Andreas Papandreou during his terms as Prime Minister of Greece (1981–1989 and 1993–1995) marked a significant shift from previous Greek governments, having a strong character of national populism and non-alignment.

Papandreou continued Karamanlis' policy of remaining in the European Union and NATO, both of which he had vehemently opposed for many years. Complementing this political realism, Papandreou's ability to publicly reject American positions gave Greeks a sense of national independence and psychological self-worth. However, in the end, his frequent radical and combative rhetoric frustrated existing allies and did not bring new allies (Arab states or countries from the eastern bloc), leaving Greece more diplomatically isolated and unable to advance a solution on the Cyprus problem.

== Overview and themes ==
Papandreou conducted, as his political party Panhellenic Socialist Movement (PASOK) affiliates touted, an "independent" and "multidimensional" foreign policy; however, even his more vigorous supporters admitted later that these characterizations meant "everything or nothing" due to the frequent inconsistencies and U-turns.

Papandreou's foreign policy had two facets: international relations and domestic consumption. On the former, foreign politicians recognized his 'pragmatic' approach despite the frustration rising from his radical rhetoric and confrontational tactics. On the latter, he often utilized foreign policy by exaggerating (real or not) national dangers to distract the Greeks from a domestic crisis. In the summer of 1982, Papandreou responded to bank employees' general strike "to take into consideration the crucial international crisis facing the nation." Later on, PASOK's poor performance in the municipal elections of 1982 prompted Papandreou to make appearances near Greece's borders as if the country was about to be under attack and appealed to Greek citizens living in the cities to "understand that the main issue that the country is facing is at this moment is defending national integrity."

The rhetoric of Papandreou was that of a Third World populism infused with nationalism aimed against the imperialist forces represented by the United States and the European Economic Community (EEC). The statement that best represents this was "Greece belongs to the Greeks." His position sharply contrasted with Karamanlis' assertion that "Greece belongs to the West," because he was unable to challenge Karamanlis' foreign policy directly. According to political scientist Takis Pappas, Papandreou saw radical polarization and political extremism as the only way to secure his path to power, believing that inflaming divisions within Greek politics would rally support for his cause. Nevertheless, on the most consequential aspects, Papandreou's actions, often contrary to his rhetoric, followed Karamanlis' policy by keeping Greece firmly committed to the North Atlantic Treaty Organization (NATO) alliance and the EEC.

The balance between these two facets has made Greece's foreign policy appear "schizophrenic" to an outsider observer. Historian John Iatrides provided such an example: "while publicly attacking Washington for its interventionist policies, the PASOK government would privately complain that American officials were not sensitive to Greek fears of Turkish intentions concerning Cyprus and the Aegean." Nevertheless, according to Iatrides, Papandreou's nationalistic and confrontational diplomacy had a "therapeutic effect upon the national psyche, as the general [Greek] public came to believe that [Greece's] sovereignty had been restored" since the Greeks largely perceived that their country is pushed around by European Great Powers and now the Americans.

Papandreou's frequent statements antagonizing Western allies made foreign leaders question his intentions, and Greece became more isolated and vulnerable, which did not help resolve the Cyprus question. A notable example was in September 1983, when Papandreou vetoed a formal European Community statement condemning the Soviet government for shooting down the Korean airliner KAL Flight 007, asserting that it was a plane spying for the benefit of the United States, and he added that "if such a plane came into Greece, we would have downed it." Papandreou's siding with the Soviet position effectively eliminated any possibility of visiting the White House under the Reagan administration to advance Greek national interests in the foreseeable future.

== NATO ==
After being sworn in as prime minister in 1981, Papandreou also assumed the Ministry of Defense (a typical move in times of war), due to fears of another coup d'état, as had occurred in 1967. This move also made various leaders in the NATO alliance, particularly Ronald Reagan, Margaret Thatcher, and Helmut Kohl, uncomfortable in dealing with Papandreou. In December 1981, at the NATO Defence Planning Committee, Papandreou demanded, in an acrimonious discussion, NATO guarantees against Turkey, a NATO ally, stating that the true threat to Greece is from the east instead of from the north. The NATO meeting concluded without publishing a press release for the first time. While this displeased Greece's allies, Papandreou reinforced his image as a patriot in the eyes of concerned Greek voters and the Greek military wary of their neighbor. Despite efforts to appease the military, Papandreou struggled with discipline, as two so-called "readiness exercises" in 1982 and 1983, both followed by forced resignations, were likely failed coup d'état attempts.

Papandreou maintained high military spending levels in the 1980s, e.g., at 6.7% of GDP in 1982, pleasing the Greek military at the expense of the economy. In 1985, he bought 40 American F-16 and 40 French Mirage 2000 aircraft at the cost of US$2 billion, committing Greece's defense to long-term dependence on French and American technology. The purchase size was unusual given the status of the Greek economy, and it was described in the press as the "purchase of the century" (Greek: η αγορά του αιώνα).

Despite Papandreou's campaign promise to immediately remove U.S. troops and military bases from Greece once in power, the country remained firmly within NATO. This reversal required careful navigation between domestic expectations—shaped by over a decade of anti-American rhetoric—and geopolitical realities, as removing the bases would have elevated Turkey's strategic value within the NATO alliance. In the 1983 agreement, all four U.S. bases established since 1952 remained in Greece for an additional five years, accompanied by some increased military aid—but no guarantees against Turkish aggression. Papandreou claimed the deal included a provision for base removal after 1988, granted Greece greater control over foreign bases, and secured U.S. military aid under the 7/10 ratio with Turkey. All these statements were inaccurate, but the treaty agreement documents were kept away from the public for nearly two months to sideline the opposition. Afterward, it emerged that the agreement was nearly identical to his predecessor's, except for minor symbolic concessions.

== Arab opening ==
Papandreou continued Karamanlis's opening to Arab countries as part of diversifying diplomatic partners to secure trade deals and investments from petro-dollars countries. He improved relations with 'radical' Arab nations, such as Muammar Gaddafi's Libya, Hafez al-Assad's Syria, and allowed Palestine Liberation Organization (PLO) members stay in Greece, antagonizing the United States. Moreover, Papandreou supported the causes of various national liberation movements worldwide and agreed for Greece to host representative offices of many such organizations. He also supported the Palestinian liberation cause and advocated the two-state solution while at the same time condemning Israeli policies in the occupied territories. However, inviting 'radical' Arab groups in Greece further fueled the rising terrorism incidents in Greece. Moreover, his frequent radical and combative rhetoric frustrated existing allies and did not bring new allies (Arab states or countries from the eastern bloc), leaving Greece more diplomatically isolated and unable to advance a solution to the Cyprus problem.

== Turkey ==
Papandreou often emphasized that the threat to Greece is coming from the east instead of from the north and tried to remind other European members frequently of Turkey's violations of international law and human rights. Moreover, he repeatedly blocked EEC credits for Turkey and its candidacy application for EEC membership in 1987. At the same time, Papandreou made an effort to improve relations with Turkey in Davos.

=== Aegean crisis ===
Greece and Turkey nearly entered into war over a series of miscommunications in late March 1987; Turkey learned that Greece was about to initiate exploration for oil drilling in the Aegean Sea near Thasos, a Greek island in the northern Aegean. In response, the Turkish survey ship Piri Reis (and later the RV MTA Sismik 1) was sent to the area with an escort of Turkish warships, which led both nations to put their military forces on high alert.

Papandreou threatened to sink any Turkish ship found in Greek waters. Turkey's reaction was exaggerated by hard-liners since Turkish Prime Minister Turgut Özal was undergoing open-heart surgery in Houston, Texas. As the situation escalated, the US (particularly Robert V. Keeley, US ambassador in Athens) and NATO intervened to defuse the crisis. Papandreou wanted to hold NATO, and especially the United States, responsible for the Turkish aggressiveness. He ordered the suspension of the operation of the NATO communication base in Nea Makri, and he sent the Greek Foreign Minister, Karolos Papoulias, to the Warsaw Pact member, Bulgaria, for consultations with President Zhivkov.

Seasoned diplomats intervened and successfully resolved the misunderstanding. The crisis ended with Greece not pursuing oil drilling in the northern Aegean Sea and Turkey withdrawing its naval vessels.

=== Rapprochement with Turkey ===
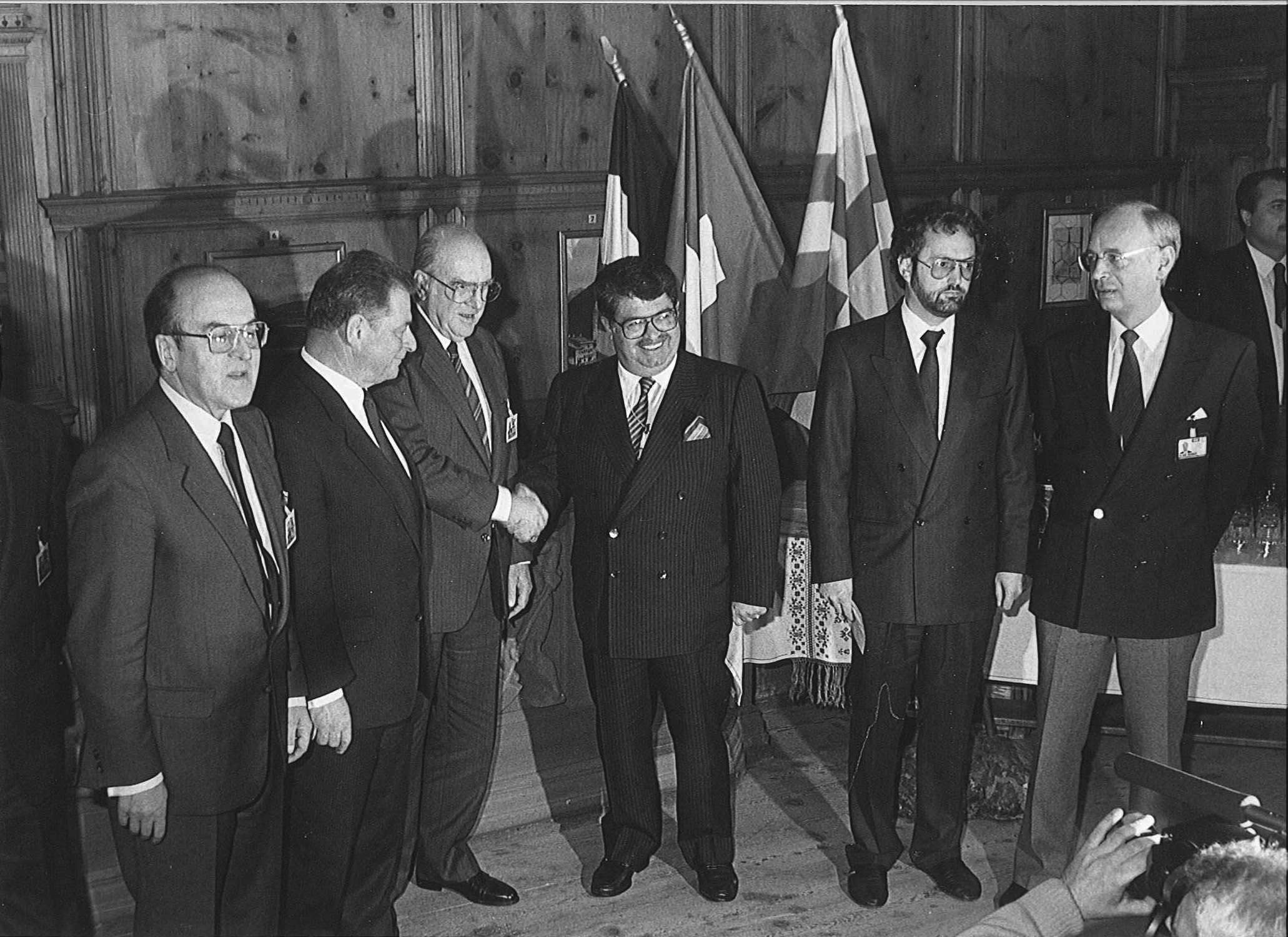
Davos World Economic Forum Annual Meeting 1988 – Handshake between Prime Ministers Andreas Papandreou and Turgut Özal.

In January 1988, Papandreou and his Turkish counterpart, Turgut Özal, met at the annual World Economic Forum at Davos, Switzerland, to improve relations between their two countries. Papandreou described the meeting as "a great event for the two nations" and "a breakthrough" by Özal. Part of the meeting was a 'no war agreement' and establishing a 'hotline' between the two governments, and joint committees were established to work towards closer political and economic relations. Papandreou sought this agreement to improve his image as a man of peace, while Özal wanted to improve Turkey's image abroad as his country was under evaluation for full membership of the European Community.

A week after the Davos meeting, Mitsotakis criticized Papandreou for focusing on bilateral disputes in Davos and effectively "shelving" the Cyprus dispute. Papandreou was forced to denounce the Davos process and famously apologized in Latin ("mea culpa") from the podium of the Greek parliament. Despite some progress achieved on culture exchange and accident prevention over international waters, however, by the end of 1988, Greece reported 338 Turkish violations of the Greek airspace with 42 mock dogfights, vanishing the 'spirit of Davos'.

=== Expansion of territorial waters and Cyprus ===
In October 1993, Papandreou announced the "Common Defence Dogma" with the Republic of Cyprus and the intention of expanding the territorial waters to 12 miles (November 1994), which further disturbed Turkey. In response to Papandreou's declaration that Greece intended to expand to 12 miles, in June 1995, the Turkish Parliament voted for a "casus belli" license, meaning the Turkish government could take any necessary action (including military) if Greece exercised its right (according to Law of the Sea) to expand. These actions increased the chances for another crisis, as it happened at Imia in January 1996, right after the transition of power from Papandreou to Costas Simitis.

== North Macedonia ==
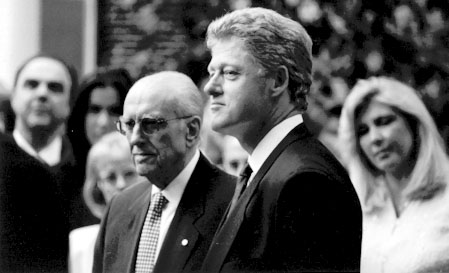
Prime Minister Andreas Papandreou on official visit with United States President William J. Clinton, Washington, April 1994. Dimitra Liani is in the background on the right.

In February 1994, Papandreou ordered an economic embargo on landlocked North Macedonia due to the ongoing naming dispute. In April 1994, Papandreou visited the United States to meet with President Clinton, who had recently recognized the new republic, but failed to make any progress. Papandreou hoped the embargo would have been a bargaining chip, but it backfired because North Macedonia gained considerable sympathy worldwide at the expense of Greece's reputation. In September 1995, an interim accord was signed between the two countries to temporarily address the name issue and end the 18-month embargo.

== Initiative of the Six ==
He was a co-creator in 1982 of, and subsequently an active participant in, a movement promoted by the Parliamentarians for Global Action, the Initiative of the Six, which included, besides the Greek PM, Mexico's president Miguel de la Madrid, Argentina's president Raúl Alfonsín, Sweden's prime minister Olof Palme, Tanzania's president Julius Nyerere and India's prime minister Indira Gandhi. The movement's stated objective was the "promotion of peace and progress for all mankind." Papandreou pledged that Greece would be a nuclear-free country by removing the existing nuclear weapons and initiating diplomatic efforts to turn the Balkans into a nuclear-free zone, but then proceeded to modernize nuclear storage sites in Greece. After various initiatives, mostly directed at pressuring the United States and the Soviet Union to stop nuclear testing and reduce the level of nuclear arms, it eventually disbanded after the US-Soviet rapprochement that was taking place independently of international activities.
