= Assassination of Sokratis Giolias =

2010 murder in Athens, Greece

- Sokratis Giolias
- Location: Athens, Greece
- Date: 19 July 2010 (CET)
- Attack type: Gunshot
- Deaths: 1
- Victim: Sokratis Giolias
- Perpetrator: Sect of Revolutionaries

The assassination of Sokratis Giolias took place on 19 July 2010 when Giolias, a Greek investigative journalist and broadcaster, was shot approximately 15 times at close range outside his home in Ilioupoli, Athens. The identities of the gunmen are unknown, but the weapons used were linked to previous attacks by the Sect of Revolutionaries. Giolias was the first reporter to be murdered in Greece in over 25 years.

== Life and career ==
Sokratis Giolias (Greek: Σωκράτης Γκιόλιας; 13 February 1973 – 19 July 2010) was a Greek investigative journalist, blogger and broadcaster. At the time of his death he was a journalist at Proto Thema (Greece's largest newspaper by circulation), working closely with Themos Anastasiadis its owner. He was the co-founder of the news blog 'Troktiko' according to various sources including a confirmation made by the website following his death, though he had denied this association in his lifetime. The blog became one of the most popular sources of news in Greece. In the wake of the shooting, Troktiko blog went offline, citing security reasons.

According to his colleagues, he had planned to publish the results of an investigation into corruption in the coming days. He was recognizable to the Greek public due to his close association with Makis Triantafyllopoulos, one of Greece's best known investigative journalists. Prior to becoming an investigative journalist, he worked as a sports journalist.

== Threats to journalists ==
While there had been several previous reports of threats against prominent Greek journalists from the various parties vying for power in recent years, including a shooting at the headquarters of Alter TV linked to the Sect of Revolutionaries which caused no injuries, there had never been any direct action taken in furtherance of these threats. After the attack, the group released a statement in which they warned, "Journalists, this time we came to your door, but next time you will find us in your homes."

== Assassination ==
At approximately 5:30 (UTC) on 19 July 2010, three men dressed as security personnel and wearing bullet-proof vests arrived at Sokratis Giolias's residence in the suburbs of Athens. Using the intercom, the men then summoned Giolias out into the street from his home under the pretense that his car was being stolen. Once Giolias stepped outside, the men reportedly opened fire with at least two 9 mm semi-automatic rifles. The group fired a total of 16 shots and according to reports hit him "at least fifteen times" before driving away. He died instantly.

== Investigation ==
In the wake of the shooting, police, after ballistic testing, identified the bullets as being fired by the same guns used by a violent terrorist group called the Sect of Revolutionaries. According to the test results released by the police, both weapons used to kill Giolias had previously been used in the shooting of anti-terrorist policeman Nektarios Savvas, who had been guarding the home of a witness in a terrorism trial in early February 2009.

Police later stated that they were searching for a well-trained, professional team of hit-men composed of approximately three men posing as security agents. The getaway car used by the gang was later discovered abandoned and burned in a different section of the neighborhood where the shooting took place.

=== Supreme Civil and Criminal Court of Greece 305/2019 irrevocable decision ===
According to the 305/2019 irrevocable decision on 5 November 2018, issued on 15 February 2019 of Z’ Criminal Department of Supreme Civil and Criminal Court of Greece (Areios Pagos), Manolis Sfakianakis was sent to trial accused of having infringed the penal law concerning arbitrary abuse of power charged of a felony offense during was head of the Cyber Crime Unit of Hellenic Police. The 305/2019 irrevocable decision on 5 November 2018 was taken by judges Aggeliki Aliferopoulou, vice-president of Supreme Civil and Criminal Court of Greece Dimitrios Georgas and Grigorios Koutsokostas, with the presence of Deputy Public Prosecutor of Supreme Civil and Criminal Court of Greece Panagiotis Pagou and Secretary Aikaterinis Anagnostopoulou.

The Supreme Civil and Criminal Court of Greece dismissed the appeal of previous referral order of the Judicial Council of Appeal Court Judges because the court record of the irrevocable decision along by the findings of the investigation showed that Manolis Sfakianakis was implicated in the case appearing to be known, suggested methods, and had informed Sokratis Giolias that an investigation to be conducted by the Cyber Crime Unit of the Hellenic Police in the coming days at his residence in order to evade criminal charges and remove away his computer devices and any evidence which will be objectively identify who is administrator of Troktiko website. According to the court record, Manolis Sfakianakis had personally informed Sokratis Giolias for a contract killing against him, based on phone call conversation he had with him on 16 July 2010.

Due to typical bureaucratic reasons Manolis Sfakianakis was not brought to trial, because this type of criminal charge was removed from the new Criminal Code of Greece on 11 June 2019, with the law 4619/2019. and 4620/2019 The Supreme Civil and Criminal Court of Greece had decided before the effective date of the two laws on 1 July 2019.

Manolis Sfakianakis himself denies any involvement, and has argued that he has no relation to this murder. Manolis Sfakianakis has spoken to the newspaper Realnews about a wild hunt against him during the period 2015 to 2019, from persons who are still on the sector of public law enforcement. In regard to media reports linking him with the murder of Giolias in July 2010. As he states, he has been patient enough to date. He declared "I now intend, to exercise all my legal rights to the Greek courts and European Union courts, while it is unprecedented the continuity development of a criminal case against me with mash data and many exculpatory elements but also the unprecedented my degrading treatment to the public by websites, publications and from false and fabricated complains in which we officially know the details of the authors who apply this atmosphere around me." Manolis Sfakianakis claims that this whole existing because he was an obstacle to their plans.

Manolis Sfakianakis nonetheless has not yet made any legal action, with either the Greek courts or European Union courts. No further announcements concerning his plans were made.

The lawyer Christos Mylonopoulos, legal representative of Manolis Sfakianakis, stated that "The criminal act in which the principal (Manolis Sfakianakis) is accused of committing a crime it can no longer be tried in court and no longer bring criminal charges because this now has been removed from new Criminal Code of Greece."

== Reaction ==
In response to the shooting, Speaker of the Hellenic Parliament Philippos Petsalnikos gave an interview in which he expressed his "outrage and grief at this heinous and murderous act". This was followed shortly by government spokesman Giorgos Petalotis who held a press conference where he stated that, "Democracy and freedom of speech cannot be gagged, terrorized or intimidated. The Government unreservedly condemns this cowardly and cold-blooded murder."

The Organization for Security and Co-operation in Europe (OSCE) released a statement of their own shortly after the shooting in which it "ask[ed] the Greek authorities to ensure that this murder will be investigated quickly and thoroughly and that the public be informed of its progress continuously." The group also expressed their hope "that those responsible for this horrific murder will be brought swiftly to justice."

On 24 July 2010, the Troktiko blog announced that it was to suspend its activities online indefinitely in response to the assassination, the note read

Goodnight Greece, the birthplace of democracy has ended up killing the freedom of expression.
Sokratis, we wish you well and hope you're watching over us.

== See also ==
- Terrorism in the European Union
- List of journalists killed in Europe
