= Skai TV Bombing =

2018 terrorist incident in Greece

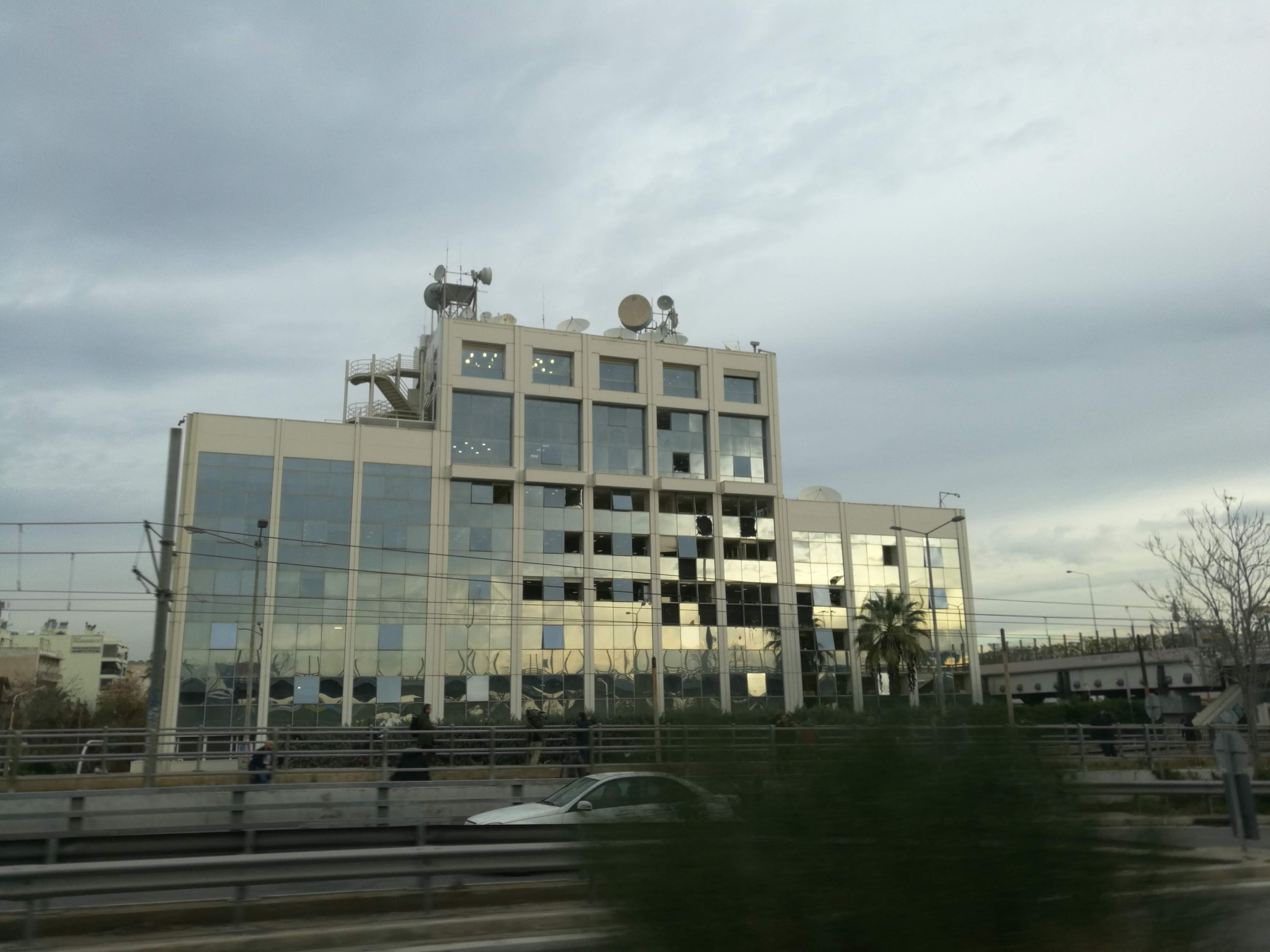
- Skai Headquarters, 6 hours after the attack

- Location: Neo Phalero, Peiraeus, Greece
- Date: December 16, 2018; 2:37 (Eastern European Time)
- Attack type: Bombing
- Perpetrator: Popular Fighters Group

The Skai TV bombing was a terrorist attack against the headquarters of Skai TV and the newspaper Kathimerini that took place on 17 December 2018 in Neo Phalero, Greece.

Responsible for the attack was the left-wing terrorist group, Popular Fighters Group.

== Background ==
Greece has experienced a series of attacks by leftist and anarchist guerrillas for more than forty years. Two of the notorious terrorist groups, Revolutionary Organization 17 November (17N) and Revolutionary Popular Struggle (ELA). In recent years have been several attacks with explosives and guns against Greek government institutions, shopping malls, banks, media offices, diplomatic premises and police headquarters.

== Attack ==
At approximately 2:35, attackers left a homemade explosive at the Skai TV facilities, moments before the attackers made a couple of calls to two media companies. The bomb blasts 45 minutes after the warning calls, Thanks to the calls and the hour provided the reason for which there were no injuries, authorities said.

Hours later of the attack was condemned by Reporters Without Borders and the Greek government condemns the attack said that the "attack by cowardly and dark forces against democracy itself", On January 9, the OLA claimed the attack against Skai TV, accused media of being a tool to strengthen "rotting economic and political system".
