= Revolutionary People's Struggle =

Greek far-left terrorist organization, 1975–1995

- Dates active: 1975–1995
- Active regions: Greece
- Ideology: Anti-capitalism; Anti-imperialism
- Status: Inactive
- Size: Unknown

Revolutionary People's Struggle (Greek: Επαναστατικός Λαϊκός Αγώνας), abbreviated ELA (ΕΛΑ), was a Greek far-left urban guerrilla organization formed in 1975 and disbanded in 1995. It was described as the largest terrorist organization in Greece. ELA was one of the two most important terrorist organizations in Greece; the other was the Revolutionary Organization 17 November.

== History ==
Since 1975 ELA has carried out bombings against political, state, economic and foreign targets. ELA had been presented as having connections with other terrorist groups and also as using other minor groups for more violent activities. The group worked with other guerrilla called 1 May Group. On January 23 The Supreme Court Assistant Prosecutor Anastasios Vernardos, 61, was shot dead by a gunman on motorcycle in the downtown of Athens, later an underground group calling itself '1 May Group' claimed responsibility in leaflets found at the scene. Months later the group claimed the assassination of owner of a cafeteria belonging to Panayiotis Vasiliou.

After a hiatus of several months, the group claimed two bombs that did not detonate, on November 10, in Athens. The April 3 the ELA, and 1 May group, claimed bombings against the General Federation of Greek Workers, the Ministry of Economist and a United Nations offices. On July 16, four bombs blast against Life Insurance offices in Athens, 1 May and ELA claimed responsibility for the attacks, as well as other bombing in the city of Thessaloniki. The last attack of 1 May group were on March 17, 1992, claiming a ring of attacks in Athens

ELA announced its disbandment in 1995, after a political decision.

== Members ==
- Costas Agapiou
- Christos Tsoutsouvis (ex member) - killed in 15 May 1985 shootout with police

== See also ==
- Revolutionary Organization 17 November
- Revolutionary Nuclei
- Revolutionary Struggle
