= Skroutz =

Greek online marketplace

- Website type: Marketplace
- Founded: 2005; 21 years ago
- Headquarters: Nea Ionia, Greece
- Area served: Europe
- Key people: George Chatzigeorgiou (co-founder, president, CEO); George Avgoustidis (co-founder, vice president); Vasilis Dimos (co-founder, board member)
- Website: skroutz.gr
- Current status: Active

Skroutz (pronounced "Scrooge") is a Greek online marketplace, originally founded as a price comparison website in 2005 by George Chatzigeorgiou, George Avgoustidis, and Vasilis Dimos. Chatzigeorgiou serves as president and CEO of the company, Avgoustidis as vice president, and Dimos as a board member. Its headquarters are located in Nea Ionia. The name "Skroutz" is inspired by Scrooge McDuck, a Disney character known for his reluctance to spend large amounts of money.

As of June 2025, according to Similarweb, Skroutz was the most-visited online marketplace in Greece and overall the fifth-most-visited website in the country. It started shipping to other member states of the eurozone in 2023, followed within the same year by countries outside the monetary union such as Bulgaria, the Czech Republic, Hungary, Poland, Romania, and Sweden.
