= 1991 Patras bombing =

Terrorist attack in Patras, Greece

- Location: 38.2461°N 21.7320°E; Patras, Greece
- Date: 19 April 1991
- Target: British consulate (intended); Apartment building at Votsi Street, 14 (actual)
- Attack type: Bombing
- Weapon: Dynamite
- Deaths: 7 (6 citizens, 1 terrorist)
- Perpetrators: Ibrahim Hasikeh; Asar Al Nobani; Baykarat Khalil, Awad Khalil
- Convictions: Asar Al Nobani (25 years in prison); Baykarat Khalil (25 years in prison); Awad Khalil (3 years in prison)
- Convicted: Asar Al Nobani, Baykarat Khalil, Awad Khalil

The 1991 Patras bombing was a terrorist attack carried out on 19 April 1991 in the centre of Patras, Greece, killing six citizens and the terrorist who was carrying the bomb.

== Attack and victims ==
The bomb was carried by Ibrahim Hasikeh, a 26 year old Palestinian terrorist, who allegedly belonged to a group linked to Abu Nidal's network. The target of Hasikeh is believed to be the British consulate, at the junction of Votsi and Othonos Amalias streets. But Hasikeh, either because he wanted to do a final check of the explosive device or because there were people in the consulate who might suspect him or due to some mishandling of the bomb, entered the apartment building on Votsi Street, 14, and headed to the elevator. There, probably trying to change the time of the bomb's explosion, which consisted of 11 kilograms of dynamite, the bomb exploded dismembering Hasikeh and killing six people who were in a company courier on the ground floor of the apartment building. Outside the building was waiting Hasikeh accomplice, Asar Al Nobani, 29, who disappeared after the explosion.

The six citizens who were killed due to the explosion were: George Papasotiropoulos, 58, Vassilis Kyriakopoulos, 53, Yannis Kavkas, 25, Olga Stagalinou, 25, Dimitris Seitanidis, 23, and Georgia Verra, 24.

== Prosecutions ==
Police officers who checked the debris after the explosion found pieces of the Hasikeh student ID and one of his shoes and soon managed to identify him. A few days later they arrested Al Nobani and two other Palestinians, Baykarat and Awad Khalil. In the autumn of 1995, Al Nobani and Baykarat Khalil were sentenced to 25 years in prison while Awad Khalil in three years. The court also ordered their immediate deportation after serving their sentences.

== Memorial ==
Every year on 19 April, a memorial service is held in Patras for the six dead from the bomb explosion on Votsi Street.
