= Christos Tsoutsouvis =

Greek far-left militant

Christos Tsoutsouvis (Greek: Χρήστος Τσουτσουβής; 1953, Agios Vasileios – 15 May 1985, Athens) was a Greek far-left militant, or "urban guerilla" fighter.

Tsoutsouvis was killed in 1985 during an exchange of fire with police officers.

== Biography ==
Christos Tsoutsouvis was born in 1953 in Agios Vasileios, Greece. During studies in Graz in Austria Tsoutsouvis became a member of anti-dictatorial movement PAK. After the fall of the dictatorship he was a represantive of the PASOK political party in the elections of 1974. Afterwards he joined far-left urban guerrilla organization Revolutionary People's Struggle (ELA) and participated in many armed actions. Tsoutsouvis left ELA in 1980 and founded his own group named the Anti-State Struggle (Greek: Αντικρατική Πάλη). The Anti-State Struggle was to claim responsibility for the killing of prosecutor Giorgos Theofanopoulos on 1 April 1985.

Greek Minister of Public Order Alexandros Floros stated that the Ministry had evidence that Tsoutsouvis was linked to the Revolutionary Organization 17 November, and Tsoutsouvis' apartment was found to contain an armory of weapons along with "detonators, batteries and wiring for assembling explosive devices, a duplicating machine, equipment for faking license plates and burglary tools." He asserted that Tsoutsouvis and his organization was linked to the murder of District Attorney George Theofanopoulos, shot and killed outside his home in April 1985.

On 15 May 1985 in Gyzi, near central Athens, three police officers investigating recent political murders detected a stolen motorcycle near Tsoutsouvis' apartment building. As they were investigating, Tsoutsouvis and an accomplice opened fire. Three police officers were killed in the exchange. Tsoutsouvis was also killed and his accomplice escaped.

== Legacy ==
=== Christos Tsoutsouvis Revolutionary Organization ===
The left-wing, German terrorist organization, Christos Tsoutsouvis Revolutionary Organization, is named in his honour. Also translates as, Fighting Unit Christos Tsoutsouvis, it is thought to be connected with the Red Army Faction. In 1986 the group bombed the Office for the Protection of the Constitution, West Germany's counterintelligence agency, in Cologne, Germany. In August 1987 the group set off bombs outside a government ministry and a police station in Athens.
