= Gyzi =

Neighborhood of Athens, Greece

Gyzi (Greek: Γκύζη [ˈgi.zi]) is a neighbourhood of Athens, Greece.

== Etymology ==
The area was named around 1925 after famous painter Nikolaos Gyzis. By all rights, the neighbourhood should have been called Γύζη (pronounced [ˈʝi.zi]). However, because he signed his paintings using the Latin alphabet (as he lived in Germany for a time period), this was reabsorbed into the Greek language with the current spelling and pronunciation.

== History and amenities ==
Gyzi was rapidly urbanised during the 1960s and 1970s.

On 15 May 1985 a shootout between Christos Tsoutsouvis (a far-left militant) and one of his accomplices on the one side and the police on the other side took place in the neighbourhood of Gyzi, resulting in four deaths.

The nearest metro stations are Ampelokipi and Panormou (line 3) and Victoria (line 1).

It is popular among Greeks for having a strong base of Panathinaikos fans, one of the most historical Greek athletic clubs. This is mostly due to its geographical proximity to the Leoforos Alexandras Stadium, the traditional home field of Panathinaikos FC. Gyzi used to have a small river, the Vafeiochori, which was situated where Vafeiochoriou street is today. Local teams include Gyziakos, Panellinios and Anagennisi Gkyzi-Polygono. There are two primary schools and four high schools in the area. The neighborhood has many traditional cafes called kafenio.
