= Popular Fighters Group =

Greek left-wing terrorist group

- Dates active: 2013 – 2019
- Active regions: Greece
- Ideology: Anarchist communism Anti-capitalism; Anti-imperialism; Anti-German sentiment Insurrectionary anarchism
- Status: Inactive

The Popular Fighters Group, also referred to as Group of Popular Rebels (Greek: Ομάδα Λαϊκών Αγωνιστών, transliterated as Omáda Laikón Agonistón), was a Greek left-wing terrorist group that was anti-imperialist, anti-capitalist. Formed as a response to the Greek Government-debt crisis the group carried out attacks primarily targeting the Government of Greece and German organizations in Greece.

The group gained attention not only for its attacks, it published several statements explaining its political views. The group usually communicated through statements on anarchist websites or left behind the statements for journalists in public places. According to authorities, the former EA operative Panagiota Roupa allegedly wrote some of the OLA's tractates.

== Attacks ==
=== 2013 ===
- January 14, 2013 - Gunmen attacked the headquarters of the governing New Democracy party in Athens. No one was injured.
- December 30, 2013 - Gunmen fired on the residence of the German ambassador, Wolfgang Dold. No one was injured.

=== 2014 ===
- January 12, 2014 - The group claimed to have fired rocket at the Greek headquarters of Mercedes-Benz in Varympompi, Athens. Greek investigators had not noted such an attack; however, they later discovered evidence that a rocket had indeed been fired but missed its target, instead landing in a nearby field.
- April 10, 2014 - The group is believed to be responsible for a car bombing outside of the headquarters of the Bank of Greece in Athens. No one was hurt in the attack.
- December 12, 2014 - Armed assailants opened fire against the Israeli embassy in Atticia, Athens. leaving only material damage. The Popular Fighters Group claimed the attack weeks later in a statement.

=== 2015 ===
- November 24, 2015 - An improvised device blasts outside the Hellenic Federation of Enterprises (SEV) offices in Atticia, Athens, leaving material damage.

=== 2016 ===
- The Popular Fighters Group (OLA) claimed the bombing against the headquarters of Greece's industrialists in Athens, occurred the last November.

- December 12, 2016 - Members of the Popular Fighters Group (OLA) left an explosive device in the offices of the Labor Ministry in Athens. The bomb was defused by greek authorities.

=== 2017 ===
- April 14, 2017 - Militants blasts a Eurobank branch in Athens, left important material damages. Days later the Popular Fighters Group claimed the attack in an anticapitalist statement.
- December 22, 2017 - the group claimed responsibility for a bombing against the Court of Appeals in Athens. The group press release stated that "Justice is like a snake. It will only bite those barefoot" as justification for the attack. Days later, the OLA claimed the attack in response of sentences received against guerrilla members in the last years.

=== 2018 ===
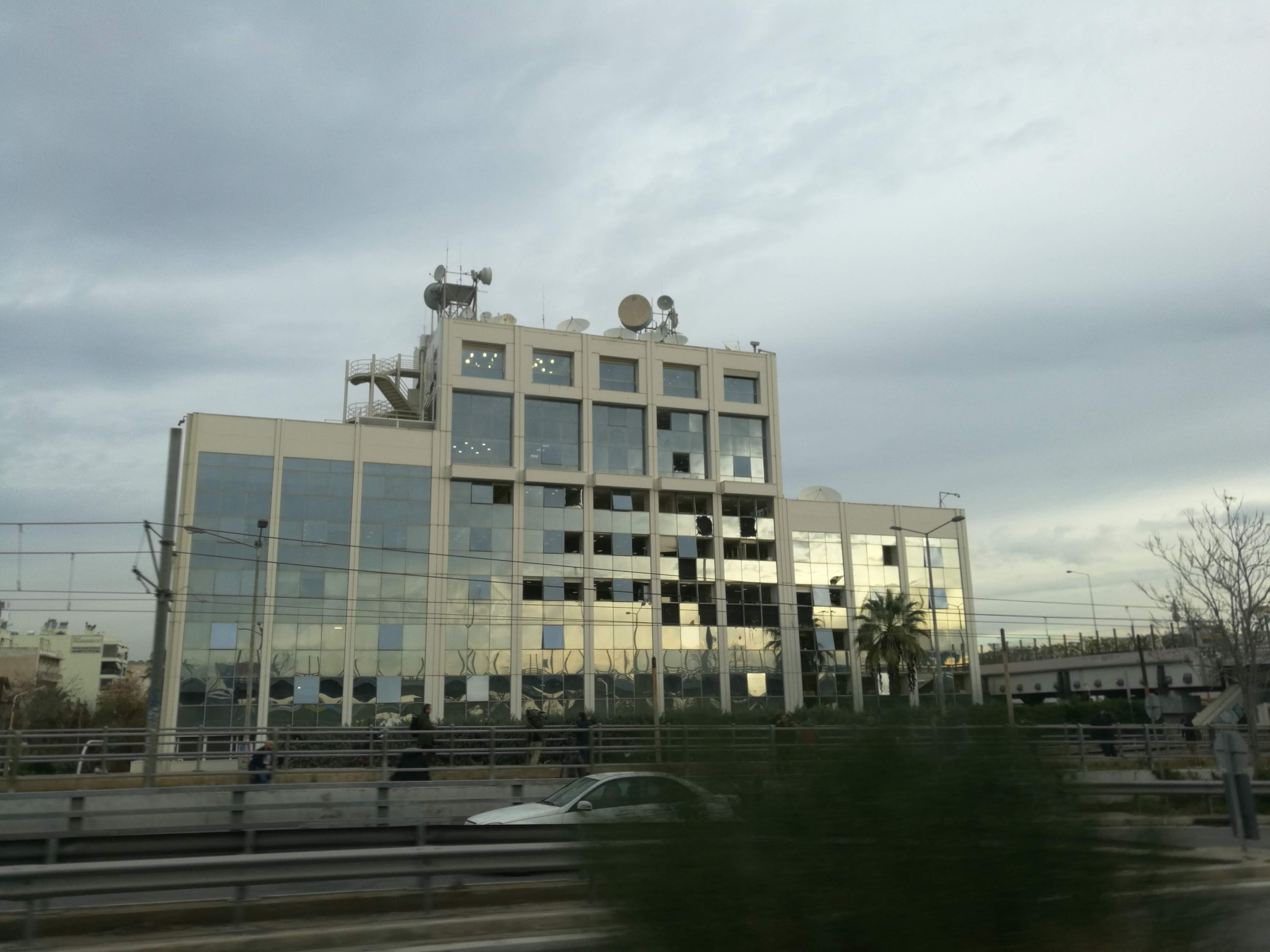
The destroyed headquarters of Skai TV few hours after the attack

- November 13, 2018 - An explosive device failed to blasts in the house of the Supreme Court deputy prosecutor Isidoros Dogiakos in Vyronas, Athens, being defused by greek forces.
- December 17, 2018 Bomb at the Skai TV station and Kathimerini newspaper.

=== 2019 ===
In January, the OLA claimed the attack against Skai TV, accused media of being a tool to strengthen "rotting economic and political system".

== Arrests ==
On September 24, 2020, three suspect members of the OLA were arrested and accused of possession of firearms, explosives and carry out attacks, after an investigation which dated back more than seven months. The raid took place in the neighborhood of Koukaki, Athens.
