= Sect of Revolutionaries =

Greek nihilist-anarchist militant group

- Other name: Rebel Sect
- Dates active: 2009–2011
- Active regions: Greece
- Ideology: Individualist anarchism
- Status: Inactive

The Sect of Revolutionaries or the Rebel Sect (Greek: Σέχτα των Επαναστατών, Sechta ton Epanastaton) was an anarchist militant group which was active in Greece. Formed after the 2008 police killing of Alexis Grigoropoulos, the group killed an anti-terrorist police officer the following year. It also claimed responsibility for the assassination of Sokratis Giolias in 2010. There has not been a reported attack by the Sect of Revolutionaries since 2011.

== History ==
The Sect of Revolutionaries is an anarchist militant group which was active in Greece. The 2008 police killing of Alexis Grigoropoulos, a fifteen year old, unarmed Greek youth, sparked its creation. The group is a leftist, individualist organization that opposes state control. The Sect of Revolutionaries gained prominence after the rise of both the Revolutionary Struggle and the Revolutionary Organization 17 November. The Sect of Revolutionaries is known for targeting police officers especially.

The Sect of Revolutionaries first became known in February 2009 with a communique which was published by the Ta Nea newspaper, threatening to kill Greek police officers at the Police-station in Korydallos and claiming responsibility for shots fired at the station as well as a hand-grenade thrown which failed to explode on 2 February, days before the communique was found. Notably the communique was left on a Compact Disk atop the grave of Alexis Grigoropoulos, teenager killed by the police that preceded the 2008 Greek riots.

There was also a shooting and bomb attack on 17 February 2009 at the headquarters of Alter TV linked to the Sect of Revolutionaries, which caused no injuries.

In June 2009, Sect of Revolutionaries assassinated 41 year old anti-terrorist police officer Nektarios Savvas whilst he was guarding a witness against a member of Revolutionary Struggle. Early morning on Wednesday June 17 Savvas was reportedly shot 15-20 times at close range whilst in his car outside the witnesses home in the Patissia neighborhood of Athens before the unknown attackers fled by motorcycle. There were at around 24 shots fired by at least two guns, according to police. After the attack, the group released a statement in which they warned, "Journalists, this time we came to your door, but next time you will find us in your homes."

In July 2010, the group claimed responsibility for the assassination of journalist Sokratis Giolias in a communique sent to Ta Nea, with the police saying they believed the statement was authentic. The group further stated they sought to "target more policemen, journalists and prison staff", and "aim to transform it [Greece] into a war zone of revolutionary processes, with arson, sabotage, fierce demonstrations, bomb attacks, armed killings". It also assured that "We are at war with your democracy". Along with the communique claiming the Giolias action the group sent photographs of its weapons which reportedly included handguns, Kalashnikov rifles, and a semi-automatic weapon resembling a Škorpion sub-machine gun, police experts reported the weapons were likely trafficked through criminal underworld of the Balkans. Ballistic testing by police after the Giolias assassination reportedly showed that the same firearm was used in the Giolias assassination, the killing of anti-terrorist police officer Nektarios Savvas as well as the attacks on the Korydallos police station and the Alter TV headquarters.

In a summary of the goals of the group, the Sect of Revolutionaries outlined their intent to create "A life of new human relationships, without authority, without borders, without religion, without divisions. A life that money does not govern; neither will property rule. A life away from false idols, compulsions, and conventions." The Sect believes this new life is only possible with the destruction of the state. In February 2011, the United States Department of State designated the Sect of Revolutionaries a terrorist organisation.

The Sect of Revolutionaries claimed no attacks since 2011.

== See also ==
- Anarchism in Greece
