= UserWay =

Israeli technology company

- Company type: Private
- Industry: Digital accessibility
- Founded: 2016; 10 years ago
- Founder: Allon Mason
- Headquarters: Wilmington, Delaware, USA
- Owner: Independent (2016–24); Level Access (2024–present)
- Website: userway.org

UserWay is a digital accessibility company based in Wilmington, Delaware. The company uses AI and automation in response to legal pressure on companies to make their websites accessible.

== History ==
UserWay was founded in 2016 by Allon Mason. In 2021, Susan Bennett, the original voice of Apple's Siri personal assistant, became the company spokesperson and disability advocate for UserWay's promotional campaign which also starred Dr. Orna Guralnik. In December 2021, the company submitted a first draft prospectus for its IPO on the Tel Aviv Stock Exchange.

In January 2022, the company issued its IPO on the Tel Aviv Stock Exchange at a value of 120 million NIS. It went on to raise approximately 30 million NIS from institutional clients. UserWay began trading on the Tel Aviv Stock Exchange under the name UWAY.

UserWay's Accessibility Widget is available for all major CMS platforms as well as plain HTML/CSS/JS sites. UserWay's technology meets compliance laws based on WCAG 2.1 AA standards and as required by the ADA.

In December 2023, UserWay announced that it would be acquired by American firm Level Access at a cost of $98.7 million in a cash deal merger despite the ongoing controversy surrounding overlays. The transaction was completed in March 2024, making the company private once again.

== Misleading claims ==
In 2024, a class action lawsuit was filed against UserWay, alleging that several of its claims were exaggerated, that its widgets didn't ensure compliance and, in some cases, made websites harder to use for people with disabilities. The Financial Times reported that websites using UserWay and other accessibility widget companies are still far from compliant with accessibility regulations, with some of them having basic accessibility errors.
