= Revolutionary Nuclei =

Greek left-wing terrorist group

- Dates active: 1996–2000
- Active regions: Greece
- Ideology: Anarchism
- Status: Inactive
- Size: Unknown

Revolutionary Nuclei (RN; Greek: Επαναστατικοί Πυρήνες, Epanastatikoi Pyrines), also known as Revolutionary Cells, was an armed far-left political group in Greece. The group was responsible for or credibly suspected of committing twelve acts of terrorism between 1996 and 2000. Revolutionary Nuclei was designated as terrorist group by the European Union and the United Kingdom.

== Origins ==
The Revolutionary Nuclei are thought to be the offshoot of a previous terrorist group known as the Revolutionary People's Struggle (ELA). The ELA dissolved in the early 1990s, and the Revolutionary Nuclei emerged in 1995 and remained heavily active through 2000. After a long hiatus, the group was credited with also carrying out an attack in 2009. This group opposed US military occupation and involvement in Greece. Both the Revolutionary Nuclei and its preceding Revolutionary People's Struggle were leftist groups. Both of these leftist terrorist groups opposed capitalism.

The prevalence of left-wing terrorist organizations in Greece is thought to be a backlash to the military rule that prevailed until 1974.

== Claimed Attacks ==
The 1996 attack on Citibank was the first incident credited to the Revolutionary Nuclei. The group was responsible for an attack on a government building in 1997. They were very active in 1998, with three separate incidents. One involved a government target, while the other two were attacks on businesses. The other two occurred on the same day at banks at two different locations.

In 1999, the group launched a deadly attack at the Intercontinental Hotel. Members of the Greek government were attending an Economic Round-table at the hotel. One other person was injured in the course of the attack. Later that same year, the group bombed the office of Texaco in Athens.

The group was most active in 2000, carrying out five attacks. The most notable aspect of these attacks was the use of time bombs. On November 12, three attacks took place across Athens. The Revolutionary Nuclei targeted Barclays Bank and Citibank locations again. No injuries were reported, but the buildings sustained damage. The third attack on that day was against an art studio, which resulted in property damage.

== Weapons ==
The Revolutionary Nuclei made exclusive use of bombs in their terrorist activities. The group is responsible for one casualty and twelve instances of property damage.

== See also ==
- Anarchism in Greece
