= Pola Roupa =

Greek anarchist (b. 1969)

- Πόλα Ρούπα
- Born: Panagiota Roupa; 3 April 1969 (age 57); Kalamata, Peloponnese, Greece
- Organization: Revolutionary Struggle
- Movement: Anarchism in Greece
- Status: Conditional release
- Criminal charges: Terrorism
- Penalty: Life imprisonment
- Accomplice: Nikos Maziotis

Panagiota Roupa (Greek: Παναγιώτα Ρούπα; b. 1969), commonly known by her nickname Pola Roupa (Greek: Πόλα Ρούπα (Note: Also transliterated as Paula Roupa, Paula Rupa or Pola Rupa.)), is a Greek anarchist militant and former leader of the proscribed terrorist organisation Revolutionary Struggle.

== Biography ==
Pola Roupa was born in the Peloponnesian city of Kalamata, in 1969. Her father, a Marxist veteran of the Greek resistance, educated her in left-wing politics from an early age. She enrolled in the University of Athens to study mathematics and became involved in student activism, for which she was arrested in 1991 after she was caught flyposting. Her treatment in police custody radicalised her towards anti-statism.

In November 1995, marking the 22nd anniversary of the Athens Polytechnic uprising, she took part in an occupation of the National Technical University of Athens, during which she met the anarchist militants Nikos Maziotis and Lambros Foundas, with whom she established the nucleus for the armed organisation Revolutionary Struggle (RS). Roupa quickly fell in love with Maziotis, whom she admired for his commitment to revolutionary activism. In 1997, Maziotis attempted to bomb the Ministry of Development, but the bomb didn't explode, and his fingerprints were found on its casing. He was caught and tried in 1999, resulting in him being sentenced to 3 years and 6 months in prison.

Maziotis' release in 2002 coincided with the collapse of the 17 November Group, presenting him and Roupas with an opportunity for their own organisation to make its debut. In September 2003, they set off two bombs at the courthouse of the Hellenic Military Academy during the trial of members of 17N, wounding a police officer. Motivated by its own revolutionary politics — as well as widespread corruption in Greece, police brutality and the ongoing war on terror, among other motives — RS carried out a series of attacks modelled on the earlier activities of 17N, notably firing a rocket-propelled grenade at the Embassy of the United States in 2007 and exploding a car bomb at the Bank of Greece in 2014. During this period, Roupa and Maziotis had a son together; they named him Lambros after their comrade Lambros Foundas, who had been killed in a firefight with police in March 2010.

In April 2010, Roupa and Maziotis were arrested, along with four other members of the RS. Michalis Chrisochoidis confidently declared the effective end of the group, as most of its core membership had been detained. In October 2012, after 18 months in pre-trial detention, Maziotis and Roupa were granted conditional release, which they used to escape, becoming fugitives. In a later interview Maziotis claimed he and Roupa and gone on the run so that they could raise their child together, "without him having to see us behind bars". In July 2014, Maziotis was injured and rearrested after a shootout with the police in Athens. Counter-terrorism police subsequently located the couple's hideout in Marousi, but by the time they raided it, Roupa had already escaped with her four-year-old son. With Maziotis once again in prison and Foundas dead, Roupa became the main leader of the RS. But as she was mainly an ideologue, not a guerrilla like her partner, she faced difficulties regrouping the organisation, aside from having to care for her young child.

On 21 January 2016, Roupa hijacked a helicopter, ordering the pilot at gunpoint to fly over the courtyard of Korydallos Prison, in an attempt to break Maziotis out. But the pilot resisted and landed the helicopter, forcing Roupa to flee. By this time, she was considered by the Greek authorities to be the country's "No. 1 most-wanted domestic terrorist". On 5 January 2017, counter-terrorism police arrested her in the Athenian suburb of Ilioupoli, where she had been living clandestinely with her 6-year-old son, who was taken into protective custody. Her arrest marked the definitive defeat of the RS. At the time of her arrest, she was the first and only woman known to have led a terrorist organisation in Greece.

In April 2021, Roupa's double life sentence of 50 years was commuted to 6 years and 3 months. On 17 November 2023, Roupa was released from prison after serving 5 years of her sentence, having been granted a conditional release as she is the mother of an underaged child.

== Bibliography ==
- Kassimeris, George (2021). "Greece's Ulrike Meinhof: Pola Roupa and the Revolutionary Struggle". Studies in Conflict & Terrorism. 44 (12): 1090–1103. doi:10.1080/1057610X.2019.1620470. hdl:2436/622590. ISSN 1057-610X.
- Magra, Iliana (5 January 2017). "Greece's Most-Wanted Terrorist, on Run Since 2012, Is Arrested and Charged". The New York Times. Archived from the original on 7 January 2017.
