= Revolutionary Struggle =

Greek anarchist urban guerrilla group

- Leader: No leader (non-hierarchical organisation)
- Dates active: 2003–2017
- Active regions: Greece
- Ideology: Anarcho-communism; Platformism; Anti-imperialism; Anti-globalisation
- Status: Inactive
- Size: Unknown

Revolutionary Struggle (Greek: Επαναστατικός Αγώνας, Epanastatikos Agonas), abbreviated EA (ΕΑ), was a Greek anarchist, anti-imperialist, urban guerrilla group known for its attacks on Greek government buildings and the American embassy in Athens. It was designated as a terrorist group by the Greek government, the European Union (EU), and the United States.

== 2003–2007 attacks ==
The group first emerged in 2003 with a bombing attack on an Athens courthouse complex, following that up with attacks in 2004 on Citibank and an Athens police station. In May 2004, the group published its first manifesto in the Greek satirical magazine To Pontiki, in which it expressed revolutionary, anarchist, anti-globalisation and anti-imperialist ideological aims. Following a January 12, 2007, RPG-7 attack on the U.S. Embassy, Greek authorities mistakenly described the group as a spinoff of Revolutionary Organization 17 November. The group attacked a police station in Nea Ionia several months later. These attacks led to Revolutionary Struggle becoming Greece's biggest domestic security threat since the 17 November Group disbanded in 2002.

In a statement published in To Pontiki on January 25, 2007, Revolutionary Struggle admitted that it had carried out the embassy attack, claiming that the "strike was our answer to the criminal war against 'terrorism' that the US has unleashed over the entire planet with the help of fellow-traveling states". The European Union added EA to its list of designated terrorist organizations on June 29, 2007. On May 18, 2009, a U.S. State Department spokesman announced in a press briefing that U.S. Secretary of State Hillary Clinton had formally designated Revolutionary Struggle as a foreign terrorist organization under the U.S. Immigration and Nationality Act.

=== Investigation ===
In January 2009, Greek police said their ballistics tests showed the weapon used in EA's 30 April 2007 attack was used again in a 5 January 2009 shooting of a police officer. A second weapon used in the 5 January attack was tied by the police to a 23 December 2008 attack on a police bus. That attack was reported to have been claimed by a group calling itself Popular Action (Λαϊκή Δράση, Laiki Drasi), as a response to the 2008 civil unrest in Greece.

=== Arrests ===
On March 10, 2010, two men were spotted breaking into a car (SEAT Ibiza) in Dafni, Attica at 4:40am and possibly resisted arrest by firing on the police officers. One of the men, Lambros Fountas, a microbiologist, who was later found to have been known to the police since 1995 due to being arrested in relation to the wave of protests and occupations at the National Technical University of Athens, was shot dead, but the other escaped. Police reported that, based on forensic evidence left at the scene, the men were connected to a previous attack carried out by EA.

In April 2010 the death of Fountas and subsequent property searches reportedly lead police to the six suspected members of the group, Pola Roupa, Nikos Maziotis, Costas Gournas, Sarantos Nikitopoulos, Vangelis Stathopoulos and Christoforos Kortesis were arrested after multiple raids across athens, before being remanded in custody. The subsequent investigation led police to over €119,000 in cash, Zastava handguns, fake identification documents which were used to rent safehouses, explosives (195 kg of ANFO hidden in a motorbike garage) and detailed plans of future attacks.

Later, police investigating another address in Kypseli rented under another false ID used by the suspects discovered an RPG-7. Other weapons discovered there included hand grenades, dynamite, and an MP5 submachine gun whose serial number was linked to gun stolen in a 2004 Thessaloniki bank robbery.

In late April 2010 whilst in detention three EA members, Maziotis, Roupa and Gournas, confirmed their own involvement as well as the involvement of Lambros Fountas in Revolutionary Struggle in a letter to the press, but denied that the government could prove they participated in the actions related to their charges. The three also promised to continue their revolutionary activities as long as they are living, with Ekathimerini quoting the letter saying, “As long as we are alive, as long as we live and breathe, we will do whatever we can to scupper criminal plans that harm common people,”.

Maziotis, Roupa and Gournas were released from pre-trial custody in October of 2012 after serving the legal maximum of 18 months, although with bail conditions including a ban on leaving the Attica Prefecture, and having to regularly check in with the police.

Pola Roupa and Nikos Maziotis were convicted for their participation in the group's activities in absentia after absconding with their son in 2012. Maziotis was later re-captured in 2014 after a shootout with police officers left him wounded, and Roupa in 2017 alongside another woman, during a dawn raid on a flat in the Ilioupoli district of Athens, with a local man quoting that "Around 30 masked anti-terror police entered the house... using crowbars to open the door."

On January 31, 2020, Konstantina Athanasopoulou was arrested along with Giannis Michailidis, a Greek anarchist known as "the archer of Syntagma" convicted of an armed bank robbery in 2013 and for an armed attack on members of the police force's immediate response unit in 2015 and had in a year prior to the arrest escaped a prison in Tyrinth, and an unnamed woman were captured by Anti-Terrorism police, claiming the trio were heavily armed.

== Prison ==
Nikolaos Maziotis, the reported leader of Revolutionary Struggle disappeared in April 2014 during his trial at Korydallos prison but was captured in July 2014 after a shootout with police Central Athens during a robbery, leaving himself and two others including one police officer injured. In 2016 Maziotis again attempted escape when Pola Roupa attempted to help Maziotis along with other political prisoners escape from prison via a hijacked helicopter. Reportedly Roupa rented a helicopter before pulling a pistol on the pilot, a retired police officer, in an attempt to force him to fly over the prison. The pilot instead started a landing and attempted to force the weapon from Roupa. Two shots were fired in the struggle, with an ammunition clip as well as a wig Roupa used as part of her disguise left behind as she fled.

=== Releases ===
==== Nikos Maziotis ====
In September of 2026 convicted EA member Nikos Maziotis was released from Domokos Prison after serving 14 years of his 20 year sentence, working off 6 years through prison labour. Maziotis, in a letter shortly before release, spoke on serving his sentence and the denials of conditional release on the grounds of being unreformed, writing, "Indeed, they are right! At a hearing of the Judicial Council, when I was asked whether I had been “corrected”, I replied that this would not happen even in 1,000,000 years. I therefore refuse to adopt their “ethics”, the ethics of submission, nor have I, of course, revised my position on Revolutionary Struggle’s actions, which were beneficial and necessary for the social majority, the people and the proletariat, since they were directed against the criminal state-capitalist system of power.", continuing in relation to how he sees the world today, "Especially under today’s conditions, in which the system is becoming increasingly brutal, condemning us to lifelong debt slavery, poverty and destitution, exterminating peoples and populations it deems surplus through wars, genocides and policies aimed at preserving itself, and slowly but surely killing the planet we live on for the sake of profit and the power of a vile minority. Under these conditions, the struggle against the state and capital is not only just but necessary and imperative."

== List of attacks ==
- January 2007: Grenade fired at American embassy facade in Athens
- April 2007: Shots fired at police station in Athens suburb of Nea Ionia
- October 2008: Failed bomb attempt on Royal Dutch Shell's headquarters in south Athens
- January 2009: In response to the killing of Alexandros Grigoropoulos, shots fired at police guarding the Ministry of Culture building in Athens, seriously wounding one police officer
- March 2009: Two bomb attacks on Citibank branches in Athens
- May 2009: Bomb attack on a Eurobank Ergasias branch in suburban Athens.
- 3 July 2009: Suspected bomb attack on a McDonald's in Athens Ambelokipi district causes "extensive damage."
- September 2009: Explosion outside the Athens stock exchange causing minor injuries to one woman and significant damage to the surrounding area. A second bomb in Thessaloniki causing minor damage and no injuries.
- 13 May 2010: A bomb exploded outside Korydallos Prison in Athens, injuring a woman. Police suspected the Revolutionary Struggle.
- 14 May 2010: Only one day after the bomb-explosion in Athens, a second bomb exploded in the court of Thessaloniki. One person was injured. The building got heavily damaged inside.
- 25 June 2010: A parcel bomb exploded within the Greek Ministry of Public Order. The bomb was addressed to the Minister of Public Order, Michalis Chrysohoidis, but was instead opened by Giorgos Vassilakis, his aide. Giorgos was killed in the attack. While not immediately claimed by Revolutionary Struggle, Greek terrorism expert Dr Athanasios Drougas said the attack was likely carried out by the group.
- 10 April 2014: Car bomb attack on a Bank of Greece and a Piraeus Bank headquarters in central Athens. 76 kg of explosives located in a car went off destroying the front facades of surrounding buildings. No persons were injured. The action was claimed later by Revolutionary Struggle in Athens Indymedia.
- 2016: Hijacking of a helicopter and attempted escape of an imprisoned member.

== See also ==
- Anarchism in Greece
- Terrorism in Greece
