= Stephen Saunders (British Army officer) =

British army officer (1947–2000)

- Born: 26 July 1947; Farnborough, Hampshire, England
- Died: 8 June 2000 (aged 52); Athens, Greece
- Burial place: St Osmund's Church, Melbury Osmond, Dorset, England
- Spouse: Heather Saunders
- Military career
- Allegiance: United Kingdom
- Branch: British Army
- Service years: 1965–2000
- Rank: Brigadier
- Service number: 484022
- Units: Duke of Edinburgh's Royal Regiment
- Conflicts: Operation Banner; United Nations Peacekeeping Force in Cyprus
- Awards: Queen's Commendation for Valuable Service; Mentioned in Despatches

Brigadier Stephen William John Saunders (26 July 1947 – 8 June 2000) was a British Army officer who, while serving as the British military attaché in Athens, was assassinated by members of the Greek urban guerrilla Marxist–Leninist organization Revolutionary Organization 17 November (17N).

== Early life and military career ==
Saunders was born in Farnborough, Hampshire, the son of a British Army officer. Educated at Peter Symonds School, Winchester, he joined the British Army in 1965 and was commissioned into the Duke of Edinburgh's Royal Regiment, having completed his officer training at the Royal Military Academy Sandhurst.

From October 1968 he spent three years reading for an in-service degree in Geography and Economics at the University of Bristol. On returning to his battalion, he served in Berlin, Cyprus, Northern Ireland and West Germany, before attending the Staff College, Camberley, in 1981. His first staff appointment was at HQ Northern Ireland.

Saunders returned to his battalion, and served for a spell with the United Nations in Cyprus. He was promoted to lieutenant colonel in 1986 and, after serving on the staff at HQ United Kingdom Land Forces, commanded his battalion in Northern Ireland, for which he was mentioned in despatches, and then Hong Kong. During his two years in Hong Kong, he took part in training exercises in Malaysia, South Korea, Hawaii and Australia.

He then joined the British military training scheme in Zimbabwe, lending assistance to the Zimbabwe National Army. On promotion to colonel in 1992, he was posted as Deputy Commander, Headquarters 8th Infantry Brigade in Derry, his service during this tour earning him the Queen's Commendation for Valuable Service. From 1993 to 1996 he was military attaché on the British defence liaison team in Canberra and a defence adviser in Papua New Guinea.

In 1997, he was posted to Kuwait and spent a year as Military Assistant to the Force Commander United Nations Iraq–Kuwait Observation Mission.

== Assassination and investigation ==
Saunders was attacked and shot dead by two men on a motorcycle while driving through Athens traffic on his way to work at the British embassy at 07:48 on 8 June 2000. 17 November (17N) claimed responsibility for the killing in a proclamation dated March 2000 and published in Eleftherotypia on 9 June 2000. The group charged, falsely, that Saunders was an RAF wing commander involved in the 1999 NATO bombing of Yugoslavia. In fact, he was a British Army brigadier with broad peacekeeping experience completely unconnected with the Kosovo War.

17N revealed in a second proclamation dated 11 December 2000, also published in Eleftherotypia, the killers targeted Saunders because their primary target, CIA Agent John Kiriakou, was believed to be too heavily armed. Therefore, the killers used a Heckler & Koch G3 assault rifle they had stolen from a Greek police station in August 1988. That gun jammed after one shot, and the killer[s] fired four more shots with a .45 Colt M1911 pistol. Saunders died in the hospital two hours later.

Witnesses reported to police that they saw a shorter man behind a taller man, both helmeted, on a white Enduro motorcycle. Police recovered a stolen green Modenas Kris 111cc scooter with stolen licence plates parked nearby.

The investigation that followed was driven by an unprecedented level of co-operation between Greek and UK Police services, with support from the U.S. FBI and CIA. Scotland Yard provided training and sent Greek-speaking police officers to compile and restudy the fragmentary evidence compiled since 17N began its operations in 1975. Heather Saunders made a highly effective televised appeal for help in finding the murderers. Family members of 17N victims formed an advocacy group Os Edo (Ως Εδώ – "Enough" [literally: "Up to Here"]) that lobbied for a tougher Greek anti-terrorism law, passed as Law 2928/2001.

The investigation identified suspects for membership in 17N but produced no evidence usable in court. On 29 June 2002, 17N member Savvas Xiros (hitherto unknown to police) was gravely injured when a time bomb he was planting exploded prematurely in Piraeus. He agreed to confess that he had driven the scooter, with fellow member Dimitris Koufodinas carrying the G3. Before the 2003 trial of 19 suspected members of 17N, Xiros retracted his confession. Both he and Koufodinas were sentenced to life imprisonment for the murder. An activist against the Greek military junta of 1967–1974 named Alexandros Giotopoulos, living underground under the pseudonym Mihalis Oikonomou since 1971, was convicted as 17N's leader and thus the moral instigator of the murder, while Savvas's brother Vasilis was convicted as the accomplice who helped preposition the vehicles.

=== Accusations of U.S. government complicity ===
One of many attempts to implicate the U.S. government as the sponsor of 17N appeared in December 2005, when Kleanthis Grivas published an article in To Proto Thema, a Greek Sunday newspaper. He claimed that "Sheepskin", the Greek version of Gladio, NATO's stay-behind paramilitary capability during the Cold War, carried out the assassination of CIA station chief Richard Welch in Athens in 1975, and also the assassination of Stephen Saunders more than a decade after the Cold War ended. This charge was denied by the US State Department, which responded that "the Greek terrorist organization '17 November' was responsible for both assassinations", and noted that Grivas's central piece of evidence was a disinformation document of Soviet origin (the so-called "Westmoreland Field Manual") which the State department, as well as a Congressional inquiry had dismissed as a Soviet forgery. The documents make no specific mention of Greece, 17N, nor Welch. The State Department also highlighted the fact that, in the case of Richard Welch, "Grivas bizarrely accuses the CIA of playing a role in the assassination of one of its own senior officials" as well as the Greek government's statements to the effect that the "stay behind" network had been dismantled in 1988.

In his 2010 memoir The Reluctant Spy: My Secret Life in the CIA's War on Terror, former CIA officer John Kiriakou wrote of driving past Saunders's blood-stained car the morning of 8 June. He stated that the reason for his abrupt departure from Greece in August 2000 was the discovery that Greek urban guerrilla organization 17N had been stalking him instead of Saunders. He quoted the 17N proclamation taking responsibility for the Saunders murder: "We saw the big spy, but he was in an armored car and we knew that he was armed. So we elected to carry out the sentence on the war criminal Saunders".

== Legacy ==
Saunders was buried with a Commonwealth War Graves Commission headstone in the churchyard of the parish church of Melbury Osmond, Dorset, close to where he had previously lived. His life is commemorated by a memorial stone set in the floor of St. Paul's Church in Athens and a plaque on the memorial wall at the Foreign and Commonwealth Office.

In 2001, St. Catherine's British School in Athens initiated the Stephen Saunders Award for Good Citizenship to a pupil with outstanding contribution to school life, society and the support of others.

== See also ==
- Greece – United Kingdom relations
