= Christodoulos Xiros =

Greek terrorist

- Born: 1958 (age 67–68); Ikaria, North Aegean, Greece
- Citizenship: Greek
- Relatives: Savvas Xiros
- Criminal charges: Murder
- Penalty: Back to back life sentences

Christodoulos Xiros (Greek: Χριστόδουλος Ξηρός; (with letter x pronounced ks as in the word mix", born 1958) is a Greek far-left terrorist and former member of 17 November urban guerilla organisation. He participated in the murder of many high-profile targets affiliated with the Greek government as well as NATO and CIA organisations, including Nikos Momferatos, Panagiotis Roussetis, Nikos Georgakopoulos, Dimitris Angelopoulos and US Navy Captain William Nordeen. He was put on trial in 2002. He was sentenced to life imprisonment.
