= 2021 Greek protests =

2021 protests in greece

- Date: 4 February 2021 – March 2021
- Location: Greece
- Caused by: Kerameus-Chrisochoidis Law allowing police on university campuses; Hunger strike of Dimitris Koufontinas; Authoritarianism; Police brutality; Government mishandling of the COVID-19 pandemic
- Goals: Repeal of campus security law; Transfer of Dimitris Koufontinas to Korydallos Prison
- Methods: Protests; Demonstrations; Vandalism
- Result: Protests contained: Kerameus-Chrisochoidis Law passed and partially implemented; Koufontinas' hunger strike ended

Parties
Students; Academic personnel Opposition: SYRIZA; Communist Party of Greece; MeRA25; Anarchists	Government of Greece: Hellenic Police; New Democracy

Lead figures
No centralized leadership	Kyriakos Mitsotakis (Greece) Michalis Chrisochoidis (Greece) Niki Kerameus; Lt.Gen. Michail Karamalakis

The 2021 Greek protests broke out in response to a proposed government bill that would allow police presence on university campuses for the first time in decades, for which opposition groups accused the government of taking advantage of the COVID-19 lockdown to impose increasingly authoritarian measures. Protests intensified in response to the hunger strike of the prisoner Dimitris Koufontinas, a former member of terrorist organization 17N, who had started the strike in December, demanding his transfer to a different prison after he had been forcibly relocated to a maximum-security facility in central Greece, as well as issues relating to police brutality and specifically the DELTA Force motorcycle police.

The prime minister condemned the opposition parties as having "exploited lockdown fatigue", which he blamed for the frequent rallies.

== Events ==
=== February ===
On 4 February, university students and teachers took to the streets to protest against a proposed education reform bill that would allow for a renewed police presence on university campuses. 5,000 protestors demonstrated in Athens, while an additional 1,000 demonstrated in Thessaloniki. In defiance of the ban on public gatherings imposed by the lockdown, students organized weekly protests to continue against the new bill.

On 10 February, the date of a scheduled debate on the education reform bill, clashes broke out with the police in Athens and Thessaloniki, during which police used tear gas to disperse protests and protestors threw bottles, rocks and molotov cocktails back at the police.

On 22 February, protestors occupied the principal's building in the University of Thessaloniki and, when police attempted to remove them, clashes broke out. This led to the arrest of 31 people and the issuing of €300 fines to 32 protestors, for violating the terms of the country's lockdown. More than 5,000 people subsequently gathered outside a courthouse in Thessaloniki to protest in support of those arrested.

On 23 February, people scattered leaflets outside the presidential mansion of Katerina Sakellaropoulou, to protest in support of Dimitris Koufontinas.

On 24 February, a Koufontinas solidarity demonstration in Athens was dispersed by police using tear gas, stun grenades and a water cannon.

=== March ===
On 1 March, the Greek government refused Koufontinas' demand of transfer to Korydallos Prison. By this point, Koufontinas' health had seriously deteriorated due to the effects of his hunger strike. Thousands of people held peaceful protests in Athens and Thessaloniki following the government's decision.

On 7 March, the Athens police reported that when a police patrol entered Nea Smyrni to investigate reports of lockdown violations, they were subsequently attacked by a group of 30 people, injuring 2 officers, leading to the detention of 11 people. However, videos of the event emerged, showing peaceful protestors being thrown to the ground by the police and attacked with batons. Four hours later, more than 500 people gathered to protest the incident and were violently dispersed using tear gas and stun grenades. Pavlos Christidis of the Movement for Change denounced the incident, claiming that “It wasn’t an accident. The government and Mitsotakis wanted this.”

On 9 March, 5,000 people gathered outside the precinct in Nea Smyrni to protest against the police brutality, during which young protestors threw stones and molotov cocktails at the police. The police responded with water cannons, tear gas and stun grenades, but during the clashes, a police officer was severely injured by protestors. Testimonies and videos show cases of police brutality even against journalists. Among the videos published there exists one in which a police officer appears to throw a molotov cocktail to the protestors. Another video shows police officers shouting among them "Let's go kill them!" (the protestors). In total, 10 people were arrested on suspicion of participating in the riots, and some of them allegedly tortured. The riots were condemned by both the government and opposition parties. The prime minister gave a televised address in response, during which he said: “Blind rage does not lead anywhere. It should serve as a wake-up call that the life of a young policeman was endangered. At this point everyone must display restraint and calm.”

On 11 March, after the occupation at the University of Thessaloniki was ended by police, 8,000 people protested against the police crackdown. Protestors clashed with the police, during which firebombs and tear gas were exchanged, and multiple people were arrested.

On 14 March, Dimitris Koufontinas ended his hunger strike after 66 days, as it had led to kidney failure. He thanked those that had protested in solidarity with him in his “fight against an inhumane power system.”

== See also ==
- 2008 Greek riots
- Anti-austerity movement in Greece
- Athens Polytechnic uprising
- Protests over responses to the COVID-19 pandemic
