= Albert Negahnquet =

The Reverend Albert J. Negahnquet
- First American Indian Catholic Priest
- Church: Roman Catholic Church
- Archdiocese: Roman Catholic Diocese of Superior

Orders
- Ordination: June 6, 1903
- Rank: Priest

Personal details
- Born: December 11, 1874 St. Mary's, Kansas, United States
- Died: November 13, 1944 (aged 69) Asher, Oklahoma, United States
- Buried: Sacred Heart Cemetery, Asher, Oklahoma
- Denomination: Roman Catholic
- Parents: Stephen (Nebawqua) Negahnquet & Angeline Wawaseq
- Spouse: Edith Duncan (married in 1925)
- Occupation: Priest, Missionary, Chaplain
- Profession: Priesthood
- Education: Sacred Heart Mission Institute, College of the Propaganda Fide (Rome)

Albert J. Negahnquet (December 11, 1874 – November 13, 1944), also known as Dom Bede or Leading-Cloud, was the first Native American Catholic priest in the United States.

== Personal life and education ==
Albert was born near St. Mary's, Kansas, to Stephen (Nebawqua) Negahnquet (1853 - 1936) and Angeline Wawaseq (1855 - 1907) in 1874. He was the eldest of ten siblings.

His father, Stephen, was a prominent figure in Kansas and was allotted several sections of land in the "Treaty of Washington with the Potawatomi" in 1867. In the treaty, the Prairie Band Potawatomi Nation territory in Kansas was split and sold in sections to allow for the purchase of land near modern-day Shawnee, Oklahoma. The Potawatomi that relocated to Oklahoma became the Citizen Potawatomi Nation.

On the Oklahoma Reservation, Stephen quickly gained leadership and was elected to the Citizen Potawatomi Business Committee. He was among the first members of the tribe to approve of the Catholic Sacred Heart Mission settling in Potawatomi County in 1879.

From a young age Albert "wanted to educate the Potawatomi people in the teachings of the Bible in their own language.” His father thereupon enrolled him at Sacred Heart Mission Institute, a Catholic Indian boys boarding school. He subsequently attended the College of the Propaganda Fide in Rome. He spoke the Potawatomi language as well as English and Italian.

== Personal life ==
In 1925, Albert renounced his priesthood vows in order to marry a widow, Edith Duncan, at Fort Worth, Texas. The couple lived in Oklahoma City until Edith filed for divorce in 1936.

Albert Negahnquet died on November 13, 1944, and is buried at Sacred Heart Cemetery in Asher, Potawatomi County, Oklahoma.

== Career ==
After four years of study in Rome, Negahnquet was ordained a priest on June 6, 1903. Before him there had never been a full-blood Native American admitted to Roman Catholic priesthood.

Father Albert served many Native American communities throughout his life. Upon his return to the United States, he was stationed in Muskogee, Oklahoma as assistant missionary to the Creeks, Cherokees, and the white Catholics living among them. Most notable were his missions among the Chippewas of White Earth, Minnesota, the St. Agnes' Catholic Indian School in Antlers, Oklahoma, and his long-term position as chaplain at St. Louis' Osage School, Pawhuska, Oklahoma.

In 1925, he became assistant rector of St. Joseph's Cathedral in Oklahoma City.

The Indian Sentinel, a Catholic newspaper, regularly praised Father Albert and Father Philip B. Gordon, the second Native American Catholic priest, for undertaking their ecclesiastical vocations.
