= Korydallos Prison =

Prison in Athens, Greece

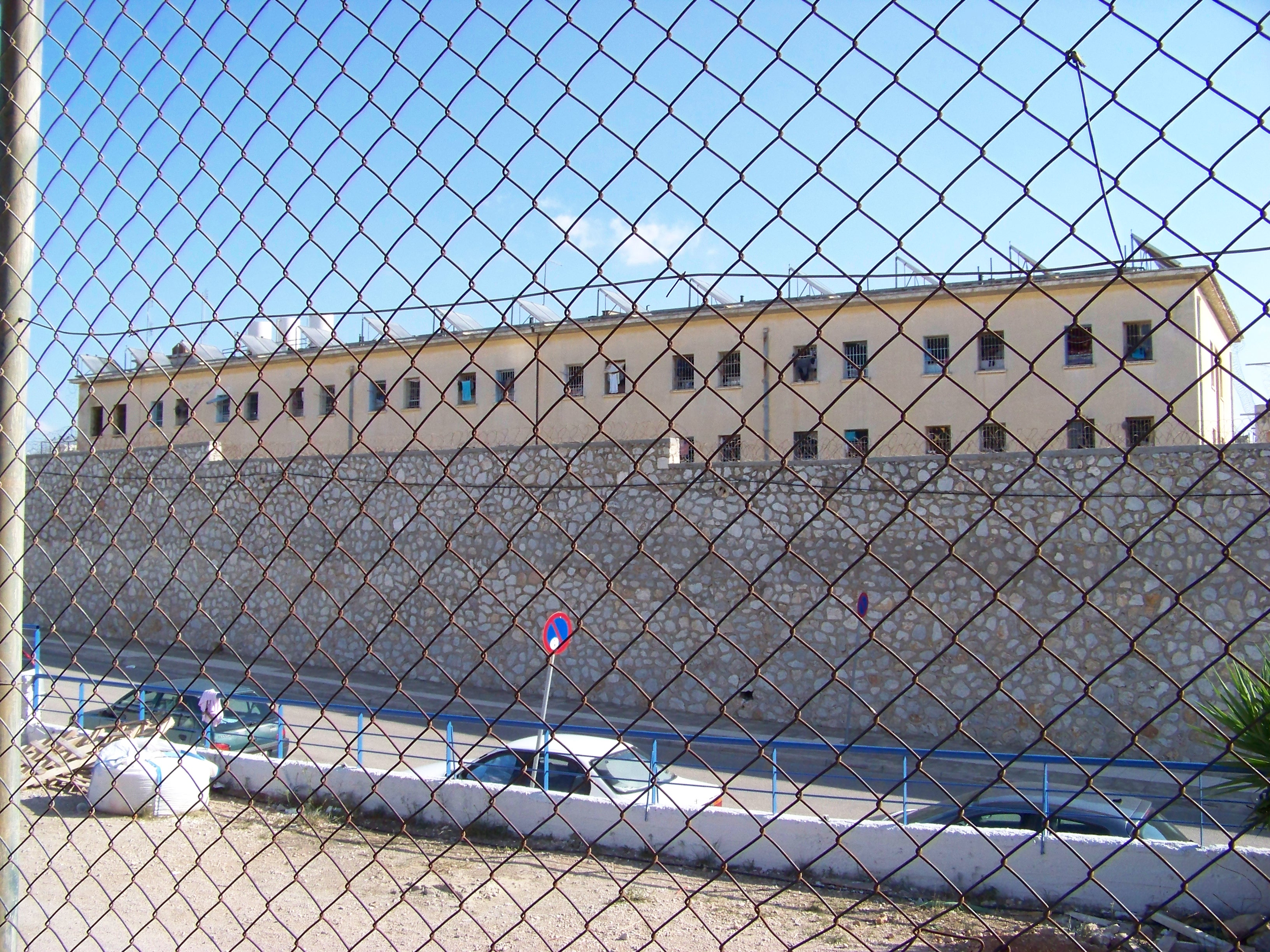
- Interactive map of Korydallos Prison
- Location: Piraeus, Greece; 37°58′56″N 23°38′50″E
- Security class: Type B

Korydallos Prison Complex (Greek: Φυλακές Κορυδαλλού) is Greece's largest jail and contains the country's main maximum-security prison (Type B), housing both maximum-security men and women. It is located in Korydallos, Piraeus. Famous detainees include members of the left wing urban guerrilla organizations Revolutionary Organization 17 November, Revolutionary Struggle and Conspiracy of Fire Nuclei. Korydallos prison was also used as the place for the Greek junta trials in 1975, and contains a special court in its basement.

Nikolaos Dertilis was the last remaining junta member in jail. He died 28 January 2013 at the age of 94.

== Conditions of detention ==
Amnesty International and other human rights bodies such as the Committee for the Prevention of Torture have repeatedly expressed concern about the prison for its overcrowding and inhumane treatment of detainees. In 2007, a special committee composed of physicians of the Division of Health Inspections of the Prefecture of Piraeus and Piraeus Medical Association has reported that the hospital and the mental clinic of the prison operate without even the minimum conditions of hygiene, with aging infrastructure and big shortages in medical and nursing staff. The Hellenic Parliament has vowed to improve conditions.

Since May 2008 the women prisoners section has been transferred to Thiva prison complex following many years of protests and complaints to the government by the Korydallos municipality and inhabitants. As of only one of the three women prison section hosts women under trial. Demolition works have commenced, for the two out of the three sections, in January 2010 and although they were expected to be completed till the end of June 2010, leaving free space of 10 acres (40,000 m^{2}) to be used as a park, the demolition was completed about 7 years after, in March 2017.

== Prisoner actions ==
In November 1995, there was a massive riot, with inmates taking control of the prison for several days in a "battle" with prison guards and police. Earlier in 1990, the inmates of Korydalos took over the entire complex for 28 days. The seizure of the complex was related to prison conditions and criminal justice reform. After the 28 day standoff, Justice officials bent to a majority of the demands the prisoners made and concessions were given in favor of the inmates.

There have been several politically motivated attacks in relation to Korydallos prison, including; On 13 May 2010, a bomb exploded outside the prison injuring a member of the public. Police suspected Revolutionary Struggle. In 2013, a bomb containing 1 kg of dynamite was left under the car of the governor of Korydallos Prison outside his home in Dafni, Athens. The attack was claimed by the Conspiracy of Fire Nuclei as "a show of solidarity for our 10 imprisoned brothers". And in 2016, a bomb exploded next to a prison officer's car at his home. The attack was reported as an attempt of intimidation.

In February 2008 a group of political inmates held a sit-down protest against the transfer of an anarchist prisoner to another prison. Among the protesters was N17 prisoner Dimitris Koufontinas.

In January 2021 Dimitris Koufontinas, then 63 year old prisoner convicted of crimes as part of November 17 Organization performed a 66 day hunger strike with the goal of being sent to Korydallos prison. Street demonstrations were held in multiple cities across Greece as well as attacks against property has been claimed in support of Koufontinas, Koufontinas ended the hunger strike after 66 days without his demands having been met.

== Notable inmates and escapes ==
Notable members of the Criminal Nazi Organisation Golden Dawn were held in Korydallos during pre-trial detention in 2013/2014.

Inmate Vasilis Paleokostas, known popularly as the 'Greek Robin Hood' drew attention to the prison when he escaped with a rented helicopter, twice in June 2006 and February 2009.

In January 2014 Christodoulos Xiros of 17 November Organization whilst serving multiple life sentences escaped after being granted temporary leave to see his family in the north of the country only to not return. Xiros was captured a year later allegedly preparing further guerrilla actions including aiding other prisoners in escape.

Nikolaos Maziotis, the reported leader of the urban guerrilla organization, Revolutionary Struggle disappeared in April 2014 during his trial at Korydallos prison. Maziotis was captured in July 2014 after a shootout with police in Central Athens during a robbery, leaving himself and two others including one police officer injured. In 2016 Maziotis again attempted escape when romantic partner and comrade in Revolutionary Struggle, Pola Roupa, unsuccessfully attempted to help Maziotis along with other political prisoners escape via a hijacked helicopter.

Human rights activist Sarah Mardini was incarcerated at Korydallos during 106 days in pre-trail detention, after being arrested for various crimes in 2018.
