= Alexandros Giotopoulos =

Greek Marxist-Leninist Urban Guerrilla

- Other names: Lampros, "the tall one" (ψηλός)
- Years active: 1975–2002
- Organization: Revolutionary Organization 17 November
- Height: 182 cm (6 ft 0 in)
- Judicial status: Incarcerated
- Criminal charges: Instigation of 17 murders, instigation of bombings and robberies and formation and leadership of a criminal organization.
- Penalty: 21 life sentences plus a 25-year prison sentence (First-instance trial); 17 life sentences plus a 25-year prison sentence (Appellate trial)

Alexandros Giotopoulos (Greek: Αλέξανδρος Γιωτόπουλος; born 1944) is the former leader of Greek urban guerilla organization 17 November (17N). He was found guilty in 2003 of leading the Marxist-Leninist Greek urban guerrilla group Revolutionary Organization 17 November (17N). He served 24 years of a sentence of seventeen life sentences plus 25 years imprisonment until his conditional release in May 2026.

== Biography ==
Giotopoulos was born in Paris in 1944, the son of Dimitris Giotopoulos. He was raised in Chalandri and in 1962 he returned to Paris where he studied mathematics and economics. Several decades later, from inside the prison, he continued his studies with a Master's in Theoretical Mathematics and later he earned a PhD degree from the Paris Cité University.

He was part of the United Democratic Left, and later, an opponent of the Greek military junta of 1967–1974. On the 29th of August 1972, he participated in the bombing of the US embassy in Greece.

== Revolutionary Organization 17 November ==
17N was responsible for a series of armed robberies, bombings, and assassinations of prominent Greek and foreign politicians, journalists, diplomats, and businessmen that left twenty-three people dead. Giotopoulos was identified as its leader after the arrest and confession of Savvas Xiros, another member of 17N, following a failed bombing attempt on a hydrofoil shipping company in Piraeus.

Giotopoulos appealed his conviction, and described himself as the victim of "an Anglo-American conspiracy". At the start of his appeal, in 2005, he received support from left-wing organisations and personalities in France, where he was born, including Alain Krivine and Pierre Vidal-Naquet. However, on May 3, 2007, his conviction and those of his 17N accomplices were sustained by the court of appeals.

== 2026 conditional release ==
On May 21, 2026, Giotopoulos was released from prison under specific restrictive conditions after serving 24 years. This judicial action followed his fifth petition for release, which was submitted on October 23, 2025. Giotopoulos had initially applied for a conditional release before the Piraeus Misdemeanor Court Council, but his request was rejected. He subsequently appealed the rejection. Although the subsequent judicial process involved a negative recommendation from the prosecutor, the Piraeus Court of Appeals ultimately accepted his motion and granted the release.

The court imposed the following restrictive conditions upon his release:

- He must reside strictly within his declared place of residence.
- He is prohibited from exiting the country.
- He must regularly appear at his local police station.

Following his release, other key convicted members of the 17 November organization—specifically Dimitris Koufontinas, Savvas Xiros, and Christodoulos Xiros—remain incarcerated.

However, his release triggered significant domestic and international backlash. On June 15, 2026, the Criminal Division of Greece's Supreme Court (Aeropagus) intervened and accepted an appeal launched by prosecutors against the initial release. The Supreme Court ruled that Giotopoulos did not meet the strict substantive legal criteria required for parole, nor had shown any signs of the required moral reformation or genuine remorse necessary to qualify for conditional release. Legally, under current Greek legal frameworks, convicts serving multiple life sentences are bound to heavy structural caps demanding definitive time served (25 years) before any path to early release (excluding Compassionate release, which is a different procedure under article 557 of the Code of Penal Procedure), is to be considered. Following the Supreme Court's annulment of his parole, a committal order was immediately issued. Giotopoulos surrendered to authorities and was officially processed through the Piraeus Court of Appeals Prosecutor's Office on June 16, 2026.
