= Greece–United Kingdom relations =

- United Kingdom: Greece

Greece and the United Kingdom maintain excellent and cordial relations and consider each other an ally with the Greek Prime Minister, Kyriakos Mitsotakis, paying an official visit to London in 2021. Greece and the United Kingdom are both members of the United Nations, NATO and the Council of Europe.

Greece is known to be one of the most Pro-British countries in the world. According to a global opinion poll, 77% of Greeks view the United Kingdom favourably, while only 10% view it unfavorably. The British have a very positive opinion of Greece as well. 71% of the British view Greece positively, while only 2% view it negatively, making Greece one of the 10 most liked countries in the UK.

The two countries were allies during the First World War and the Second World War, but also Greece received military and financial assistance from the United Kingdom during the Greek War of Independence. Both countries currently maintain relations via the British Embassy in Athens and a consulate general in Thessaloniki and the Greek Embassy in London and honorary Greek consulates in Belfast, Edinburgh, Glasgow, Leeds and Gibraltar.

== History ==
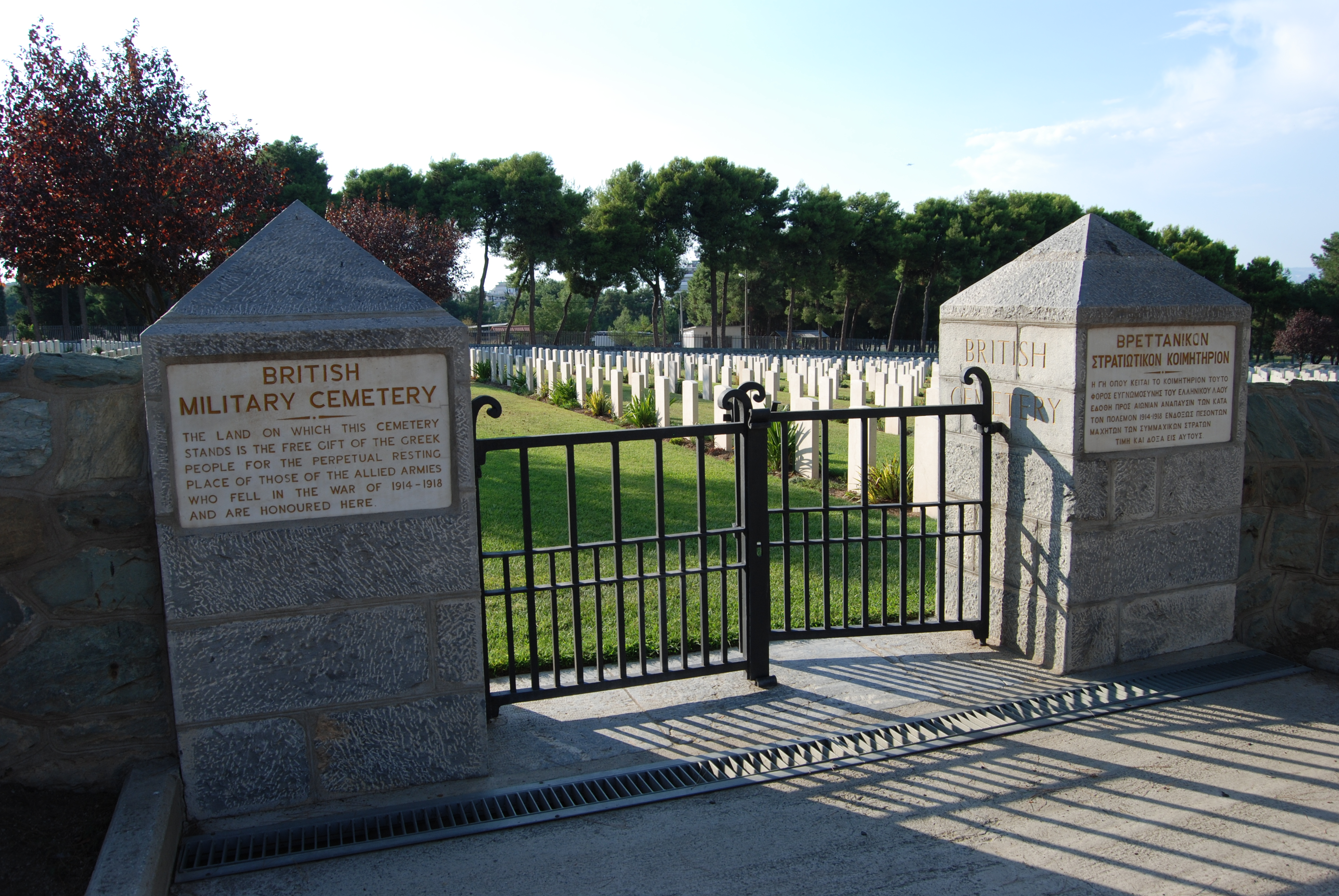
WWI Mikra British Cemetery in Thessaloniki

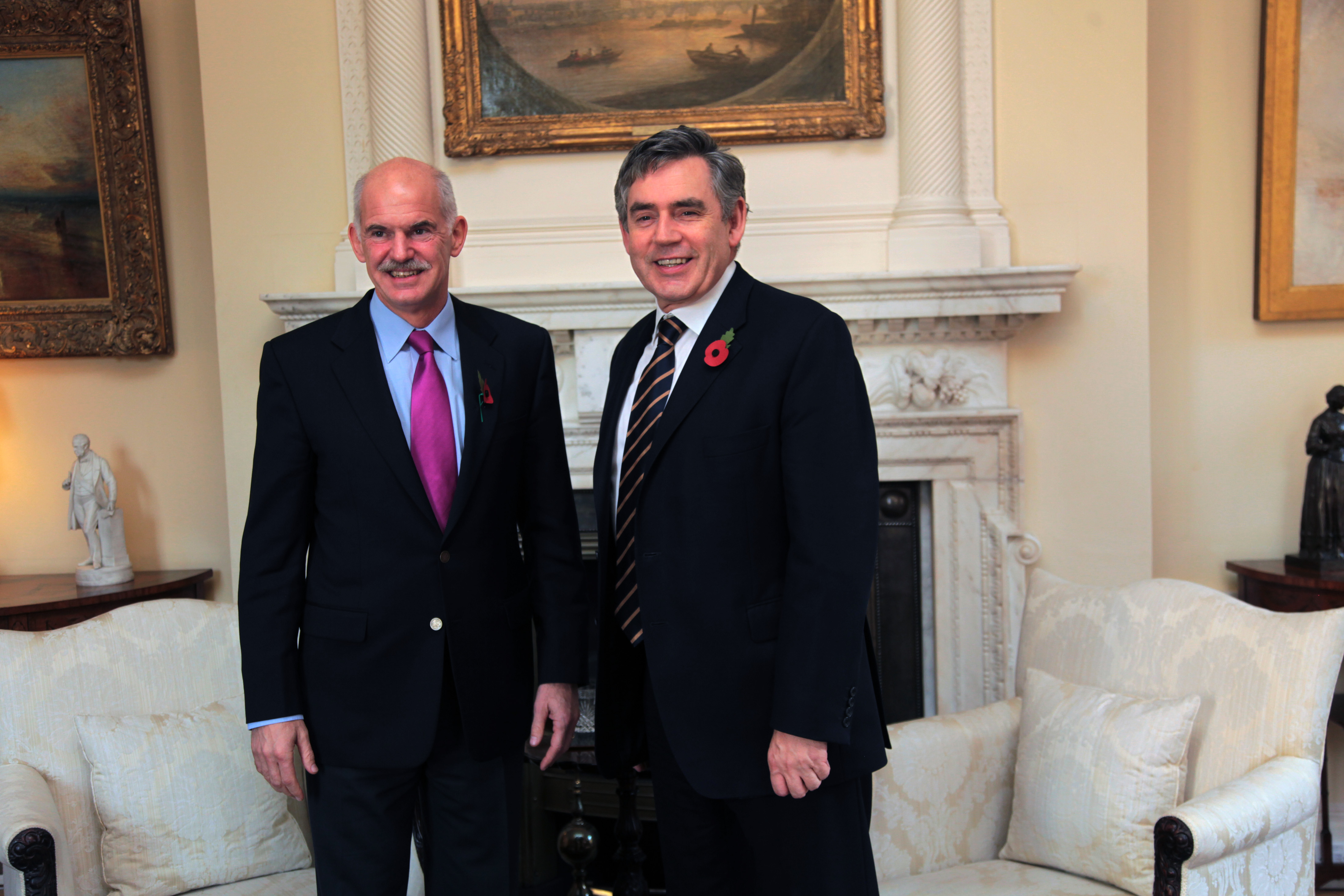
Gordon Brown with George Papandreou

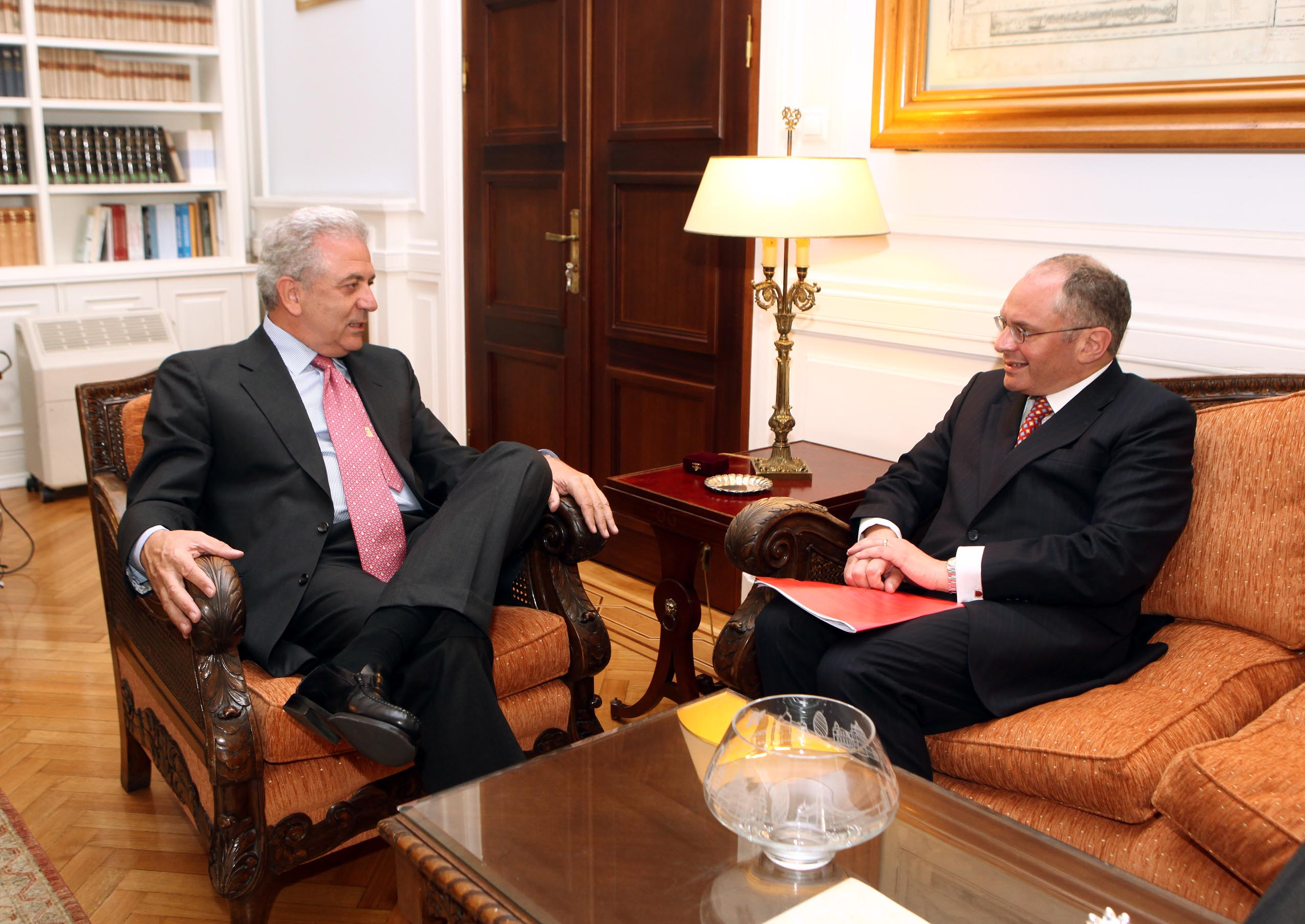
Foreign Minister Dimitris Avramopoulos (left) meeting with the Ambassador of the United Kingdom David Landsman in Athens in July 2012

The United Kingdom supported Greece in the Greek War of Independence from the Ottoman Empire in the 1820s with the Treaty of Constantinople being ratified at the London Conference of 1832.

In 1850, the British Foreign Secretary Lord Palmerston sent a Royal Navy squadron to Greece over the Pacifico incident.

When the Greek King Otto was deposed by the Greeks in 1862, Queen Victoria's son Alfred, Duke of Saxe-Coburg and Gotha was chosen to succeed him by the Greek people with a referendum. However, the British government would not allow this. The last British monarch Elizabeth II's late husband Prince Philip was the grandson of Otto's eventual successor George I of Greece.

The United Kingdom wrested control of the Ionian Islands from Napoleonic France in 1815. As the "United States of the Ionian Islands", they remained under British control, even after Greek independence. However, in 1864, the United Kingdom responded to calls for enosis by transferring the islands to Greece as a present for the enthronement of George I of Greece.

The two countries were Allies during World War I, and in the Paris Peace Conference at the end of the war British Prime Minister David Lloyd George supported Eleftherios Venizelos's irredentist Megali Idea policies. After 1918, UK was the only Allied power that supported Greece during the Greco-Turkish War until the end of the war.

They were Allies also during World War II. In 1941 Britain sent an expeditionary force to aid Greece against Fascist Italy's attempted invasion. During negotiations with Soviet leader Joseph Stalin in 1944, British Prime Minister Winston Churchill convinced Stalin to allow Britain a sphere of influence after the war. During the Greek Civil War at the beginning of the Cold War, Britain supported the Greek monarchy against the Communist National Liberation Front insurgency, although its weakened state after the war led the United States to take a greater role through the Truman Doctrine. Greece and Britain were both founding members of the North Atlantic Treaty Organization. However, relations between the two states were strained due to the Cyprus dispute.

In 2000, Stephen Saunders, the British military attaché in Athens, was murdered by motorcycle gunmen who were members of Revolutionary Organization 17 November. The investigation that followed led to an unprecedented level of co-operation between Greek and UK Police services, who achieved, following a lengthy investigation the arrest of members of 17N who were then brought to trial.

=== Conference of Hydra ===
The Conference of Hydra took place in the island of Hydra in March 2000 in order to boost further the friendship between Great Britain and Greece. Discussions during the conference emphasised the economic aspect of this relations and the ways to soar trade between Great Britain and Greece.

== Economic relations ==
Following Brexit, Trade between the United Kingdom and Greece is governed by the EU–UK Trade and Cooperation Agreement since 1 January 2021.

== Diplomatic representation ==
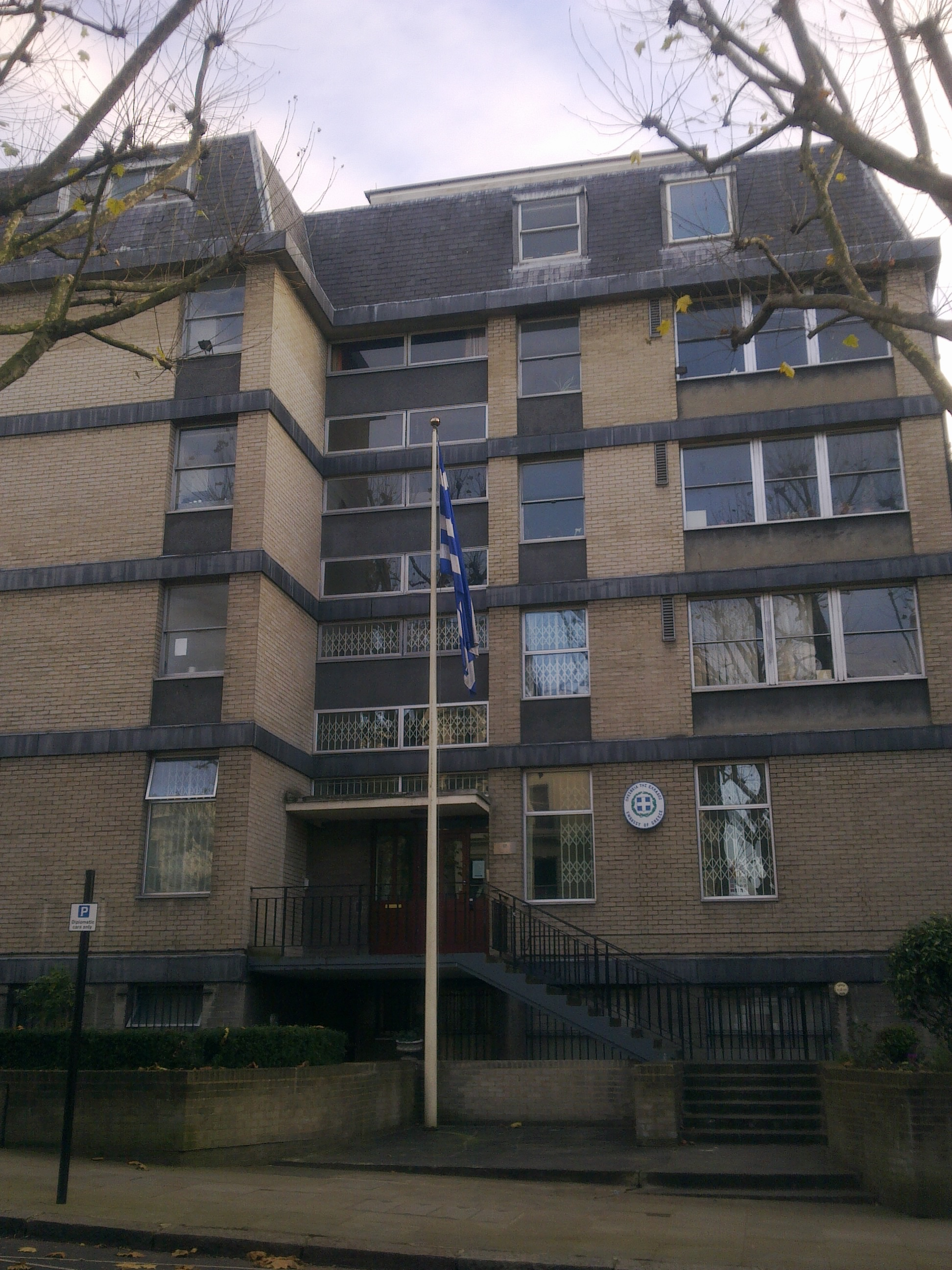
Embassy of Greece in London

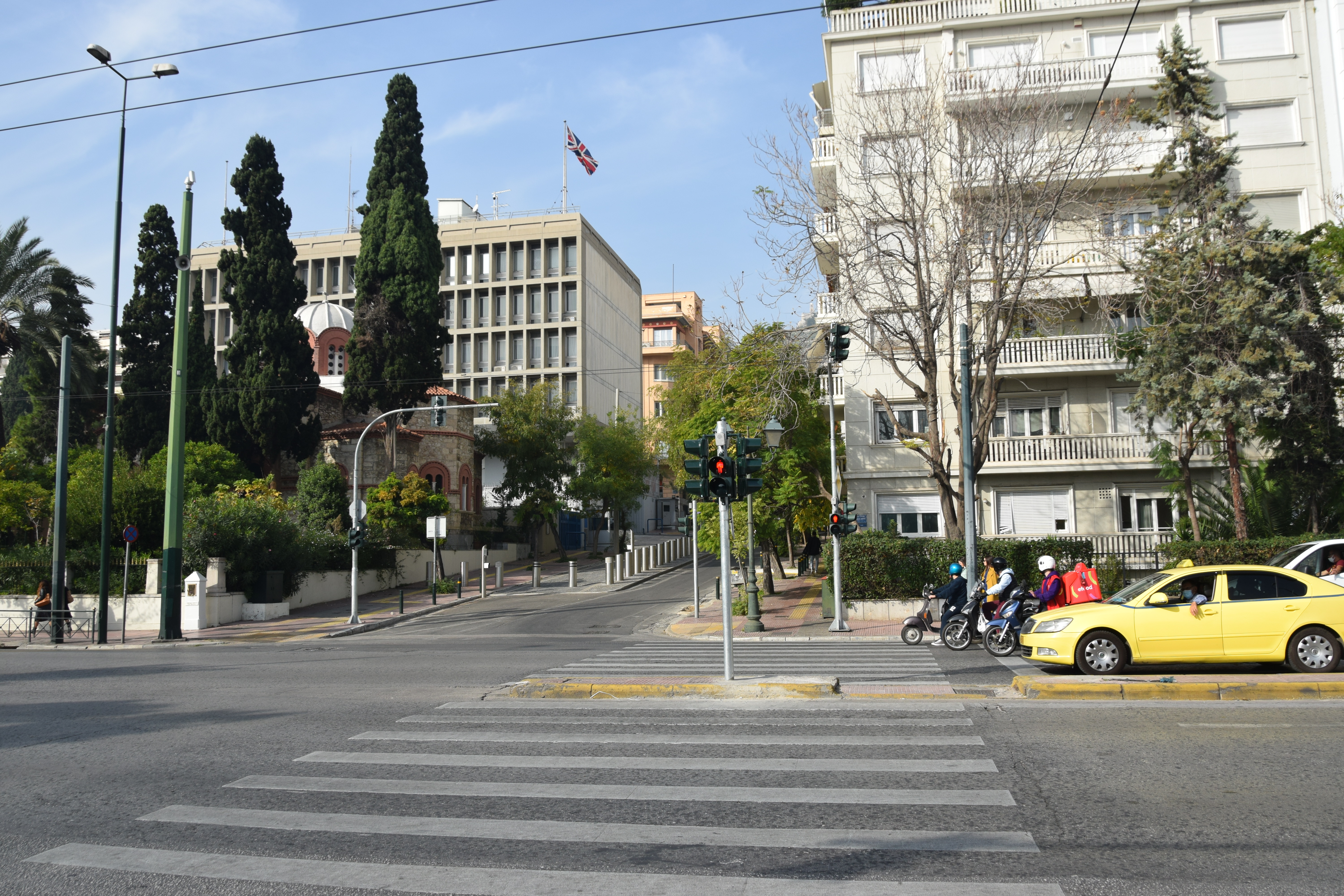
Embassy of the United Kingdom in Athens

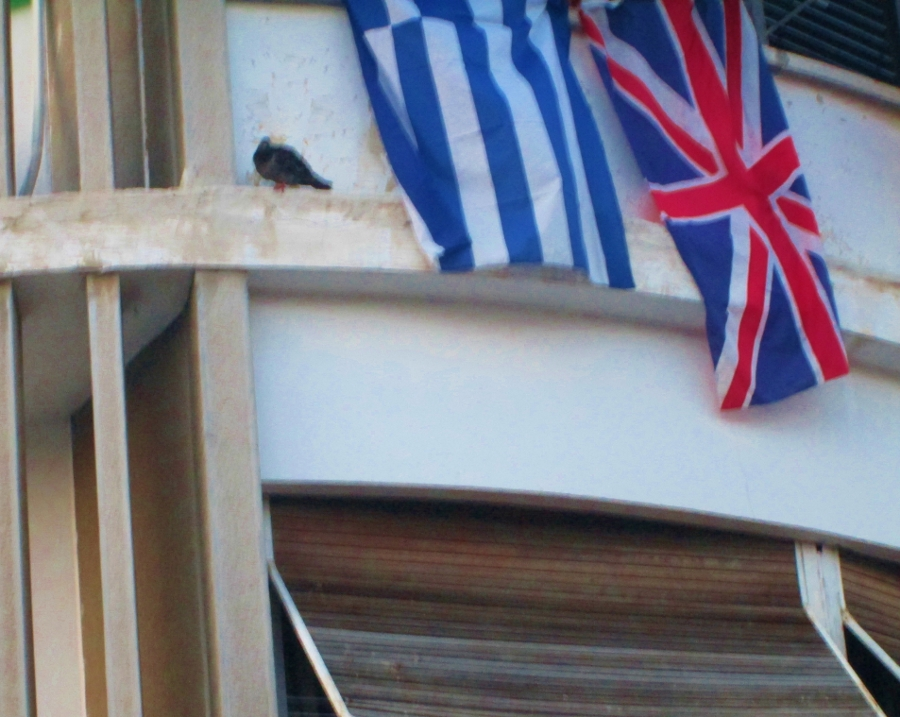
Greek and British flags waving from a window in Athens

Greece has an embassy in London and Honorary Consulates in Belfast, Birmingham, Edinburgh, Gibraltar, Glasgow and Leeds. The United Kingdom has an embassy in Athens and an Honorary Vice Consulate in Patras and Thessaloniki. The United Kingdom also has Honorary Consulates in Crete, Corfu, Rhodes, Thessaloniki and Zakynthos.

== Cultural exchange between Greece and the United Kingdom ==
There are between 40 and 45 thousand Greeks residing permanently in the UK, and the Greek Orthodox Church has a strong presence in the Archdiocese of Thyateira and Great Britain. The British cultural presence in Greece is promoted mainly through the British Council. There is a significant Greek presence of Greek students in tertiary education in the UK. A large Cypriot community – numbering 250-300 thousand – rallies round the National Federation of Cypriots in Great Britain and the Association of Greek Orthodox Communities of Great Britain. There are some 20 Greek cultural, philanthropic and professional organizations. There are seven chairs of Greek and Byzantine studies at the universities of Cambridge, Oxford, East Anglia, Royal Holloway, Birmingham, King's College and the London School of Economics, and two Greek Studies Centres, at the universities of Bristol and Reading.

=== Elgin Marbles ===
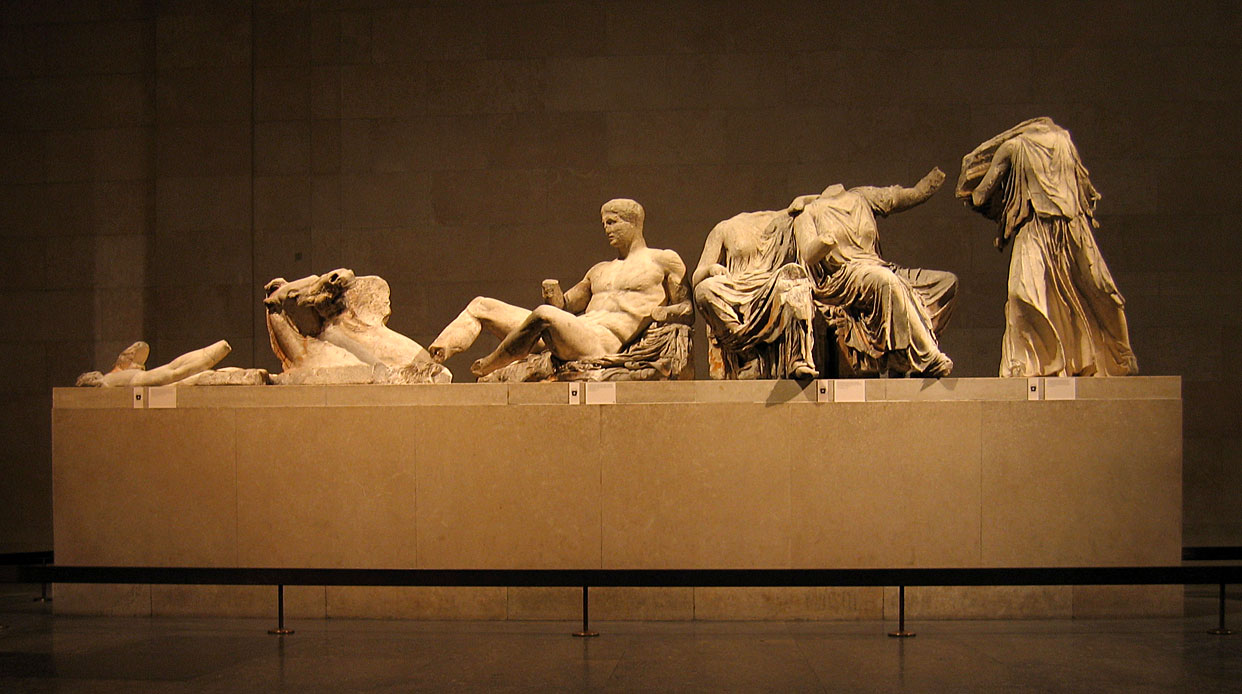
The ownership of the Elgin Marbles, held in the British Museum, are a source of tension between Greece and the UK

A source of tension between the UK and Greece is the dispute over the ownership of the Elgin Marbles, a collection of Classical Greek marble sculptures, inscriptions and architectural pieces that originally were part of the temple of Parthenon and other buildings on the Acropolis of Athens. Thomas Bruce, the 7th Earl of Elgin was allegedly given written permission by the Ottoman Sultan to remove the marbles between 1801 and 1812 and transported them by sea to Great Britain. In Britain, the acquisition of the collection was supported by many, while others likened Elgin's actions to vandalism.

The marbles are currently held in the collection of the British Museum. After gaining independence from the Ottoman Empire, Greece began major projects for the restoration of the country's monuments, and has expressed its disapproval of Elgin's actions to remove the marbles from the Acropolis and the Parthenon, which is regarded as one of the world's greatest cultural monuments, disputes the subsequent purchase of the marbles by the British Government and urges the return of the marbles to Greece.

The dispute arose especially during the 1980s by the governments of Andreas Papandreou and minister of culture Melina Mercouri. Then, «Tony Blair was enthusiastic about a proposal to return the Parthenon Sculptures, or Elgin Marbles, to Greece in an attempt to boost support for London's bid to host the Olympic Games in 2012. But advisers warned the attempt to reach an agreement with Athens over sharing the relics could face heavy resistance from the British Museum».

In 2014 UNESCO agreed to mediate between Greece and the United Kingdom in resolving the dispute of the Elgin Marbles.

On 28 November 2023, British PM Rishi Sunak canceled a scheduled meeting with Greek PM Kyriakos Mitsotakis due to a perceived violation of an agreement not to publicly discuss the Elgin Marbles.

== See also ==
- Foreign relations of Greece
- Foreign relations of the United Kingdom
- London Philhellenic Committee
- Anglo-Hellenic League
- British School at Athens
- Cyprus dispute
- Greek War of Independence
- Greeks in the United Kingdom
- The Hellenic Centre
- List of Ambassadors from the United Kingdom to Greece
- EU–UK relations
