= Philip B. Gordon =

- Native name: Dibishkoo-Giizhig
- Church: Catholic Church
- Diocese: Superior

Orders
- Ordination: December 8, 1913 by Joseph Maria Koudelka
- Rank: Priest

Personal details
- Born: March 31, 1885 Gordon, Wisconsin
- Died: October 1, 1948 (aged 63)
- Buried: Gordon Memorial Cemetery, Gordon, Wisconsin
- Denomination: Roman Catholic
- Education: St. Thomas Military College; Saint Paul Seminary School of Divinity; Catholic University of America; American College in Rome; University of Innsbruck; St. John's University

Philip Bergin Gordon (Ojibwe: Dibishkoo-Giizhig; March 31, 1885 - October 1, 1948) (Dibishkoo-Giizhig) ("At One With the Sky") Chippewa ("Ojibwe') was the second American Indian Catholic priest ordained in the United States. The first was Albert Negahnquet, a Potawatomi, in Oklahoma. A staunch advocate for Native American rights, critical of the Bureau of Indian Affairs, he was President of the Society of American Indians and also served on the "Committee of One Hundred" for U.S. president Calvin Coolidge. Following service at the Lac Courte Oreilles Indian Reservation, Gordon was assigned the pastorate of St. Patrick's Church in Centuria, Wisconsin in 1924, a position he held until his death.

== Personal life and education ==
A native of Gordon, Wisconsin, named for his grandfather Antoine Gordon, Gordon grew up in a family that encouraged education. His own was extensive. He attended the St. Thomas Military College in St. Paul, Minnesota from 1904 to 1908, following which he attended in sequence the Saint Paul Seminary School of Divinity, the Catholic University of America in Washington D.C., the American College in Rome, the University of Innsbruck in Austria, again the Saint Paul Seminary School of Divinity, and St. John's University at Collegeville, Minnesota.

Gordon's mother Ataage-kwe "Gambling Woman" lived until March 1940, and he often visited her at her home in Gordon, Wisconsin. He himself died on October 1, 1948, and was buried at the Gordon Memorial Cemetery in Gordon, Wisconsin.

== Career ==
Gordon was ordained on December 8, 1913. In his second year as a priest, he became Assistant Director of Catholic Indian Welfare for the Bureau of Catholic Missions in Washington, DC. However, in 1917 he was asked by Cardinal James Gibbons, President of the Bureau of Catholic Missions, to leave the Bureau due to his outspoken activism. Thereafter, he appealed for and received an assignment with the Chippewas, taking on pastorship for St. Francis Solano at Reserve, Wisconsin, and six Indian missions; the main mission at Reserve near the Lac Courte Oreilles Indian Reservation, two on the Lac du Flambeau Indian Reservation, one at Mud Lake and Russ Kelly, one at the mouth of Yellow River, and one at Old Post on the west branch of the Chippewa River. When the Reserve church burned in 1921, Gordon helped raise money to replace it with a church that would honor its Native American attendees by incorporating many native symbols.

For his activism, Gordon earned the name "Wisconsin's Fighting Priest." He focused heavily on proper food and medical care for natives and on Native American citizenship. In 1923, Gordon became the last president of the Society of American Indians and was invited to help form the "Advisory Council on Indian Affairs" (later to be known as the "Committee of One Hundred") to provide feedback on Native American policy. That same year, he was accused and cleared of misconduct. At the time, he wrote in the Superior Telegram:

It is an old trick of the Indian Office to blacken the character of any Indian that happens, notwithstanding the retardation caused by the Indian Bureau, to rise a little above the ranks. So as soon as an educated Indian begins to deplore the conditions of his brother Indians, the Indian Office dubs such a one a disturber, an agitator, and lately he is placed in the Bolshevik class. The whole Indian Bureau system of managing Indian business to the detriment of the Indian but for the benefit of a few greedy and voracious whites, is the most dramatic autocracy in existence the world over. Gradually through assistance of the American press, the generous hearted and justice loving American people are learning something of this present day Indian government humbuggery and deceit practiced by the Indian Office forces.

In January 1924, he was retired from his mission "for administrative reasons" and immediately appealed to the Apostolic Delegate to the Holy See in Washington, DC, for assignment to another Indian parish In May 1924, he was instead appointed pastor of the predominantly Irish-American St. Patrick's Church, in Centuria, Wisconsin, where he faced down both anti-Catholicism and the Ku Klux Klan He remained with the parish for the rest of his service.

== Honors ==
In 1972, the Knights of Columbus established the "Father Philip Gordon Council 6370 of the Knights of Columbus", comprising area parishes including St. Patrick's Church, in Centuria, Wisconsin.

== Resources ==
- Paula Delfeld, "The Indian Priest Philip B. Gordon 1885-1948", (1977).
- Canku Ota (Many Paths), An Online Newsletter Celebrating Native America, http://www.turtletrack.org/CO_Indices/CO_Index_FirstPerson.htm
- Tadeusz Lewandowski, "Ojibwe, activist, priest: the life of Father Philip Bergin Gordon, Tibishkogijik", (2019).
