= Embassy of the United States, Athens =

Diplomatic mission of the United States in Greece

Coordinates: 37.9822°N 23.7552°E

U.S. Embassy Athens
- The embassy building in 2006
- Address: 91 Vasilissis Sofias Avenue, Athens
- Ambassador: Kimberly Guilfoyle
- Jurisdiction: Greece
- Website: U.S. Embassy Greece

The Embassy of the United States in Athens (Πρεσβεία των Ηνωμένων Πολιτειών στην Αθήνα; Presveía ton Inoménon Politeión stin Athína) is the embassy of the United States in Greece, in the capital city of Athens. The embassy is charged with diplomacy and Greece–United States relations. The United States Ambassador to Greece is the head of mission of the United States to Greece.

Kimberly Guilfoyle is currently the United States Ambassador.

== Facilities ==
The chancery building in Athens was designed by Bauhaus architect Walter Gropius with consulting architect Pericles A. Sakellarios. It was constructed between 1959 and 1961 and is a protected architectural landmark. Gropius' design was in the characteristic simple Bauhaus form, inspired by the architecture of the Parthenon.

In 2003, the U.S. Embassy and the Athens Municipality celebrated the addition of a welcoming green space, the Makedonon Street Park. The landscaping of this pedestrian walkway was prompted by heightened security requirements.

A 2007 expansion added an office building, parking garage, compound entrances, fuel station, Marine Corps Security Guard quarters, swimming pool, and basketball court. The design of the new office building is intended to integrate well with the chancery, as well as with the adjacent Megaron Mousikis (Athens Concert Hall). The new office building enabled the embassy to bring onto the compound employees who have been working in leased space for many years.

The office building is 5,026 square metres (54,100 sq ft) and includes office space for over 150 people.

In September 2018, the embassy began a multi-year renovation that will provide additional office space and upgrade electrical and mechanical systems. The work is expected to cost $342 million and take four years to complete. Many of the components date to the building's construction in 1961.

Offices and sections include:

- Ambassador
- Deputy Chief of Mission
- Political Section
- Economic Section
- Consular Section (Visa and American citizen services; federal benefits)
- Public Affairs Section (Press Office, Cultural Office, Information Resource Center)
- United States Commercial Service
- Foreign Agricultural Service
- The Office of Defense Cooperation
- United States Immigration and Customs Enforcement and Citizenship and Immigrations Services

== Terrorism ==
2007 United States embassy attack
- Location: Athens, Greece
- Date: January 12, 2007; 5:58am (UTC+2)
- Target: Embassy of the United States in Athens
- Attack type: Rocket-propelled grenade
- Deaths: 0
- Injuries: 0

A minor terrorist attack occurred in the early morning of January 12, 2007. No casualties were reported. A rocket-propelled grenade Wasp 58 was fired into the embassy's modern, glass-fronted building. The Greek public order minister, Byron Polydoras, said an anonymous phone call claiming to be from the left-wing terror group Revolutionary Struggle had taken responsibility. On January 25, 2007, Revolutionary Struggle announced in local news outlets they took responsibility for the attack. On March 20, the Government of Greece and the United States Rewards for Justice Program announced equal, parallel rewards for information leading to the perpetrators – Greece offering 800,000 Euros and the US "up to $1 million or more".

The embassy was previously attacked by the Marxist Revolutionary Organization 17 November group on February 15, 1996, when an anti-tank missile hit the embassy's parking lot wall.

== See also ==
- United States Ambassador to Greece
- List of embassy attacks
- Revolutionary Struggle
- Revolutionary Organization 17 November
- Consulate General of the United States in Thessaloniki
