= Savvas Xiros =

Greek terrorist

- Born: 30 November 1962 (age 63); Florina, Western Macedonia, Greece
- Citizenship: Greek
- Spouse: Alicia Romero Cortes
- Relatives: Christodoulos Xiros
- Criminal charges: Murder
- Penalty: Back to back life sentences

Details
- Victims: Christos Matis, Kostas Peratikos
- Weapon: Rocket

Savvas Xiros (Greek: Σάββας Ξηρός; born November 30, 1962) is a Greek terrorist and member of Revolutionary Organization 17 (17N). He was arrested on June 29, 2002, at the Piraeus port after a bomb exploded in his hands. He was put on trial in 2003. He was convicted of life imprisonment for murders, robberies, explosions and participation in 17N.
