= Centuria, Wisconsin =

- Village
- Location of Centuria in Polk County, Wisconsin.
- Coordinates: 45°26′59″N 92°33′12″W
- Country: United States
- State: Wisconsin
- County: Polk

Area
  - Total: 1.70 sq mi (4.40 km^{2})
  - Land: 1.70 sq mi (4.40 km^{2})
  - Water: 0 sq mi (0.00 km^{2})
- Elevation: 1,230 ft (375 m)

Population (2010)
  - Total: 948
  - Estimate (2019): 910
  - Density: 535.5/sq mi (206.74/km^{2})
- Time zone: UTC-6 (Central (CST))
  - Summer (DST): UTC-5 (CDT)
- Area codes: 715 & 534
- FIPS code: 55-13850
- GNIS feature ID: 1562913
- Website: villageofcenturia.gov

Centuria is a village in Polk County, Wisconsin, United States. The population was 891 at the 2020 census.

== Geography ==
Centuria is located at 45°26′59″N 92°33′12″W (45.449651, -92.553201).

According to the United States Census Bureau, the village has a total area of 1.70 square miles (4.40 km^{2}), all land.

Centuria is along Wisconsin Highway 35 and Polk County Road I.

== Demographics ==
Historical population
| Census | Pop. | Note | %± |
|---|---|---|---|
| 1910 | 301 | | — |
| 1920 | 358 | | 18.9% |
| 1930 | 435 | | 21.5% |
| 1940 | 411 | | −5.5% |
| 1950 | 521 | | 26.8% |
| 1960 | 551 | | 5.8% |
| 1970 | 632 | | 14.7% |
| 1980 | 711 | | 12.5% |
| 1990 | 790 | | 11.1% |
| 2000 | 865 | | 9.5% |
| 2010 | 948 | | 9.6% |
| 2020 | 891 | | −6.0% |
U.S. Decennial Census

=== 2010 census ===
As of the census of 2010, there were 948 people, 414 households, and 227 families living in the village. The population density was 557.6 inhabitants per square mile (215.3/km^{2}). There were 449 housing units at an average density of 264.1 per square mile (102.0/km^{2}). The racial makeup of the village was 95.6% White, 0.6% African American, 0.7% Native American, 0.5% Asian, 0.1% from other races, and 2.4% from two or more races. Hispanic or Latino of any race were 0.5% of the population.

There were 414 households, of which 30.9% had children under the age of 18 living with them, 33.3% were married couples living together, 15.2% had a female householder with no husband present, 6.3% had a male householder with no wife present, and 45.2% were non-families. 35.7% of all households were made up of individuals, and 16.6% had someone living alone who was 65 years of age or older. The average household size was 2.29 and the average family size was 3.00.

The median age in the village was 34.9 years. 26.3% of residents were under the age of 18; 9.7% were between the ages of 18 and 24; 26.1% were from 25 to 44; 23% were from 45 to 64; and 15.1% were 65 years of age or older. The gender makeup of the village was 48.3% male and 51.7% female.

=== 2000 census ===
As of the census of 2000, there were 865 people, 343 households, and 218 families living in the village. The population density was 558.6 people per square mile (215.5/km^{2}). There were 361 housing units at an average density of 233.1 per square mile (89.9/km^{2}). The racial makeup of the village was 96.99% White, 0.58% African American, 0.58% Native American, 1.27% Asian, 0.12% from other races, and 0.46% from two or more races. Hispanic or Latino of any race were 1.50% of the population.

There were 343 households, out of which 33.5% had children under the age of 18 living with them, 49.3% were married couples living together, 11.1% had a female householder with no husband present, and 36.2% were non-families. 30.6% of all households were made up of individuals, and 12.2% had someone living alone who was 65 years of age or older. The average household size was 2.45 and the average family size was 3.09.

In the village, the population was spread out, with 27.9% under the age of 18, 7.7% from 18 to 24, 30.1% from 25 to 44, 19.2% from 45 to 64, and 15.1% who were 65 years of age or older. The median age was 35 years. For every 100 females, there were 92.7 males. For every 100 females age 18 and over, there were 93.2 males.

The median income for a household in the village was $32,560, and the median income for a family was $39,375. Males had a median income of $31,838 versus $21,736 for females. The per capita income for the village was $15,317. About 4.1% of families and 7.9% of the population were below the poverty line, including 9.3% of those under age 18 and 14.6% of those age 65 or over.

== Notable people ==
- Philip B. Gordon, Roman Catholic priest
- William Nordeen, United States diplomat

== Education ==
- Unity School District
