= Eleftherios Papadimitriou =

Greek politician

Member of the Greek parliament
- In office 1981–1993
- Constituency: Arta

Personal details
- Education: National and Kapodistrian University of Athens LLB(Hons) in Law, Athens University of Economics and Business BA(Hons) in Economics, New York University (NYU) MA(Cum Laude) in Economics.

Eleftherios Papadimitriou (Greek: Ελευθέριος Παπαδημητρίου), born December 1948 is a Greek politician, lawyer and economist.

An active honorary member of the New Democracy (ND) party, he served as a representative in the Greek Parliament from 1981 to 1993. He is a centrist democrat.

On 21 December 1992, he was attacked by two members of the terrorist group 17N.

== Professional career ==
Papadimitriou is a lawyer and the founder of a law firm based in Athens, practicing law since 1976.

He was a litigator in cases such as, the 17N trial in 2003, as well as, representing the municipality of Kommeno, concerning the Nazi massacre in 1943, before the Greek Supreme Special Court (exterritoriality jus cogens), for crimes against humanity in WWII (German reparation claims).

== Member of parliament ==
He was elected a member of the Greek Parliament for Arta representing the New Democracy party, on 18 October 1981. He was subsequently re-elected on 2 June 1985, 5 November 1989, and 8 April 1990.

During his parliamentary tenure, he served as president of the parliament’s Standing Committee on Economic Affairs, deputy secretary general of the ND party parliamentary group (caucus), member of the Parliamentary Assembly to NATO, and member of the Parliamentary Assembly to the Council of Europe.

== Attack by the 17N terrorist group ==
Papadimitriou's life was threatened in December 1992, when he was the target of an attack by the terrorist group 17N. He was shot five times.
