= William Nordeen =

US Navy officer and terrorist victim (1936–1988)

William Edward Nordeen (October 9, 1936 – June 28, 1988) was a US Navy captain and diplomat. Born in Amery, Wisconsin and raised in nearby Centuria, he was the United States defense and naval attaché to the U.S. Embassy in Athens, Greece. Nordeen was killed in Greece by a bomb set off by far-left anti-imperialist urban guerrilla group 17 November due to his involvement in the US Navy and the US embassy in Greece.

== Death ==
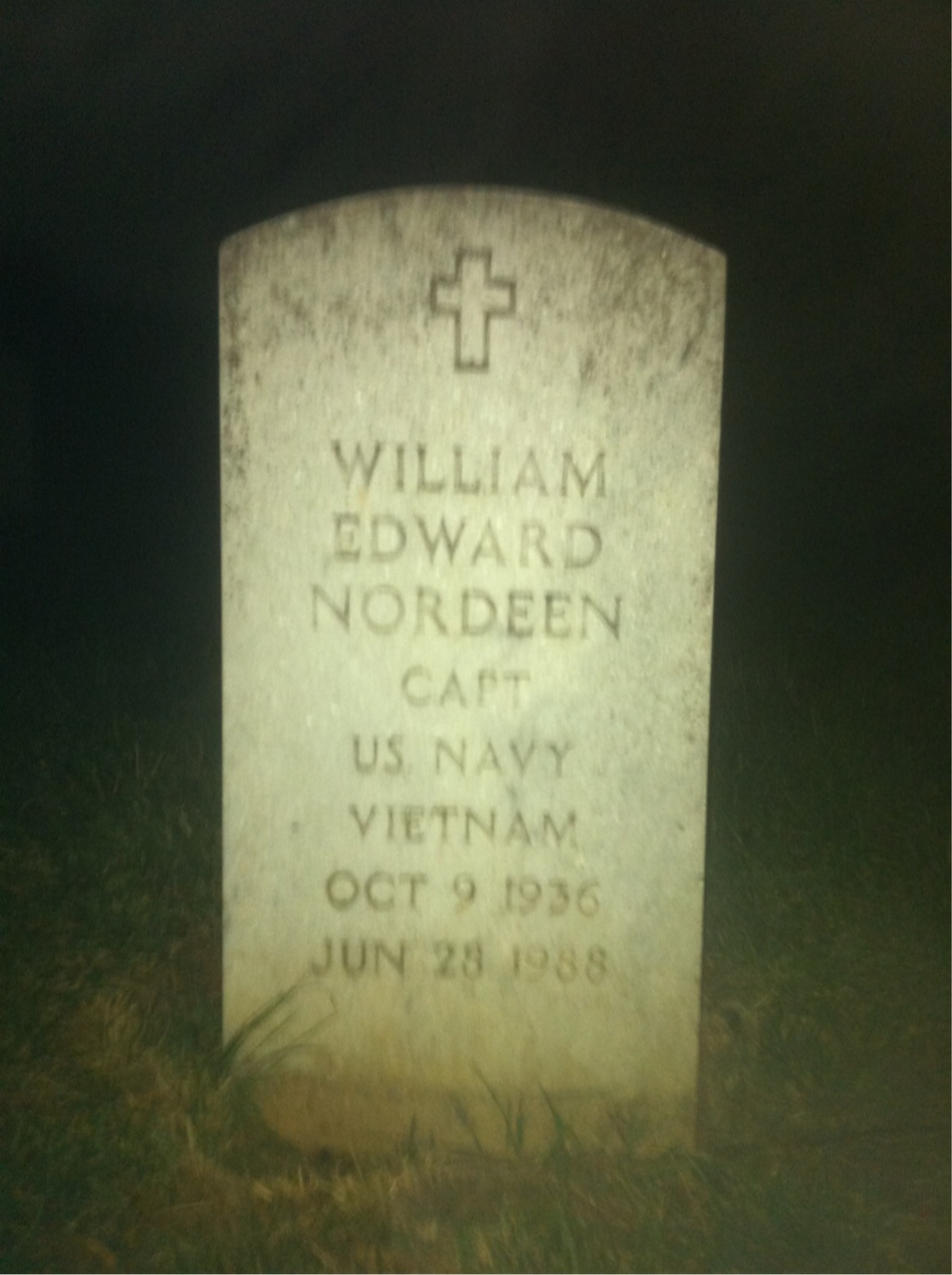
Grave at Arlington National Cemetery

The 51-year-old US Navy captain was driving in an armor-plated sedan near Athens when a car bomb was detonated next to him via remote control. He was thrown from the car and killed by the blast. He was buried at Arlington National Cemetery, in Arlington, Virginia.

The Greek urban guerrilla Marxist organization 17 November claimed the blast, making Nordeen one of five American embassy employees killed by the organization.
