= To Pontiki =

Greek weekly newspaper

To Pontiki (Greek: Το Ποντίκι, "The Mouse") is a Greek weekly newspaper published by Antonis Delatolas. It is mainly satirical/political. Its policy direction is on the centre-left.

It was founded by Costas Papaioannou, who died on 4 March 2022.
