= Conditional release =

Form of parole

Conditional release is a method of release from detention that is contingent upon obeying conditions under threat of return to detention under reduced due process protections.

When applicable in the context of post-conviction detention, unconditional release can be a synonym of parole.

Suspects may also receive a conditional release from investigative detention. In many jurisdictions this can be synonymous with release under investigation (RUI), in the UK, or judicial interim release in Canada.

== In a psychiatric setting ==
Conditional release can also be used as a less restrictive alternative to hospitalizing psychiatric patients.

== See also ==
- Suspended sentence
