= Revolutionary Organization 17 November =

Greek urban guerrilla organization (1975–2002)

- Επαναστατική Οργάνωση 17 Νοέμβρη
- Flag of 17N
- Leader: Alexandros Giotopoulos
- Founded: 23 December 1975
- Dates active: 1975–2002
- Dissolved: 18 July 2002
- Country: Greece
- Active regions: Greece
- Ideology: Communism; Marxism–Leninism; Guevarism; Foco theory; Left-wing nationalism; Revolutionary socialism
- Political position: Far-left
- Status: Defunct

Revolutionary Organization 17 November (Greek: Επαναστατική Οργάνωση 17 Νοέμβρη, Epanastatiki Organosi dekaefta Noemvri), also known as 17N or the 17 November Group, was a Greek Marxist–Leninist urban guerrilla organization. It is named after the Athens Polytechnic uprising. Formed in 1975 and led by Alexandros Giotopoulos, 17N conducted an extensive urban guerrilla campaign of left-wing violence against the Greek state, banks, and businesses. The organization committed 103 known armed robberies, assassinations, and bombing attacks, during which 23 people were killed.

The organization is known for targeting American, British and other foreign diplomats and military personnel, particularly in retribution against the United States for its support of the 1967 coup d'état resulting in the military dictatorship known as the Regime of the Colonels. Their demands have included the removal of American military bases in Greece, the removal of Turkish military forces from Northern Cyprus and the withdrawal of Greece from NATO and the European Union. The Encyclopedia of Terrorism describes them as "a durable, lethal and successful group" who evaded authorities for over 25 years. According to a 2026 documentary by Alexis Papachelas for SKAI TV, FBI officials described 17N as the most successful and effective guerrilla group in the West during the 1990s.

== Attacks ==
17N's first attack, on 23 December 1975, was against the U.S. Central Intelligence Agency's station chief in Athens, Richard Welch. Welch was gunned down outside his residence by three assailants, in front of his wife and driver. 17N's repeated claims of responsibility were ignored until 25 December 1976, when it subsequently murdered the former Intelligence Chief of the Greek security police, Evangelos Mallios, convicted of torturing political prisoners during the dictatorship, and left "scattered leaflets" at the scene claiming responsibility for the 1975 Welch murder. 17N used two M1911 pistols in these killings.

After their first attack against the CIA station chief, the group tried to get mainstream newspapers to publish their manifesto. Their first proclamation, claiming the murder of Richard Welch, was first sent to Libération in Paris, France. It was given to the publisher of Libération via the offices of Jean-Paul Sartre.

One of their demands was the removal of US military bases from Greece. When the Greek Prime Minister Andreas Papandreou renewed the US base agreement, 17N responded to the perceived betrayal by attempting to assassinate US Master Sergeant Robert Judd, firing five rounds at him while his car was stopped in traffic. They issued a communique after the attack: "American Imperialists, The people do not want you! Take your bases and go!"

Police suspected the group of using a stolen anti-armor rocket to attack a downtown branch of the American Citibank in April 1998. The attack caused damage but no injuries, as the warhead did not explode. The rocket was fired by remote control from a private car parked outside the bank on Drossopoulou Street in the downtown district of Kypseli.

A British defence attaché, Brigadier Stephen Saunders, was shot and killed on 8 June 2000 by two men on motorbikes as he drove to work in Kifissia, Athens. CIA's John Kiriakou was claimed to be the initial target, but his US-issued armored vehicle redirected 17N toward Saunders.

=== Victims ===
17N's known murdered (23) and injured victims include:

Name	Date	Profession	Notes
Richard Welch	23 December 1975	CIA station chief in Athens.	shot dead outside his residence
Evangelos Mallios	14 December 1976	Police officer who was accused of torturing political prisoners during the period of military junta.	shot dead
Pantelis Petrou	16 January 1980	Deputy commander of the Greek police Riot Control Unit M.A.T	shot dead in his car
Sotiris Stamoulis	16 January 1980	driver of Pantelis Petrou	
George Tsantes	15 November 1983	US Navy Captain, High level executive of JUSMAGG(Joint US Military Advisory Group)	shot dead in his car
Nikos Veloutsos	15 November 1983	driver of George Tsantes	
Robert H. Judd	3 April 1984	US army Master Sergeant. Postal officer for JUSMAGG in Greece	wounded in an assassination attempt.
Christos Matis	24 December 1984	police guard	shot dead during a bank robbery.
Nikos Momferatos	21 February 1985	publisher of the Apogevmatini right-wing newspaper	shot dead in his car
Georgios Roussetis	21 February 1985	driver of Nikos Momferatos	shot dead in his car
Nikolaos Georgakopoulos	26 November 1985	Riot police officer	killed in bus bombing.
Dimitrios Aggelopoulos	8 April 1986	President of the board of Halyvourgiki S.A.	shot dead while walking
Zacharias Kapsalakis	4 February 1987	doctor and clinic owner	shot in the legs.
Alexander Athanasiadis	1 March 1988	industrialist	shot dead in his car.
William Nordeen	28 June 1988	US Navy captain	killed by a car bomb.
Constantinos Androulidakis	10 January 1989	public prosecutor	shot in both legs and died of complications.
Panayiotis Tarasouleas	18 January 1989	public prosecutor	shot in both legs.
Giorgos Petsos	8 May 1989	PASOK MP and Minister	injured in his car by a car bomb.
Pavlos Bakoyannis	26 September 1989	New Democracy MP	shot and killed outside his office over alleged links to George Koskotas.
Ronald O. Stewart	13 March 1991	US Air Force Staff Sergeant	killed by a bomb planted near his apartment.
Deniz Bölükbaşı	16 June 1991	Turkish Chargé d'Affaires	injured by a car bomb.
Çetin Görgü	7 October 1991	Turkish Press attaché	shot dead.
Yiannis Varis	2 November 1991	police officer	killed in a missile and hand grenade attack against a riot squad bus
Athanasios Axarlian	14 June 1992	student	killed by shrapnel during a rocket attack targeting the limousine of Finance Minister Ioannis Palaiokrassas.
Eleftherios Papadimitriou	21 December 1992	New Democracy party deputy and MP	shot in both legs.
Michael Vranopoulos	24 January 1994	former governor of the National Bank of Greece.	shot dead outside his office
Ömer Haluk Sipahioğlu	4 July 1994	counselor of the Turkish Embassy in Athens.	shot dead outside his apartment building.
Kostis Peraticos	28 May 1997	owner of Eleusis Shipyards.	Shot by three masked individuals whilst leaving his company offices in Piraeus.
Stephen Saunders	8 June 2000	military attaché of the British Embassy in Athens.	Shot dead in his car by two assassins on a motorbike whilst on the way to work.

== Trial ==
The trial of 19 individuals suspected of involvement with 17N commenced in Athens on 3 March 2003, with Christos Lambrou serving as the lead prosecutor for the Greek state. Because of the 20-year statute of limitations, crimes committed before 1984 (such as the killing of the CIA station chief) could not be tried by the court. On 8 December, fifteen of the accused, including Giotopoulos and Koufontinas, were found guilty; another four defendants were acquitted for lack of evidence. The convicted members were sentenced on 17 December 2003. All those convicted defendants appealed. On 3 May 2007, the convictions were upheld.

== Prison ==
In January 2014, Christodoulos Xiros, one of the imprisoned leaders of the organization, escaped from prison. On 6 January, he failed to report to the police after leaving prison under the condition to report to the police every day, which he did six times in 18 months. He was taken into custody while riding a bicycle in the southern suburb of Anavyssos in January 2015.

In 2018 the group's alleged hitman, Dimitris Koufontinas, was moved from Korydallos Prison to a low security agricultural facility after the prison council approved his parole request, citing exemplary behaviour.

=== 2021 hunger strike ===
On 8 January 2021, at 63 years of age, Koufontinas entered a hunger strike with the demand of transfer to Korydallos Prison after being sent to a high security prison in Domokos. On 22 February whilst in intensive care at Lamia Hospital Koufontinas started to reject water and medical care, forcibly removing a catheter from his arm before the courts issued an order to force feed the prisoner a few days later, a practice condemned by many, including a Greek union of doctors, as torture. It was reported that on 5 March, Koufontinas had to be resuscitated due to kidney failure. Koufontinas ended his hunger strike on 14 March after 65 days, despite his demands not being met.

Street demonstrations were held in multiple cities across Greece as well as attacks against property has been claimed in support of Koufontinas, including a demonstration outside of president Katerina Sakellaropoulou's home and vandalism of buildings belonging to Action 24 TV station and the office of Education Minister Niki Kerameus with paint and projectiles by multiple groups of protesters. Other left-wing activists have shown support for Koufontinas, including Miguel Urbán, a co-founder of Podemos, and political filmmaker Costa-Gavras.

=== Release of Giotopoulos ===
On 21 May 2026, Alexandros Giotopoulos, by then 82 years old, was released after on parole from Korydallos high-security prison in Athens, before being sent back to prison in June after the Supreme Court overturned the decision, arguing that Giotopoulos must serve the minimum of 25 years, having, as of the ruling, served 24 years. The decision lead to 'intense' legal debate.

==== International opposition ====
The United States State Department objected to the release of Giotopoulos, releasing a press conference in which they expressed 'disappointment', and called on the Greek state to return him to prison for historic attacks against US personnel in Greece committed by 17N, stating that, "On May 25, the Deputy Prosecutor of the Supreme Court filed an appeal against the conditional release decision, as Giotopoulos had not served the minimum required time. We strongly support these efforts and urge the Greek government to do everything possible to ensure Giotopoulos returns to prison." The Turkish state also condemned the release in relation to the various attacks and assassinations against Turkish officials through the early 90's.

== Theories ==
Some Greek officials considered Revolutionary Struggle (EA), the group that fired a Chinese-made RPG-7 rocket-propelled grenade at the U.S. Embassy in Athens in January 2007, to be a spin-off of 17N. However, three self-admitted EA members arrested in April 2010 claimed that they were anarchists—a designation 17N rejected in its proclamations.

For many years, leading politicians of the right-wing New Democracy party, CIA and FBI agents, as well as the conservative press, falsely claimed that Prime Minister Andreas Papandreou was the mastermind behind 17N. American officials also consistently promoted false narratives linking 17N to PASOK, implying that the party was unwilling to investigate the organisation because of its alleged ties to it. Virginia Tsouderou, who became Deputy Foreign Minister in the Konstantinos Mitsotakis government, and journalist Georgios Karatzaferis (later the founder and leader of a right-wing party, LAOS) claimed that "terrorism in Greece was controlled by Papandreou-affiliated officers of Hellenic National Intelligence Service" (the Greek security and intelligence service), and falsely named Kostas Tsimas (then head of the Intelligent Service) and Colonel Ioannis Sotiris Alexakis as two of the supposed controllers of 17N.

After the arrest of 17N members, the only connection identified between the organisation and PASOK was that Dimitris Koufontinas had been a member of PAMK (Panellinia Agonistiki Mathitiki Kinisi, Panhellenic Militant Pupil's Movement), PASOK's militant high school student organisation, and had admired Andreas Papandreou in his late teens.

Other writers have also claimed that 17N may have been a tool of foreign secret services. In December 2005, Kleanthis Grivas published an article in To Proto Thema, a Greek Sunday newspaper, in which he accused "Sheepskin", the Greek branch of Gladio, NATO's stay-behind paramilitary organization during the Cold War, of the 1975 assassination of Welch as well as of the 2000 assassination of Saunders. This was denied by the US State Department, which responded that "the Greek terrorist organization '17 November' was responsible for both assassinations", and asserted that Grivas' central piece of evidence had been the Westmoreland Field Manual, which the State Department as well as a Congressional inquiry, had dismissed as a Soviet forgery. The State Department also highlighted the fact that, in the case of Richard Welch, "Grivas bizarrely accuses the CIA of playing a role in the assassination of one of its own senior officials" as well as the Greek government's statements to the effect that the "stay behind" network had been dismantled in 1988.

== See also ==
- Greece–United Kingdom relations
- Greece–United States relations
- Greek junta, "Regime of the Colonels" (1967–1974)
- Metapolitefsi, transition to democracy in Greece after 1974
- Conspiracy of Fire Nuclei
- Revolutionary Struggle
- Terrorism in Greece
