= Deaths in September 2022 =

The following is a list of notable deaths in September 2022.

Entries for each day are listed alphabetically by surname. A typical entry lists information in the following sequence:

- Name, age, country of citizenship at birth, subsequent country of citizenship (if applicable), reason for notability, cause of death (if known), and reference.

== September 2022 ==
=== 1 ===
- Mahmoud Ahmadzadeh, 89, Iranian engineer and politician, minister of industries and mines (1979–1980).
- Abdullah Al-Kibsi, Yemeni politician.
- Guy-Pierre Baumann, 82, French chef and restaurateur, owner of the Kammerzell House (1987–2009).
- Ken Box, 91, British Olympic sprinter.
- Jakez Cornou, 87, French historian and ethnologist.
- John Dapcevich, 95, American politician, mayor of Sitka, Alaska (1971–1975, 1979–1985, 1987–1989).
- Barbara Ehrenreich, 81, American author (Nickel and Dimed, Bait and Switch, Dancing in the Streets) and political activist, stroke.
- John Gamble, 74, American baseball player (Detroit Tigers).
- Bo Harwood, 76, American sound engineer (Felicity, Six Feet Under, Pee-wee's Playhouse) and composer.
- Albert Hasibuan, 83, Indonesian lawyer and politician, member of the Presidential Advisory Council (2012–2015) and Congress (1971–1997).
- François-Bernard Huyghe, 71, French essayist and political scientist.
- Rashleigh Jackson, 93, Guyanese politician, minister for foreign affairs (1978–1990).
- Ľudovít Komadel, 94, Slovak Olympic swimmer (1952) and sports physician.
- Adam Kułach, 57, Polish diplomat.
- Ravil Maganov, 67, Russian petroleum executive (Lukoil), fall.
- Phillip Mann, 80, British-born New Zealand writer (Master of Paxwax, The Fall of the Families), teacher and theatre director.
- Jack Marchal, 75, French musician, illustrator, and political activist.
- Abbas Maroufi, 65, Iranian writer.
- Diane Noomin, 75, American underground cartoonist and editor (Wimmen's Comix, Twisted Sisters), uterine cancer.
- Claude Pronovost, 87, Canadian ice hockey player (Montreal Canadiens, Boston Bruins).
- Lowell Ross, 90, American politician.
- Mary Roy, 89, Indian educator and women's rights activist.
- David H. Sanford, 84, American philosopher.
- Hermann Schaufler, 75, German politician, member of the Landtag of Baden-Württemberg (1980–2001).
- Earnie Shavers, 78, American boxer.
- István Szalay, 78, Hungarian mathematician and politician, MP (1998–2002).
- Robert L. Vining Jr., 91, American lawyer, judge of the U.S. District Court for Northern Georgia (since 1979).
- Kenneth Wernicke, 89, American aerospace engineer.
- Erna Beth Yackel, 83, American mathematician.
- Yang Yongsong, 103, Chinese military officer.
- Zhu Yinghao, 93, Chinese transformer expert.

=== 2 ===
- Mujib Rahman Ansari, 39–40, Afghan cleric, bombing.
- Bamba Bakya, 41, Indian playback singer, cardiac arrest.
- Denis Berthiaume, 53, Canadian academic and researcher, assisted suicide.
- Mišo Cebalo, 77, Croatian chess grandmaster.
- Jordi Cervelló, 86, Spanish composer, pneumonia.
- Joseph Cheng Tsai-fa, 90, Taiwanese Roman Catholic prelate, bishop of Tainan (1991–2004) and archbishop of Taipei (2004–2007).
- Ian Cockbain, 64, English cricketer (Lancashire).
- Frank Drake, 92, American astronomer and astrophysicist (Drake equation), designer of the Arecibo message.
- Manuel Duarte, 77, Portuguese footballer (Leixões, Sporting CP, national team).
- Peter Eckersley, 44, Australian computer scientist (Let's Encrypt, Privacy Badger, HTTPS Everywhere) and cyber security activist, cancer.
- María Guðmundsdóttir, 29, Icelandic alpine ski racer, primary splenic angiosarcoma.
- Georgios Kalamidas, 77, Greek judge, president of the Supreme Civil and Criminal Court (2009–2011).
- Barry Muir, 84, Australian rugby player (Tweed Heads Seagulls, Queensland, national team).
- Donal O'Keeffe, 59, Irish Gaelic footballer (Clonmel Commercials, Tipperary), injuries sustained cycling accident.
- Léopold Ismael Samba, 76, Central African diplomat.
- T. V. Sankaranarayanan, 77, Indian Carnatic vocalist.
- Ramveer Upadhyay, 65, Indian politician, Uttar Pradesh MLA (since 1996), cancer.
- Drummie Zeb, 62, English reggae musician (Aswad) and record producer.
- Zenno Rob Roy, 22, Japanese Thoroughbred racehorse, heart failure.

=== 3 ===
- Martin Bailie, 60, Irish hurler (Ballygalget).
- Yuri Bashkatov, 54, Moldovan swimmer, Olympic silver medalist (1988, 1992).
- Eva Børresen, 101, German-born Norwegian ceramist.
- Scott Campbell, 65, Canadian ice hockey player (Winnipeg Jets, St. Louis Blues), cancer.
- Fermin Espinosa, 82, Cuban Olympic boxer.
- Alarico Gattia, 94, Italian comic artist and illustrator.
- Jeff German, 69, American journalist (Las Vegas Review-Journal, Las Vegas Sun), stabbed.
- Shavez Hart, 29, Bahamian Olympic sprinter (2016), shot.
- Takanori Hayashi, 84, Japanese politician, member of the House of Representatives (1969–1980).
- Specs Howard, 96, American radio presenter.
- Paddy Kerrigan, 94, Irish Gaelic footballer (Rhode).
- Herbert Kohler Jr., 83, American manufacturing executive, chairman of Kohler Co. (1972–2015).
- Sterling Lord, 102, American literary agent.
- Doug Macdonald, 81, Scottish pilot.
- Dieter Schulte, 82, German trade unionist, chairman of DGB (1994–2002).
- Lester G. Telser, 91, American economist.

=== 4 ===
- Gazi Mazharul Anwar, 79, Bangladeshi film director, producer and lyricist (Nil Akasher Niche, Kokhono Megh Kokhono Brishti, Meyeti Ekhon Kothay Jabe).
- Janusz Batugowski, 74, Polish football player and manager (KSZO Ostrowiec Świętokrzyski).
- Robert Bintz, 92, Luxembourgish Olympic cyclist (1948).
- Bo Brundin, 85, Swedish actor (Tales of the Gold Monkey, The Great Waldo Pepper, Russian Roulette).
- Claus-Frenz Claussen, 83, German physician, academic and artist.
- Coroebus, 3, Irish Thoroughbred racehorse.
- Heidemarie Fischer, 77, German politician, member of the Abgeordnetenhaus of Berlin (1986–1990, 1995–2006).
- Wes Freed, 58, American outsider artist, colorectal cancer.
- Alain Goldmann, 90, French rabbi.
- Rodrigo González Torres, 80, Chilean politician, deputy (since 2002) and mayor of Viña del Mar (1992–1994, 1996–2000).
- Edward Hulewicz, 84, Polish singer and composer.
- Lee Hyung-keun, 57, South Korean Olympic weightlifter.
- Boris Lagutin, 84, Russian boxer, Olympic champion (1964, 1968).
- Helen Matthews Lewis, 97, American sociologist, historian, and activist.
- Cyrus Mistry, 54, Indian-Irish automotive executive, chairman of the Tata Group (2012–2016), traffic collision.
- Ramachandran Mokeri, 75, Indian stage actor, lung disease.
- Arthur Cotton Moore, 87, American architect.
- Hendrik Nielsen, 80, Greenlandic politician, MP (1979–1991).
- Ernst Pfister, 75, German politician, member of the Landtag of Baden-Württemberg (1980–2011).
- Ram Naresh Rawat, 60, Indian politician, Uttar Pradesh MLA (since 2017), liver disease.
- Art Rosenbaum, 83, American visual artist and musician, Grammy winner (2008).
- Isolde Schmitt-Menzel, 92, German artist (Die Sendung mit der Maus), author, and photographer.
- Thorkild Simonsen, 96, Danish politician, minister of the interior (1997–2000) and mayor of Aarhus (1982–1997).
- Pat Stay, 36, Canadian battle rapper, stabbed.
- Peter Straub, 79, American novelist (Julia, Ghost Story, The Talisman), complications from a broken hip.
- John Till, 76, Canadian guitarist (Full Tilt Boogie Band).
- Saint-Ange Vebobe, 69, French basketball player (JA Vichy, Antibes, national team).
- Joel Wells, 86, American football player (Montreal Alouettes, New York Giants).
- Zhan Bingyan, 93, Chinese urologist and politician, member of the National People's Congress (1993–1998).

=== 5 ===
- Gias Uddin Ahmed, 68, Bangladeshi politician, MP (2008–2014).
- Khleif Ayyat, 92, Jordanian Olympic sport shooter.
- Margrith Bigler-Eggenberger, 89, Swiss jurist and politician.
- Patricia Burke Brogan, 90, Irish playwright, novelist, and poet.
- Virginia Dwan, 90, American art collector and patron.
- Hans Eder, 87, German football player (Tennis Borussia Berlin, Hertha BSC) and manager (Hertha BSC).
- Teijirō Furukawa, 87, Japanese politician, sepsis.
- Hermann Gummel, 99, German physicist.
- Merlin Hanbury-Tracy, 7th Baron Sudeley, 83, British peer, member of the House of Lords (1960–1999).
- Shelby Jacobs, 87, American engineer.
- Moon Landrieu, 92, American politician, HUD secretary (1979–1981), mayor of New Orleans (1970–1978), and member of the Louisiana House of Representatives (1960–1966).
- Robin Lesh, 84, Australian tennis player.
- Li Dequn, 77, Chinese material scientist, member of the Chinese Academy of Engineering.
- Li Xiyin, 96, Chinese lexicographer and politician, member of the National People's Congress (1988–1998).
- Mark Littell, 69, American baseball player (Kansas City Royals, St. Louis Cardinals), complications from heart surgery.
- Shirley McKechnie, 96, Australian dancer and choreographer.
- Dale McRaven, 83, American television writer and producer (Perfect Strangers, Mork & Mindy, The Partridge Family), complications from lung cancer.
- Mariella Mehr, 74, Swiss writer.
- Guy Morriss, 71, American football player (Philadelphia Eagles, New England Patriots) and coach (Kentucky), complications from Alzheimer's disease.
- Sizzle Ohtaka, 70, Japanese singer, cancer.
- Jeff Robson, 95, New Zealand badminton and tennis player.
- Walter Suggs, 83, American football player (Houston Oilers).
- Jürgen Theuerkauff, 87, German fencer, Olympic bronze medalist (1960).
- Lars Vogt, 51, German concert pianist, conductor (Orchestre de chambre de Paris) and festival director (Spannungen), cancer.
- Eva Zeller, 99, German poet and novelist.

=== 6 ===
- Olga Andrianova, 70, Russian curler and curling coach.
- Mark H. Ashcraft, 72, American psychologist and academic.
- Salvatore Biasco, 82, Italian economist and politician, deputy (1996–2001).
- Ligia Borowczyk, 89, Polish actress (La Jetée, Goto, Island of Love).
- Mark Buben, 65, American football player (New England Patriots, Cleveland Browns).
- Arvind Giri, 64, Indian politician, Uttar Pradesh MLA (since 1996), heart attack.
- Just Jaeckin, 82, French film director (Emmanuelle, Story of O, Lady Chatterley's Lover), photographer and sculptor.
- Umesh Katti, 61, Indian politician, Karnataka MLA (1985–2004, since 2008), cardiac arrest.
- Vic Kohring, 64, American politician, member of the Alaska House of Representatives (1995–2007), traffic collision.
- Tatyana Koryagina, 79, Russian economist and politician, deputy (1990–1993).
- Roy Littlejohn, 89, English footballer (Bournemouth & Boscombe Athletic, Portsmouth, Woking).
- John McVicar, 82, English robber and journalist, subject of the biopic McVicar, heart attack.
- W. Neal Moerschel, 91, American politician.
- Ronald Pelton, 80, American intelligence analyst (NSA) and convicted spy.
- Fahad Al Rajaan, 73, Kuwaiti banker and convicted embezzler.
- Tina Ramirez, 92, Venezuelan-born American dancer and choreographer.
- Philippe Ranaivomanana, 73, Malagasy Roman Catholic prelate, bishop of Ihosy (1999–2009) and Antsirabe (since 2009).
- Donald E. Rosenblum, 93, American lieutenant general.
- Magdalena Ruiz Guiñazú, 91, Argentine journalist and human rights activist.
- Dan Schachte, 64, American ice hockey linesman (NHL).
- Sydney Shoemaker, 90, American philosopher.
- Earl J. Silbert, 86, American lawyer (Watergate scandal), U.S. attorney for the District of Columbia (1974–1979), aortic dissection.
- Edo Spier, 96, Dutch architect and politician, senator (1991–1995).
- Herman Swaiko, 90, American Orthodox prelate, primate of the Orthodox Church in America (2002–2008).
- Thẩm Thúy Hằng, 82, Vietnamese actress (The Beauty of Binh Duong, Four Oddballs of Saigon).
- Hilda Žīgure, 104, Latvian stage actress.

=== 7 ===
- David A. Arnold, 54, American comedian and television writer (Fuller House, The Rickey Smiley Show, That Girl Lay Lay).
- Emanoel Araújo, 81, Brazilian artist, art curator, and museologist.
- Radoslav Brđanin, 74, Bosnian military officer and convicted war criminal.
- James L. Fisher, 91, American academic administrator and psychologist.
- János Fuzik, 64, Hungarian journalist and politician.
- Anne Garrels, 71, American journalist (NPR, ABC News, NBC News), lung cancer.
- Marsha Hunt, 104, American actress (Pride and Prejudice, Blossoms in the Dust, The Human Comedy).
- Syed Amirul Islam, 86, Bangladeshi jurist, judge of the high court (1994–2007).
- David A. Korn, 92, American diplomat.
- Børge Krogh, 80, Danish Olympic boxer (1960, 1964).
- Dave Lape, 75, American racing driver.
- Willie Losʻe, 55, New Zealand-born Tongan rugby union player (Auckland, North Harbour, Tonga national team) and broadcaster.
- Lance Mackey, 52, American dog musher, four-time Iditarod champion (2007–2010) and Yukon Quest champion (2005–2008), throat cancer.
- Ramchandra Manjhi, 97, Indian folk dancer.
- Anatoliy Molotay, 84, Ukrainian football player (Lokomotyv Vinnytsia) and manager (Dnipro Cherkasy, Dynamo Irpin).
- John O'Neill, 89, Canadian sociologist.
- Valeri Polyakov, 80, Russian cosmonaut (Mir EO-3, Mir EO-4).
- Antonina Popova, 87, Russian Olympic discus thrower.
- Rommy Hunt Revson, 78, American nightclub singer, inventor of the scrunchie, aortic rupture.
- Mose Rison, 66, American football player and coach (Central Michigan Chippewas).
- Dagmar Schipanski, 79, German physicist and politician, member and president of the Landtag of Thuringia (2004–2009).
- Piet Schrijvers, 75, Dutch football player (Ajax, national team) and manager (TOP Oss), complications from Alzheimer's disease.
- Bernard Shaw, 82, American journalist (CNN), pneumonia.
- Alan Wilkins, 52, Scottish playwright.

=== 8 ===
- Martin Barker, 76, British scholar.
- Jens Birkemose, 79, Danish painter.
- Bryan Harvey Bjarnason, 98, Canadian real estate agent and politician, Saskatchewan MLA (1964–1969).
- Marciano Cantero, 62, Argentine singer (Enanitos Verdes).
- Pinya Chuayplod, 82, Thai politician, MP (1979–1992), senator (2000–2006).
- LaDeva Davis, 78, American television host and food educator.
- Ľubomír Dobrík, 70, Slovak judge, member of the Constitutional Court (1997–2016).
- Albert J. Dooley, 92, American politician, member of the South Carolina House of Representatives (1959–1964) and Senate (1971–1976).
- Queen Elizabeth II, 96, British monarch and head of the Commonwealth (since 1952).
- Randall B. Griepp, 82, American cardiothoracic surgeon.
- Cecile Janssens, 54, Dutch epidemiologist, leukemia.
- Bobby Keyes, 79, Australian rugby league player (Eastern Suburbs, Newtown).
- Akbar Ali Khan, 78, Bangladeshi economist.
- Anders Lönnbro, 76, Swedish actor (The Score, 1939, Tjenare kungen).
- Eluki Monga Aundu, 81, Congolese military officer.
- Mavis Nicholson, 91, Welsh writer and broadcaster.
- Paulo Pitta e Cunha, 85, Portuguese lawyer, professor, and politician, deputy (1976–1980).
- Gwyneth Powell, 76, English actress (Grange Hill, Man Down, The Guardians), complications from colon surgery.
- Tim Rutten, 72, American journalist.
- Ted Schreiber, 84, American baseball player (New York Mets).
- Yoel Schwartz, 82, Israeli Haredi rabbi.
- Kamal Narain Singh, 95, Indian jurist, chief justice (1991) and chairman of the law commission (1991–1994).
- Dave Smith, 88, Scottish football player (Burnley, Brighton & Hove Albion) and manager (Plymouth Argyle).
- Susan L. Solomon, 71, American health activist and lawyer.
- Bob Stacey, 72, American attorney.
- Terence Strange, 89, English cricketer.
- Sujay Solomon Sutherson, 41, Singaporean convicted killer and life sentence prisoner.
- Luke Swann, 39, English cricket coach (Northamptonshire).
- Vadim Utkin, 84, Russian-American control theorist and electrical engineer.
- Sonny West, 85, American songwriter ("Oh, Boy!", "Rave On") and musician.

=== 9 ===
- Carol Arnauld, 61, French singer-songwriter.
- James Keith Bain, 92, Australian businessman and author.
- Brother Cleve, 67, American musician and mixologist, heart attack.
- Nicolae Bulat, 70, Moldovan historian, brain cancer.
- Bryan Clark, 93, American actor (Don't Tell Mom the Babysitter's Dead, St. Elsewhere, Murphy Brown).
- Donat Ertel, 74, German Olympic bobsledder.
- Wayne Garfield, 70, American composer and songwriter.
- Jack Ging, 90, American actor (The A-Team, The Eleventh Hour, High Plains Drifter).
- Dennis Guy, 77, Northern Irish footballer (Glenavon, Linfield).
- Shelby Jordan, 70, American football player (New England Patriots, Los Angeles Raiders).
- Harry Kroger, 86, American physicist and electrical engineer.
- Douglas McKeown, 75, American film director (The Deadly Spawn).
- Mark Miller, 97, American actor (Please Don't Eat the Daisies, Guestward, Ho!, Savannah Smiles).
- Pierre Muller, 70, Swiss politician, mayor of Geneva (1999–2000, 2004–2005).
- James Polshek, 92, American architect (Clinton Presidential Center, Brooklyn Museum).
- Ray Rippelmeyer, 89, American baseball player (Washington Senators) and coach (Philadelphia Phillies).
- Herschel Sizemore, 87, American bluegrass mandolinist.
- Robert Hitchcock Spain, 96, American United Methodist bishop.
- Clive Tanner, 88, British-born Canadian politician, British Columbia MLA (1991–1996).
- Trevor Tomkins, 81, British jazz drummer (Gilgamesh).

=== 10 ===
- Paulino Bernal, 83, American accordionist and Christian evangelist.
- Menno Boelsma, 61, Dutch Olympic speed skater (1988).
- Mario Bortolotto, 65, Australian footballer (Geelong, Carlton).
- Frank Cignetti Sr., 84, American Hall of Fame college football coach (IUP Crimson Hawks, West Virginia Mountaineers).
- Jorja Fleezanis, 70, American violinist.
- Feargus Flood, 94, Irish judge.
- Dick Gradley, 90, British Olympic gymnast (1960).
- Eric Jones, 51, American comic book artist (Little Gloomy).
- William Klein, 96, American-born French photographer, film director, and screenwriter (Who Are You, Polly Maggoo?, Mr. Freedom, The Model Couple).
- B. B. Lal, 101, Indian archaeologist, director general of the ASI (1968–1972).
- Maximilian Lerner, 98, Austrian-born American intelligence soldier (Ritchie Boys).
- Bubba Monroe, 61, American professional wrestler.
- Joseph Nacua, 77, Filipino Roman Catholic prelate, bishop of Ilagan (2008–2017).
- Ilja Seifert, 71, German politician, MP (1990–1994, 1998–2002, 2005–2013).
- Henri Stierlin, 94, Egyptian-born Swiss journalist and writer.
- Choichi Terukina, 90, Japanese Ryukyuan musician.
- Väinö Vilponiemi, 96, Finnish politician, MP (1962–1975).
- Martin Wemyss, 94, English rear admiral.

=== 11 ===
- Roger Bamber, 78, British photojournalist, lung cancer.
- Jean Bock, 91, Belgian politician, senator (1995–1999) and mayor of Gouvy (1983–2004).
- Muhammad Ali Chamseddine, 79, Lebanese writer and poet.
- Syeda Sajeda Chowdhury, 87, Bangladeshi politician, MP (since 2008), complications from COVID-19.
- Ruth Jean Dale, 83, American author.
- Dick Eckaus, 96, American economist.
- Malcolm Erskine, 17th Earl of Buchan, 92, Scottish peer, member of the House of Lords (1984–1999).
- David E. Grange Jr., 97, American military officer.
- Jadour Haddou, 73, Moroccan Olympic runner.
- Joe Hart, 78, American politician, Arizona State Mine Inspector (2007–2021) and member of the Arizona House of Representatives (1992–2001).
- Florin Hidișan, 40, Romanian footballer (Otopeni, UTA Arad, Pandurii Târgu Jiu), stomach cancer.
- Ken Howard, 89, British artist, complications from a fall.
- William D. Hyslop, 71, American lawyer, U.S. attorney for the Eastern District of Washington (1991–1993, 2019–2021).
- Tadashi Kume, 91, Japanese businessman.
- Harry Landis, 95, British actor (EastEnders, Friday Night Dinner, Bitter Victory) and stage director, cancer.
- Kim Lenaghan, 61, Northern Irish journalist and radio presenter (BBC Radio Ulster).
- Javier Marías, 70, Spanish novelist (A Heart So White, Tomorrow in the Battle Think on Me, Dark Back of Time), complications from pneumonia.
- W. David McIntyre, 90, British-born New Zealand historian.
- Sonia Handelman Meyer, 102, American photographer.
- Damian Mymryk, 74, Ukrainian stonemason, stone carver and artist of vytynanka.
- John W. O'Malley, 95, American historian and Jesuit priest.
- Nelson Oñate, 79, Cuban Olympic sport shooter (1968).
- Page Pate, 55, American attorney, drowned.
- Donald Pigott, 94, British botanist.
- Krishnam Raju, 82, Indian actor (Dharmaatmudu, Bobbili Brahmanna) and politician, MP (1998–2004), complications from COVID-19.
- Roland Reber, 68, German film director (The Truth of Lie, 24/7: The Passion of Life) and author.
- Joyce Reynolds, 103, British classicist and academic.
- Swaroopanand Saraswati, 98, Indian religious leader, shankaracharya of Dwarka Sharada Peetham (since 1982), heart attack.
- Roy Schmidt, 80, American football player (New Orleans Saints, Atlanta Falcons, Washington Redskins).
- Alain Tanner, 92, Swiss film director (Charles, Dead or Alive, Jonah Who Will Be 25 in the Year 2000, In the White City) and screenwriter.
- Elias Theodorou, 34, Canadian mixed martial artist, colon cancer.
- Ahmet Toptaş, 73, Turkish politician, MP (2011–2015), lymphoma.
- Gocha R. Tsetskhladze, 59, Soviet-born British archaeologist.
- Anthony Varvaro, 37, American baseball player (Seattle Mariners, Atlanta Braves, Boston Red Sox), traffic collision.
- Steven Zelditch, 68, American mathematician.

=== 12 ===
- Harry Booth, 82, American college basketball and baseball coach (Saint Joseph's Hawks).
- Ken Brownlee, 87, Scottish footballer (Aberdeen, Third Lanark, Boksburg), heart failure.
- Radu Ciuceanu, 94, Romanian historian and politician, deputy (1990–1992, 2000–2004).
- Michael DeGroote, 89, Belgian-born Canadian businessman and philanthropist.
- Dennis East, 73, South African singer (Stingray), songwriter and record producer, stroke.
- Vadim Filimonov, 91, Russian legal scholar and politician, deputy (1993–1999).
- Jimmy Flynn, 88, American teamster and actor (Good Will Hunting, The Cider House Rules).
- Efraín Forero Triviño, 92, Colombian road racing cyclist.
- Britt Hildeng, 79, Norwegian politician, MP (1997–2009).
- Hannelore Hradez, 81, Austrian Olympic fencer.
- Ramsey Lewis, 87, American jazz pianist ("The 'In' Crowd"), composer and radio personality (WNUA), Grammy winner (1966, 1967, 1974).
- Lowry Mays, 87, American mass media executive, co-founder of Clear Channel Communications.
- Akio Miyazawa, 65, Japanese playwright, heart failure.
- Ryuji Mizuno, 70, Japanese voice actor (Naruto, Berserk, Virtua Fighter), sepsis.
- Eric Pianka, 83, American herpetologist and evolutionary ecologist.
- PnB Rock, 30, American rapper ("Selfish"), shot.
- Oleksandr Shapoval, 48, Ukrainian ballet dancer, shelling.
- Rimantas Šidlauskas, 60, Lithuanian diplomat.
- Stephen Webre, 75, American historian.
- Henry Rupert Wilhoit Jr., 87, American lawyer, judge of the U.S. District Court for Eastern Kentucky (since 1981).
- Shahpour Zarnegar, 93, Iranian Olympic fencer (1964).
- Spiros Zournatzis, 86, Greek journalist and politician, MEP (1989).

=== 13 ===
- Heiderose Berroth, 75, German politician, member of the Landtag of Baden-Württemberg (1996–2011).
- Fred Callaghan, 77, English football player (Fulham) and manager (Woking, Brentford).
- Jack Charles, 79, Australian actor (The Chant of Jimmie Blacksmith, Blackfellas, Tom White) and musician, stroke.
- Bertha Espinoza Segura, 64, Mexican politician, deputy (since 2018), cancer.
- Sarah Ferguson, 80, Jersey politician.
- Fred Franzia, 79, American winemaker (Bronco Wine Company).
- Jean-Luc Godard, 91, French-Swiss film director (Breathless, Bande à part, Pierrot le Fou), screenwriter and critic, assisted suicide.
- Brian Hewson, 89, English Olympic middle-distance runner (1956, 1960).
- George Hurst, 89, American leatherworker.
- N. M. Joseph, 78, Indian politician, Kerala MLA (1987–1991).
- Theophilos Kamberidis, 92, Greek politician, MP (1964–1967) and mayor of Katerini (1987–1990).
- Kostas Kazakos, 87, Greek actor (Act of Reprisal, Bullets don't come back, The Man with the Carnation).
- Tessa Keswick, 79, British policy analyst.
- Kornelije Kovač, 80, Serbian composer and musician (Korni Grupa, Indexi).
- Werner Loewe, 81, German politician, member of the Hamburg Parliament (1978–1986).
- Roxanne Lowit, 80, American fashion photographer.
- Don Marquis, 86, American philosopher.
- Grzegorz Matuszak, 81, Polish sociologist and politician, senator (2001–2005).
- Abderrahmane Mehdaoui, 72, Algerian footballer (WA Tlemcen, DRB Tadjenanet, national team).
- Joe Patton, 50, American football player (Washington Redskins).
- Jesse Powell, 51, American R&B singer ("All I Need", "I Wasn't with It", "You"), cardiac arrest.
- Jim Russell, 76, American journalist and radio producer, complications from a fall.
- Faisal Saif, 46, Indian film director (Jigyaasa, Main Hoon Part-Time Killer, Paanch Ghantey Mien Paanch Crore), multiple organ failure.
- Ken Starr, 76, American lawyer (Whitewater controversy), judge of the U.S. Court of Appeals for the D.C. Circuit (1983–1989) and solicitor general (1989–1993), complications from surgery.
- Suh Dae-sook, 90, North Korean biographer.
- Toshiko Taira, 101, Japanese textile artist.
- Fletcher Thompson, 97, American lawyer and politician, member of the U.S. House of Representatives (1967–1973) and Georgia Senate (1965–1967).
- Pierre Tournier, 88, French football player (SO Montpellier, FC Rouen) and manager (US Saint-Malo).
- Gabrielle Upton, 101, Canadian-born American screenwriter (Gidget, The Loretta Young Show, The Virginian) and actress.

=== 14 ===
- Horacio Accavallo, 87, Argentine boxer, WBA and WBC flyweight champion (1966–1968).
- Aram Bakshian, 78, American political aide and speechwriter, White House director of speechwriting (1981–1983).
- Jack Brogan, 92, American art fabricator.
- Cal Browning, 84, American baseball player (St. Louis Cardinals).
- Kevin Cahill, 86, American physician.
- Géza Csapó, 71, Hungarian canoeist, Olympic silver medallist (1976).
- Ken Douglas, 86, New Zealand trade unionist, president of the NZCTU (1987–1999).
- Anton Fier, 66, American drummer (The Feelies, The Golden Palominos, Bob Mould), composer and producer, assisted suicide.
- Bengt Gingsjö, 70, Swedish Olympic swimmer (1972, 1976).
- Shah Moazzem Hossain, 83, Bangladeshi politician, MP (1991–1995).
- Lothar Hübner, 66, German politician, member of the Landtag of Bavaria (1994).
- Bill James, 92, American politician.
- Adam Kendon, 88, British linguist and semiotician.
- Reinelde Knapp, 89, Austrian Olympic high jumper.
- Naresh Kumar, 93, Indian tennis player.
- Li Qiwan, 86–87, Chinese politician, member of the National People's Congress (1983–1988).
- Robert P. Maginnis, 88, American Roman Catholic prelate, auxiliary bishop of Philadelphia (1996–2010).
- José Marcelino. 72, Brazilian Olympic volleyball player.
- Louis-Michel Nourry, 76, French historian.
- Mariano Ondo, 23, Equatoguinean footballer (Cano Sport, Shkupi, national team), cardiac arrest.
- Dimitrios Pandermalis, 82, Greek archaeologist and curator (Acropolis Museum).
- Irene Papas, 93, Greek actress (Zorba the Greek, The Guns of Navarone, Z) and singer, complications from Alzheimer's disease.
- Park Byeong-yun, 81, South Korean politician, member of the National Assembly (2000–2004).
- Bill Pearl, 91, American bodybuilder.
- Rubén Placanica, 79, Argentine Olympic cyclist (1964), COVID-19.
- Jim Post, 82, American singer (Friend & Lover) and songwriter ("Reach Out of the Darkness").
- Jeff Pyle, 58, American politician, member of the Pennsylvania House of Representatives (2005–2021), kidney cancer.
- Andy Romano, 86, American actor (Under Siege, Major League, Hill Street Blues).
- Yadollah Royaee, 90, Iranian poet.
- Paul Sartin, 51, English folk singer, musician (Bellowhead, Faustus, Belshazzar's Feast) and composer.
- Jim Shackleton, 82, Scottish rugby union player.
- Henry Silva, 95, American actor (Ocean's 11, The Manchurian Candidate, Ghost Dog: The Way of the Samurai).
- Vladimir Sungorkin, 68, Russian journalist and media manager.
- P. S. Thiruvengadam, 87, Indian politician, Tamil Nadu MLA (1977–1984, 1987–1991, 1996–2001).
- Don Tregonning, 93, Australian tennis player and coach.
- Michel Verschueren, 91, Belgian businessman and sporting director, manager of R.S.C. Anderlecht (1981–2003).
- Arnold Vitarbo, 86, American Olympic sport shooter (1968).
- Erwin Vogt, 90, Swiss Olympic sport shooter.
- David Wakefield, 86, English rugby league player (Wakefield Trinity, Doncaster).
- Mária Wittner, 85, Hungarian revolutionary and politician, MP (2006–2014).
- Zhang Chuanmiao, 85, Chinese military officer and politician, member of the National People's Congress (1993–1998).

=== 15 ===
- Brian Binnie, 69, American commercial astronaut (SpaceShipOne flight 17P).
- Eddie Butler, 65, Welsh rugby union player (British & Irish Lions, Barbarian F.C., national team), commentator and journalist.
- Bob Christiansen, 87, American geologist.
- Gopanarayan Das, 74, Indian advocate and politician, MLA, cardiac arrest.
- Françoise Dupuy, 97, French dancer and choreographer.
- Jörg Faerber, 93, German conductor (Württemberg Chamber Orchestra Heilbronn).
- Robert Ferrante, 87, American news producer.
- Tibor Frank, 74, Hungarian historian, member of the Hungarian Academy of Sciences.
- Liam Holden, 68, Northern Irish victim of a miscarriage of justice.
- Sam Howe, 84, American squash player, complications from an infection.
- Axel Jodorowsky, 57, Mexican-French actor (Santa Sangre, The Dance of Reality).
- Thomas Jung, 64, German lawyer and politician, member of the Landtag of Brandenburg (2014–2019).
- Saul Kripke, 81, American philosopher and logician.
- Earle Labor, 94, American literary scholar.
- Diana Maggi, 97, Italian-born Argentine actress (Frontera Sur, The Bohemian Soul, Campeón a la fuerza).
- Francescantonio Nolè, 74, Italian Roman Catholic prelate, bishop of Tursi-Lagonegro (2000–2015) and archbishop of Cosenza-Bisignano (since 2015).
- Maanu Paul, 83, New Zealand Māori leader.
- Stanley Pettigrew, 95, Irish painter.
- Fritz Pleitgen, 84, German journalist and author, director of WDR (1995–2007), president of the German Cancer Aid (2011–2021) and head of the EBU (2006–2008), pancreatic cancer.
- Radko Polič, 80, Slovenian actor (The Widowhood of Karolina Žašler, Balkan Express, Silent Gunpowder).
- Asad Rauf, 66, Pakistani cricket player (National Bank of Pakistan, Lahore) and umpire, cardiac arrest.
- Jeanne Renaud, 94, Canadian choreographer.
- Mykhailo Rodionov, 85, Ukrainian politician, people's deputy (2002–2006).
- Alois Roppert, 88, Austrian politician, MP (1979–1994).
- Anatoliy Smirnov, 80, Russian politician.
- John Stearns, 71, American baseball player and coach (New York Mets), cancer.
- Svend Studsgaard, 75, Danish Olympic wrestler (1980).
- Samy Vellu, 86, Malaysian politician, minister of works (1979–1989, 1995–2008) and MP (1974–2008).
- Dennis Virkler, 80, American film editor (The Fugitive, The Hunt for Red October, Batman Forever), heart failure.

=== 16 ===
- Heinz Allenspach, 94, Swiss politician, MP (1979–1995).
- Mahsa Amini, 22, Iranian woman, subject of the Mahsa Amini protests.
- Allen Aylett, 88, Australian football player (North Melbourne) and administrator.
- Mark Bloch, 98, Russian linguist.
- Ronald Cohn, 78, American zoologist.
- Jack Cottrell, 84, American Christian theologian and philosopher.
- Zulema Dene, 88, English actress (Willow, Emergency Ward 10, Coronation Street).
- Jimmy "Preacher" Ellis, 88, American blues musician.
- Sergei Gorenko, 40, Russian politician and public prosecutor, explosion.
- Abul Hasnat, 82, Bangladeshi lawyer and politician, MP (1990), twice minister of housing, mayor of Dhaka (1977–1982, 1990).
- Marva Hicks, 66, American singer and actress (Mad About You, One Life to Live, Star Trek: Voyager).
- Bob Humphreys, 86, American athlete.
- Jorma Kuisma, 75, Canadian gridiron football player (Montreal Alouettes), illiness.
- Amedeo Matacena, 59, Italian shipowner, mobster and politician, deputy (1994–2001), heart attack.
- Norton Mezvinsky, 89, American historian.
- Mark Nykanen, 70, American novelist and journalist.
- James Aubrey Parker, 85, American lawyer, judge of the U.S. District Court for the District of New Mexico (since 1987).
- Haluk Pekşen, 61, Turkish lawyer and politician, MP (2015–2018).
- Raymundo Taco Sabio, 76, Filipino Roman Catholic priest, prefect of the Marshall Islands (2007–2017) and member of the Missionaries of the Sacred Heart (since 1969).
- Hajrudin Saračević, 73, Bosnian football player (Željezničar) and manager (Bačka 1901).
- Fritz Sperling, 76, Austrian Olympic bobsledder.
- Luciano Vassallo, 87, Ethiopian football player (Asmara Calcio, national team) and manager (Cotton Factory Club).
- Stanisław Żytkowski, 74, Polish lawyer and politician, senator (1989–1991).

=== 17 ===
- Nicolas Belfrage, 82, American-born British wine critic and writer, complications of Parkinson's disease.
- Meinhard Doelle, 68, German-born Canadian lawyer.
- Lydia Dotto, 73, Canadian science journalist and author.
- Jim Frazier, 81, Australian inventor (Frazier lens) and cinematographer.
- José García Buitrón, 77, Spanish doctor and politician, senator (2015–2016).
- Mathias Feldges, 85, Swiss politician, member of the Executive Council of Basel-Stadt (1984–1997).
- Robert Gentry, 81, American actor (Generations, All My Children, Another World).
- Vernon Heywood, 94, British botanist.
- Joseph P. Hoar, 87, American Marine Corps general.
- Manikrao Hodlya Gavit, 87, Indian politician, MP (1980–2014).
- Kelsang Gyatso, 91, Tibetan Buddhist monk and meditation teacher, founder of New Kadampa Tradition.
- Michael Homan, 56, American theologian and musician, cirrhosis.
- Isami Ishii, 80, Japanese manga artist (750 Rider), heart failure.
- Hrafn Jökulsson, 56, Icelandic writer, journalist (Tíminn, Alþýðublaðið) and politician, MP (1995–1999), cancer.
- Jeremy Kilpatrick, 86, American mathematician, complications from Parkinson's disease.
- Mal Logan, 91, Australian geographer and university administrator, vice-chancellor and president of Monash University (1987–1996).
- Igor Maslennikov, 90, Russian film director (Sentimental Romance, The Adventures of Sherlock Holmes and Dr. Watson, Winter Cherry).
- Vlado Milunić, 81, Yugoslav-born Czech architect (Dancing House).
- Phil Mulkey, 89, American Olympic decathlete (1960).
- Robert Niemi, 67, American literary scholar, literary critic and author.
- Art Noonan, 70, American politician, member of the Montana House of Representatives (2004–2009), heart attack.
- Maria Grazia Pagano, 76, Italian politician, senator (1992–2006), MEP (2008–2009).
- Olga Ramos, 60, Venezuelan activist, professor and researcher (b. 1962).
- Christian Rätsch, 65, German anthropologist.
- Maarten Schmidt, 92, Dutch-born American astronomer (Kennicutt–Schmidt law), discoverer of the quasar.
- Anna Thynn, Marchioness of Bath, 78, Hungarian-born British actress (Therese and Isabelle, The House of the Missing Girls, Zeta One).

=== 18 ===
- Azyumardi Azra, 67, Indonesian Islamic scholar, rector of Syarif Hidayatullah State Islamic University Jakarta (1998–2006).
- Leonard A. Cole, 89, American dentist and political scientist.
- Mustafa Dağıstanlı, 91, Turkish freestyle wrestler, Olympic champion (1956, 1960).
- Vincent Di Maio, 81, American pathologist, complications from COVID-19.
- Kjell Espmark, 92, Swedish writer, member of the Swedish Academy (since 1981).
- Yakov Gorelnikov, 74, Kazakh actor and politician, deputy (1994–1995).
- Diane Guérin, 74, Canadian singer and actress (Sol et Gobelet).
- Elyakim Haetzni, 96, German-born Israeli lawyer, settlement activist and politician, MK (1988–1992).
- Nick Holonyak, 93, American engineer and inventor.
- Huang Nianlai, 82, Chinese mycologist and politician, member of the National People's Congress (1983–1993).
- Martha Karagianni, 82, Greek actress (Something Is Burning, Kiss the Girls, Marijuana Stop!).
- Fritz Köppen, 87, German Olympic long jumper.
- Svetozar Saša Kovačević, 72, Serbian composer, music pedagogue and church organist.
- Nathan Larson, 41, American criminal, suicide by starvation.
- Albert Legault, 84, Canadian academic and researcher.
- Gabriella Licudi, 81, British actress (Casino Royale).
- Carmen A. Miró, 103, Panamanian sociologist, statistician, and demographer.
- Ladislav Moc, 91, Czech Olympic racewalker.
- Héctor Polino, 89, Argentine lawyer and politician, deputy (1993–2005).
- Mark Raffles, 100, British magician.
- Lady Mary Russell, 88, Scottish socialite.
- Nicolas Schindelholz, 34, Swiss footballer (Thun, Aarau, Luzern), lung cancer.
- Victor G. Springer, 94, American biologist.
- Wally Tatomir, 76, Canadian-born American ice hockey equipment manager (Carolina Hurricanes) and inventor.
- Cherry Valentine, 28, English drag queen (RuPaul's Drag Race UK, Cherry Valentine: Gypsy Queen and Proud), suicide by hanging.
- Jeff Weiss, 82, American actor (Vanilla Sky, Mr. Destiny) and playwright.
- Christopher Ziadie, 55, Jamaican footballer (Boys' Town, national team).

=== 19 ===
- Klaus Behrens, 81, German rower, Olympic silver medallist (1964).
- Robert Brown, 95, American actor (Here Come the Brides, Primus, The Flame Barrier).
- Lija Brīdaka, 90, Latvian poet.
- Vernon Dvorak, 93, American meteorologist.
- Joseph Fiorenza, 91, American Roman Catholic prelate, bishop of San Angelo (1979–1984), bishop (1985–2004) and archbishop (2004–2006) of Galveston–Houston.
- David Foreman, 74, American environmentalist, co-founder of Earth First!.
- Vladimir Golubev, 72, Russian football player (Zenit, Soviet Union national team) and manager.
- Marilyn P. Johnson, 100, American diplomat, ambassador to Togo (1978–1981).
- Harry Langford, 92, Canadian football player (Calgary Stampeders).
- Franklin Lewis, 61, American Iranologist.
- Herb Lusk, 69, American football player (Philadelphia Eagles) and pastor.
- Shabsa Mashkautsan, 98, Romanian-born soldier, Hero of the Soviet Union (1945).
- Valerie Maynard, 85, American sculptor.
- Susan Menard, American politician, mayor of Woonsocket, Rhode Island (1995–2009), chronic obstructive pulmonary disease. (body discovered on this date)
- Jaakko Numminen, 93, Finnish politician, minister of education (1970).
- Pak Yong-il, 56, North Korean politician, vice-chairman of the standing committee of the SPA (since 2019).
- Julien Rascagnères, 77, French rugby league player (XIII Catalan, Pia) and international referee.
- Alan Richwald, 84, American explosive ordnance disposal expert.
- Bishnu Sethi, 61, Indian writer and politician, Odisha MLA (2000–2004), kidney disease.
- John Stinka, 87, Canadian Orthodox prelate, metropolitan primate of the UOCC (2005–2010).
- Maury Wills, 89, American baseball player (Los Angeles Dodgers, Pittsburgh Pirates) and manager (Seattle Mariners), World Series champion (1959, 1963, 1965).
- Aleksander Wrona, 82, Polish Olympic field hockey player.

=== 20 ===
- Steve Ache, 60, American football player (Minnesota Vikings).
- James Annest, 95, American politician.
- Émile Antonio, 94, French footballer (FC Sète, OGC Nice, Olympique Lyonnais).
- Choi U-geun, 96, South Korean businessman and politician, MNA (1976–1980).
- Ian Hay Davison, 91, British businessman.
- Philippine Dhanis, 55, Belgian politician and parliamentary assistant.
- David C. Harrington, 68, American politician, member of the Maryland Senate (2008–2011) and mayor of Bladensburg (1995–2002).
- Robert Kalfin, 89, American stage director and producer.
- Tanios El Khoury, 92, Lebanese Maronite Catholic prelate, eparch of Sidon (1996–2005).
- John Marks, 97, British medical doctor, chairman of the British Medical Association (1984–1990).
- Aleksey Nagin, 41, Russian military officer.
- Robin Ord-Smith, 56, British diplomat.
- Sergei Puskepalis, 56, Russian actor (Metro, How I Ended This Summer, Simple Things) and theatre director, traffic collision.
- Virginio Rognoni, 98, Italian politician, minister of the interior (1978–1983), justice (1986–1987) and defence (1990–1992).
- Nika Shakarami, 16, Iranian protester (Mahsa Amini protests).
- Song Baorui, 84, Chinese politician, governor of Sichuan (1996–1999).
- Charles Stack, 86, American lawyer.
- Peter Yeldham, 95, Australian screenwriter (Ten Little Indians, The Call of the Wild), playwright (Seven Little Australians) and novelist.

=== 21 ===
- Mohd Adib Mohamad Adam, 81, Malaysian politician, chief minister of Malacca (1978–1982) and MP (1982–1990).
- Lydia Alfonsi, 94, Italian actress (Black Sabbath, The Strange Night, Open Doors).
- Tom Benner, 72, Canadian sculptor and painter.
- Roland Bulirsch, 89, German mathematician (Bulirsch–Stoer algorithm).
- Vernon Burch, 67, American singer and guitarist.
- Dean Caswell, 100, American World War II flying ace.
- Antonio Ceballos Atienza, 87, Spanish Roman Catholic prelate, bishop of Ciudad Rodrigo (1988–1993) and Cádiz y Ceuta (1993–2011), stroke.
- François Corteggiani, 69, French comics artist (Pif le chien, Pif Gadget).
- Andy Detwiler, 52, American farmer and internet personality.
- John Duncan, 84, American author and historian.
- Ray Edenton, 95, American guitarist and session musician.
- Bernhardt Edskes, 81, Dutch-Swiss organ builder.
- Jimmy Elder, 94, Scottish footballer (Portsmouth, Colchester United, Yeovil Town).
- Anatoly Gerashchenko, 72, Russian aviation scientist and academic, rector of the Moscow Aviation Institute (2007–2015), fall.
- Makhluf Haddadin, 86–87, Jordanian chemist.
- John Hamblin, 87, English-born Australian television presenter (Play School) and actor (The Restless Years).
- Raymond Huguet, 84, French racing cyclist.
- Charles Kadushin, 90, American psychologist.
- Earl Killian, 102, American sports coach (Towson Tigers).
- Kenneth Kister, 86, American academic.
- Clarene Law, 89, American politician.
- Greg Lee, 70, American basketball player (UCLA Bruins, Portland Trail Blazers) and beach volleyball player, infection.
- Andrea Molnár-Bodó, 88, Hungarian gymnast, Olympic champion (1956).
- Edward Mosberg, 96, Polish-American Holocaust survivor.
- Darrell Mudra, 93, American Hall of Fame college football coach (North Dakota State Bison, Arizona Wildcats, Eastern Illinois Panthers).
- Sedapatti R. Muthiah, 76, Indian politician, twice MP, member (1977–1989) and speaker (1991–1996) of the Tamil Nadu Legislative Assembly.
- Sirkka Norrlund, 79, Finnish Olympic hurdler (1964).
- Paul-Emile Saadé, 89, Lebanese Maronite Catholic prelate, auxiliary bishop of Antioch (1986–1999) and eparch of Batroun (1999–2011).
- Isidro Sala, 81, Spanish Olympic footballer (1968).
- Allan M. Siegal, 82, American newspaper editor (The New York Times).
- Raju Srivastav, 58, Indian actor (Bombay to Goa, Aamdani Atthanni Kharcha Rupaiya) and comedian (The Great Indian Laughter Challenge), complications from a heart attack.
- Kapil Narayan Tiwari, 93, Indian activist and politician, MLA (1977–1980).
- Tu Zhen, 88, Chinese translator.
- Russell Weir, 71, Scottish golfer.
- Tomasz Wołek, 74, Polish journalist and sports commentator.

=== 22 ===
- Stu Allan, 60, British dance music DJ (Clock) and record producer, stomach cancer.
- Daniel André, 57, Mauritian Olympic sprinter.
- István Aranyos, 80, Hungarian Olympic gymnast (1964, 1968).
- Carlos Balá, 97, Argentine actor (My Family's Beautiful!) and comedian, heart failure.
- William K. Barlow, 86, American politician, pancreatic cancer.
- Dave Barrow, 75, Canadian politician, mayor of Richmond Hill (2006–2021).
- Dmitriy Besov, 98, Russian football coach.
- Donald M. Blinken, 96, American diplomat, ambassador to Hungary (1994–1997).
- François Bott, 87, French novelist and journalist, founder of Le Nouveau Magazine Littéraire.
- Tony Brown, 77, English darts player.
- Stephen Chazen, 76, American energy executive, CEO of Occidental Petroleum (2011–2016), cancer.
- Marc Danval, 85, Belgian journalist and writer.
- Ioannis Dimopoulos, 90, Greek politician, MP (1974–1981), MEP (1981).
- Jorge Fons, 83, Mexican film director (Los Cachorros, Fé, Esperanza y Caridad, The Bricklayers).
- Igor Gorbunov, 81, Russian politician.
- Tim Hankinson, 67, American soccer coach (Oglethorpe University, Indy Eleven, Chattanooga Red Wolves).
- Raymond Jones, 97, Australian architect and footballer (Collingwood, Melbourne).
- Rainer Keller, 56, German politician, MP (since 2021).
- Humayun Khan, 90, Pakistani diplomat and politician, foreign secretary (1988–1989).
- Wendell Lady, 91, American politician, member (1969–1983) and speaker (1979–1983) of the Kansas House of Representatives.
- Tim Leggatt, 88, English author.
- Dame Hilary Mantel, 70, British author (Wolf Hall, Bring Up the Bodies, The Mirror & the Light), Booker Prize winner (2009, 2012), complications from a stroke.
- Robert Marlow, 60, English singer ("The Face of Dorian Gray").
- Nick Mumley, 85, American football player (New York Titans).
- Pal Singh Purewal, 90, Indian-Canadian scholar (Nanakshahi calendar).
- Katharine Lee Reid, 90, American art historian and museum director, complications following heart surgery.
- Ren Rongrong, 99, Chinese children's author and translator.
- Ronald V. Schmidt, 78, American computer network engineer, co-founder of SynOptics.
- Hesham Selim, 64, Egyptian actor, cancer.
- Mohamed Sheikh, Baron Sheikh, 81, British businessman and peer, member of the House of Lords (since 2006).
- Ladislav Švihran, 90, Belgian-born Slovak writer and translator.
- Wang Wei, 48, Chinese politician, member of the National People's Congress (since 2018).

=== 23 ===
- Prince Amartey, 78, Ghanaian boxer, Olympic bronze medallist (1972).
- James R. Biard, 91, American electrical engineer and inventor.
- Jamie Brannen, 47, Canadian curler.
- Marut Bunnag, 98, Thai politician, speaker of the House of Representatives (1992–1995).
- Keith Carroll, 92, Australian rules footballer (Melbourne).
- Patricia Cloherty, 80, American businesswoman.
- Boris Dobrodeev, 95, Russian screenwriter (The First Teacher, Particularly Important Task, Recollections of Pavlovsk).
- Zack Estrin, 51, American television writer and producer (Prison Break, Charmed, Lost in Space).
- Louise Fletcher, 88, American actress (One Flew Over the Cuckoo's Nest, Star Trek: Deep Space Nine, Brainstorm), Oscar winner (1976).
- Giuliano Fortunato, 82, Italian footballer (Triestina, Milan, Lazio).
- Bill Fulcher, 88, American football player (Washington Redskins) and coach (Georgia Tech Yellow Jackets, Tampa Spartans).
- Heather Goodman, 87, English Olympic canoer (1972).
- Stanisław Kasprzyk, 79, Polish Olympic field hockey player.
- Vladimir Krasnopolsky, 89, Russian film director (The Slowest Train, Not Under the Jurisdiction, Eternal Call), screenwriter and producer.
- Imre Koltai, 84, Hungarian chemical engineer and politician, MP (1980–1990, 1994–1998).
- Yuki Onishi, 43, Japanese chef, heart failure.
- Vladimir Petercă, 78, Romanian Roman Catholic theologian.
- Franciszek Pieczka, 94, Polish actor (Four Tank-Men and a Dog, The Deluge, Quo Vadis).
- Celso Scarpini, 77, Brazilian Olympic basketball player (1968).
- Jim Sheridan, 69, British politician, MP (2001–2015).
- Willy Soemita, 86, Surinamese politician, deputy vice president (1988–1990).
- Starman, 47, Mexican professional wrestler (CMLL).

=== 24 ===
- Pixie Annat, 92, Australian hospital matron and administrator.
- Hudson Austin, 84, Grenadian military officer, chairman of the Revolutionary Military Council (1983).
- Tim Ball, 83, British-born Canadian climatologist and public speaker.
- Bill Blaikie, 71, Canadian politician, MP (1979–2008) and Manitoba MLA (2009–2011), cancer.
- Andon Boškovski, 47, Macedonian handball coach (HC Rabotnichki, RK Eurofarm Rabotnik, Georgia national team).
- Chic Brodie, 78, Scottish politician, MSP (2011–2016), oesophageal cancer.
- Chris Davidson, 45, Australian surfer, head injury.
- Chandler Davis, 96, American-Canadian mathematician.
- Manfred Degen, 82, German politician, member of the Landtag of North Rhine-Westphalia (1990–2005).
- Marie-Louise Fort, 71, French politician, deputy (2007–2017), mayor of Sens (2001–2008, since 2014).
- Rita Gardner, 87, American actress (A Family Affair, The Wedding Singer, Little Voice), leukemia.
- Simon Ibo, 82, French actor, singer, and politician, member of the Regional Council of Guadeloupe (1998–2003).
- Sue Mingus, 92, American record producer and music manager.
- Kitten Natividad, 74, Mexican-American actress (Beneath the Valley of the Ultra-Vixens, Night Patrol, Takin' It All Off) and exotic dancer.
- Jeffrey B. Perry, 75, American independent scholar and historian.
- Pavel Pervushin, 75, Russian heavyweight weightlifter, 110kg world champion (1973).
- Stephen Pruslin, 82, American pianist and librettist.
- John Rowe, 77, American attorney and energy executive (Exelon).
- Pharoah Sanders, 81, American jazz saxophonist.
- Amin Tarokh, 69, Iranian actor (Mother, Sara, Aghazadeh), heart disease.
- Fiorenzo Toso, 60, Italian academic and linguist, brain tumor.
- Sam Webb, 85, British architect.
- Ann Wigglesworth, 83, British activist.
- Helmut Wilhelm, 76, German judge and politician, MP (1994–2002).

=== 25 ===
- Ashokan, 60, Indian film director (Varnam, Saandram, Mookilla Rajyathu).
- Jonathan Beaulieu-Richard, 33, Canadian football player (Montreal Alouettes, Ottawa Redblacks), cancer.
- Aïcha Chenna, 81, Moroccan social worker and women's rights activist, founder of Association Solidarité Féminine.
- Rafael Chimishkyan, 93, Georgian weightlifter, Olympic champion (1952).
- Gürkan Coşkun, 81, Turkish painter, cancer.
- Jacques Drèze, 93, Belgian economist.
- Elena Elagina, 73, Russian conceptual artist.
- James Florio, 85, American politician, governor of New Jersey (1990–1994) and member of the U.S. House of Representatives (1975–1990).
- Ann Garman, 89, American baseball player (South Bend Blue Sox).
- Josef Gitelson, 94, Russian biophysicist.
- Masaaki Ikenaga, 76, Japanese baseball player (Nishitetsu Lions), cancer.
- Melvin Kaplan, 93, American oboist.
- Kim Seong-Dong, 74, South Korean writer.
- Nikolai Kirtok, 101, Ukrainian-born Russian Red Army pilot, Hero of the Soviet Union (1945).
- Roy MacLaren, 92, Scottish footballer (St Johnstone, Sheffield Wednesday, Bury).
- Angus McKenzie, 86, British Olympic fencer (1960).
- Alfred Michael, 94, American physician.
- Aryadan Muhammed, 87, Indian politician, Kerala MLA (1977–2016).
- Andrés Prieto, 93, Chilean football player (Universidad Católica, national team) and manager (Colo-Colo).
- Radovan Radaković, 51, Serbian football manager and player (Tilleur-Liégeois, Partizan, FR Yugoslavia national team).
- Aníbal Ramón Ruffner, 63, Peruvian engineer and politician, mayor of San Buenaventura District, Canta (2003–2010).
- Gianfranco Spadaccia, 87, Italian politician, deputy (1983–1986, 1990) and senator (1987–1990).
- Prema Srinivasan, 90, Indian children's author.
- Robert Steckle, 92, Canadian Olympic wrestler (1952, 1956, 1960).
- Leslie Swindale, 94, New Zealand-born American soil scientist.
- Meredith Tax, 80, American writer and political activist.
- Jean-René Toumelin, 80, French sporting director, president of FC Nantes (1996–1999).
- Srbijanka Turajlić, 76, Serbian academic and political activist.
- Igor Varlamov, 51, Russian footballer (Torpedo Vladimir, Tyumen, Spartak Nalchik).
- Bobby Watkins, 90, American football player (Chicago Bears, Chicago Cardinals).
- Willard N. Young, 95, American politician.
- Sandra Zaiter, 78, Dominican-Puerto Rican actress, children's television show host (Teatrimundo) and singer.
- Oleksiy Zhuravko, 48, Ukrainian-Russian politician, people's deputy (2006–2012), airstrike.

=== 26 ===
- Tony L. Bennett, 82, American police officer and politician, member of the Minnesota House of Representatives (1971–1974, 1983–1990).
- Ihor Bezohlyuk, 50, Ukrainian military serviceman, mine detonation.
- Joe Bussard, 86, American record collector, pancreatic cancer.
- Brian Catling, 73, British sculptor, writer (The Vorrh, The Erstwhile) and filmmaker.
- Meiny Epema-Brugman, 91, Dutch politician, MP (1970–1971, 1972–1982).
- Cole Harris, 86, Canadian geographer and academic.
- Hugh Hyland, 72, Irish Gaelic footballer (Monasterevin, Kildare).
- Frederick Kriekenbeek, 90, Filipino Roman Catholic priest and exorcist.
- Lilo, 101, German-born French singer and actress (Happy New Year, And Now My Love).
- Ranesh Maitra, 88, Bangladeshi journalist.
- Hilaree Nelson, 49, American ski mountaineer, avalanche.
- Carlos Pairetti, 86, Argentine stock car racing driver, lung failure.
- Ronney Pettersson, 82, Swedish footballer (Djurgårdens IF, Hudiksvalls ABK, national team).
- Michel Pinçon, 80, French sociologist, Alzheimer's disease.
- William Rivers Pitt, 50, American author.
- Cristien Polak, 68, Surinamese politician.
- Yusuf al-Qaradawi, 96, Egyptian Islamic scholar (The Lawful and the Prohibited in Islam), chairman of IUMS (since 2004).
- Tom Reed, 77, American college football player and coach (Miami University Redskins, North Carolina State Wolfpack).
- Dave Smith, 74, English footballer (Lincoln City, Rotherham United). (death announced on this date)
- Knud Sørensen, 94, Danish novelist, essayist, and poet.
- Mark Souder, 72, American politician, member of the U.S. House of Representatives (1995–2010), pancreatic cancer.
- Venetia Stevenson, 84, English-American actress (Day of the Outlaw, Seven Ways from Sundown, The Sergeant Was a Lady), complications from Parkinson's disease.
- Paolo Tringali, 97, Italian politician, deputy (1983–1987).
- Wong Phui Nam, 87, Malaysian economist and poet.

=== 27 ===
- Madingo Afework, 44, Ethiopian tizita singer.
- Amadou Ali, 79, Cameroonian politician, minister of justice (2001–2011).
- Michio Ariyoshi, 87, Japanese shogi player, aspiration pneumonia.
- Andrew van der Bijl, 94, Dutch Christian missionary, founder of Open Doors.
- Kurt Binder, 78, Austrian theoretical physicist.
- Bruno Bolchi, 82, Italian football player (Inter, national team) and manager (Lecce).
- Vincent Deporter, 63, Belgian comic book artist and animator (SpongeBob Comics).
- Shinjirō Ehara, 85, Japanese actor (Jun'ai Monogatari, The Rice People, Naked Sun), progressive supranuclear palsy.
- Prince Ferfried of Hohenzollern, 79, German aristocrat and racing driver.
- Julio César Guerra Tulena, 89, Colombian surgeon and politician, deputy (1991–1994), member (1994–2002) and president of the Senate (1995–1996).
- Jean-Claude Hiquet, 82, French rugby union player (SU Agen, national team).
- Joan Hotchkis, 95, American actress (The Life and Times of Eddie Roberts, The Odd Couple, My World and Welcome to It), heart failure.
- Ronald W. Jones, 91, American trade economist.
- Claude Kory Kondiano, 79–80, Guinean politician, president of the National Assembly (2014–2020).
- Boris Moiseev, 68, Russian pop singer, choreographer and dancer, stroke.
- José Pacheco, 75, Spanish footballer (Atlético Madrid, Logroñés).
- Judah Samet, 84, Hungarian-American Holocaust survivor, public speaker and businessman, stomach cancer.
- Michael John Sheridan, 77, American Roman Catholic prelate, auxiliary bishop of St. Louis (1997–2001), coadjutor bishop (2001–2003) and bishop (2003–2021) of Colorado Springs.
- Dick Wallis, 91, American politician.

=== 28 ===
- Mario Algaze, 75, Cuban-American photographer.
- Michel Ameller, 96, French government official, member of the Constitutional Council (1995–2004).
- João de Aquino, 77, Brazilian guitarist and composer.
- Arlene Bashnett, 103, American internet celebrity (Gramma and Ginga).
- Torhild Bransdal, 66, Norwegian politician, MP (2017–2021) and mayor of Vennesla Municipality (1999–2017).
- Coolio, 59, American rapper ("Gangsta's Paradise", "Fantastic Voyage", "C U When U Get There") and actor, Grammy winner (1996), drug overdose.
- Stephanie Dabney, 64, American prima ballerina, cardiopulmonary arrest.
- Hilton Deakin, 89, Australian Roman Catholic prelate, auxiliary bishop of Melbourne (1993–2007).
- Sabit Dudu, 91–92, Sudanese footballer (Al Hilal, national team).
- Gavin Escobar, 31, American football player (Dallas Cowboys), rock climbing accident.
- David Gottesman, 96, American businessman, founder of First Manhattan Co.
- David Warner Hagen, 90, American jurist, judge of the U.S. District Court of Nevada (1993–2005).
- Amar Singh Mangat, 87, Kenyan Olympic field hockey player (1964).
- Jim Nisbet, 75, American author and poet.
- Franklin Odo, 83, American author and scholar, cancer.
- Julio Osorio, 82, Panamanian Olympic basketball player (1968).
- Arnold Parsons, 95, English Olympic wrestler.
- Jayanti Patnaik, 90, Indian social worker and politician, MP (1980–1989, 1998–1999) and chairperson of the NCW (1992–1995).
- Andre Payette, 46, Canadian ice hockey player (Philadelphia Phantoms, Newcastle Vipers, Sheffield Steeldogs).
- Bill Plante, 84, American journalist (CBS News).
- Oonah Shannahan, 101, New Zealand netball player (national team).
- Lucas Andrew Staehelin, 83, Swiss-American cell biologist.
- Jan Styrna, 81, Polish Roman Catholic prelate, auxiliary bishop of Tarnów (1991–2003) and bishop of Elbląg (2003–2014).
- Masayoshi Takemura, 88, Japanese politician, MP (1986–2000), minister of finance (1994–1996) and chief cabinet secretary (1993–1994).
- Murray Turoff, 86, American computer scientist.
- Tom Urbani, 54, American baseball player (St. Louis Cardinals, Detroit Tigers).

=== 29 ===
- Alexandru Arșinel, 83, Romanian actor (Colierul de turcoaze, Everybody in Our Family).
- Egil Bjerklund, 89, Norwegian Olympic ice hockey player (1952, 1964).
- Gilles Boisvert, 89, Canadian ice hockey player (Detroit Red Wings).
- Kathleen Booth, 100, English computer scientist and mathematician.
- C. B. Embry, 81, American politician, member of the Kentucky House of Representatives (2003–2015) and Senate (2015–2022), cancer.
- Audrey Evans, 97, British-born American oncologist and philanthropist, co-founder of Ronald McDonald House Charities.
- Andrée Ferretti, 87, Canadian Quebec independence activist and author.
- Mieczysław Gil, 78, Polish politician, MP (1989–1993) and senator (2011–2015).
- Sohan Hayreh, 94–95, Indian-born American ophthalmologist.
- Hour Jiunn-yih, 55, Taiwanese Olympic wrestler.
- Akissi Kouamé, 67, Ivorian army officer.
- Rob Landsbergen, 62, Dutch footballer (PSV Eindhoven, Hyundai Horangi), complications from Alzheimer's disease.
- Gilles Loiselle, 93, Canadian politician, MP (1988–1993) and minister of finance (1993).
- Héctor López, 93, Panamanian baseball player (New York Yankees, Kansas City Athletics), World Series champion (1961, 1962).
- David Malachowski, 67, American guitarist, producer and composer.
- Yousuf Mustikhan, 74, Pakistani politician, liver cancer.
- Eduardo Navarro, 43, Spanish footballer (Lleida, Huesca, Numancia).
- Marybeth Peters, 83, American attorney, register of copyrights (1994–2010).
- Al Primo, 87, American television news executive.
- Prins Póló, 45, Icelandic singer-songwriter, cancer.
- Ignacio Rodríguez Iturbe, 80, Venezuelan hydrologist.
- Ildikó Szendrődi-Kővári, 92, Hungarian Olympic alpine skier (1952, 1964).
- Paul Veyne, 92, French archaeologist and historian.
- Sylvia Wu, 106, Chinese-born American restaurateur.

=== 30 ===
- Richard Akuoko Adiyiah, 67, Ghanaian politician, MP (2008–2012).
- Shehzad Azam, 36, Pakistani cricketer (Islamabad).
- Manvel Badeyan, 65, Armenian politician, MP (1999–2003).
- Max Baer, 74, American jurist, chief justice of the Supreme Court of Pennsylvania (since 2021).
- Bill Basford, 92, American politician, member of the Florida House of Representatives (1963–1966).
- Jean-Louis Bauer, 70, French actor and playwright.
- Charles Bowsher, 91, American politician, comptroller general (1981–1996).
- Marit Christensen, 73, Norwegian journalist (NRK).
- Bartolomé Clavero, 75, Spanish jurist, legal historian and academic.
- John Curdo, 91, American chess player.
- Franco Dragone, 69, Italian-born Belgian theatre director, founder of Dragone, heart attack.
- San'yūtei Enraku VI, 72, Japanese rakugo comedian (Shōten), lung cancer.
- Hildred Geertz, 95, American anthropologist.
- Zahos Hadjifotiou, 99, Greek businessman, journalist and author.
- Outi Heiskanen, 85, Finnish artist, complications from dementia.
- József Horváth, 75, Hungarian Olympic handball player (1972).
- Harley Hughes, 87, American lieutenant general.
- Keith "Wonderboy" Johnson, 50, American gospel singer.
- Yvon Lafrance, 78, Canadian politician, Quebec MNA (1989–1994).
- Kevin Locke, 68, American flautist and hoop dancer.
- Robin Marlar, 91, English cricketer (Cambridge University, Sussex) and journalist.
- Peter G. Marston, 87, American scientist and actor (The Voyage of the Mimi).
- Brian Mullins, 68, Irish Gaelic football player (St Vincents, Dublin) and manager (Derry).
- John Pearce, 82, English footballer (Grimsby Town).
- Marvin Powell, 67, American Hall of Fame football player (USC Trojans, New York Jets, Tampa Bay Buccaneers).
- Rick Redman, 79, American Hall of Fame football player (Washington Huskies, San Diego Chargers, Portland Storm).
- Billy Sothern, 45, American lawyer.
- Daniel Soulez Larivière, 80, French lawyer.
- Marv Staehle, 80, American baseball player (Chicago White Sox, Montreal Expos, Atlanta Braves).
- Colin Touchin, 69, British composer, pancreatic cancer.
- Alexandru Vagner, 33, Romanian footballer (Gloria Bistriţa, Târgu Mureș, Brașov), heart attack.
- Roger Welsch, 85, American television correspondent (CBS News Sunday Morning) and author.
- Dan Wieden, 77, American advertising executive, co-founder of Wieden+Kennedy, coined the slogan Just Do It.
- Yury Zaitsev, 71, Russian weightlifter, Olympic champion (1976).
- Khaled Al-Zylaeei, 35, Saudi footballer (Abha, Al-Nassr, national team).
