= Choi U-geun =

South Korean businessman and politician (1926–2022)

Member of the National Assembly of South Korea
- In office 1976–1980

Personal details
- Born: 18 September 1926 Gangneung, Korea, Empire of Japan
- Died: 20 September 2022 (aged 96)
- Party: Yoo Shin
- Education: Korea Military Academy; Republic of Korea Army Infantry School; Republic of Korea Army College
- Occupation: Businessman

Choi U-geun (Korean: 최우근; 18 September 1926 – 20 September 2022) was a South Korean businessman and military politician. A member of Yoo Shin, he served in the National Assembly from 1976 to 1980.

Choi died on 20 September 2022, at the age of 96.
