= Tatyana Koryagina =

Russian economist and politician (1943–2022)

Member of the Congress of People's Deputies of Russia
- In office 16 May 1990 – 21 September 1993
- Preceded by: position established
- Succeeded by: position abolished
- Constituency: Zelenograd district no. 15

Personal details
- Born: Tatyana Ivanovna Koryagina; 10 July 1943
- Died: 6 September 2022 (aged 79)
- Party: Democratic Russia
- Education: Russian State University of Tourism and Services Studies
- Occupation: Economist

Tatyana Ivanovna Koryagina (Russian: Татьяна Ивановна Корягина; 10 July 1943 – 6 September 2022) was a Russian economist and politician. A member of Democratic Russia, she served in the Congress of People's Deputies of Russia from 1990 to 1993.

Koryagina died on 6 September 2022, at the age of 80.
