= Dmitriy Besov =

Russian football coach (1924–2022)

Dmitriy Nikolaevich Besov (16 April 1924 – 22 September 2022) was a Russian football coach. He was founder and first director of the Saint Petersburg football school "DYuSSh Smena-Zenit".

He grew up in Leningrad (today Saint Petersburg). He started playing football at the age of 11 in the garden of the Military Medical Academy. He spent seven months in the city of the Leningrad blockade, in 1942 he was evacuated to the Orenburg Oblast with his mother, who was in charge of the department in the children's hospital. In the summer of 1942 he was drafted into the Pacific Fleet and played 1,5 months in the championship of Vladivostok. He was later drafted into the Caspian Fleet and towards the end was at the fall of Berlin.

Besov was awarded the medals "For Battle Merit", "For Courage", "For the Capture of Berlin", "For the Victory over Germany" and Order of the Patriotic War.

After the end of the war, he remained in military service for some time. In 1956 he returned to Leningrad, worked as a head coach of the central children's sports school of the city department of education. In 1967, he initiated the creation and was the first director of the "DYuSSh Smena-Zenit", where he worked for 52 years (director until 2005).

Besov died on 22 September 2022, at the age of 98.
