= Luke Swann =

English cricket coach (1983–2022)

Personal information
- Full name: Luke Kirke Swann
- Born: 25 June 1983; Hitchin, Hertfordshire, England
- Died: 8 September 2022 (aged 39)
- Role: Coach

Domestic team information
- Years: Team
- 2017–2022: Northamptonshire

Luke Kirke Swann (25 June 1983 – 6 September 2022) was an English professional cricket coach who worked for Northamptonshire County Cricket Club.

Swann was known for being one of the few coaches working in professional cricket to have not played a single first-class game. He joined the coaching staff at Northamptonshire CCC as a performance cricket coach.

== Life and career ==
Swann grew up in Hexton, Hertfordshire. He was educated at Hitchin Boys' School and played cricket for his local club side Hexton CC.

Swann joined the professional coaching staff at Northamptonshire CCC in February 2017, having previously worked as cricket programme lead coach at Wrekin College in Shropshire. During this time he also worked as a county age group coach.

On 8 September 2022, it was reported by Northamptonshire County Cricket Club, that Swann had died suddenly aged 39. Northamptonshire’s players will wear black arm bands during the upcoming fixture against Surrey.
