= Jim Shackleton =

Scotland international rugby union player

- Born: James Alexander Pirie Shackleton; 3 April 1940 Assam, India
- Died: 14 September 2022 (aged 82)
- School: Fettes College

Rugby union career
- Position: Centre
Amateur team(s)
Years	Team	Apps	(Points)
- London Scottish
Provincial / State sides
Years	Team	Apps	(Points)
1963	Blues Trial		
1963	Scotland Possibles		
International career
Years	Team	Apps	(Points)
- Scotland U16
1959-65	Scotland	7	(3)

Jim Shackleton (4 April 1940 - 14 September 2022) was a Scotland international rugby union player. He normally played at Centre.

== Rugby Union career ==
=== Amateur career ===
Born in India, after the Second World War he arrived in Scotland with his returning parents, and Shackleton went to Fettes College.

Shackleton then played for London Scottish.

He was part of the London Scottish side that won the Middlesex Sevens five times in the 1960s.

=== Provincial career ===
He played for Blues Trial on 9 February 1963.

He played for Scotland Possibles on 28 December 1963.

=== International career ===
Shackleton played for Scotland Schools.

He went on to receive 7 senior caps for Scotland. He scored a try in his last match, the 1965 game against South Africa, in a 8- 5 win for Scotland.

== Business career ==
He was a consultant in the building trade with the construction company Higgs and Hill.
