= Manvel Badeyan =

Armenian politician (1957–2022)

Member of the National Assembly of Armenia
- In office 1999–2003

Ambassador Extraordinary and Plenipotentiary of Armenia to Kuwait
- In office 2016–2018
- Preceded by: Sargis Ghazaryan
- Succeeded by: Sarmen Baghdasaryan

Personal details
- Born: 29 June 1957 Gavar, Armenian SSR, USSR
- Died: 30 September 2022 (aged 65) Yerevan, Armenia
- Party: Republican Party of Armenia
- Education: Armenian State University of Economics

Manvel Badeyan (29 June 1957 – 30 September 2022) was an Armenian politician. He attended the Armenian State University of Economics. Badeyan served as a Republican Party of Armenia member of the National Assembly of Armenia from 1999 to 2003. He served as the Armenian ambassador to Kuwait from 2016 to 2018.
