= Terence Strange =

English cricketer

Terence Victor Strange (28 December 1932 – 8 September 2022) was an English cricketer. He was a right-handed batsman and right-arm fast bowler who played for Oxfordshire. He was born in Oxford.

A right-arm fast bowler and tail-end right-handed batsman, Strange made his Minor Counties Championship debut for Oxfordshire during the 1953 season, and played 41 matches over 18 seasons. He made a single List A appearance, in 1970, his final season with the team. From the tail-end, he scored 2 not out with the bat, and took figures of 0-21 from 9 overs with the ball.

Strange died on 8 September, at the age of 89.
