= Werner Loewe =

German politician (1941–2022)

Member of the Hamburg Parliament
- In office 1978–1986

Personal details
- Born: 18 May 1941 Stettin, Pomerania, Prussia, Germany
- Died: 2022 (aged 81) Hamburg, Germany
- Party: SPD
- Occupation: Researcher

Werner Loewe (18 May 1941 – 2022) was a German politician. A member of the Social Democratic Party of Germany, he served in the Hamburg Parliament from 1978 to 1986.

Loewe died in Hamburg in 2022, at the age of 81.
