= Lija Brīdaka =

Latvian poet (1932–2022)

Lija Brīdaka (3 September 1932 – 19 September 2022) was a Latvian poet.
