= Guy-Pierre Baumann =

French chef and restaurateur (1940–2022)

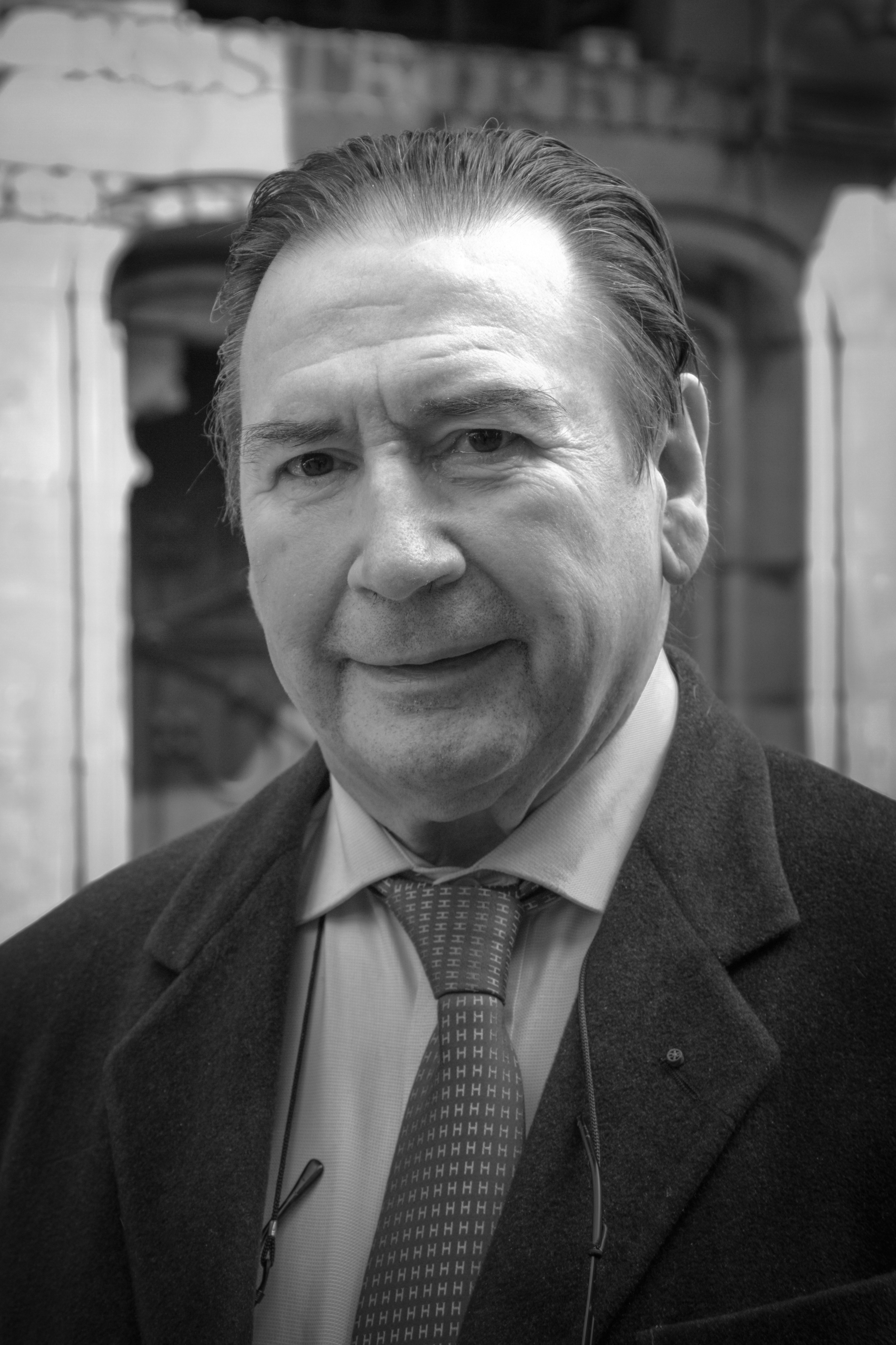
- Baumann in 2013
- Born: 25 March 1940; Ferdrupt, France
- Died: 1 September 2022 (aged 82); Strasbourg
- Occupations: Chef; Restaurateur

Guy-Pierre Baumann (25 March 1940 – 1 September 2022) was a French chef and restaurateur.

Baumann was known for the invention of the three fish sauerkraut in 1970 and having owned the prestigious Kammerzell House from 1987 to 2009.

Baumann died on 1 September 2022, at the age of 82.
