= Takanori Hayashi =

Japanese reporter and politician (1938–2022)

- 林 孝矩

Member of the House of Representatives
- In office 29 December 1969 – 19 May 1980
- Preceded by: Yoshimi Mori
- Succeeded by: Toshimi Kawamoto
- Constituency: Nara at-large

Personal details
- Born: 8 March 1938 Osaka Prefecture, Japan
- Died: 3 September 2022 (aged 84) Ikoma, Nara, Japan
- Party: Kōmeitō
- Education: Kansai University
- Occupation: Reporter

Takanori Hayashi (Japanese: 林 孝矩 Hayashi Takanori; 8 March 1938 – 3 September 2022) was a Japanese politician. A member of Kōmeitō, he served in the House of Representatives from 1969 to 1980.

Hayashi died of heart failure in Ikoma, on 3 September 2022, at the age of 84.
