= James Annest =

American politician (1927–2022)

Member of the Idaho House of Representatives
- In office 1953–1956

Personal details
- Born: May 6, 1927 Declo, Idaho, U.S.
- Died: September 20, 2022 (aged 95) Heyburn, Idaho, U.S.

James Annest (May 6, 1927 – September 20, 2022) was an American politician. He served as a member of the Idaho House of Representatives.

== Life and career ==
Annest was born in Declo, Idaho.

Annest served in the Idaho House of Representatives from 1953 to 1956.

Annest died on September 20, 2022 at his home in Heyburn, Idaho, at the age of 95.
