= Hermann Schaufler =

German jurist and politician (1947–2022)

Member of the Landtag of Baden-Württemberg
- In office 1980–2001

Personal details
- Born: 7 July 1947 Tübingen, Württemberg-Hohenzollern, Allied-occupied Germany
- Died: 1 September 2022 (aged 75)
- Party: CDU
- Education: University of Tübingen
- Occupation: Jurist

Hermann Schaufler (7 July 1947 – 1 September 2022) was a German jurist and politician. A member of the Christian Democratic Union of Germany, he served in the Landtag of Baden-Württemberg from 1980 to 2001. In the state, he was minister of the economy (Wirtschaftsminister) from 1989 to 1992, and then minister of transport (Verkehrsminister) until 1998, who was from 1996 also responsible for the environment (Umweltminister).

Schaufler died on 1 September 2022, at the age of 75.
