= Daniel Soulez Larivière =

French lawyer (1942–2022)

- Born: 19 March 1942; Angers, German-occupied France
- Died: 30 September 2022 (aged 80); Paris, France
- Education: Collège Stanislas de Paris; Faculty of Law of Paris; Sciences Po
- Occupation: Lawyer

Daniel Soulez Larivière (19 March 1942 – 30 September 2022) was a French lawyer. He became a member of the Paris Bar Association in 1965 and became fully licensed in 1968. He was notably a part of the Vedel Commission in 1992 and the April Commission in 2002. He was a partner at Soulez Larivière & Associés.

== Biography ==
=== Youth and education ===
In 1958, Larivière earned a high school diploma in the United States. In 1965, he earned a degree at the Faculty of Law of Paris and graduated from Sciences Po. He took his oath to become a lawyer on 24 November 1965.

=== Ministry ===
In 1966, Lariviére joined the cabinet of Edgard Pisani, Minister of Equipment, Housing and Transport. In 1968, he decided to devote himself to the Bar full-time following Pisani's temporary departure from politics.

=== Lawyer ===
Larivière was elected second secretary of the Conférence des avocats du barreau de Paris in November 1969 and gave a speech on the execution of Colonel Louis Roussel of the Paris Commune. He took part in numerous espionage trials in which he sought help from writer Gilles Perrault in aiding Red Orchestra leader Leopold Trepper in his escape from Poland, who was being held against his will by Mieczysław Moczar.

Larivière was the lawyer for Victor Rochenoir in the Affaire de la Garantie foncière and subsequently entered the field of business criminal law, focusing on construction problems. In 1985, he was commissioned by the Government of France to defend French citizens in the case of the Opération Satanique. In the 1980s, he was very active in aviation law, serving as the attorney for Directorate General for Civil Aviation to defend its officials pertaining to airline crashes.

Larivière was elected to the Council of the Order in 1988 and wrote an appeal to the Bâtonnier to reform the legal and judicial professions and merge the titles of lawyer and legal adviser. This appeal served as the basis to a law passed in 1990 which merged the two professions. In 1992, he became a member of the Vedel Commission on the reform of the Constitution of France and the April Commission in 2002 to create a new penal code for the President of France.

Larivière was called upon to assist in handling the affairs of major disasters, such as the Stade Armand-Cesari disaster, Air Inter Flight 5148, Air France Flight 4590, the Erika, and the Toulouse chemical factory explosion. Since 2010, he became involved with French collaboration with the U.S. Securities and Exchange Commission and the United States Department of Justice.

He was a member of the Club des juristes, a think tank led by Bernard Cazeneuve.

=== Death ===
Daniel Soulez Larivière died in Paris on 30 September 2022 at the age of 80.

== Distinctions ==
- Knight of the Legion of Honour (2003)
  - Officer (2016)
- Prix Biguet (2007)

== Publications ==
- L'Avocature (1982)
- Les Juges dans la balance (1987)
- Justice pour la justice (1990)
- Du cirque médiatico-judiciaire et des moyens d'en sortir (1993)
- Grand soir pour la justice (1997)
- Dans l'engrenage de la justice : Cela n'arrive pas qu'aux autres (1998)
- Lettres à un jeune avocat (1999)
- La justice à l'épreuve (2002)
- Le temps des victimes (2006)
- La transparence et la vertu (2014)
- Face aux juges : Ce que tous les honnêtes gens doivent savoir (2017)
- L'Avocature (new edition, 2019)
- Paroles d'avocats: Anthologie d'éloquence judiciaire (2020)
