= Damian Mymryk =

Ukrainian monk and painter

- Born: Dmytro Hryhorovych Mymryk; 17 October 1947; Velykyi Hovyliv, Ternopil Oblast, Ukrainian SSR
- Died: 11 September 2022 (aged 74); Lviv, Ukraine
- Burial place: monastic cemetery, Univ Lavra, Lviv Oblast, Ukraine
- Known for: Stone carvering, stonemasonry and vytynanky

Damian Mymryk (Ukrainian: Дам'ян Мимрик, secular name in Ukrainian: Дмитро Григорович Мимрик; 17 October 1947 – 11 September 2022) was a Ukrainian Studite monk, known as stonemason, stone carver and artist of vytynanky. He was a member of the National Union of Masters of Folk Art of Ukraine since 2005.

== Biography ==
Damian Mymryk was born on 17 October 1947 in Velykyi Hovyliv, Ternopil Oblast in the peasant family. He studied artistic stone processing at the vocational technical school #58 in Perm, Russia in 1970–1973 (teacher S. Kryvoshchokov), wood carving from his father Hryhoriy Mymryk, who was a folk craftsman. He worked as a carver at the district household plant in Monastyryska (Ternopil Oblast, 1968–1969) and at the forestry enterprise in Berezhany from 1973 until 1990. Since 1982 he also was engaged in the art of vytynanky.

In 1990 he joined the Ukrainian Studite Monks community and accepted the monastic name Damian. He was a master of wood and stone carving of the Lviv Studite Monastery (1991–1994) and at the Univ Lavra (1994–2022). Participant of regional and all-Ukrainian art exhibitions since 1972. Monk Damian held the personal exhibitions in Lviv (1992, 1995, 2003), Rivne (2000), Kyiv (2001). Mymryk's work is dominated by plots based on literary works, folklore and religious themes with the use of three-dimensional carvings. In the same time, during 1990–1994 he graduated from the Major Theological Seminary of the Redemptorists in Lviv.

Participant of many national and international exhibitions. The works are in the museums of Ternopil, Rivne, Lviv, Kyiv, Kaniv and St. Petersburg.

Monk Damian died on the morning of 11 September 2022 after a long illness, buried at the monastic cemetery of the Univ Lavra in Lviv Oblast, Ukraine.
