= Jakez Cornou =

French historian and ethnologist (1935–2022)

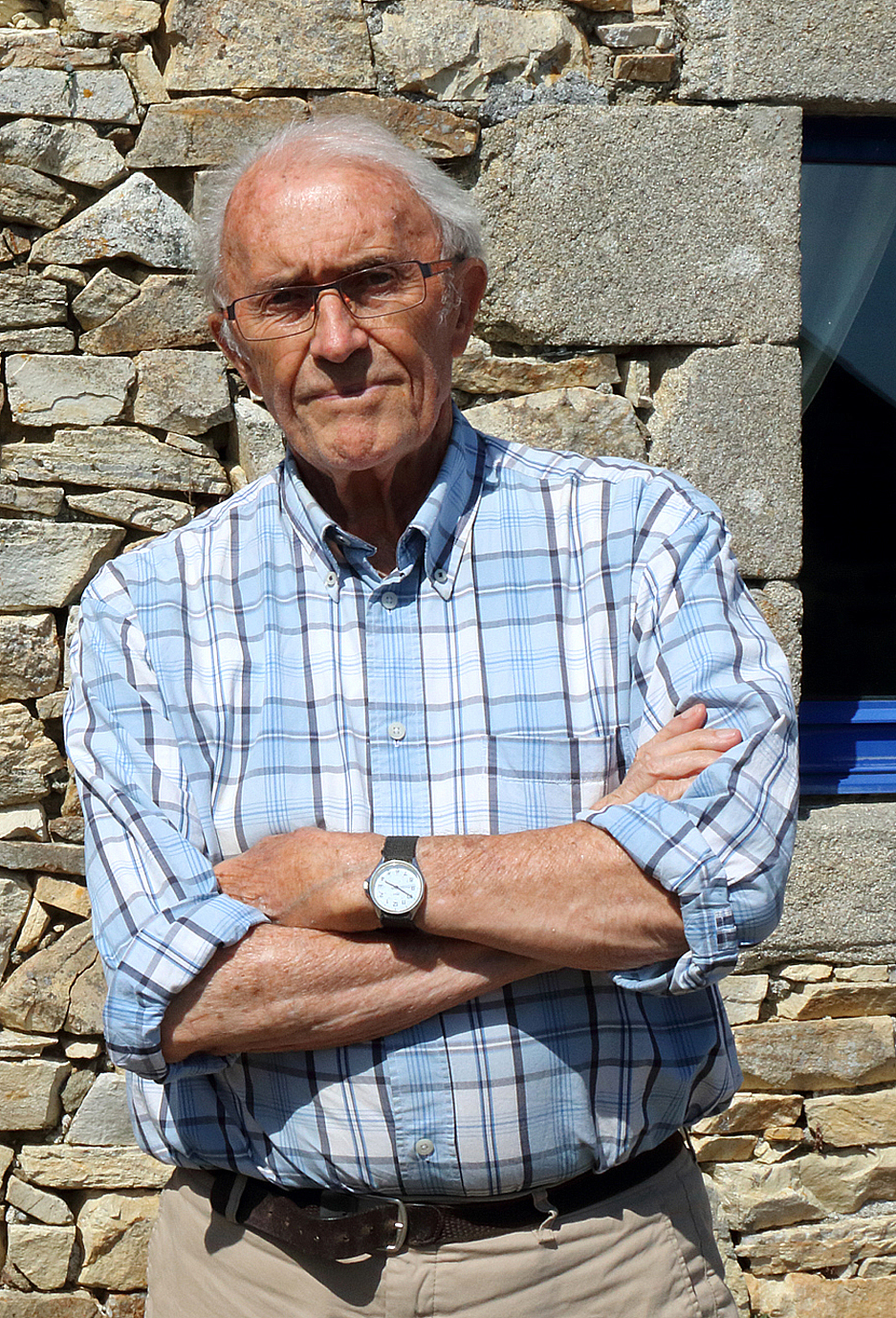
- Cornou in 2018
- Born: 1935; Brest, France
- Died: 1 September 2022 (aged 87)
- Occupations: Historian; Ethnologist; Author

Jakez Cornou (1935 – 1 September 2022) was a French historian, ethnologist, and author. He lived in Bigouden and pursued passions in history, ethnography, and heritage of the Bretons. He was a co-founder of the newspapers Cap Caval and Pays de Quimper en Cornouaille. He also directed the publishing house Éditions Sked and was a member of the collective Les Plumes du paon, which sought to promote literature in the Pays Bigouden.

== Bibliography ==
- Origine et histoire des Bigoudens (1977)
- Ar vro Vigoudenn Gwechall, le Pays Bigouden autrefois (1978)
- Les loups en Bretagne (1982)
- L'Odyssée du vaisseau 'Droits de l'Homme', l'expédition d'Irlande de 1796 (1988)
- La Coiffe Bigoudène, histoire d'une étrange parure (1993)
- Combat et naufrage du vaisseau 'Droits de l'Homme' 1797 (1997)
- L'Héroïque combat de la 'Cordelière' 1512 (1998)
- Naufrage et pillage du "Saint Jacques" à la pointe de la Torche en 1716 (1999)
