= Ernst Pfister =

German politician (1947–2022)

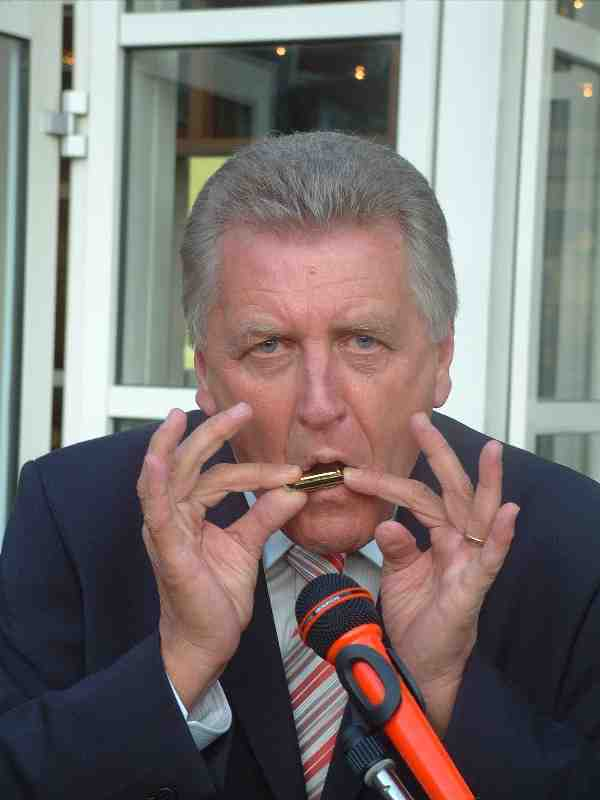
- Pfister playing a harmonica in 2004

Minister of Economics, Labour and Housing of Baden-Württemberg
- In office 14 July 2004 – 12 May 2011
- Preceded by: Walter Döring
- Succeeded by: Nils Schmid

Deputy Minister-President of Baden-Württemberg
- In office 14 July 2004 – 14 June 2006
- Preceded by: Walter Döring
- Succeeded by: Ulrich Goll

Member of the Landtag of Baden-Württemberg
- In office 1980–2011

Personal details
- Born: 28 April 1947 Trossingen, Württemberg-Hohenzollern, Germany
- Died: 4 September 2022 (aged 75) Trossingen, Baden-Württemberg, Germany
- Party: FDP
- Education: University of Tübingen; University of Freiburg

Ernst Pfister (28 April 1947 – 4 September 2022) was a German politician. A member of the Free Democratic Party, he served as Minister of Economics, Labour and Housing of Baden-Württemberg from 2004 to 2011.

== Biography ==
After earning his Abitur in Villingen-Schwenningen in 1966, Pfister carried out his military service in the Bundeswehr for one year. In 1968, he began his studies in political science, history, and sport at the University of Tübingen and the University of Freiburg. He then became a professor and later served as honorary president of the Deutscher Harmonika-Verband.

Pfister joined the Free Democratic Party (FDP) in 1969. In 1980, he was elected to the municipal council of Trossingen as well as the Landtag of Baden-Württemberg. From 1996 to 2004, he chaired the FDP group in the Landtag. On 14 July 2004, he was named Minister of Economics, Labor and Housing of Baden-Württemberg, succeeding Walter Döring, as well as Deputy Minister-President. On 14 June 2006, he handed the reins of Deputy Minister-President to Ulrich Goll. He retired from politics in 2011.

Pfister died in Trossingen on 4 September 2022, at the age of 75.
