= Susan Menard =

American politician (died 2022)

31st Mayor of Woonsocket
- In office 1995–2009
- Preceded by: Francis L. Lanctot
- Succeeded by: Leo T. Fontaine

Personal details
- Born: c. 1948; Woonsocket, Rhode Island, U.S.
- Died: c. September 2022 (aged 74); Woonsocket, Rhode Island, U.S.
- Political party: Democratic
- Domestic partner: Daniel Grabowski
- Children: 2
- Website: Government website

Susan Menard (died c. September 2022) was an American politician who served as the 31st mayor of Woonsocket, Rhode Island, from 1995 to 2009. She was the first female mayor and longest serving mayor in Woonsocket history.

== Career ==
Menard first was elected to the Woonsocket School Committee in 1981. She was later elected to the Woonsocket City Council and became its first female president. She was urged into politics by Douglas Brown, a former member of the School Committee. Menard was elected as mayor of Woonsocket in 1995, beating opponent Vincent Ward. She served until 2009, making her the longest serving mayor in the city's history. She is one of only four female mayors ever elected in Rhode Island.

== Personal life and death ==
On April 14, 2009, the same year she left office, Menard's daughter Carrie Pilavin died aged 31. On September 17, 2022, Menard's older brother Robert Miller died, aged 81. She was listed as alive in his obituary.

Menard had a long-term relationship with Daniel Grabowski. On September 20, 2022, both of their bodies were found in Menard's home. Menard is survived by her sister Marilyn and grandchildren Jacob, Nathan, Madison and Colin. Autopsy reports revealed that Menard had died of chronic obstructive pulmonary disease and Grabowski of type-2 diabetes.
