= Harry Kroger =

American physicist and electrical engineer (1936–2022)

- Education: Cornell University, and University of Rochester
- Scientific career
- Fields: Physics, electrical engineering
- Workplaces: Binghamton University

Harry Kroger (August 13, 1936 – September 9, 2022) was an American physicist and electrical engineer. He used to be a Bartle professor of electrical engineering at Binghamton University, a part of the State University of New York (SUNY) system. He had been a member of the Institute of Electrical and Electronics Engineers (IEEE) since 1964 and became a Life Fellow of the IEEE in 2001. He initially retired to Florida, then moved back to Austin, Texas.

== Family ==
In 1958, Kroger was married to Mrs. Sandra Vought Kroger. Sandy died in 2018, and Harry died in September 2022. They have three children; Charles Kroger (born 1960), John Kroger (born 1962), and Carolyn Kroger Estes (born 1964). He has ten grandchildren and two great grandchildren.

== Education and career ==
Kroger received his B.S. degree from the University of Rochester in 1957, and the Ph.D. degree from Cornell University in 1962. Both of his degrees are in physics. The title of his doctoral dissertation was "Photon absorption by valence electrons in magnesium, chromium, iron and cobalt".

Kroger began his industrial research career at Sperry Research Center, Sudbury, Massachusetts, where he served as a research staff member and in several management positions in semiconductor and superconductor electronics. He then joined the Microelectronics and Computer Technology Corporation (MCC), Austin, Texas, first as technical director of the Packaging/Interconnect Program, and later as program director for the Superconducting Electronics Program.

He joined the faculty of Binghamton University in 1992 as professor of electrical engineering and was director of the Integrated Electronics Engineering Center at Binghamton University from 1992 to 1998. He retired from Binghamton University in 2002; however, he continued to teach on a part-time basis with the title of Bartle Professor.

Kroger retired to Venice, Florida, with his wife. They then moved back to Austin, Texas, to be closer to family prior to both Sandy and Harry dying.

== Patents ==
- 5,981,869 Reduction of switching noise in high-speed circuit boards
- 5,434,530 Superconducting semiconducting cross-bar circuit
- 5,388,068 Superconductor-semiconductor hybrid memory circuits with superconducting three-terminal switching devices
- 5,024,993 Superconducting-semiconducting circuits, devices and systems
- 4,899,439 Method of fabricating a high density electrical interconnect
- 4,681,666 Planarization of a layer of metal and anodic aluminum
- 4,544,937 Formation of normal resistors by degenerate doping of substrates
- 4,536,781 Fabrication of superconductive tunneling junction resistors and short circuits by ion implantation
- 4,536,414 Superconductive tunnel junction device with enhanced characteristics and method of manufacture
- 4,490,733 Josephson device with tunneling barrier having low density of localized states and enhanced figures of merit
- 4,437,761 Refractive index temperature sensor
- 4,421,785 Superconductive tunnel junction device and method of manufacture
- 4,224,630 Multiple weak-link SQUID
- 4,220,959 Josephson tunnel junction with polycrystalline silicon, germanium or silicon-germanium alloy tunneling barrier
- 4,177,476 Multiple weak-link SQUID with non-superconductive material weak-links
- 4,176,365 Josephson tunnel junction device with hydrogenated amorphous silicon, germanium or silicon-germanium alloy tunneling barrier
- 4,142,112 Single active element controlled-inversion semiconductor storage cell devices and storage matrices employing same
- 3,979,613 Multi-terminal controlled-inversion semiconductor devices

== Publications ==
Kroger published more than 60 papers in refereed journals and conference proceedings. One of his papers is available online for free: Harry, Kroger; Jiayuan Fang; Yuzhe Chen (May 1999). "Using An Electromagnetic Simulation Tool For Demonstrations In A Course On Electronics Packaging" (PDF). ASME InterPack’99. Maui, Hawaii: ASME. pp. 2145–2150.
