= Edo Spier =

Dutch architect and politician (1926–2022)

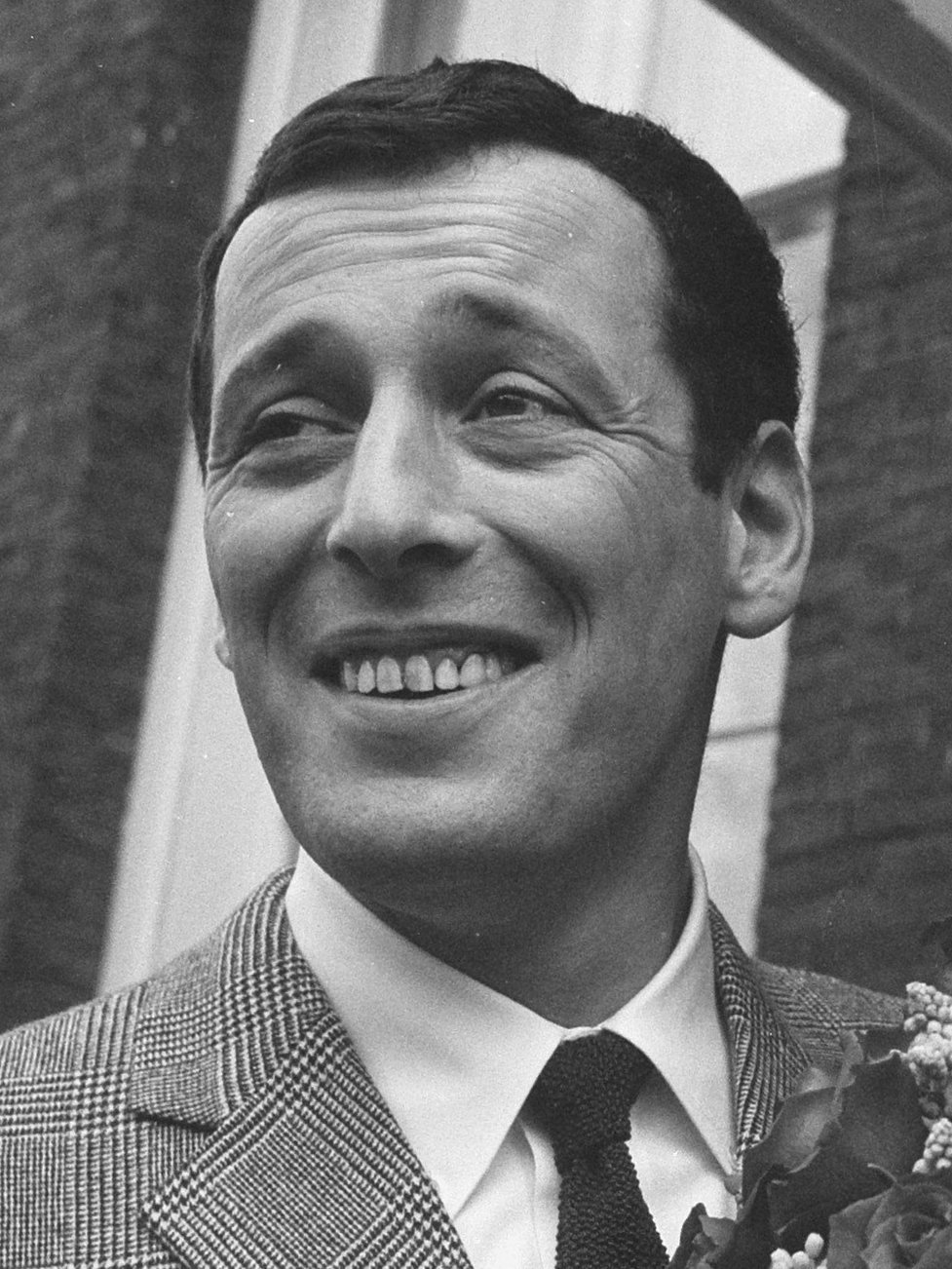
- Spier in 1962

Member of the Senate of the Netherlands
- In office June 1991 – June 1995

Personal details
- Born: Elias Spier; 26 May 1926 Amsterdam, Netherlands
- Died: 6 September 2022 (aged 96)
- Party: D66
- Education: Institute for Arts and Crafts Education
- Occupation: Architect

Elias "Edo" Spier (26 May 1926 – 6 September 2022) was a Dutch architect and politician. A member of the Democrats 66 party, he served in the Senate from 1991 to 1995.

Spier died on 6 September 2022, at the age of 96.
