= Mykhailo Rodionov =

Ukrainian academic and politician (1937–2022)

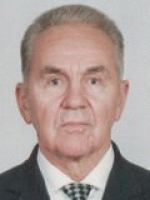
- Rodionov in 2002

People's Deputy of Ukraine
- In office 14 May 2002 – 25 May 2006

Personal details
- Born: Mykhailo Kuzmych Rodionov; 10 July 1937 Maltsevo, Oktyabrsky District, Kursk Oblast, Russian SFSR, USSR
- Died: 15 September 2022 (aged 85) Kyiv, Ukraine
- Party: CPSU (until 1991); KPU
- Education: Igor Sikorsky Kyiv Polytechnic Institute
- Occupation: Professor

Mykhailo Kuzmych Rodionov (Ukrainian: Михайло Кузьмич Родіонов; 10 July 1937 – 15 September 2022) was a Ukrainian politician. A member of the Communist Party of Ukraine, he served in the Verkhovna Rada from 2002 to 2006.

Rodionov died in Kyiv on 15 September 2022, at the age of 85.
