= Louis-Michel Nourry =

French historian (1946–2022)

- Born: 5 April 1946; Fougères, France
- Died: 14 September 2022 (aged 76)
- Education: Paris 1 Panthéon-Sorbonne University
- Occupation: Historian

Louis-Michel Nourry (5 April 1946 – 14 September 2022) was a French historian who specialized in the history of landscaping and gardening. He was an honorary professor of the Écoles nationales supérieures d'architecture.

== Publications ==
- Le Thabor (1990)
- Le jardin du Luxembourg (1991)
- Lyon, le Parc de la Tête d'Or (1992)
- Les Jardins publics en province : Espaces et politique au XIXe siècle (1995)
- La Bretagne des jardins (1997)
- Les jardins publics en France (1997)
- Le Thabor : Rennes (2002)
- Jardin médiéval (2002)
- Les jardins de Villandry (2002)
- Paysages de Rennes : Nature et espaces publics (2005)
- Vents, Invention et Évolution des Formes (2008)
- Le Thabor - Renaissance d'un patrimoine rennais (2013)
- Kerguéhennec - architecture et paysage(s) (2016)

== Distinctions ==
- Gold Medal of the Ligue musicale Maine-Anjou (1977)
- Knight of the Ordre des Palmes académiques (1990)
- Prix des écrivains de l'Ouest (1991)
