= Robert Ferrante =

American news producer (1934–2022)

- Born: Robert Edward Ferrante; October 6, 1934; Boston, Massachusetts, U.S.
- Died: September 15, 2022 (aged 87); Cambridge, Massachusetts, U.S.
- Education: Boston University
- Occupation: News producer
- Children: 1

Robert Edward Ferrante (October 6, 1934 – September 15, 2022) was an American news producer.

== Biography ==
Ferrante was born in Boston, Massachusetts, the son of Anna Castellucci and Pasquale Ferrante, a bank teller. He was raised in Arlington, Massachusetts and attended pharmacy school. Ferrante attended Boston University, where he earned a bachelor's degree in journalism in 1957. He worked for the television station WNAC, where he described the aftermath of the John F. Kennedy assassination.

Ferrante served as the news director for stations in numerous cities. He moved to Boston, Massachusetts, where he had worked at the WGBH-TV. Ferrante got WGBH-TV an Emmy Award, in which it was described as best news station. After that, he was hired by the CBS News to serve as the executive producer for the CBS Overnight News. He also produced for the CBS Morning News and had worked for the public radio news magazine The World.

Ferrante served as a member of the Democratic National Committee. He was then hired by NPR to work for the Morning Edition. Ferrante died in Cambridge, Massachusetts, on September 15, 2022, at the age of 87.
