= Salvatore Biasco =

Italian economist and politician (1939–2022)

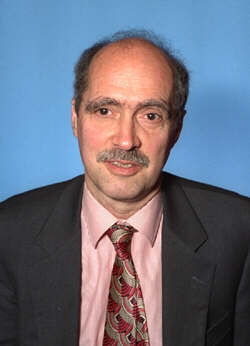
- Biasco in 1996

Member of the Chamber of Deputies of Italy
- In office 27 April 1996 – 29 May 2001

Personal details
- Born: 31 December 1939 Rome, Italy
- Died: 6 September 2022 (aged 82)
- Party: PDS
- Education: Trinity College, Cambridge
- Occupation: Economist

Salvatore Biasco (31 December 1939 – 6 September 2022) was an Italian economist and politician. A member of the Democratic Party of the Left, he served in the Chamber of Deputies from 1996 to 2001.

Biasco died on 6 September 2022, at the age of 82.
