= Republic of Korea Army College =

Location
- Yuseong District; South Korea
- 35.9986°N 128.9347°E

Information
- Grades: College

Republic of Korea Army College (abbreviated ROKA College) is a college located in Yuseong-gu, South Korea.

== See also ==
- Korea Military Academy
