= Willard N. Young =

American politician

Member of the New Hampshire House of Representatives from the Hillsborough 19th district
- In office 1988–1990

Personal details
- Born: South Paris, Maine, U.S.
- Died: September 25, 2022 (aged 89)
- Party: Republican

Willard N. Young (died September 25, 2022) was an American politician. He served as a Republican member for the Hillsborough 19th district of the New Hampshire House of Representatives.

== Life and career ==
Young was born in South Paris, Maine. He served in the United States Air Force for four years.

Young served in the New Hampshire House of Representatives from 1988 to 1990.

Young died in September 2022, at the age of 89.
