= Alan Richwald =

Explosive ordnance disposal expert

MSG (Ret.) Alan Richwald
- Born: 11 February 1938; Queens, New York, United States
- Died: 19 September 2022 (aged 84); Berwyn Heights, Maryland, United States
- Citizenship: United States
- Occupation: Equipment specialist (ordnance)
- Spouse: Christina Richwald (1967 - 2022)

Alan Richwald was an American explosive ordnance disposal (EOD) expert in the U.S. Army.

== Personal life ==
Alan Richwald was adopted by advertising executive Marvin Richwald and his wife Martha. Martha died when Alan was four, and Marvin soon married a second wife, Ann. Richwald was raised with stepsister Ina and half-brother Gary.

After World War II, young Richwald acted as a volunteer plane spotter. Richwald attended boarding school, and after graduation, he entered the U.S. Army as an EOD specialist in 1956.

He married Christina Richwald in 1967, fathering three children. He entered the Catholic Church in 1990. He was diagnosed with Parkinson's Disease in 1997. He retired and moved to Maryland in 2019 and died peacefully in 2022.

== Explosive Ordnance Disposal ==
Starting with his EOD training in 1957, Richwald identified, catalogued, defused, and wrote guidebooks about thousands of enemy bombs, mines, shells, and grenades. He served as an EOD specialist in the Vietnam War and spent several years of service in Korea, Japan, and Germany.

In 1971, Richwald was assigned to Picatinny Arsenal in 1971, where he established the EOD Foreign Ordnance Section. Richwald was an expert in locating, recovering, and rendering safe hundreds of first-seen foreign explosives, a quality that led to his being regularly consulted by the intelligence community. He leveraged this experience into training for EOD specialists in person and writing over a thousand reference books on the identification and defusing of foreign ordnance.

Richwald retired from active service in 1980 and retained his EOD position at Picatinny as a civilian, continuing with his writing, his work as a trainer, and the recovery and defusing of first-seen enemy artillery, as well as developing procedures for clearing buildings of booby traps.

As Picatinny Arsenal's Quick Reaction Team's team lead, he supported military operations in 1991 during Operation Desert Storm and in the mid-1990s in the Bosnian War, with additional operational experience ranging from central and north Africa through the Middle East and into central Asia.

Despite being diagnosed with Parkinson's Disease in 1997, he continued his civil service work until 2019, retiring after 57 continuous years of EOD work for the U.S. military.

His personal motto was, "So others may live."

== Legacy ==
On July 7, 2023, the U.S. Army Combat Capabilities Development Command dedicated the Explosive Ordnance Disposal Disassembly and Robotics Complex at Picatinny Arsenal in honor of Richwald. The complex is the first in the U.S. Army specifically dedicated to researching how to protect soldiers by making foreign ordnance safe, including via robotics.

The many publications Richwald created on identifying and disarming enemy ordnance have been used to train soldiers from all four branches of the U.S. armed forces, saving many lives, while he and/or his training materials helped teach identification and safing techniques to nearly every EOD specialist in the U.S. armed forces.

== List of Awards and Patents ==
- 1967 Bronze Star
- 1971 Meritorious Service Medal
- 1975 Legion of Merit
- 2002 Paul A. Volcker Career Achievement
- 2003 Patent: MK38 small caliber dearmer aiming device
- 2010 Ordnance Order of Samuel Sharpe
- 2014 Patent: Secure disrupter unit for explosive ordnance disposal operations and breech plug for same
- 2018 U.S. Army Ordnance Corps Hall of Fame
- The U.S. Ordnance Corps Association also awarded his wife, Christina, the Keeper of the Flame award in 2018.
