= Heiderose Berroth =

German politician (1947–2022)

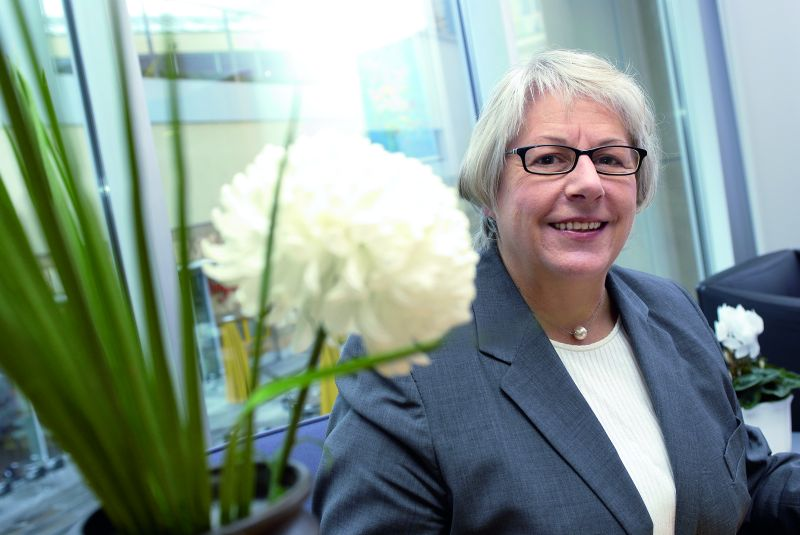
- Berroth in 2009

Member of the Landtag of Baden-Württemberg
- In office April 1996 – March 2011

Personal details
- Born: 2 June 1947 Stuttgart, Württemberg-Baden, Germany
- Died: 13 September 2022 (aged 75)
- Party: FDP
- Education: University of Stuttgart; University of Würzburg
- Occupation: Consultant

Heiderose Berroth (2 June 1947 – 13 September 2022) was a German politician. A member of the Free Democratic Party, she served in the Landtag of Baden-Württemberg from 1996 to 2011.

Berroth died on 13 September 2022, at the age of 75.
