= Zhang Chuanmiao =

Chinese politician (1937–2022)

Member of the National People's Congress
- In office 1993–1998

Personal details
- Born: February 1937 Yiyuan County, China
- Died: 11 September 2022 (aged 85) Shenyang, China
- Party: CCP
- Occupation: Military officer

Zhang Chuanmiao (Chinese: 张传苗; February 1937 – 11 September 2022) was a Chinese politician. A member of the Communist Party, he served on the National People's Congress from 1993 to 1998.

Chuanmiao died in Shenyang on 11 September 2022, at the age of 85.
