= Cristien Polak =

Surinamese diplomat and politician (died 2022)

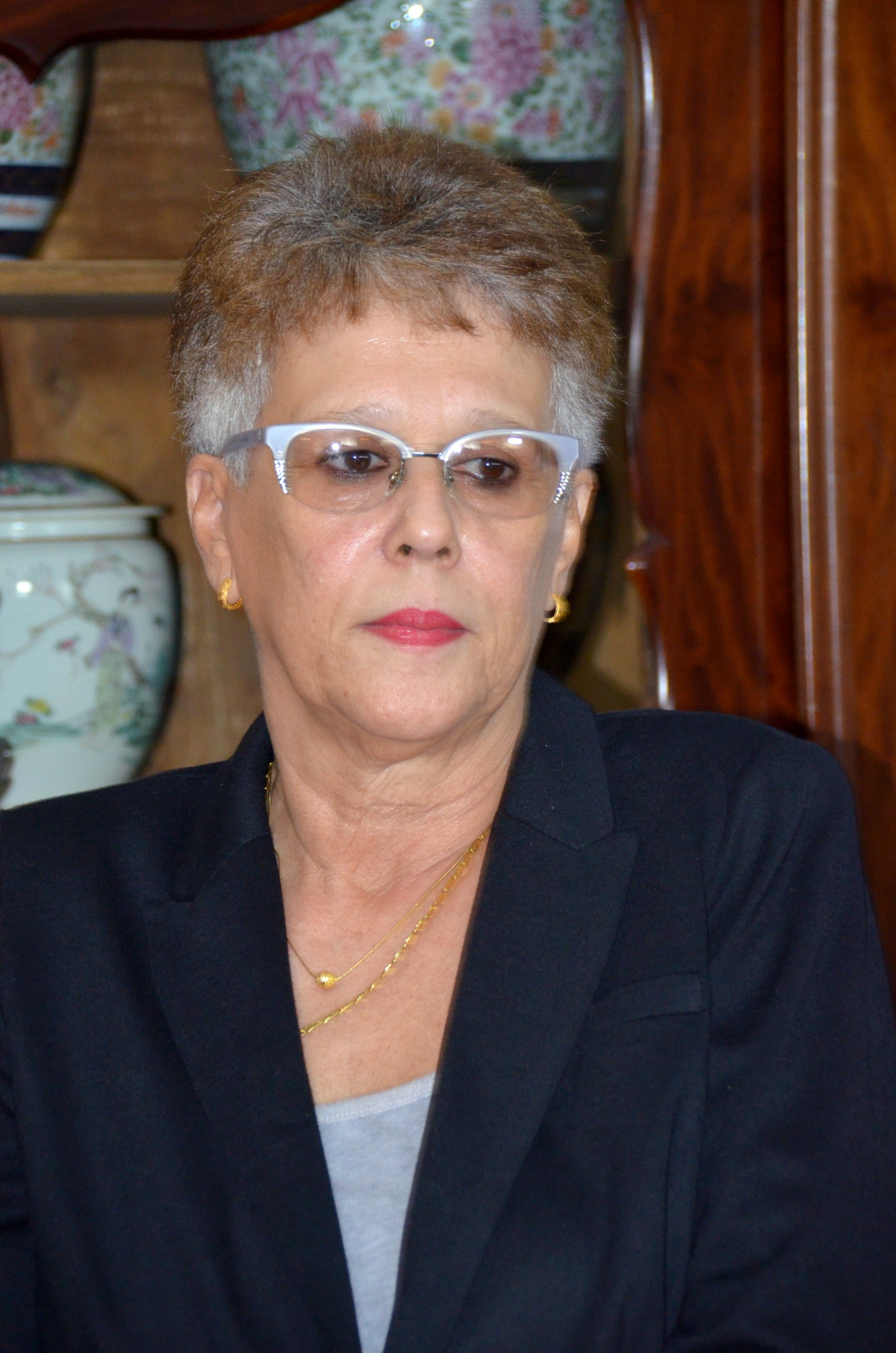

Minister of Social Affairs and Housing
- In office 2017–2019
- Preceded by: Joan Dogojo
- Succeeded by: André Misiekaba

Personal details
- Born: Christine Renate Polak; 4 April 1954
- Died: 26 September 2022 (aged 68)
- Party: NDP
- Education: University of Groningen
- Occupation: Diplomat and politician

Christine "Cristien" Renate Polak (4 April 1954 - 26 September 2022) was a Surinamese politician. A member of the National Democratic Party, she served as Minister of Social Affairs and Housing from 2017 to 2019.

Polak died on 26 September 2022.
