= Elena Elagina =

Russian artist (1949–2022)

Elena Vladimirovna Elagina (July 4, 1949 – September 25, 2022) was a Soviet and Russian artist. She was one of the leading representatives of Moscow conceptualism. She was an Honorary Member of the Russian Academy of Arts. She was the wife and collaborator of the artist Igor Makarevich, and their work together was considered one of the most successful and long-term unions on the Russian art scene.
