= Dick Eckaus =

American economist (1926–2022)

Richard Samuel Eckaus (April 30, 1926 – September 11, 2022) was an American economist best known for his work in development and international economics and his career as a professor and department chair at the Massachusetts Institute of Technology (MIT).

Born in Kansas City, Missouri, on April 30, 1926, Richard Eckaus was the youngest of three children of Lithuanian immigrants Julius Eckaus (a tailor) and Bessie Eckaus (née Finkelstein). Richard graduated from Westport High School before joining the United States Navy. He used a naval scholarship to attend Iowa State University, from which he graduated in 1944 with a degree in electrical engineering. Eckaus received a master's degree in economics from Washington University in St. Louis (WashU) in 1958, having studied there on the GI Bill.

Eckaus relocated to Boston, Massachusetts, and served as an instructor of economics at the Babson Institute from 1951 to 1962 while earing his Ph.D. (awarded in 1954) at MIT. He also taught at WashU and Michigan State University. At MIT, Eckaus was mentored by Paul Rosenstein-Rodan, a development economist. Eckaus began his career at MIT in 1962, where he taught development economics and served as the head of the economics department from 1986 to 1990. During his time at MIT both as a Ph.D. candidate and as a professor, Eckaus advised the governments of Italy and India on economic systems development. While the Italian government was preparing their 1954 ten-year development plan, Eckaus contributed to their studies of the north–south economic divide. In India, he studied with Louis Lefeber the technical and engineering aspects of economic development during the 1961 Indian Plan era.

Eckaus retired in 1996 and died in Boston on September 11, 2022, at age 96. At the time of his death, he held the title of emeritus Ford Foundation International Professor of Economics.
