= Pierre Tournier =

French footballer (1934–2022)

Personal information
- Date of birth: 25 February 1934
- Place of birth: Belfort, France
- Date of death: September 2022 (aged 88)
- Place of death: Beaulieu-sur-Mer, France
- Height: 1.64 m (5 ft 5 in)
- Position: Midfielder

Senior career*
Years	Team	Apps	(Gls)
1952–1954	ASM Belfort		
1953–1954	Sochaux		
1954–1957	Montpellier	111	(10)
1957–1958	Marseille	8	(0)
1958–1959	Troyes-Savinienne	42	(7)
1959–1966	Rouen	254	(6)

Managerial career
- 1968–1969: US Saint-Malo
- 1971: Rouen
- 1979–1980: Sochaux B
- * Club domestic league appearances and goals

Pierre Tournier (25 February 1934 – September 2022) was a French football player and manager who played as a midfielder.

== Biography ==
Tournier played for multiple clubs in Division 1, such as SO Montpellier, Olympique de Marseille, and FC Rouen. In total, he completed 415 professional matches, 206 of which were in Division 1.

After his playing career, he coached US Saint-Malo of the Championnat de France Amateur, completed his coaching diploma in 1968.

In 1972, Tournier was named a conseiller technique régional of the Ligue lorraine de football. He then became manager of the FC Sochaux training center, where he trained footballers such as Joël Bats, Bernard Genghini, and Philippe Anziani. In 1982, Jean-Louis Campora recruited him to manage the training facility at AS Monaco. He left the club in 1997 and retired from all football activities.

Tournier died in Beaulieu-sur-Mer in September 2022, at the age of 88.
