= Tim Leggatt =

English author (1933–2022)

Timothy William Leggatt (29 November 1933 – 22 September 2022) was an English author, and academic and media consultant. Leggatt worked for the P&O Steam Navigation Company in Calcutta, India, 1958–1959. He was senior tutor at King's College, Cambridge, 1973–1981. He was a planning controller at The Royal Shakespeare Company, London and Stratford in 1984–1988. He also acted in theater including Wild Honey in 2001.

== Books ==
- New Commonwealth students in Britain: with special reference to students from East Africa /P.E.P., Political and Economic Planning 1965.
- Sociological Theory and Survey Research: Institutional Change and Social Policy in Great Britain, Sage Publications, 1974 (Edited).
- The Evolution of Industrial Systems, Croom Helm, 1985; republished by Routledge 2019.
- Connecting with E. M. Forster: A Memoir, Hesperus Press, 2012.
