= Ihor Bezohlyuk =

Ukrainian military serviceman (1972–2022)

- Born: March 14, 1972; Volodarka, Kyiv Oblast, Ukrainian SSR
- Died: September 26, 2022 (aged 50); Kharkiv Oblast, Ukraine
- Military career
- Allegiance: Ukraine
- Branch: Armed Forces of Ukraine
- Rank: Lieutenant Colonel
- Conflicts: Russo-Ukrainian War; Russian invasion of Ukraine
- Awards: Order of Bohdan Khmelnytsky 3rd class

Ihor Bezohlyuk (Ukrainian: Ігор Анатолійович Безоглюк; March 14, 1972 – September 26, 2022) was a Ukrainian military serviceman, lieutenant colonel of the Armed Forces of Ukraine, and participant in the Russian-Ukrainian war. He was a recipient of the Order of Bohdan Khmelnytsky 3rd class (2022).

== Biography ==
Bezohlyuk was born on March 14, 1972, in the village of Volodarka, Kyiv region. He grew up and studied in the city of Kyiv. He graduated from general educational institution No. 256, after which he entered the Kyiv Military Academy for a scout course, but as a result of the reorganization, he graduated from the Odesa Military Academy, graduating in 1993.

He retired from the army in 2010. He served in the 95th Airborne Brigade, the Research Institute of the Ground Forces and other units.

In 2014, he became one of the co-founders of the Ukrainian Legion organization. In 2014, he went to Pisky, Donetsk region, and since May 2015, he served as the deputy commander of the combat training regiment of the Azov SPD.

Company commander, anti-tank officer of the 130th battalion of the 112th separate territorial defense brigade.

Bezoglyuk died on September 26, 2022, during the detonation of an armored car on an enemy mine in the liberated part of the Kharkiv region.

== Awards ==
- Order of Bohdan Khmelnytsky III class (September 6, 2022) — for personal courage and selfless actions shown in the defense of the state sovereignty and territorial integrity of Ukraine, loyalty to the military oath.
- award of the Ministry of Defense of Ukraine medal "For conscientious service" II degree (November 8, 2006)
- award of the Ministry of Defense of Ukraine medal "For conscientious service" 1st degree (November 5, 2009)
- award of the President of Ukraine "For participation in the anti-terrorist operation" (February 17, 2016)
- medal "For the defense of the native state" (March 26, 2016) — for steadfastness, personal courage and heroism, high professionalism, exemplary performance of official duty, which were demonstrated in the defense of the independence and territorial integrity of Ukraine in the ATO zone.
- honorary award "For the defense of Mariupol" (October 11, 2017)
- award of the National Security and Defense Council of Ukraine III degree (August 18, 2021)

== Sources ==
- На Харківщині із солдатами загинув співзасновник «Українського легіону» підполковник Ігор Безоглюк // Новинарня. — 2022. — 28 вересня.
- Екскурсія в «Азов». Один день із українським полком спецпризначення // Радіо Свобода. — 2022. — 21 червня.
