= Lothar Hübner =

German politician (1955–2022)

Member of the Landtag of Bavaria
- In office 1 January 1994 – 13 October 1994

Personal details
- Born: 26 October 1955 Würzburg, Bavaria, West Germany
- Died: 12 September 2022 (aged 66) Neustadt an der Aisch, Bavaria, Germany
- Party: Social Democratic Party of Germany
- Occupation: Schoolteacher

Lothar Hübner (26 October 1955 – 12 September 2022) was a German politician. A member of the Social Democratic Party of Germany, he served in the Landtag of Bavaria from January to October 1994.

Hübner died in Neustadt an der Aisch on 12 September 2022, at the age of 66.
