= John Pearce (footballer) =

English footballer (1940–2022)

Personal information
- Full name: John Arthur Pearce
- Date of birth: 29 February 1940
- Place of birth: Grimsby, England
- Date of death: 30 September 2022 (aged 82)
- Place of death: Waltham, England
- Position: Wing half

Senior career*
Years	Team	Apps	(Gls)
1958–1963	Grimsby Town	48	(0)
1963–196?	Gainsborough Trinity		
- * Club domestic league appearances and goals

John Arthur Pearce (29 February 1940 – 30 September 2022) was an English professional footballer who played as a wing half.

Pearce died in Waltham on 30 September 2022, at the age of 82.
