= Ioannis Dimopoulos =

Greek lawyer and politician (1932–2022)

Member of the Hellenic Parliament
- In office 17 November 1974 – 19 September 1981
- Constituency: Electoral district of Imathia

Member of the European Parliament
- In office 1 January 1981 – 18 October 1981
- Constituency: Greece

Personal details
- Born: 6 June 1932 Vrontou, Pieria, Greece
- Died: 22 September 2022 (aged 90) Pylaia, Greece
- Party: ND
- Education: Aristotle University of Thessaloniki
- Occupation: Lawyer

Ioannis Dimopoulos (Greek: Γιάννης Δημόπουλος; 6 June 1932 – 22 September 2022) was a Greek politician. A member of the New Democracy party, he served in the Hellenic Parliament from 1974 to 1981 and in the European Parliament from January to October 1981.

Dimopoulos died in Pylaia on 22 September 2022 at the age of 90.
