= Wang Wei (politician, born 1974) =

Chinese politician (1974–2022)

Member of the National People's Congress
- In office 5 March 2018 – 22 September 2022

Personal details
- Born: April 1974 Shenyang, China
- Died: 22 September 2022 (aged 48) Beijing, China
- Party: CCP

Wang Wei (Chinese: 王巍; April 1974 – 22 September 2022) was a Chinese politician. A member of the Communist Party, he served in the National People's Congress from 2018 to 2022.

Wang died in Beijing on 22 September 2022, at the age of 48.
