= Li Xiyin =

Chinese lexicographer and politician (1926–2022)

Member of the National People's Congress
- In office 1988–1998

Personal details
- Born: 20 May 1926 Shaoxing Xian, Zhejiang, China
- Died: 5 September 2022 (aged 96) Wanning, China
- Education: Yenching University; Heilongjiang University
- Occupation: Lexicographer

Li Xiyin (Chinese: 李锡胤; 20 May 1926 – 5 September 2022) was a Chinese lexicographer and politician. He served in the National People's Congress from 1988 to 1998.

Li died in Wanning on 5 September 2022, at the age of 96.
