= Park Byeong-yun =

South Korean politician (1941–2022)

Member of the National Assembly of South Korea
- In office 30 May 2000 – 29 May 2004
- Preceded by: Kim Eui-jae
- Succeeded by: Baek Won-woo; Cho Jeong-sik
- Constituency: Siheung

Personal details
- Born: 19 April 1941 Naju, Korea, Empire of Japan
- Died: 14 September 2022 (aged 81)
- Party: MDP
- Education: Seoul National University
- Occupation: Journalist

Park Byeong-yun (Korean: 박병윤; 19 April 1941 – 14 September 2022) was a South Korean politician. A member of the Millennium Democratic Party, he served in the National Assembly from 2000 to 2004.

Park died on 14 September 2022, at the age of 81.
