= Hilda Žīgure =

Latvian actress (1918–2022)

- Born: 2 March 1918; Latvia
- Died: 6 September 2022 (aged 104); Riga, Latvia
- Occupation: Actress
- Years active: 1944–1986

Hilda Žīgure (2 March 1918 – 6 September 2022) was a Latvian stage actress. She was one of the founders of the Latvian Puppet Theater and worked there until 1986. She received the honorary title of Meritorious Stage Artist of the Latvian SSR in 1967.

== Biography ==
Žīgure studied acting at Latvian dramatic courses between 1936 and 1938. In 1942, Žīgure, being a refugee in Ivanovo, together with her brother Jānis Žīgurs, poet Mirdza Ķempi and other Latvians created a puppet ensemble. In 1944, a puppet theater was formed from the ensemble. At the end of World War II, the theater returned to Latvia. Jānis Žīgurs became the director of the puppet theater, Mirdza Ķempe became the artistic director, and Žīgure became one of the leading actresses. Thus, Žīgure was one of the founders of the Latvian Puppet Theater and she worked there until 1986.

In 1967, Žīgure received the honorary title of Meritorious Stage Artist of the Latvian SSR. She died on 6 September 2022, at the age of 104.
