= Yakov Gorelnikov =

Kazakh actor and politician (1947–2022)

Member of the Supreme Council of Kazakhstan
- In office 1994–1995

Personal details
- Born: Yakov Veniaminovich Gorelnikov; 8 September 1947 Semipalatinsk, Kazakh SSR, Soviet Union
- Died: 18 September 2022 (aged 75) Semey, Kazakhstan
- Party: Independent
- Education: Novosibirsk State Theater Institute
- Occupation: Actor

Yakov Veniaminovich Gorelnikov (Russian: Яков Вениаминович Горельников; 8 September 1947 – 18 September 2022) was a Kazakh actor and politician. An independent, he served on the Supreme Council of Kazakhstan from 1994 to 1995.

Gorelnikov died in Semey on 18 September 2022, at the age of 75.
