= Zhu Yinghao =

Chinese transformer expert (1929–2022)

- 朱英浩
- Born: 24 May 1929; Shanghai, China
- Died: 1 September 2022 (aged 93); Shenyang, Liaoning, China
- Education: Chiao Tung University
- Scientific career
- Fields: Transformer
- Workplaces: Shenyang Transformer Works; Shenyang University of Technology

Zhu Yinghao (Chinese: 朱英浩; pinyin: Zhū Yīnghào; 24 May 1929 – 1 September 2022) was a Chinese transformer expert, and an academician of the Chinese Academy of Engineering.

== Biography ==
Zhu was born in Shanghai, on 24 May 1929, while his ancestral home was in Yin County (now Ningbo), Zhejiang.In 1949, he entered Chiao Tung University, majoring in the Department of Electrical Engineering.

After graduation in 1952, he became a designer and technician at Shenyang Transformer Works (沈阳变压器厂).He moved up the ranks to became an engineer in December 1956, deputy chief engineer in December 1985, and chief engineer in February 1990. He joined the Chinese Communist Party (CCP) in December 1974. In January 2008, he was hired as a professor at the School of Electrical Engineering, Shenyang University of Technology.

On 1 September 2022, he died from an illness in Shenyang, Liaoning at the age of 93.

== Contributions ==
Zhu presided over the development of 2250 kV test transformer, which can be used outdoors, and its working voltage has reached the highest level in the world. He also presided over the development of China's 500 kV 360 MVA three-phase transformer.

== Honours and awards ==
- 1987 State Science and Technology Progress Award
- 1988 State Science and Technology Progress Award
- 1995 Member of the Chinese Academy of Engineering (CAE)
