= Zhan Bingyan =

Chinese urologist and politician (1928–2022)

Member of the National People's Congress
- In office March 1993 – March 1998

Personal details
- Born: November 1928 Changyang Tujia Autonomous County, Hubei, China
- Died: 4 September 2022 (aged 93) Wuhan, Hubei, China
- Party: CCP
- Education: Wuchang Provincial Medical School
- Occupation: Urologist

Zhan Bingyan (Chinese: 詹炳炎; November 1928 – 4 September 2022) was a Chinese urologist and politician. A member of the Communist Party, he served on the National People's Congress from 1993 to 1998.

Zhan died in Wuhan on 4 September 2022 at the age of 93.
