= Michel Ameller =

French government official (1926–2022)

Member of the Constitutional Council
- In office 8 March 1995 – 8 March 2004
- Preceded by: Robert Fabre
- Succeeded by: Jean-Louis Pezant

General Secretary of the French National Assembly
- In office 1985–1992
- Preceded by: Paul Amiot
- Succeeded by: Pierre Hontebeyrie

Personal details
- Born: 1 January 1926 El Attaf, French Algeria
- Died: 28 September 2022 (aged 96) Paris, France
- Education: Sciences Po; Algiers Faculty of Law; Paris Faculty of Law and Economics
- Occupation: Government official

Michel Ameller (1 January 1926 – 28 September 2022) was a French government official. He was a member of the Constitutional Council from 1995 to 2004.

== Biography ==
Ameller studied at the Algiers Faculty of Law. He was General Secretary of the National Assembly from 1985 to 1992, spending his entire career at the Palais Bourbon beginning in 1952. He was the father of architect Philippe Ameller and photographer Thierry Ameller.

Ameller died in Paris on 28 September 2022, at the age of 96.

== Decorations ==
- Grand Officer of the Legion of Honour
- Grand Cross of the Ordre national du Mérite
- Commander of the Order of Francisco de Miranda
- Commander of the Order of the Liberator
