= Alfred Michael =

American physician (1928–2022)

Alfred Frederick Michael, Jr.
- Born: August 10, 1928
- Died: September 25, 2022 (aged 94)
- Education: Temple University
- Occupations: Physician and medical educator and scientist.

Alfred Michael (August 10, 1928 – September 25, 2022) was an American physician and medical educator and scientist. He was Emeritus Regents' Professor and Dean of the university of Minnesota Medical School and previously served as chair of the department of pediatrics. He was Regents' Professor and dean of the University of Minnesota Medical School. He was elected a Fellow of the American Association for the Advancement of Science. He was president of the American Society of Nephrology from which he received the Peters Award. He received numerous other awards and was a member of numerous academic and scientific societies. A cited expert in his field, his interests were in pediatrics.

== Education ==
He earned his undergraduate and medical degrees at Temple University before serving at Philadelphia's Saint Christopher's Hospital for Children and Cincinnati Children's Hospital before teaching.
