= José García Buitrón =

Spanish doctor and politician (1945–2022)

Member of the Senate of Spain
- In office 20 December 2015 – 2 May 2016
- Constituency: A Coruña

Personal details
- Born: José Manuel García Buitrón; 14 June 1945 Toreno, Spain
- Died: 17 September 2022 (aged 77) Madrid, Spain
- Party: PSOE
- Education: University of Santiago de Compostela
- Occupation: Doctor

José Manuel García Buitrón (14 June 1945 – 17 September 2022) was a Spanish doctor and politician. A member of the Spanish Socialist Workers' Party, he served in the Senate of Spain from 2015 to 2016.

García died in Madrid on 17 September 2022, at the age of 77.
