= Page Pate =

American attorney (1967–2022)

Page Pate (May 3, 1967 – September 11, 2022) was an American attorney and legal commentator at the Atlanta, Georgia-based law firm Pate, Johnson & Church. He had been a practicing trial lawyer for over 25 years when he died in September 2022, and he also had extensive experience in criminal defense. He was a founding member of the Georgia Innocence Project and frequently provided legal commentary to CNN, the New York Times, and other major media outlets.

== Biography ==
A native of Dublin, Georgia, Pate received his undergraduate degree from Georgia State University, from which he graduated with honors, and his Juris Doctor degree from the University of Georgia Law School in 1994. He was named one of the best trial lawyers in the United States by the National Trial Lawyers Association and one of "The Best Lawyers in America" by U.S. News & World Report. He was also named on the list of Super Lawyers for twelve consecutive years.

On September 11, 2022, while swimming with his son at Gould's Inlet off the coast of St. Simons Island, Georgia, Pate was caught in a rip current. While his son was able to swim to shore safely, Pate was not, and a water rescue team took Pate to the Southeast Georgia Health System hospital in Brunswick, where he was pronounced dead from drowning that afternoon at the age of 55.
