= Fahad Al Rajaan =

Kuwaiti businessman (1948–2022)

- Born: 23 December 1948
- Died: September 6, 2022 (aged 73); London
- Occupation: Banker

Fahad Maziad Al Rajaan (23 December 1948 – 6 September 2022) was a Kuwaiti banker. From 1992 to 2015, Fahad Al Rajaan served as Company Director of Ahli United Bank (UK) Plc.

== Career ==
Al Rajaan was born in Kuwait. He acted as the director general of the Public Institution For Social Security Fund in Kuwait (PIFSS) since 1984. The PIFSS operates a comprehensive and publicly beneficial welfare systems for Kuwaiti citizens. Al Rajaan believed that the socio-economic success of Kuwait is based on oil reserves, the relatively small population, democracy, lack of debt and the constitution. The Kuwaiti pension scheme has been recognised as one of the highest in terms of benefits.

Alongside his work at the PIFSS, Al Rajaan had held a number of senior roles within the finance industry. As chairman of the Ahli United Bank had responsibility for the largest lender by market in Bahrain and a major commercial and investment banking group. He also held the chairmanship of Wafra Investment Advisory Group in New York, which was established primarily to invest monies from the PIFSS.

== Personal life ==
Fahad Al Rajaan was educated at the American University of Washington DC in the United States, attaining a bachelor's degree in Business Administration in 1975. A keen golfer, Al Rajaan won the prestigious 21st Dubai Duty Free Golf Cup at the Dubai Creek Golf and Yacht Club in 2013 with 42 stapleford points and a one shot victory, after 20 years of amateur play in the sport.

== Corruption conviction ==
Fahad Al Rajaan as well as his wife and children had their assets frozen in Kuwait due to criminal complaints alleging misconduct during his time as head of Public Institute for Social Security (PIFSS). He was wanted by Interpol and actively hid abroad.

Minister of Justice, Minister of State for National Assembly Affairs Dr Faleh Abdullah Al-Azeb recently affirmed Kuwait will continue to chase former director general of the Public Institute for Social Security Fahd Al-Raja’an, even if he leaves Britain. He is wanted in Kuwait for embezzling large sums of public money.

Al-Rajaan was arrested in April 2017 in London on behalf of Kuwait, which had convicted him of corruption and embezzlement in absentia.

In June 2019, both Al-Rajaan and his spouse were given life sentences in absentia by the Kuwait criminal court; personal property was confiscated, and they were ordered to repay $82 million, as well as being fined twice that amount.
