= Stephen Webre =

American historian

- Born: Stephen Andrew Webre; October 13, 1946; Baton Rouge, Louisiana, U.S.
- Died: September 12, 2022 (aged 75); Ruston, Louisiana, U.S.
- Education: University of Louisiana at Lafayette; Tulane University
- Occupation: Historian
- Spouse: Karen Malone

Stephen Andrew Webre (October 13, 1946 – September 12, 2022) was an American historian.

== Life and career ==
Webre was born in Baton Rouge, Louisiana, the son of Andrew Webre and Jayne Ellis Farrar. He attended the University of Louisiana at Lafayette, earning his BA degree in history. After earning his degree, he served in the United States Navy during the Vietnam War, which after his discharge, he attended Tulane University, earning his MA degree and PhD degree in Latin American history.

Webre served as a professor in the department of history at Louisiana Tech University from 1982 to 2017. During his years as a professor, in 2006, he was named the William Y. Thompson Endowed Professor.

== Personal life and death ==
Webre was married to Karen Malone. Their marriage lasted until Webre's death in 2022.

Webre died of cancer at his home in Ruston, Louisiana on September 12, 2022, at the age of 75.
