= Simon Ibo =

French singer, actor and politician (1940–2022)

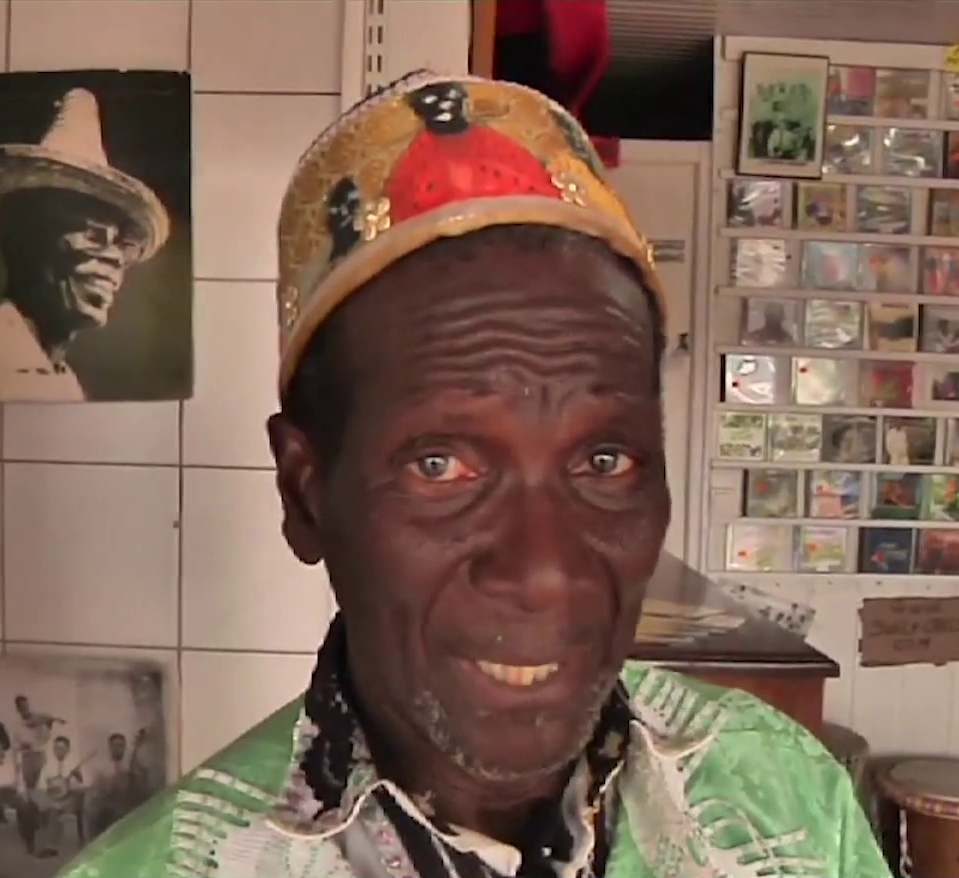
- Simon Ibo during the 2010s.

Member of the Regional Council of Guadeloupe
- In office 1998–2003

Member of the Municipal Council of Pointe-à-Pitre
- In office 1995–2003

Personal details
- Born: 20 March 1940 Basse-Terre, Guadeloupe, France
- Died: 24 September 2022 (aged 82)
- Party: Guadeloupe debout Independent
- Occupation: Singer; Actor

Simon Ibo (20 March 1940 – 24 September 2022), also known as Ibo Simon, was a French actor, singer, and politician of the far-right.

== Biography ==
Ibo was born on 20 March 1940 in Basse-Terre to a modest family. He attended very little education and did not receive his Certificat d'études primaires. He then moved to Île-de-France, where he was a member of a West Indian orchestra. After some legal trouble, he ended up in La Santé Prison.

After his imprisonment, Ibo returned to Guadeloupe and became known there as a singer and actor, notably for his song, Même si je dois mourir un jour, released in 1979. In 1980, he starred in the film Mamito, directed by Christian Lara. In November 2021, he released a reggae reprise of the song Même si je dois mourir un jour alongside Daddy Yod.

In 1992, Ibo became the host of his own segment on Canal 10, where he reacted to current events live on air. In 2001, he made multiple racist remarks against Haitians on television. On 4 September 2001, Canal 10 received a notice from the Conseil supérieur de l'audiovisuel following a motion by the Movement Against Racism and for Friendship between Peoples and the Groupe d'information et de soutien des immigrés denouncing the words of Ibo. He was then suspended from the television channel.

In 1995, Ibo entered politics and participated in the municipal election of Point-à-Pitre, where he was elected to the municipal council with 8% of the vote. In 1997, he ran for a seat in the National Assembly and failed to qualify for the second round after earning 14.56% of the vote in the first round. In 1998, he ran for the Regional Council of Guadeloupe and was elected with 5.7% of the vote.

In 2001, Ibo earned 22% of the vote in the mayoral election of Point-à-Pitre and qualified for the second round. Although he was not successful, he maintained his mandate on the municipal council. In May 2001, he co-founded the party Guadeloupe debout alongside former Rally for the Republic member Louis Dessout and subsequently became party president. On 22 July 2001, he led a group to attack a Dominican family and ransack their home, an event filmed and broadcast live by Canal 10.

In 2002, Ibo again ran for a seat in the National Assembly in Guadeloupe's 1st constituency. He earned 12.51% of the vote and failed to qualify for the second round. In November 2003, he was stripped of his mandates as municipal councilor and regional councilor after a conviction of incitement to racial hatred. He was unable to hold any public office for two years afterwards.

In 2007, Ibo tried for a third time to earn a seat in the National Assembly, earning 6.61% of the first round vote and failing to qualify for the second round. In 2015, he unsuccessfully ran for leadership of the Canton of Les Abymes-3, earning 11.35% of the vote.

Simon Ibo died on 24 September 2022 at the age of 82.

== Discography ==
- Doubout ! (1979)
- Ibo Simon (1979)
- Ibo Simon (1980)
- Bo (1981)
- Danger (2012)
