= Li Qiwan =

Chinese politician (1935–2022)

Member of the National People's Congress
- In office June 1983 – March 1988

Personal details
- Born: September 1935 Penglai District, China
- Died: 14 September 2022 (aged 86–87) Jinan, China
- Party: CCP

Li Qiwan (Chinese: 李启万; September 1935 – 14 September 2022) was a Chinese politician. A member of the Chinese Communist Party, he served in the National People's Congress from 1983 to 1988.

Li died in Jinan on 14 September 2022.
