= Paulo Pitta e Cunha =

Portuguese lawyer, professor, and politician (1937–2022)

Member of the Assembly of the Republic of Portugal
- In office 3 June 1976 – 2 January 1980
- Constituency: Lisbon

Personal details
- Born: Paulo de Pitta e Cunha; 27 February 1937 Lisbon, Portugal
- Died: 8 September 2022 (aged 85)
- Party: PSD
- Occupation: Lawyer; Professor

Paulo de Pitta e Cunha (27 February 1937 – 8 September 2022) was a Portuguese lawyer, professor, and politician. A member of the Social Democratic Party, he served in the Assembly of the Republic from 1976 to 1980.

Pitta died on 8 September 2022, at the age of 85.
