= Cecile Janssens =

Dutch epidemiologist (1968–2022)

A. Cecile J.W. Janssens
- Born: Anna Caecilia Josephina Wilhelmina Janssens; 15 June 1968; Oisterwijk, Netherlands
- Died: 8 September 2022 (aged 54)
- Education: Hogeschool 's-Hertogenbosch; Utrecht University; Erasmus University Rotterdam
- Known for: Research on applications of genomics to medicine
- Scientific career
- Fields: Epidemiology
- Institutions: Emory University
- Thesis: Perception of Prognostic Risk in Multiple Sclerosis (2003)

Anna Caecilia Josephina Wilhelmina Janssens (15 June 1968 – 8 September 2022) was a Dutch epidemiologist and research professor of translational epidemiology at the Rollins School of Public Health of Emory University in Atlanta, Georgia, United States. Much of her research focused on polygenic score-based genetic risk prediction for complex diseases like diabetes and cardiovascular disease, of which she was critical. She also criticized what she considered an excessive focus on the role of genetics in attempts to prevent and treat human diseases.

On 17 June 2022, it was announced that Janssens was nominated by the Cabinet of the Netherlands to become Member of the Scientific Council for Government Policy.
