= Paolo Tringali =

Italian trade unionist and politician (1925–2022)

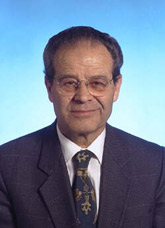
- Tringali in 1996

Member of the Chamber of Deputies of Italy
- In office 13 April 1983 – 1 July 1987
- Constituency: Catania-Messina-Syracuse-Ragusa-Enna
- In office 15 April 1994 – 29 May 2001
- Constituency: Sicily 2

Personal details
- Born: 31 August 1925 Catania, Italy
- Died: 26 September 2022 (aged 97) Acireale, Italy
- Party: MSI–DN (until 1995); AN (1995–2009)
- Occupation: Trade unionist

Paolo Tringali (31 August 1925 – 26 September 2022) was an Italian politician. A member of the Italian Social Movement – National Right, he served in the Chamber of Deputies from 1983 to 1987 and from 1994 to 2001.

Tringali died in Acireale on 26 September 2022, at the age of 97.
