= 2022 in Greece =

- Decades: 2000s; 2010s; 2020s
- See also: Other events of 2022; List of years in Greece

Events in the year 2022 in Greece.

== Incumbents ==
Photo	Post	Name
	President of the Hellenic Republic	Katerina Sakellaropoulou
	Prime Minister of Greece	Kyriakos Mitsotakis
	Speaker of the Hellenic Parliament	Konstantinos Tasoulas
	Adjutant to the President of the Hellenic Republic	Air Force Colonel Dimitrios Papadimitriou (leaving July)
	Adjutant to the President of the Hellenic Republic	Air Force Lieutenant Colonel Anastasios Pantikakis (starting July)
	Adjutant to the President of the Hellenic Republic	Navy Kalliopi Poroglou
	Adjutant to the President of the Hellenic Republic	Army Lieutenant Colonel Kyriakos Tzivris

== Events ==
- Ongoing: COVID-19 pandemic in Greece
- January 4 – Greece reports a record 50,126 new cases of COVID-19 in the past 24 hours, thereby bringing the nationwide total of confirmed cases to 1,344,923.
- January 9 – The Greek government announces that fully vaccinated people who have not received a COVID-19 vaccine booster dose seven months after receiving their second dose will be banned from entering most indoor venues and participating in many types of activities beginning on February 1.
- January 17 – Greece begins to introduce monthly fines for people over the age of 60 who are unvaccinated against COVID-19 amid an increase in the number of new cases in the country. The monthly fine will initially be €50 this month and will be €100 per month thereafter.
- January 29 – Death of Georgina Patras, which would spark the investigation into the Patras sisters death case.
- February 18 – Eleven people are missing after a ferry travelling between Greece and Italy catches fire.
- April 19 – Greece seizes Russian-flagged oil tanker Pegas/Lana off the island of Euboea as part of European Union economic sanctions on Russia. The ship had 19 crew members on board, according to the Ministry of Shipping.
- May 1 – The Greek Civil Aviation announces that Greece has lifted their COVID-19 restrictions for domestic and foreign flights. Passengers will still be required to wear a mask.
- May 11 – Greece bans the practice of conversion therapy for minors as well as all advertisements promoting it.
- May 21 – Greece reports its first case of monkeypox.
- May 26 – The US seizes a Russian owned oil tanker carrying Iranian crude oil in Greece and has transferred the cargo to another ship destined for the US. It is unclear if the seizure was due to US sanctions against Iran or US sanctions on Russia.
- June 1 – Turkish President Recep Tayyip Erdoğan cancels high-level talks with Greek Prime Minister Kyriakos Mitsotakis, accusing Mitsotakis of consistently using Greek jets to violate Turkey's airspace. Turkish Foreign Affairs Minister Mevlüt Çavuşoğlu had also accused Greece of violating the airspace of demilitarized zones in the Aegean Sea yesterday.
- June 5 – A large wildfire breaks out on the Hymettus mountain range near Athens, Greece. A number of homes are damaged in the fire.
- July 11 – Two people are killed and four others are injured after a three car pileup caused by a pack of boars north of Thessaloniki.
- July 13 – Two firefighters are killed and two others survive after a helicopter crashes on the Greek island of Samos.
- July 16 – An Antonov An-12 cargo plane, operated by a Ukrainian airline, crashes near the city of Kavala, Greece, killing all eight people on board. The aircraft was carrying weapons from Serbia to Bangladesh, and crashed before a planned stop in Jordan.
- July 23 – Nine people are rescued after wildfires burn on the island of Lesbos and threaten the resort town of Vatera amid a heat wave in the country.
- August 21 – In tennis, world number 156 Borna Ćorić of Croatia becomes the lowest-ranked champion in the ATP Tour Masters 1000 after defeating Stefanos Tsitsipas of Greece in the men's singles final of the 2022 Cincinnati Masters.
- September 3 – President of Turkey Recep Tayyip Erdoğan accuses Greece of "arming" and "occupying" the demilitarized Aegean islands, with Minister of Foreign Affairs Mevlüt Çavuşoğlu threatening to revoke recognition of Greek sovereignty over the islands if the alleged militarization is not halted.
- October 15 – 2022 Greek floods.

== Deaths ==
- 4 January
  - Andreas Michalopoulos, 73, footballer
  - Stelios Serafidis, 86, footballer
- 16 January – Alekos Fassianos, 86, painter
- 3 February – Christos Sartzetakis, 92, politician
- 16 February – Vasilios Botinos, 77, footballer
- 22 February – Christos Angourakis, 69, athlete
- 25 February – Dimitris Tsovolas, 79, politician
- 27 February – Marietta Giannakou, 70, politician
- 10 March – Dimitris Kontominas, 82, businessman
- 17 March – Elsa Papadimitriou, 80, politician
- 29 March – Irini Konitopoulou-Legaki, 90, singer
- 12 April – Giorgos Katiforis, 87, lawyer
- 25 April – Kostas Karapatis, 94, footballer
- 6 May – Kostas Gousgounis, 91, pornographic actor
- 8 May – Stefanos Petrakis, 97, Olympic sprinter
- 17 May –Vangelis, 79, musician
- 10 June – Sotirios Trambas, 92, prelate
- 13 June –
  - Nikolaos Deligiorgis, 85, magazine editor
  - Marina Lambraki-Plaka, 83, historian
- 19 June – Thalis Tsirimokos, 62, footballer
- 21 June – Nikos Salikas, 81, politician
- 8 July – Athanasios Dimitrakopoulos, 86, politician
- 16 July – Georgios Daskalakis, 86, politician
- 2 August – Stavros Psycharis, 77, politician
- 7 August – Dionysis Simopoulos, 79, astronomer
- 9 August – Dimitris Tsironis, 62, politician
- 21 August – Robert Williams, 72, composer
- 2 September – Georgios Kalamidas, 77, judge
- 13 September –
  - Theophilos Kamberidis, 92, politician
  - Kostas Kazakos, 87, actor
  - Spiros Zournatzis, 86, journalist and politician
- 14 September –
  - Dimitrios Pandermalis, 82, archaeologist
  - Irene Papas, 93, actress
- 18 September – Martha Karagianni, 82, actress
- 30 September – Zahos Hadjifotiou, 99, businessman
- 1 October – Stamatis Kokotas, 85, singer
- 2 October – Themis Katrios, 70, Greek basketball player
- 13 October – Stavros Sarafis, 72, football player
- 14 October – Alexandros Nikolaidis, 42, taekwondo athlete
