= 2024 in Greece =

- Decades: 2000s; 2010s; 2020s
- See also: Other events of 2024; List of years in Greece

Events in the year 2024 in Greece.

== Incumbents ==
- President: Katerina Sakellaropoulou
- Prime Minister: Kyriakos Mitsotakis

== Events ==
=== January ===
- 23 January: Three ancient Greek artefacts, among them a statuette of Terpsichore, are repatriated to Greece from the Michael C. Carlos Museum in Atlanta, after sixteen years of negotiations.

=== February ===
- 6 February: The island of Aegina is left without drinking water after an explosion disables a 12-kilometer-long (7.5-mile) undersea fresh water pipeline. Greater Athens governor Nikos Hardalias calls it an act of sabotage.
- 12 February: A man opens fire at a shipping company in Glyfada, killing three people, before killing himself.
- 15 February: The Hellenic Parliament votes 176–76 to legalise same-sex marriage and adoption, making it the first Eastern Orthodox country to do so.

=== March ===
- 28 March: Prime Minister Kyriakos Mitsotakis survives a no-confidence motion filed by the PASOK party over allegations that it mishandled the investigation into the Tempi train crash in 2023.
- 29 March: Roula Pispirigou was sentenced to life in prison for murdering her eldest daughter Georgina in the Patras sisters death case.

=== May ===
- 3 May: Nikolaos Michaloliakos, the leader of the far-right Golden Dawn party, is granted early release following a legal request and on account of his elderly age, albeit with several conditions such as a ban on traveling outside the greater Athens area. However, the decision is overturned by another panel of judges following an appeal, leading to his arrest on 3 June.
- 16 May: Forty-two migrants and rescued and three others are reported missing after their vessel undergoes an emergency south of Crete.
- 19 May: PAOK wins its fourth Greek championship after beating city rivals Aris 1–2 away on the final matchday of the season.
- 21 May: A court in Kalamata acquits nine Egyptians on charges of human trafficking and manslaughter relating to the 2023 Pylos migrant boat disaster, citing a lack of jurisdiction due to the incident occurring in international waters.

=== June ===
- 9 June – 2024 European Parliament election
- 12 June – Papoura Hill Circular Structure: The Ministry of Culture announces the discovery of a large Bronze Age-era Minoan architectural construction used between 2000 and 1700 BCE at the construction site of the Kasteli Airport in Crete.
- 13 June – A heatwave forces authorities to close the Acropolis for visits during the afternoon.
- 21 June:
  - A wildfire caused by fireworks coming from a yacht destroys 75 acres of pine forest in Hydra. The vessel's crew is subsequently arrested.
  - A volunteer firefighter dies during operations against wildfires in Elis.
- 27 June – A police officer is injured in a firebomb attack on the residence of Supreme Civil and Criminal Court of Greece president Ioanna Klapa outside Athens.

=== July ===
- 1 July – Law 5053/2023, which allows a six-day work week for several industries, officially comes into effect.
- 3 July – MP for Crete and former minister Lefteris Avgenakis is expelled from the ruling New Democracy party following an altercation with an employee at Athens International Airport.
- 4 July – Anti-terrorism police arrest seven people over arson attacks against an Israeli-owned hotel and a synagogue in central Athens.
- 20 July – A border guard is shot and injured while on patrol along the Evros River forming the border with Turkey.
- 29 July – A ban on the commercial slaughter of goats and sheep as well as movement for reproduction of the animals is imposed nationwide following an outbreak of ovine rinderpest that results in the culling of at least 8,200 animals in Thessaly.
- 30 July – A report from a two-year investigation clears the National Intelligence Service, the Hellenic Police and the Special Suppressive Antiterrorist Unit of using Predator spyware in a scandal involving the surveillance of opposition politicians.

=== August ===
- 9 August – The Independent Authority for Public Revenue announces the discovery by the Customs Service of Greece of 93 kilograms of cocaine valued at more than 2.9 million euros from a ship originating from Ecuador that was docked at the port of Thessaloniki.
- 12 August – One person is found dead in Vrilissia following a wildfire that reaches the northern suburbs of Athens.
- 23 August – The Hellenic Coast Guard opens fire on a boat carrying migrants after it tries to ram their vessel near Symi, killing one person.
- 29 August – More than 100 metric tons of dead fish are recovered from the port of Volos following a fish kill believed to have been caused by climate-related complications in Lake Karla. A state of emergency is subsequently declared in the city on 31 August.

=== September ===
- 8 September – Stefanos Kasselakis is removed as leader of Syriza following a motion of no-confidence against him in the party's central committee.
- 17 September – A fire at a refinery of Motor Oil Hellas near Agioi Theodoroi injures three workers and leads to evacuation orders in the surrounding area.
- 18 September – One person is killed in a rockfall at the Samaria Gorge in Crete.
- 23 September – A boat carrying migrants sinks off the coast of Samos, killing four passengers.
- 30 September – Two people are killed in a wildfire near Xylokastro.

=== October ===
- 3 October – The Hellenic Air Force evacuates Greek and Cypriot nationals from Beirut–Rafic Hariri International Airport in Lebanon.
- 9 October – Eleven pilgrims from Romania are hospitalised after ingesting wild mushrooms taken while hiking in Mount Athos.
- 15 October – Four migrants are killed after falling from their boat off the coast of Kos.
- 31 October – One person is killed and another is injured in an explosion believed to have been caused by an improvised bomb at an apartment in Ampelokipoi, Athens.

=== November ===
- 6 November – Four migrants are found dead off the coast of Rhodes after reportedly being thrown overboard by smugglers.
- 21 November – Syriza loses its status as the country's main opposition party following the departure of two of its MPs from the party.
- 25 November – A boat carrying migrants sinks off the coast of Samos, killing eight passengers.
- 28 November – A boat carrying migrants runs aground off the coast of Samos, killing four passengers.
- 30 November–1 December – Three people are killed in Lemnos and Chalkidiki amid extreme weather caused by Storm Bora.
- 30 November – The first line of the Thessaloniki Metro is inaugurated.

=== December ===
- 20 December –
  - A speedboat carrying migrants capsizes the coast of Rhodes, killing eight passengers.
  - The living descendants of Greece's last king, Constantine II, regain Greek citizenship under the surname De Grèce ("of Greece" in French) after being stripped of the status by the Greek government in 1994.
- 30 December – One person is killed after jumping out of a window during a fire at a hotel in Kalambaka, 10 more are left injured.

== Holidays ==
- 1 January - New Year's Day
- 6 January - Epiphany
- 18 March - Clean Monday
- 25 March - Greek Independence Day
- 1 May - Labour Day
- 3 May - Orthodox Good Friday
- 5 May - Orthodox Easter Sunday
- 6 May - Orthodox Easter Monday
- 23 June - Orthodox Whit Sunday
- 24 June - Orthodox Whit Monday
- 15 August - Assumption Day
- 28 October - Greek National Anniversary Day
- 25 December - Christmas Day
- 26 December – Glorifying Mother of God

== Deaths ==
- 6 January – Iasos, 76, Greek-born American musician.
- 15 January – Georgios Darivas, 97, football player (Olympiacos, national team) and manager (Olympiacos).
- 19 January – Sonia Ilinskagia, 86, Greek-Russian writer, translator and professor.
- 20 January – Charis Kostopoulos, 59, singer-songwriter.
- 8 May – Ifigeneia Asteriadi, 57, actress.
- 9 June – Michael Mosley, British doctor and TV presenter who died after he went on a tour in Symi.
- 11 June – Marialena Oikonomidou, 67, Greek singer, cancer.
- 9 October – George Baldock, 31, football player.
- 17 October – Vasso Papandreou, 79, former minister and first Greek woman to become a member of the European Commission.
- 9 November – Yiannis Boutaris, 82, former mayor of Thessaloniki (2011–2019).
- 12 November – Vardis Vardinogiannis, 90, businessman.

== See also ==
- 2024 in the European Union
- 2024 in Europe
