= 2026 in Greece =

- Decades: 2000s; 2010s; 2020s
- See also: Other events of 2026; List of years in Greece

Events in the year 2026 in Greece.

== Incumbents ==
- President: Konstantinos Tasoulas
- Prime Minister: Kyriakos Mitsotakis

== Events ==
=== January ===
- 4 January – A massive interference on aviation radio frequencies causes a total shutdown of Greek airspace, causing major disruptions nationwide.
- 15 January – A court in Lesbos acquits 24 volunteer rescuers from the nonprofit Emergency Response Centre International, including Syrian swimmer Sarah Mardini, on charges of human trafficking over their efforts to rescue migrants arriving in Greece from Turkey.
- 21 January – Two people are killed in separate storm-related incidents in Glyfada and Astros.
- 26 January – Five people are killed in an explosion at the Violanta biscuit factory near Trikala.

=== February ===
- 3 February – A speedboat carrying migrants collides with a patrol vessel of the Hellenic Coast Guard off Chios, killing 15 people.
- 8 February – A mob attack on riot police results in 313 arrests following a raid at the Aristotle University of Thessaloniki.
- 21 February – A boat carrying migrants capsizes off the coast of Kaloi Limenes, Crete, killing four passengers and leaving 30 others missing.

=== March ===
- 2 March – The government orders the deployment of two frigates and two F-16 fighter jets to Cyprus in response to Iranian drone strikes on the island amid the 2026 Iran war.
- 8 March – A magnitude 5.3 earthquake hits Epirus, damaging around 140 houses.
- 16 March – A Frontex patrol boat carrying the Estonian ambassador capsizes off Kastellorizo, injuring four people.

=== April ===
- 3 April – Prime minister Mitsotakis conducts a cabinet reshuffle amid criticism over the improper use of agrarian subsidies from the EU by MPs, resulting in the removal of Agriculture Minister Kostas Tsiaras, Civil Protection Minister Yiannis Kefalogiannis, and Deputy Health Minister Dimitris Vartzopoulos.
- 8 April – The government announces a ban on people under 15 years old from accessing social media effective in 2027.
- 28 April – Four people are injured in separate shootings carried out by the same gunman in Athens.

=== May ===
- 7 May – A Ukrainian naval drone is discovered off Lefkada.
- 16 May – Greece's Akylas finishes 10th at Eurovision 2026 in Austria with the single "Ferto".
- 21 May – Alexandros Giotopoulos, the head of the far-left militant group Revolutionary Organization 17 November, is released on parole after 23 years in prison.

=== July ===
- 1 July – A firebombing on the homes of New Democracy party members in Thessaloniki kills one person and injures three others.
- 9 July – A General Dynamics F-16 Fighting Falcon of the Hellenic Air Force crash-lands and catches fire at Zakynthos International Airport. The pilot is rescued.
- 26 July – Mount Olympus is designated as a UNESCO World Heritage Site.
- 30 July – 2026 Greece wildfires: Thousands of people are evacuated on Crete.

=== August ===
- 2 August – 2026 Greece wildfires: Following takeoff from Elefsina Air Base, two Bell helicopters crash in Psatha resulting in one survivor, two deaths, and two injuries.
- 16 August – 2026 Greece wildfires: Two people are killed in a wildfire in Salamis Island.
- 17 August – A British couple on their honeymoon and their Greek pilot are killed in a helicopter crash on the island of Sifnos.
- 31 August – Greece and Israel sign a €3 billion weapons agreement.

=== September ===
- 5 September – An F-4 Phantom II of the Hellenic Air Force crashes during an aerial show in Tanagra Air Base, killing the two pilots.
- 15 September – Neo-Nazi politician Ilias Kasidiaris is released from prison.
- 25 September
  - Six people are killed when a three-story building collapses after an explosion in Plaka, Athens.
  - A cargo vessel catches fire off Mykonos, forcing the evacuation of all 29 people on board.

=== October ===
- 3 October – Greece repatriates the remains of Samuel of Bulgaria, which were previously stored at the Museum of Byzantine Culture in Thessaloniki, to Sofia.
- 7 October – The US and Greece agree on a coordinated security framework for counterterrorism information sharing among respective law enforcement agencies.
- 9 October – Two men are seriously injured after an explosion at an oil refinery in Agioi Theodoroi.
- 13 October – Israel returns 22 artifacts recovered from the illegal antiquities trade to Greece.
- 18 October – A light aircraft crashes into a dry riverbed in Pieria, killing two people.
- 19 October – Two separate boat accidents off the islands of Lesbos and Samos kill 12 migrants.
- 21 October
  - An explosion at a building injures four people in Athens.
  - The US sanctions a Panama- and Greece-based law firm, stating that it facilitated Iran’s shadow fleet for years and indirectly supported the Iranian regime's capacity to produce income to fund its nuclear program.

=== November ===
- 3 November – The Panama-flagged cruise ship Crown Iris is subjected to a hoax bomb threat while docked in Syros on its way to Israel, prompting the evacuation of 1,537 passengers and crew.
- 5 November – Two Aegean Airlines flights are searched before takeoff from Athens and Thessaloniki respectively after being subjected to bomb threats that are subsequently found to be false.
- 7–9 November – Twenty migrants are found dead while trying to reach Crete, some 15 nautical miles south-southwest of Kaloi Limenes.

== Holidays ==
- 1 January – New Year's Day
- 6 January – Epiphany
- 23 February – Clean Monday
- 25 March – Greek Independence Day
- 10 April – Orthodox Good Friday
- 12 April – Orthodox Easter Sunday
- 13 April – Orthodox Easter Monday
- 1 May – Labour Day
- 31 May – Orthodox Whit Sunday
- 1 June – Orthodox Whit Monday
- 15 August – Assumption Day
- 28 October – Greek National Anniversary Day
- 25 December – Christmas Day
- 26 December – Synaxis of the Mother of God

== Deaths ==
- 4 January – Giorgos Papadakis, 74, journalist and television presenter.
- 15 January – Princess Irene of Greece and Denmark, 83, South African-born Greek-Spanish royal.
- 15 February – Anna Benaki-Psarouda, 91, President of the Hellenic Parliament (2004–2007), minister of justice (1992–1993) and culture (1989, 1991–1992).
- 28 March – Marinella, 87, singer.
- 25 May – Paraskevas Antzas, 49, footballer (Skoda Xanthi, Olympiacos, national team).
- 1 June – Marios Oikonomou, 33, footballer (Bologna, AEK Athens, national team).
- 18 June – Theoliptos Fenerlis, 69, Turkish-Greek Orthodox prelate, metropolitan of Iconium (since 2000).
- 2 June – Eleni Zetou, 70, volleyball player (Aris Thessaloniki, national team).
- 8 July – Paola Revenioti, 68, LGBTQ activist.
- 9 September – Giorgos Mazonakis, 54, singer.
- 18 September – Margaret Chant-Papandreou, 102, American-born women's rights activist and writer.

== See also ==
- 2026 in the European Union
- 2026 in Europe
