= 2023 in Greece =

- Decades: 2000s; 2010s; 2020s
- See also: Other events of 2023; List of years in Greece

Events in the year 2023 in Greece.

== Incumbents ==
- President: Katerina Sakellaropoulou
- Prime Minister: Kyriakos Mitsotakis

== Events ==
- 5 January – Aegean dispute: A Turkish coast guard vessel exchanges warning shots with a Greek coast guard vessel off the Greek island of Farmakonisi.
- 10 January – Constantine II, dies at age 82. He was the last Greek monarch, reigning from 1964 to 1973.
- 27 January – Greek wiretapping scandal of 2022: Greek prime minister Kyriakos Mitsotakis survives a no-confidence vote called by former prime minister Alexis Tsipras over the scandal.
- 8 February – The Greek Parliament votes to ban National Party – Greeks from running in the coming elections. The New Democracy (Greece), PASOK voted for it, while the Communist Party of Greece, Greek Solution and MeRA25 voted against.
- 28 February – Tempi train crash: A passenger train and a freight train collide in Tempi, Larissa, Thessaly, killing 57 people and injuring more than 85 others.
- 1 March – Two people are killed after a boat carrying around 30 migrants capsizes near the coast of Kos.
- 21 May – May 2023 Greek legislative election.
- 12 June – Killing of Anastasia-Patricia Rubinska on the Greek island of Kos.
- 14 June – At least 59 people die and 100 more are rescued after a boat carrying migrants capsizes off the coast of the Peloponnese. The government declares a three-day mourning period.
- 15 June - Protest across the country following the sinking of a boat carrying migrants and refugees. The boat is estimated to have been ferrying 750 people. More than 100 were rescued, and 78 bodies recovered.
- 19 June – Nine Egyptian men arraigned in court in connection to the boat disaster. They all pleaded not guilty.
- 25 June – June 2023 Greek legislative election: Nea Demokratia wins another term in office following May's fruitless election. Spartans, Course of Freedom and Niki enter the Parliament for the first time.
- 25 July – 2023 Greece wildfires: Two HAF servicemen are killed when a Canadair CL-215 waterbomber crashes on Evia island.
- 5 September – The city of Volos suffers extended damage due to floods caused by heavy raining.
- 6 September – At least 10 people have been killed by floods caused by torrential rain in Bulgaria, Turkey, and Greece.
- 7 September – Due to ongoing flooding, the main highway in Greece between Athens and Thessaloniki is closed and there is no train traffic between the two major cities.
- 26 November – The cargo ship Raptor sinks off the Greek island of Lesbos with 14 crew members on board. The coast guard rescues one person and recovers the body of one of the other crew members.
- 28 December – Greek-owned cargo ship Vyssos travelling to Ukraine hits a Russian naval mine in the Black Sea, injuring three crew members.

== Sports ==
- 20 June – 2 July – 2023 Men's Junior World Handball Championship
- 19 August 2022 – 14 May 2023: 2022–23 Super League Greece
- 2 – 9 September – 2023 Mediterranean Beach Games

== Deaths ==
- 1 January – Apostolos Pitsos, 104, industrialist and businessman.
- 3 January –
  - Nikos Skylakakis, 99, basketball player (national team).
  - Notis Mavroudis, 77, guitarist and composer
- 10 January –
  - Irenaios, 83, Orthodox prelate, patriarch of the Greek Orthodox Church of Jerusalem (2001–2005).
  - Constantine II, 82, last king of the Hellenes (r. 1964–1973).
- 17 January – Paul Soulikias, 96, Greek-Canadian painter.
- 20 January – Elena Apergi, 90, actress (Madalena, Ena Exypno Exypno Moutro).
- 21 January – Erricos Andreou, 84, film director (The Hook, Act of Reprisal) and screenwriter.
- 22 January – Nikos Xanthopoulos, 88, actor and singer.
- 24 January – Metropolitan Panteleimon of Belgium, 87, Orthodox prelate, metropolitan of Belgium (1982–2013).
- 2 February – John Zizioulas, 92, Orthodox prelate, metropolitan of Pergamon (since 1986).
- 8 February – Manousos Voloudakis, 56, politician, MP (2007–2009, 2012–2014, since 2019).
- 9 February – Sasa Zivoulovic, 50, Olympic handball player (2004).
- 13 February – Nektarios Santorinios, 50, politician, MP (since 2015).
- 16 February –
  - Despoina Nikolaidou, 88–89, actress (A Matter of Dignity, And the Wife Shall Revere Her Husband, Agonia).
  - Stratis Stratigis, 89, lawyer and politician, MP (1985–1989).
- 17 February – Moses Elisaf, 68, politician, mayor of Ioannina (since 2019).
- 20 February – George B. Dertilis, 84, historian.
- 22 February – Giorgos Katsoulis, 60, water polo player (Olympiacos) and coach.
