= 2027 in Greece =

- Decades: 2000s; 2010s; 2020s
- See also: Other events of 2027; List of years in Greece

Events in the year 2027 in Greece.

== Events ==
=== Predicted or scheduled ===
- By 25 July – Next Greek parliamentary election
- 2 August – Solar eclipse of August 2, 2027 (partial eclipse)

== Holidays ==
- 1 January – New Year's Day
- 6 January – Epiphany
- 23 February – Clean Monday
- 25 March – Greek Independence Day
- 30 April – Orthodox Good Friday
- 2 May – Orthodox Easter Sunday
- 3 May – Orthodox Easter Monday
- 4 May – Labour Day
- 31 May – Orthodox Whit Sunday
- 1 June – Orthodox Whit Monday
- 15 August – Assumption Day
- 28 October – Greek National Anniversary Day
- 25 December – Christmas Day
- 26 December – Synaxis of the Mother of God
