= Deligiorgis =

Deligiorgis, Deligeorgis, (Greek: Δεληγεώργης, pronounced [ðeliʝiˈorʝis]) is a Greek surname. Notable people with the surname include:

- Dimitrios Deligeorgis, Greek revolutionary and politician
- Epameinondas Deligeorgis, Greek lawyer, newspaper reporter, and politician
- Nikolaos Deligiorgis, Greek magazine editor and publisher
