= Kostopoulos =

Kostopoulos (Greek: Κωστόπουλος) is a surname meaning "son of Kostas". The feminine form is Kostopoulou (Κωστοπούλου). Notable people with the surname include:

- Charis Kostopoulos (born 1964), Greek singer, songwriter, poet, composer
- Evan Kostopoulos (born 1990), Australian footballer
- Stavros Kostopoulos (1900–1968), Greek banker and politician
- Tom Kostopoulos (born 1979), Canadian professional ice hockey player
