= Forokarta =

The Forokarta (φοροκάρτα) was a "tax card" first proposed by the government of Greece in August 2011, which would be used to facilitate collection of receipts for purchases; this would allow the Greek finance ministry to clamp down on rampant tax evasion by comparing individuals' spending to their income and by comparing business' actual revenues to their accounts.

The card physically resembled a credit card. It did not display a name; it had a unique 10-digit ID number. The card was officially introduced on 3 October 2011.

The introduction of the card went hand in hand with other changes to the tax system. Because the card was used to track payments made by the holder but did not carry personally identifying information and did not entitle the holder to anything, theft or loss was not a major concern.

The project was abandoned due to various factors, primarily the widespread use of cash in transactions (reaching 90%) and the lack of compensatory benefits that would promote its use (in relation to the collection of receipts). The recording system was terminated on December 31, 2017, on the one hand because the last AADE circular that mentioned its use concerned the income tax return for the year 2017, and on the other hand because AADE itself does not provide data on its use beyond that date.

== See also ==
- Tax evasion and corruption in Greece
