= Ziagas =

Ziagas (Greek: Ζιάγκας) is a Greek surname. Notable people with the surname include:

- Yannis Ziagas (1940–2025), Greek politician
- Zisis Ziagas (born 1972), Greek footballer
