= MotoMarine Panther 57 patrol boat =

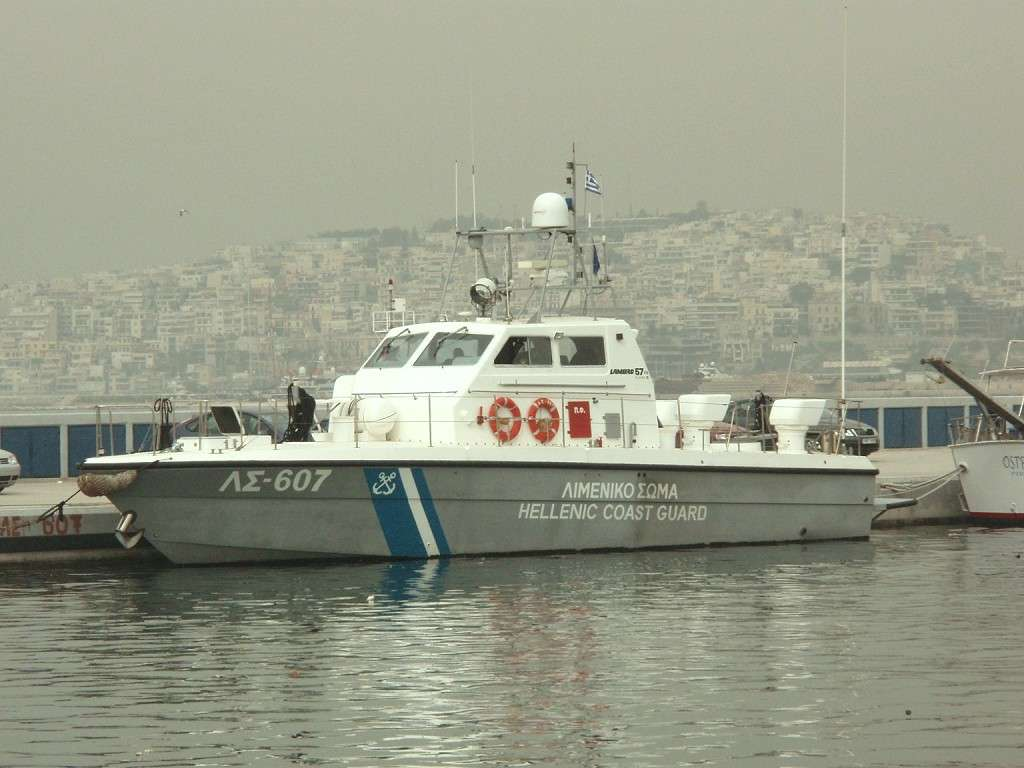

Class overview
- Builders: Motomarine (Greece)

General characteristics
- Class & type: Panther 57 MK.I Fast Patrol Boat
- Displacement: 28 long tons (28 t)
- Length: 18.2 m (59 ft 9 in) o/a
- Beam: 4.68 m (15 ft 4 in)
- Draught: 0.92 m (3 ft 0 in)
- Propulsion: 2 × MAN V12 engines, fixed pitch propellers, 3,900 litres (860 imp gal; 1,000 US gal) fuel
- Speed: 44 knots (81 km/h; 51 mph)
- Range: 250 nmi (460 km; 290 mi)
- Armament: M2 Browning machine gun

The Panther 57 Fast Patrol Boat is an evolution of the Lambro 57 coastal patrol boat, built by MotoMarine, a Greek company formerly known as Lambro boats. The Mark I model has a displacement of 28 long tons (28 t), an overall length of 18.2 m (59 ft 9 in), and a maximum speed of 44 knots (81 km/h; 51 mph), and is armed with a M2 Browning machine gun.

This particular model, and its predecessors, have been among the key types employed by the Hellenic Coast Guard.
