= 2025 in Greece =

- Decades: 2000s; 2010s; 2020s
- See also: Other events of 2025; List of years in Greece

Events in the year 2025 in Greece.

== Incumbents ==
- President: Katerina Sakellaropoulou (until 13 March); Konstantinos Tasoulas (since 13 March)
- Prime Minister: Kyriakos Mitsotakis

== Events ==
=== January ===
- 25 January – 2025 Greek presidential election (first round): No candidate wins a majority in the Hellenic Parliament.
- 28 January – A Turkish national is arrested after the Hellenic Coast Guard recovers 61 firearms and nearly 3,000 rounds of ammunition from a boat off the coast of Alexandroupoli.
- 31 January – 2025 Greek presidential election (second round): No candidate wins a majority in the Hellenic Parliament.

=== February ===
- 3 February – A closure of schools and restrictions of large public gatherings is implemented in Santorini due to an earthquake swarm. School closures are also declared in the nearby islands of Amorgos, Anafi and Ios.
- 6 February –
  - 2025 Greek presidential election (third round): No candidate wins a majority in the Hellenic Parliament.
  - Christos Triantopoulos resigns as deputy minister for civil protection following allegations that he had tampered with evidence related to the Tempi train crash in 2023.
  - A state of emergency is declared in Santorini due to the ongoing earthquake swarm.
- 12 February – 2025 Greek presidential election (fourth and final round): Former parliament speaker Konstantinos Tasoulas is elected President of Greece after winning 160 of 300 votes in the Hellenic Parliament.

=== March ===
- 10 March – Niki MP Nikolaos Papadopoulos and a companion are arrested for vandalizing an exhibition at the National Gallery in Athens that they claim as offensive to Eastern Orthodoxy.
- 13 March – Konstantinos Tasoulas is inaugurated as president.
- 14 March – Prime Minister Mitsotakis implements a cabinet reshuffle, resulting in the appointment of Makis Voridis as migration minister and the transfer of digital governance minister Kyriakos Pierrakakis to the finance ministry.
- 15 March – Moody's raises the country's credit status to Baa3, making it the last major ratings agency to lift junk status on Greek government bonds that began during the Greek government-debt crisis in 2010.
- 18 March – Roula Pispirigou receives two additional life sentences for murdering her daughters as part of the Patras sisters death case.
- 31 March – A closure of schools and non-essential traffic is declared in Paros and Mykonos due to floods caused by heavy rain.

=== April ===
- 3 April – A boat carrying migrants sinks off the coast of Lesbos, killing seven passengers.
- 9 April – A general strike causes nationwide disruptions to transportation.
- 11 April – A bomb is detonated outside the offices of Hellenic Train in Athens. No casualties are reported, while the group Revolutionary Class Struggle claims responsibility.
- 12 April – Riots break out in the Exarchia neighbourhood of Athens, resulting in 72 arrests and injuries to one police officer.
- 14 April – A boat carrying migrants sinks off the coast of Farmakonisi, killing two passengers.
- 23 April – At least 34 ancient artefacts are recovered in a sting operation in Crete that leads to the arrest of six suspected smugglers.

=== May ===
- 3 May – One person is killed in the self-detonation of a bomb being planted by the victim in Thessaloniki.
- 14 May – A magnitude 6.0 earthquake hits off the coast of Kasos, prompting a tsunami warning that passes without incident.
- 17 May – Greece finishes in sixth place at Eurovision 2025 in Switzerland.
- 18 May – An earthquake swarm hits Euboea, damaging more than 50 structures.
- 22 May – A magnitude 6.2 earthquake hits Crete, causing extensive damage in the Heraklion area.
- 23 May – A monk is injured in clashes between rival Eastern Orthodox factions at the Esphigmenou Monastery in Mount Athos.
- 24 May – An undersea electricity cable connecting Crete to mainland Greece is completed as part of the Great Sea Interconnector project.
- 28 May – A group of National Intelligence Service officers are fired upon during a surveillance operation at a gas station in Thessaloniki. Five Turkish suspects are arrested.

=== June ===
- 3 June – Ten officials from the Hellenic Fire Service and other civil protection agencies are convicted of negligence over the 2018 Attica wildfires. Four of them are sentenced to five years' imprisonment the next day.
- 5 June – A strike is held in Paros by restaurant owners in protest over zoning restrictions against them using the island's harbour beachfront.
- 7 June –
  - A magnitude 5.3 earthquake hits Mount Athos, causing extensive damage to several religious structures.
  - The bodies of 14 people believed to have been killed during the Greek Civil War are discovered buried underneath a park near Thessaloniki.
- 10 June – The Hellenic Parliament expels far-right Spartans party leader Vasilis Stigkas and two other Spartans MPs after being convicted of proxying for a convicted member of the Golden Dawn party.
- 18–29 June – EuroBasket Women 2025 in Czech Republic, Germany, Greece and Italy.
- 22 June –
  - A wildfire breaks out in Chios, prompting the evacuation of 20 villages and a reception center for Turkish migrants. The government declares a state of emergency on the island.
  - An Azerbaijani national is arrested on suspicion of spying on the Crete Naval Base.
- 25 June – Wildfires break out in Attica, prompting the evacuation of more than 1,000 people.
- 27 June – Migration and Asylum Minister Makis Voridis resigns along with four deputy ministers and officials amid allegations of mismanagement of EU subsidies for agriculture between 2019 and 2022 by the managing agency OPEKEPE. He is succeeded the next day by Thanos Plevris.

=== July ===
- 4 July – UC Berkeley Professor Przemyslaw Jeziorski is murdered by his ex-wife in the Agia Paraskevi district near Athens.
- 7 July – The Ministry of Labour and Social Security imposes a mandatory work stoppage from midday to 17:00 affecting outdoor manual labor and food delivery services in parts of the country due to an ongoing heatwave.
- 9 July – The government suspends asylum applications for migrants arriving on Crete following an increase in arrivals from Libya.
- 12 July – Six Minoan palaces (Knossos, Phaistos, Malia, Zakros, Zominthos and Kydonia) are designated as World Heritage Sites by UNESCO.
- 21 July – Prime Minister Mitsotakis announces the creation of two protected marine areas in the Ionian Sea and the southern Cyclades.
- 22 July –
  - Fugitive Moldovan oligarch and former MP Vladimir Plahotniuc, who is wanted in his home country for money laundering and involvement in the theft of $1 billion from the state budget and banking system, is arrested in Greece. He is extradited to Moldova on 25 September.
  - A firefighting helicopter crashes into the sea near Athens during efforts to extinguish a wildfire. All three people on board are rescued.
- 26 July – A bomb attack is carried out on the residence of Konstantinos Varsamis, the president of the Greek association of prison guards, in Sykies, injuring two people.

=== August ===
- 8 August – One person is killed in a wildfire in Keratea.
- 10 August – Police announce the seizure of 271.15 kilograms of cocaine valued at over 5.5 million euros ($6.5 million) and believed to have originated from Ecuador following two related operations in Thessaloniki and Aspropyrgos, resulting in three arrests.
- 11 August – The government orders migrants with rejected asylum claims to wear ankle monitors as part of efforts to increase the rate of deportations.

=== September ===
- 3 September – Parliament passes a law barring asylum to undocumented migrants who had entered the country through third countries deemed safe by the European Union.
- 12 September – A judicial council allows Golden Dawn leader Nikolaos Michaloliakos to serve his sentence at his residence on grounds of ill-health.
- 14 September – Greece finishes in third place at EuroBasket 2025 after defeating Finland 92-89 at the final in Latvia.
- 24 September – The Global Sumud Flotilla reports explosions by "unidentified objects" off the coast of Crete on its way to the Gaza Strip, prompting the Italian Navy to deploy one of its vessels to assist the convoy.
- 27 September – The Mount Parnon–Cape Maleas complex is designated as a biosphere reserve by UNESCO.

=== October ===
- 1 October – Thousands of people march in Athens as part of a nationwide general strike to protest against proposed labor law changes that would result in a 48-hour workweek or 13-hour shifts.
- 3 October – The first known wolfdog in Greece is discovered near Thessaloniki.
- 7 October – A boat carrying migrants sinks off Lesbos, killing four passengers.
- 8 October – A Tecnam P2002 JF of the Hellenic Air Force crashes at Tatoi Airport, injuring the two pilots on board.
- 14 October –
  - A second nationwide general strike is held in protest against proposed labor law changes.
  - A speedboat carrying migrants capsizes as it is being pursued by the Hellenic Coast Guard off the coast of Rhodes, killing two passengers.
- 16 October – Parliament passes the proposed labor law changes.

=== November ===
- 1 November – Two people are killed in a shooting blamed on a family dispute in Vorizia, Crete.
- 12 November –
  - Three migrants drown when a wooden boat capsizes off Gavdos; 55 people are rescued, while at least 42 go missing.
  - Twenty-nine migrants are arrested following clashes at a migrant detention center in Sintiki.
- 13 November – Four yachts sink following a fire at a marina at the Bay of Zea near Piraeus.
- 30 November – A tractor blockade is carried out by farmers protesting against the delayed payment of European Union subsidies along a section of the Athens-Thessaloniki highway near Larissa, resulting in three arrests.

=== December ===
- 7 December – The bodies of 17 migrants are found in a partially deflated boat off the coast of Ierapetra in Crete. Two survivors are rescued.
- 8 December – A runway incursion is carried out by farmers protesting against the delayed payment of EU subsidies at Heraklion International Airport "Nikos Kazantzakis", resulting in disruptions to aviation, while two people are injured in related clashes near Chania International Airport.
- 10 December – A blockade is carried out by farmers protesting against the delayed payment of EU subsidies at the port of Volos.
- 11 December – Finance minister Kyriakos Pierrakakis is elected president of the Eurogroup.
- 19 December – The Hellenic Coast Guard rescues 545 migrants from a vessel in distress off the coast of Gavdos.
- 26 December – Four hikers are found dead following an avalanche in Vardousia, Phocis.

== Holidays ==
- 1 January – New Year's Day
- 6 January – Epiphany
- 3 March – Clean Monday
- 25 March – Greek Independence Day
- 18 April – Orthodox Good Friday
- 20 April – Orthodox Easter Sunday
- 21 April – Orthodox Easter Monday
- 1 May – Labour Day
- 8 June – Orthodox Whit Sunday
- 9 June – Orthodox Whit Monday
- 15 August – Assumption Day
- 28 October – Greek National Anniversary Day
- 25 December – Christmas Day
- 26 December – Glorifying Mother of God

== Deaths ==
=== January ===
- 5 January – Costas Simitis, 88, Prime Minister of Greece (1996-2004).
- 6 January – Stella Greka, 102, singer and actress.
- 19 January – Kaiti Grey, 100, singer.
- 24 January – Mimis Domazos, 83, footballer (Panathinaikos, AEK Athens, national team).
- 25 January – Anastasios of Albania, 95, Greek-Albanian Orthodox prelate, archbishop of Tirana and All Albania (since 1992).
- 26 January – Yannis Ziagas, 84, politician, MEP (1982–1984), MP (1985–1993, 1996–2000).

=== February ===
- 1 February – Ilias Kostopanagiotou, 81, politician, MP (2015–2019).
- 10 February – Takis Ikonomopoulos, 81, footballer (Panathinaikos, Apollon Athens, national team).

=== July ===
- 19 July – Lena Pappa, 93, poet.

=== August ===
- 7 August – Dionysios Mantalos, 72, Greek Orthodox prelate, metropolitan bishop of Corinth (since 2006).
- 21 August – Apostolos Vesyropoulos, 59, MP (since 2012).

=== October ===
- 21 October – Dionysios Savvopoulos, 80, singer-songwriter.

== See also ==
- 2025 in the European Union
- 2025 in Europe
