= Motomarine (Greece) =

Motomarine S.A.
- Type: Private
- Industry: Shipbuilding, Defence
- Founded: 1962; 64 years ago
- Headquarters: Koropi, East Attica, Attica, Greece
- Products: Fast Attack Craft, Patrol Boats, pleasure boat
- Website: www.motomarine.gr

Motomarine S.A. was a Greek shipbuilding company located in Koropi, Greece. It was founded in 1962 (originally as Lambro Boats by Aristotelis Zeis), and its range included pleasure boats, as well as modern coastal patrol vessels. Motomarine had been for many years the main supplier of the Greek Coast Guard, while exporting its products to a number of countries around the world. The company ceased operations in 2016; its facilities and designs were acquired by Riginos Yachts, a Glyfada-based yacht company, which manufactures pleasure yachts under the Onda brand name (after one of Lambro/MotoMarine earlier models).

== External links / References ==
- Motomarine data
- L.S. Skartsis, "Modern Greece's Machines: A Comprehensive Guide to Greek Vehicle & Machine Manufacturers (1700 to Present)" (2026) ISBN 978-618-00-6734-7 (eBook)

Citations
