= Killing of Anastazja Patrycja Rubińska =

Killing of a Polish hotel worker on the Greek island of Kos

Killing of Anastazja Patrycja Rubinńska
- Native name: Anastazja Patrycja Rubińska
- Date: 12 June 2023
- Location: Kos (island), Greece; 36°53′41.22″N 27°17′17.7″E
- Target: Anastazja Patrycja Rubińska
- Perpetrator: Salahuddin S
- Outcome: Ongoing investigation
- Suspects: 1
- Charges: Kidnapping and manslaughter with intent

The killing of Anastazja Patrycja Rubińska involved the death of a 27-year-old female hotel worker from Poland, whose body was discovered naked and wrapped in a plastic bag on the Greek island of Kos. Rubińska had been reported missing since 12 June 2023, until her remains were found on 18 June 2023, in a salt marsh near the residence of the suspect. Rubińska's disappearance was reported to authorities by her partner, who received a phone call from her stating that she was in Marmari, had consumed too much alcohol, and someone would bring her to the hotel on a motorcycle after which she went missing. Salahuddin S, a Bangladeshi man, was charged with kidnapping, raping and murdering her. He pleaded not guilty but was charged with kidnapping and murder. The incident attracted significant attention both locally and internationally.

== Details ==
Anastazja Patrycja Rubińska was a 27-year-old Polish woman from Wrocław who worked in a five-star hotel in the tourist town of Marmari with her Polish boyfriend. She went missing on 12 June 2023.

Surveillance footage revealed that the last person seen with her was a 32-year-old Bangladeshi man named Salahuddin S. Rubińska's body was discovered 1 kilometre from the suspect's residence. Proto Thema reported that Rubinska's DNA and hair had been found in the suspect's room. Moreover, the man had scratch marks on his face and hands, and signs of a struggle on his hands. According to the autopsy report, she was strangled, with additional reports citing police sources indicating that she was subjected to torture before her death.

On 6 December 2024, a court found Salahuddin S. guilty of kidnapping and "manslaughter with intent." He was sentenced to life in prison.

== Reactions ==
Prime Minister of Poland Mateusz Morawiecki suggested that the suspected killer should be extradited to Poland and be tried there.
