= Sonia Ilinskagia =

Greek-Russian writer (1938–2024)

- Born: 1938; Moscow, Soviet Union
- Died: 19 January 2024 (aged 86); Athens, Greece
- Occupations: writer, translator, professor

Sonia Ilinskagia (Greek: Σόνια Ιλίνσκαγια; 1938 – 19 January 2024) was a Greek-Russian writer, translator and professor. She was considered one of the most important scholars of modern Greek literature.

== Biography ==
Ilinskagia was born in Moscow and studied classical literature at Lomonosov Moscow University specializing in modern Greek and Russian literature. She worked as a researcher at the Institute of Slavic and Balkan Studies of the USSR Academy of Sciences. In 1971 she defended her thesis entitled "Contribution to the study of post-war poetry in Greece".

In 1983 she settled in Greece where she became professor of modern Greek philology. Ilinskagia was an Honorary Professor of the University of Ioannina. Her most emblematic achievement of this period was the publication of the entire poetic work of Cavafy in Russian in 2009, based on the Greek edition of 2003. Ilinskagia was honoured by the Greek State with the Orders of Commander of the Orders of Honor (2007) and Phoenix (2018).

She was married to writer Mitsos Alexandropoulos. Ilinskagia died in January 2024.
