= Przemyslaw Jeziorski =

Polish-American marketing professor (1982–2025)

- Born: Przemyslaw Jeziorski; 24 April 1982; Poland
- Died: 4 July 2025 (aged 43); Agia Paraskevi, Greece
- Occupation: Professor of Marketing
- Employer: University of California, Berkeley
- Known for: Marketing research, faculty at Haas School of Business

Przemyslaw Jeziorski (24 April 1982 – 4 July 2025) was a Polish‑American marketing academic and associate professor at the Haas School of Business, University of California, Berkeley.

On 4 July 2025, Jeziorski was shot five times by a masked gunman while in Agia Paraskevi, Greece. On 16 July 2025, five people were arrested in connection to the killing including his ex-wife and her current boyfriend.

On 4 June 2026, Jeziorski's ex-wife Nadia Michelidaki, who was on remand awaiting trial for his murder, took her own life in prison.
