= Theophilos Kamberidis =

Greek politician (1930–2022)

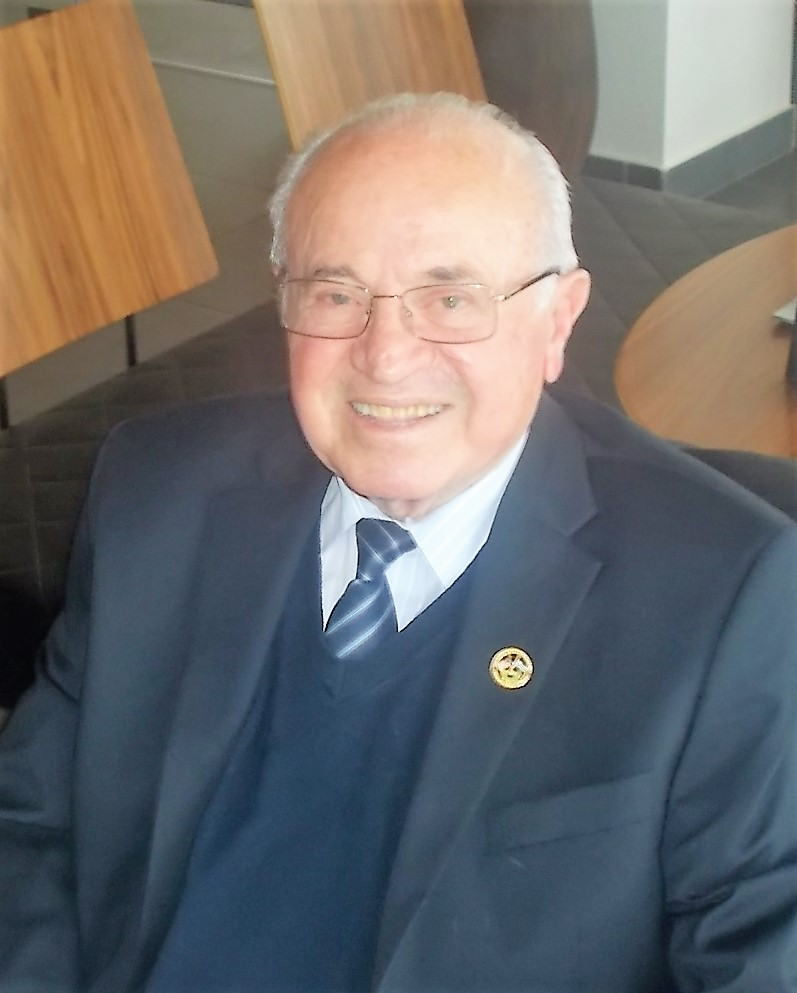

Theophilos Kamberidis (Greek: Θεόφιλος Καμπερίδης; 2 April 1930 – 13 September 2022) was a Greek politician who served as a Member of Parliament in Pieria from 1964 to 1967 and Mayor of Katerini from 1 January 1987 to 31 December 1990. His childhood was spent at the village of Aronas and he was moved to Katerini at a very early age. He took up athletics and won medals. He finished his economic studies in Thessaloniki and then came into politics, with George Papandreou. He was elected as an MP in district of Pieria with Centre Union in 1964 and denounced the attempt to get bribes in return for leaving his party. After the start of the military regime of 1967, he fled Greece to Boston, US, where he organised the struggle against the military regime in his country. After returning to Greece, he was elected mayor of Katerini in 1986.

== Biography ==
=== Early years and Resistance ===
Born in Katerini, Kamberidis was brought up at Aronas, where he finished Primary School. He was active in the Resistance against Nazi Germany in Pieria during the 1942–1945 period, as the leader of "aetopoula" squad (eaglets). Due to his young age, which meant that he was not a suspect for the Nazis, he carried letters and golden coins (liras) for supplying the fighters on the mountains. He fought with EPON rebel group in 1944 and 1945 against Nazis and their supporters.

In 1946 following the evacuation of several areas, he moved to Katerini from Aronas, along with his family. There he finished his Secondary Education in 1951. During his high school years, he developed voluntary action within sports, scouting, Christian and cultural groups. While he was a student, he organized Red Cross groups and until the age of 28 he was involved in sports.

=== Studies ===
Kamberidis graduated in 1952 from the School of Accountants and in the same year was admitted to the School of Economics and Political Sciences (OPE) of the University of Thessaloniki. In 1953 he served on Selection Army Board of Privates (SEO), together with Christos Sartzetakis.

=== Sport ===
Kamberidis was an athlete of G.S. Iraklis, champion in the 100 meter sprint and in the javelin. In 1959 he was elected president of the Board of Directors of Archelaos.

=== MP ===
In the 1964 legislative elections Kamberidis was elected the youngest MP of Pieria, with the Centre Union (to which he belonged since 1961 and was its youth president), gathering 8,183 votes. He served until 1967.

During the political crisis of 1965, he rejected a proposal to support the government of Stefanos Stefanopoulos in exchange for the sum of 5 million drachmas and a ministerial portfolio (Under Secretary for Trade), which he himself denounced to the Parliament together with the MP of Chania Yannis Valyrakis.

He returned to Greece after the restoration of democracy, in 1974.

=== Anti-dictatorship action and U.S. years ===
During the military dictatorship of 1967–1974, Kamberidis succeeded in fleeing to US, citing family and health reasons. With the help of Congressman Tip O'Neill and Senator Ted Kennedy he obtained permission to stay temporarily in the US by filing a special bill in the House of Representatives. He pioneered the establishment of ethno-local associations in Boston and organized many rallies on the Cyprus issue and Greece's relations with America. He had already been in contact with Andreas Papandreou in France in February 1968 and then in March in America. He organized the PAK in an area that included five American states. In 1982 he spearheaded the establishment of the New England Federation of Greek-American Associations (with activity within the diaspora on national issues), serving as its president for two years. After his return to Greece and his term as mayor in 1986, Theofilos Kamberidis returned to the US in 1991, together with his wife, Roula, and his three children, Maria, Charalambos and Vasilios, where they worked in privately owned family businesses.

=== Mayor ===
In 1959 Kamberidis was elected as the youngest municipal councillor.

After returning from the US, he was elected as Mayor of Katerini in 1986. He took office on 1 January 1987 and left office on 31 December 1990.

During his term as mayor, several projects were carried out, the most important of which were the completion of the Town Hall and the concentration of all municipal services, which had been scattered for a long time in unacceptable buildings, the expansion of the city plan and the utilization of the surrounding neighborhoods, with the accompanying economic development, the construction and operation of the biological purification of Katerini and the safety of many of its streets, the establishment and operation of the first municipal radio station in Greece (Municipal Radio of Katerini), the establishment and operation of the Centers for the Open Protection of Aging People (abbreviation: ΚΑΠΗ in Greek) and the completion of water supply and drainage studies.

In October 2012 Kamberidis was honored by Municipality of Katerini.

He died in Boston, on 13 September 2022, at the age of 92. He is survived by three children and his grandchildren. At the time of his death he was the last surviving member of Parliament who served with Centre Union political party.
