= Stratis Stratigis =

Greek lawyer and politician (1933–2023)

Member of the Hellenic Parliament
- In office 2 June 1985 – 2 June 1989
- Constituency: State

Personal details
- Born: 17 August 1933 Athens, Greece
- Died: 16 February 2023 (aged 89) Athens, Greece
- Party: ND
- Education: University of Basel; London School of Economics
- Occupation: Lawyer

Stratis Stratigis (Greek: Στράτης Στρατήγης; 17 August 1933 – 16 February 2023) was a Greek lawyer and politician. A member of New Democracy, he served in the Hellenic Parliament from 1985 to 1989.

Stratigis died in Athens on 16 February 2023, at the age of 89.
