= Metropolis of Iconium =

Christian episcopal see in West Asia

The Metropolis of Iconium (Greek: Μητρόπολις Ἰκονίου) is a metropolitan bishopric of the Ecumenical Patriarchate of Constantinople located at Iconium in Asia Minor, in the region of Lycaonia. It flourished through the Roman and Byzantine empires, and survived into the Ottoman Empire until the early 20th century and the Greco-Turkish population exchange, which led to the disappearance of the local Christian population.

The see continues to be occupied today as a titular see of the Ecumenical Patriarchate of Constantinople. The most recent incumbent was Theoliptos Fenerlis, from 2000 until 2026.

== History ==
Eastern Orthodox eparchies in Asia Minor (ca. 1880) including Iconium

Christianity came to Iconium very early. The apostles Paul came to Iconium escaping a disturbance and attempted stoning. It is presumed that Paul appointed bishops or presbyters during his visit.

From ca. 370, the see of Iconium became the metropolis of Lycaonia. The city fell to the Seljuk Turks in 1084, and became the capital of the Sultanate of Rum, except for a brief recapture by the First Crusade in 1097. In 1327 and 1365, the metropolitanate of Iconium was temporarily assumed by Caesarea, following its decline by the Anatolian Beyliks.

The fate of the see in the early Ottoman period is obscure: Metropolitan Amphilochius is mentioned as occupying the see until 1488, but it is unclear whether any bishop actually resided in the city, as this is not attested in the patriarchal ordinances (berat) of 1483 and 1525. The historian Elisabeth Zachariadou suggested that the seat of the metropolitan was moved at the time to Egridir, but this can not be verified. The see was definitely revived in the 17th century, as the patriarchal berat of 1625 once again refers to the city as the seat of a residential metropolitan. Iconium remained the seat of the metropolis until the 19th century, when it moved to Niğde, where the Greek Orthodox element was stronger. During the Ottoman period, the Metropolitan of Iconium also received the former metropolis of Tyana, whence his full title was "Metropolitan of Iconium and Tyana, hypertimos and exarch of all Lycaonia and Second Cappadocia".

== Known residential bishops ==
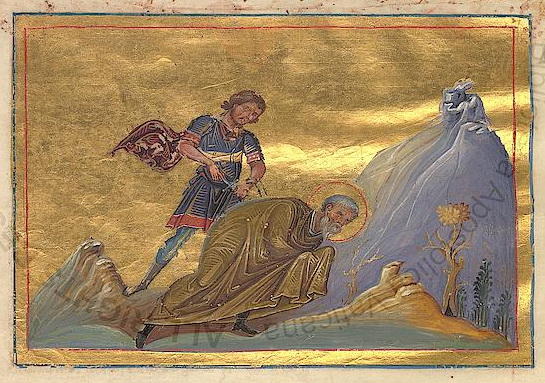
Coronatus, bishop of Iconium, from the Menologion of Basil II

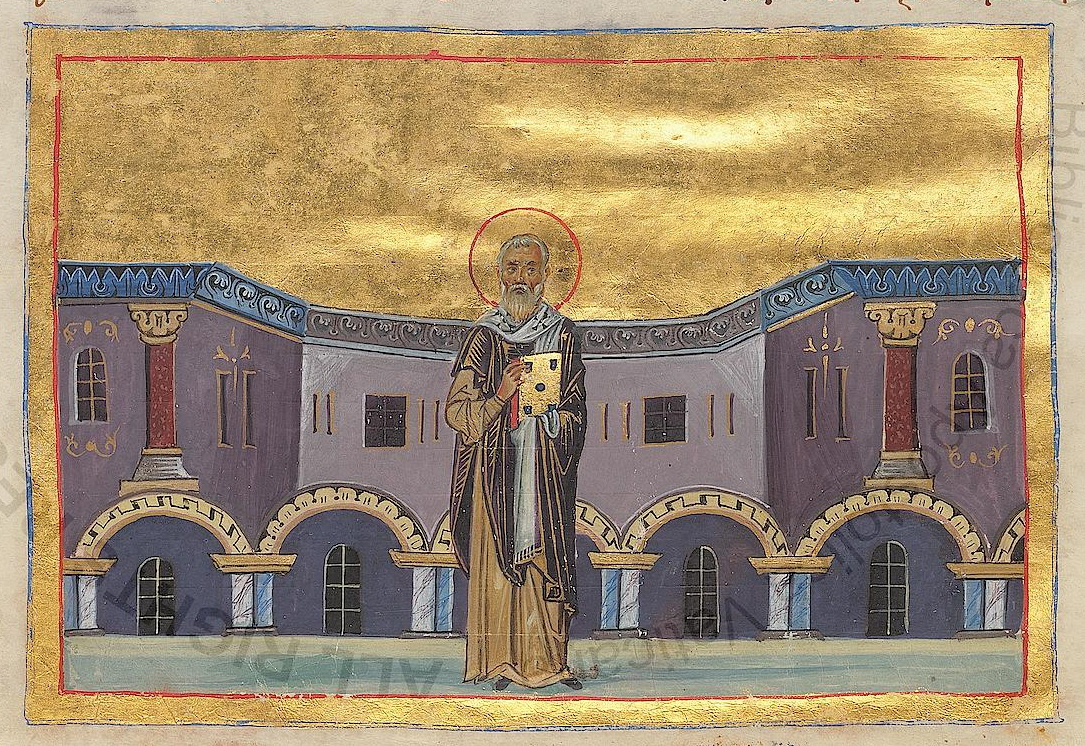
Saint Amphilochius bishop of Iconium.

The French historian Michel Le Quien names the following bishops:

- Cephas (1st century AD)
- Sosipater
- Terentus
- Caronatus (martyr) fl. 250
- Celsus
- Nicomas
- Peter
- Eulalius
- Fastinus fl. 372
- Amphilocius fl. 375
- Valerianus
- Onesiphorus, Bishop of Iconium.
- Amphilocius of Iconium, fl. 381
- Palladius
- Theodulus fl. 535
- Paul
- Elias
- Leo
- Theopylactus
- Theophilus
- Basil fl. 997
- John II fl. 1027
- unnamed bishop, attended a synod in Constantinople in 1077
- Eustathius fl. 1082
- Nicetas
- unnamed bishop, attended synod in Constantinople in 1152
- John III fl. 1160
- unnamed bishop fl. 1257
- Theodorus II
- Matthaeus (Catholic)
- Aphilochius (?–1488)
- Parthenius fl. 1638
- Clement (until 1667)
- Sylvester fl. 1721
- Cyril VI (1803–1810)
- Prokopios Lazaridis (1911-1923)

== Sources ==
- Charitopoulos, Evangelos (2005). "Ικονίου Μητρόπολις (Οθωμανική περίοδος)". Encyclopaedia of the Hellenic World, Asia Minor. Foundation of the Hellenic World.
- Foss, Clive (1991). "Ikonion". In Kazhdan, Alexander (ed.). The Oxford Dictionary of Byzantium. Oxford and New York: Oxford University Press. p. 985. ISBN 0-19-504652-8.
