= Theoliptos Fenerlis =

Greek theologian and Metropolitan at Ecumenical Patriarchate (1957–2026)

Theoliptos
- Metropolitan of Iconium, Hypertimos and Exarch of All Lycaonia
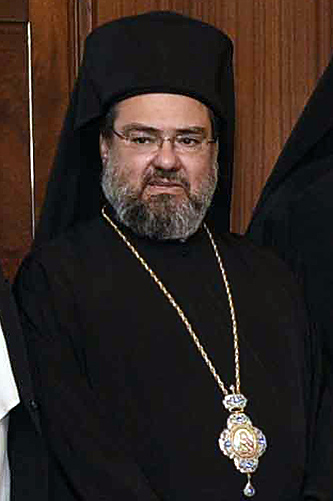
- Church: Ecumenical Patriarchate

Orders
- Consecration: 10 September 2000 – 18 June 2026 by Ecumenical Patriarch Bartholomew
- Rank: Grand Protosyncellus of the Holy Great Church of Christ (1997–2008)

Personal details
- Born: Iakovos (Jacob) Fenerlis; 17 April 1957 Tarabya, Turkey
- Died: 18 June 2026 (aged 69) Istanbul, Turkey
- Denomination: Orthodox Christian
- Education: Zographeion Lyceum; Aristotle University of Thessaloniki (BTh)

Theoliptos Fenerlis (His Eminence Theoliptos, Metropolitan of Iconium; Greek: Ο Σεβασμιώτατος Μητροπολίτης Ικονίου Θεόληπτος; Turkish: Konya Metropoliti, Theoliptos Fenerli (17 April 1957 – 18 June 2026), also known by his episcopal name Theoliptos of Iconium, was a Greek theologian and an Orthodox bishop of the Ecumenical Patriarchate of Constantinople from September 2000 until his death in June 2026.

== Early years and education ==
Theoliptos Fenerlis was born as Iakovos (Jacob) Fenerlis (Greek: Ιάκωβος Φενερλής, Iákovos Fenerlís) on 17 April 1957, in Tarabya, a suburb of Istanbul, Turkey. He was the eldest son of Georgios Fenerlis and Olga Vlachopoulou. Raised in a traditional Orthodox Christian household, Iakovos completed his primary education locally before attending the prestigious Zographeion Lyceum in Istanbul graduated in 1975.

In the same year, he moved to Thessaloniki, Greece to pursue higher education in theology. He enrolled in the Faculty of Theology at the Aristotle University of Thessaloniki, graduating with a bachelor's degree with distinction in 1979 as a scholarship recipient of the Ecumenical Patriarchate.

== Ordination and early ecclesiastical service ==
On 27 April 1977, Iakovos Fenerlis was ordained a deacon at the St. George's Patriarchal Cathedral, by his spiritual mentor, Metropolitan Bartholomew of Philadelphia (later Ecumenical Patriarch Bartholomew of Constantinople). Upon his ordination, he assumed the ecclesiastical name of 'Theoliptos'. Theoliptos began his service at the Ecumenical Patriarchate in various roles, initially as a Patriarchal Deacon. He progressed through the ranks, serving as Third Deacon, Second Deacon, and ultimately as Grand Archdeacon (Megas Archidiakonos) from 1995 to 1997. His duties included overseeing many of the administrative and liturgical functions within the Patriarchal court.

On 21 November 1997, he was ordained a presbyter by Ecumenical Patriarch Bartholomew, who also appointed him as Grand Archimandrite of the Ecumenical Throne. Theoliptos was further elevated to the role of Grand Protosyncellus (chief administrative officer) of the Ecumenical Patriarchate, a position he held until February 2008.

== Metropolitan of Iconium ==
On 4 September 2000, the Holy and Sacred Synod of the Ecumenical Patriarchate, elected Grand Archimandrite Theoliptos as Metropolitan of Iconium (Greek: Μητροπολίτης Ικονίου, Turkish: Konya Metropoliti (Başpiskopos)), with the additional titles of Hypertimos and Exarch of All Lycaonia. His election was made at the recommendation of Ecumenical Patriarch Bartholomew, who highly valued Theoliptos’ administrative skills and spiritual dedication. Theoliptos was consecrated as a bishop on 10 September 2000, at the St. George's Patriarchal Cathedral in the Fener. His consecration was officiated by Patriarch Bartholomew and was co-officiated by several metropolitans. Despite his elevation, he continued to serve as Grand Protosyncellus until 2008.

Throughout his ecclesiastical career, Metropolitan Theoliptos has been known as a close collaborator of Ecumenical Patriarch Bartholomew and has played an important role in the administration of the Ecumenical Patriarchate.

== Death ==
Fenerlis died from a cardiac arrest on 18 June 2026, at the age of 69.
