= Independent Authority for Public Revenue =

The Independent Authority of Public Revenue (Greek: Ανεξάρτητη Αρχή Δημοσίων Εσόδων, ΑΑΔΕ) is a Greek government agency that collects taxes in Greece. It was established on 1 January 2017, replacing the General Secretariat of Public Revenue of the Ministry of Finance. It is supervised by the Hellenic Parliament and not by the Ministry of Finance to which it is accountable. It is managed by a Governor and a five-member Council consisting of the President and four other members. There is also an Expert who has an advisory role. Since 2017, the governor of IARP is George Pitsilis.

The Customs Service, the General State Chemical Laboratory, the Public Financial Services, the Public Material Management Directorates fall under IARP.
