= Spiros Zournatzis =

Greek journalist and politician (1935–2022)

Member of the European Parliament
- In office 9 February 1989 – 24 July 1989
- Constituency: Greece

Personal details
- Born: 7 October 1935 Sofades, Greece
- Died: 12 September 2022 (aged 86)
- Party: EPEN
- Other political affiliations: European Right
- Education: National and Kapodistrian University of Athens
- Occupation: Journalist

Spiros Zournatzis (Greek: Σπύρος Ζουρνατζής; 7 October 1935 – 12 September 2022) was a Greek politician. A member of the National Political Union and the European Right, he served in the European Parliament from February to July 1989.

Zournatzis died on 12 September 2022, at the age of 86.
