= Elsa Papadimitriou =

Greek politician (1942–2022)

Member of the Hellenic Parliament
- In office 1993–2011

Personal details
- Born: 16 February 1942 Nafplio, Greece
- Died: 17 March 2022 (aged 80) Athens, Greece
- Party: New Democracy
- Education: National Technical University of Athens; University of California, Berkeley

Elsa Papadimitriou (Greek: Έλσα Παπαδημητρίου; 16 February 1942 – 17 March 2022) was a Greek politician. A member of the New Democracy party, she served in the Hellenic Parliament from 1993 to 2011. She died in Athens on 17 March 2022 at the age of 80.
