= Kostas Gousgounis =

Greek pornographic actor (1931–2022)

- Κώστας Γκουσγκούνης
- Born: Konstantinos Gousgounis; 21 March 1931; Larissa, Greece
- Died: 6 May 2022 (aged 91); Eleusis, Greece
- Occupations: Actor, pornographic actor

Konstantinos "Kostas" Gousgounis (Greek: Κωνσταντίνος (Κώστας) Γκουσγκούνης; 21 March 1931 – 6 May 2022) was a Greek pornographic actor. He was considered as a legendary figure of 1970s and 1980s Greek pornography.

He appeared in films such as O Idonoblepsias (The Peeping Tom), the award-winning Nikolas Triantafyllidis film Radio Moscow, The Overcoat (1996), and Mavro Gala (Black Milk, 2000). He also made a guest appearance in the popular Greek comedy series Tis Elados Ta Pedia (Greece's Boys). Gousgounis was the individual honoured at the 3rd Festival of Cult Greek Cinema, on 14 February 2005.

He was described as semi-divine, the "king of the 1970s," the "master of Greek porn," and as "the man who deservedly won the throne of the most erotic Greek actor". He was also considered a legend of surrealist sexual comedy. Gousgounis was considered an "emblematic figure who left his mark on cult [film]".

== Life and career ==
Gousgounis was born 21 March 1931 in Larissa, Thessaly, to Mimis, a photographer. His father taught him photography and he worked as a photographer in Thessaly before deciding to go to Athens. In Athens he started appearing in various films playing small roles. In 1952 he appeared in the film Agne of the Port, subsequently appearing in surrealist sex comedies, the exception being the film Peeping Tom, his only hardcore film.

He was not particularly handsome, and his acting ability was average, but his comedic and surrealist approach to acting made him a sort of avant-garde actor in Greece in the 1970s and 1980s. His appeal was widespread among the Greek social strata, ranging from students to members of the upper classes who went to see his films attracted by their comedic appeal. His career lasted from the early 1970s to mid-1980s.

His films did not follow the formulaic approach or artistic pretensions of similar Greek films of the era, and although these were primarily low budget productions, he managed to attract a large popular following and set new cinematic trends. The directors of his films allowed him the freedom to improvise during his performances.

The screening of his films created the first traffic jams in Thessaloniki, and his audience in Athens, mainly university students, after their chemistry labs, walked through the streets to the Hellespontos cinema in candlelight processions. Once at the cinema, the audience participated in the performance by lighting cigarette lighters and reciting parts of the film's dialogue, occasionally shouting Axios, Axios ("Worthy" in Greek).

He appeared in films such as O Idonoblepsias (The Peeping Tom), the award-winning Nikolas Triantafyllidis film Radio Moscow, The Overcoat (1996) and Mavro Gala (Black Milk, 2000). He also made a guest appearance in the popular Greek comedy series Tis Elados Ta Pedia (Greece's Boys). Gousgounis was the individual honoured at the 3rd Festival of Cult Greek Cinema, on 14 February 2005. In a 1971 film, titled Sex 13 Beaufort, he co-starred with Lykourgos Kallergis. He has been described as the "king of the 1970s," the "master of Greek porn," and as "the man who deservedly won the throne of the most erotic Greek actor". Gousgounis is considered an "emblematic figure who left his mark on cult [film]".

Despite the success of his films, and the adoration of his fans, Gousgounis stayed away from the Greek star-system and avoided publicity.

== Theatre ==
In the early 1980s, Gousgounis performed in a theatrical play in Athens. His premiere was at the Star Theatre with subsequent performances at the Elite Theatre in Athens. The title of the play was Gousgounis and the Tribe of the Lost Amazons. It was about a character similar to Odysseus who is shipwrecked, along with his companions, in the land of the Amazons. The encounters of Gousgounis and his comrades with the tribe of the Amazons, depicted in the play, were a source of amusement for the high-school students of that decade. The show was very successful.

== In literature ==
The comedy component of Gousgounis's films is alluded to in Maclean J. Storer's 2008 book Forward O Peasant, where the author mentions: "It didn't really matter to him if she acted like someone out of Boat Bangers III, or perhaps more accurately, given the comedy aspect, like someone in a Costas Gousgounis film".

He is featured in the book by Giannis Soldatos The History of Nudity in Cinema.

== Awards ==
Gousgounis received the Grand Prize of the 3rd Greek Festival of Cult Cinema and was the Person of Honour at the Festival. In a press release by the Festival it was mentioned that the Festival itself has "reached the peak of its luminosity by giving him the award" and he was called "the unsurpassed, legendary Gousgounis," as well as "an unsurpassed sex-symbol" and the "greatest cult hero of all seasons". He also starred and participated in multiple yearly events of the Greek Festival of Cult Cinema. During the festival he also participated in live interviews where he answered questions from the audience.

== Fan club ==
In the book Greece in Modern Times: An Annotated Bibliography of Works Published in English in 22 Academic Disciplines During the 20th Century it is mentioned that in Athens there is a fan club dedicated to Gousgounis named the Gousgounis 300. Their meeting place is the Esperia Cinema in Athens where they meet every Monday at 6:00 p.m. to watch his movies. The meetings include rituals such as candlelight processions and singing before the show starts. If the fans consider the film to be mild, they start shouting that they want to see tsonta, which in Greek means that they demand that the projection engineer add frames from another, more hardcore, film to the ongoing film projection. Similar processions in honour of Gousgounis also happened during the 1970s.

== Legacy ==
Gousgounis is considered a legendary figure of 1970s and 1980s Greek pornography. He has been described as semi-divine. He is also considered a legend of surrealist sexual comedy. According to writer Petros Tatsopoulos, in an interview published in the Greek newspaper To Vima, Gousgounis is more recognisable in Greece among youth, than even past prime ministers and academics such as Georgios Athanasiadis-Novas, and was one of the greatest stars of the 70s in Greece among the youth of the era who enjoyed the humour of his films.

His role as the security guard in an ERT TV series based on Nikos Kazantzakis's Christ Recrucified is included in a list of One Hundred Moments of Greek Television by To Vima.

I Kathimerini mentions that Gousgounis was the idol of the Greek youth of the 1970s, who "deified" him, and that a university research paper analyses the impact of stars like him, and their films, on Greek society. Gousgounis's charm has been described as "satanic".

Gousgounis was a symbol of cultural resistance during the dictatorship of the Colonels in Greece. During the showing of a film, students protested that they would rather watch Gousgounis than the film.

Greek MP Liana Kanelli has declared that if she had to choose between the subtext of the Sarkozy-Merkel alliance, which supports Berlusconi on one hand, and Gousgounis on the other, she would choose Gousgounis even in his old age.

In the critique of the film Iron Man in the newspaper To Vima, one of the leading actors is compared to a "caricature of Gousgounis with a beard".

== See also ==
- Pornography in Greece
