= Eleni Zetou =

Greek volleyball player (1956–2026)

Eleni Zetou (Greek: Ελένη Ζέτου; 12 February 1956 – 2 June 2026) was a Greek volleyball player.

== Biography ==
Zetou played for Aris Thessaloniki between 1972 and 1985, and was the captain, notably participating in the CEV Women's Challenge Cup twice.

Between 1973 and 1977, she was a member of the Greece national team.

Following her retirement, she published a number of books and papers related to the sport.

Zetou died on 2 June 2026, at the age of 70.
