= Ifigeneia Asteriadi =

Greek actress (1967–2024)

- Ιφιγένεια Αστεριάδη
- Born: 1967; Athens, Greece
- Died: 8 May 2024 (aged 57)
- Occupation: Actress

Ifigeneia Asteriadi (Greek: Ιφιγένεια Αστεριάδη; 1967 – 8 May 2024) was a Greek actress who appeared on stage, in film and on television.

== Biography ==
Asteriadi was born in Athens in 1967, she was the daughter of actor Dimitris Asteriadis. She graduated from the Theodosiadis Athens Drama School. She was a long-term collaborator with director Yannis Kakleas. She had a career on stage starring in such plays as "Accidental Death of an Anarchist", "The Taming of the Shrew", "Bullets Over Broadway" and "Cyrano". Asteriadi died on 8 May 2024. She had been diagnosed with cancer.
