= George B. Dertilis =

Greek historian (1939–2023)

George Dertilis Γιώργος Δερτιλής
- Born: 1939; Athens, Greece
- Died: 20 February 2023 (aged 84); Kythira, Greece
- Occupation: History professor
- Title: Emeritus Professor
- Spouse: Erietta Mavroudi
- Children: Natalia Germanou (stepdaughter)
- Awards: National Order of the Legion of Honor

Academic background
- Education: University of Athens, University of Sheffield
- Thesis: (1977)

Academic work
- Discipline: History
- Sub-discipline: Economic and social history
- Institutions: University of Athens, École des Hautes Études en Sciences Sociales (EHESS), Harvard University, European University Institute, University of Oxford
- Notable works: 15 books and over 50 articles in Greek, English, French, Spanish and Italian

George B. Dertilis (Greek: Γιώργος Δερτιλής; 1939 – 20 February 2023) was a Greek historian and academic. He was known for his expertise and contributions to the economic history of Greece and Europe, as well as his extensive research on the history of political thought and institutions.

== Biography ==
Born in 1939, George Dertilis pursued his higher education in Athens, Greece, where he studied public law and economic sciences at the Athens Law School of the University of Athens. After completing his undergraduate studies, he pursued postgraduate studies in Political Theory and History at the University of Sheffield in the United Kingdom.

Returning to Greece after his postgraduate studies, Dertilis was appointed a specialist scholar of economic history at the Athens Law School in 1978. He quickly rose through the academic ranks, becoming the vice-chancellor of the Athens Law School in 1980.

Three years later, he was elected full professor of Social and Economic History in the Political Science department of the Athens Law School, where he remained until his retirement in 2002 as Emeritus Professor.

In addition to his teaching at the Athens Law School, Dertilis held several visiting professorships at prestigious institutions around the world. In 2000, he was elected as a professor at the School for Advanced Studies in the Social Sciences in Paris. He also served as a visiting professor at Harvard University, the European University Institute in Florence, and the University of Oxford. His contributions to the field of history were recognized in 1989 when he was elected as a member of the Academia Europaea.

In addition to his academic positions, Dertilis held several important positions in the administration of cultural and educational institutions in Greece. In 1983 Dertilis was director of the research program which formed the Historical Archive of the Commercial Bank of Greece. He served as the chairman of the board of directors of the historical archive of the University of Athens from 1987 to 2002, which he also founded. He was also the secretary general of the board of directors of the Educational Foundation of the National Bank from 1986 to 1991. He was a regular member and director of research at the National Bank of Greece, a member of the National Research Advisory Council, the National Research Foundation, and the Schlumberger and Maison Suger Foundations in Paris. He was also the president of the Hellenic Society of Economic History.

Dertilis published fifteen books and over fifty articles that have been translated into Greek, English, French, Spanish, and Italian.

Dertilis received numerous accolades and awards for his contributions to the field of history. He was awarded the National Order of the Legion of Honor and was granted French citizenship.

== Personal life and death ==
George Dertilis was married to Erietta Mavroudi, and was the stepfather of songwriter and television hostess Natalia Germanou.

Dertilis died on 20 February 2023, in Kythira, where he lived permanently in his final years. He was 84.
