= Dionysis Simopoulos =

Greek science communicator (1943–2022)

Dionysis Simopoulos FRAS
- Διονύσης Σιμόπουλος
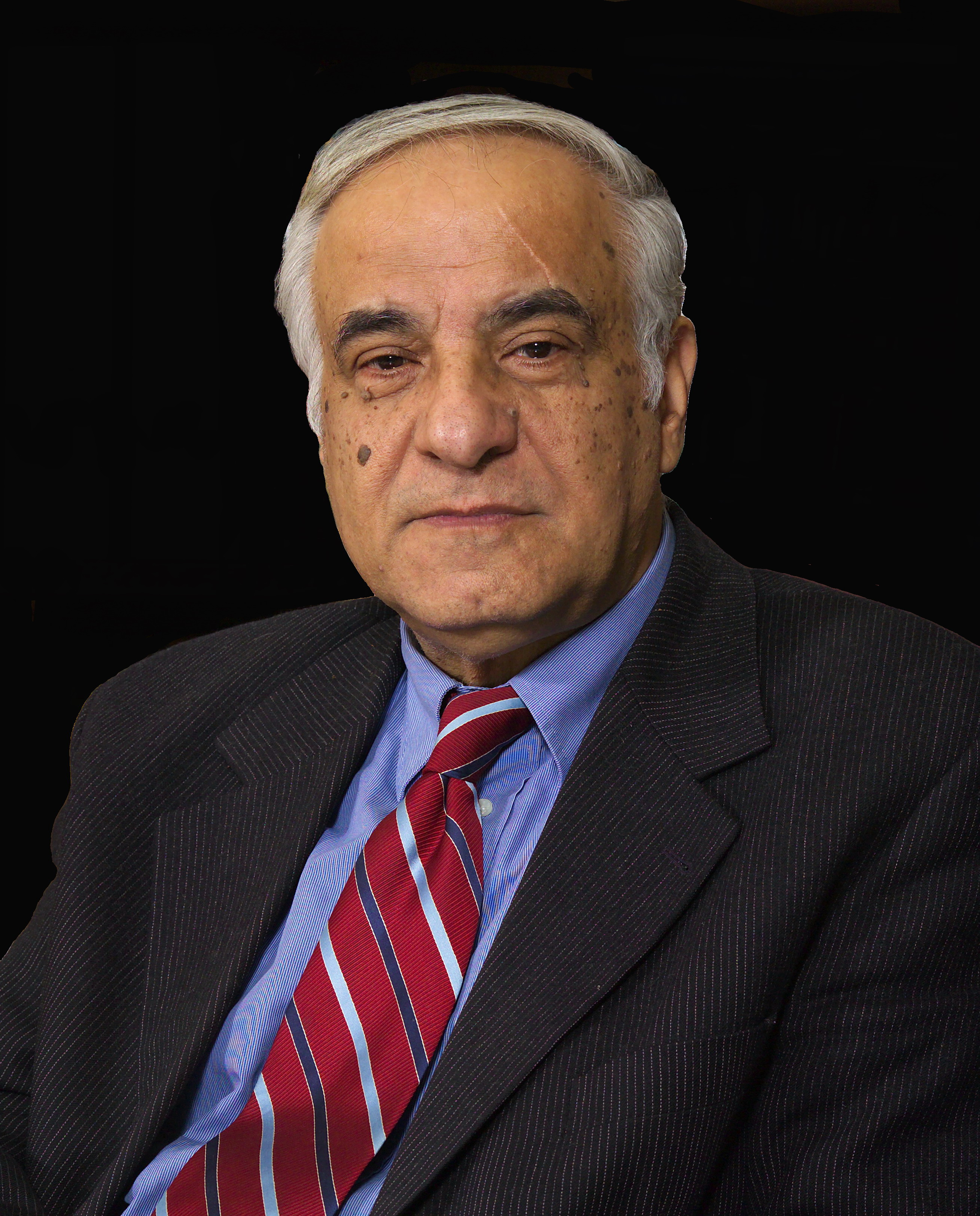
- Simopoulos in 2005
- Born: Dionysios P. Simopoulos; 8 March 1943; Ioannina, Greece
- Died: 7 August 2022 (aged 79); Athens, Greece
- Education: Louisiana State University
- Awards: 1978 FRAS; 1996 IPS Service Award; 2006 Palmes Académiques; 2012 Lifetime Achievement Award of the Hellenic Physics Society; 2015 Academy of Athens Science Award
- Scientific career
- Fields: Science communication
- Workplaces: Eugenides Planetarium; Louisiana Arts and Science Center Planetarium

Dionysis P. Simopoulos FRAS (Greek: Διονύσιος Π. (Διονύσης) Σιμόπουλος; 8 March 1943 – 7 August 2022) was a Greek astronomy educator, science communicator and director emeritus of the Eugenides Planetarium.

== Personal life ==
Dionysis P. Simopoulos was born in Ioannina, Greece, although he actually grew up in Patras. He studied political communication, from January 1963 to December 1972, at the Departments of Government. During that period he received several awards and honors in various public speaking and debating competitions.

He married Karen Louise Peterson in 1968, and they have a daughter, born in 1974, and two sons, born in 1976 and 1978.

Simopoulos died of pancreatic cancer on 7 August 2022, at the age of 79.

== Professional career ==
He started working in January 1968 and served as an Associate Curator (January–September 1968), as Assistant Director of Education (September 1968 – September 1969), and Planetarium Director (September 1969 – March 1973) at the Louisiana Arts and Science Center in Baton Rouge, and as a Special Advisor to the Science Committee of the School Board (1970–1973). In October 1972, he was invited to return to Athens by the Eugenides Foundation where he worked as the Eugenides Planetarium's Director for 41 years (April 1973 – 2014). He has taught in many seminars for university graduates and business executives as an instructor of communication, decision making and problem solving. He has actively attended numerous professional conferences and seminars and has published hundreds of articles in Greek and foreign magazines and newspapers.

== Professional activities ==
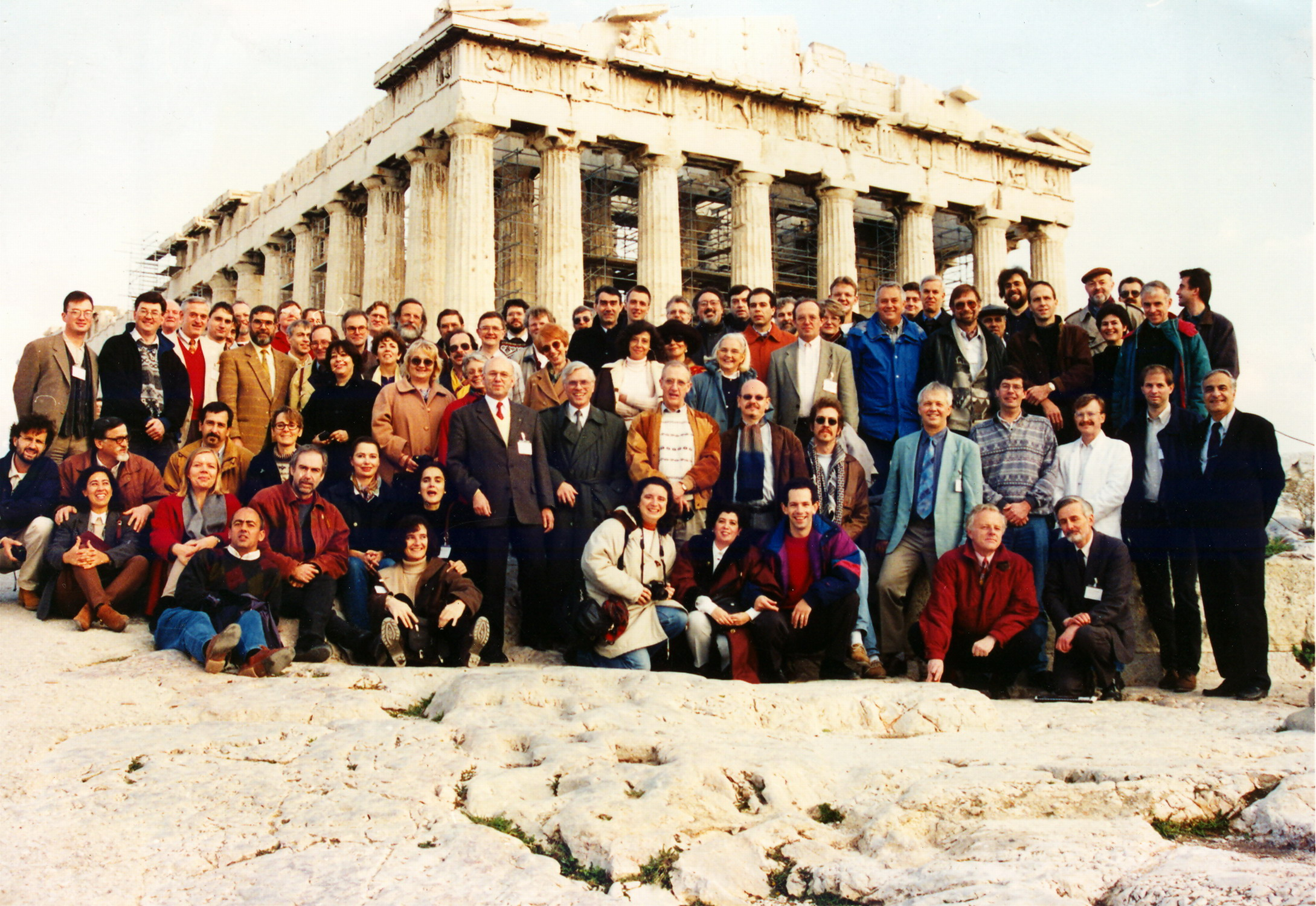
Representatives from 30 European Countries at the Constitutional Assembly of the European Association for Astronomy Education in Athens on 25 November 1995.

He served as the President of the European Association for Astronomy Education (1994–2002), as a member of the Executive Council of the International Planetarium Society (1978–2008) and as the Secretary General of the European-Mediterranean Planetarium Association (1976–2008). He was a Fellow of the Royal Astronomical Society (since 1978) and the International Planetarium Society (since 1980) and held memberships in many other international scientific organizations. In 1996, he received the highest honor (IPS Service Award) of the International Planetarium Society for his contribution to the international astronomy education, and in 2006, he was honored with the Palmes Académiques of the French Republic. In 2012 the Hellenic Physics Society (EEF) honored him with a special lifetime achievement award for his contributions to the popularization of science in Greece. At the 2015 annual festive session of the Academy of Athens, the country's highest scientific and cultural institution, Simopoulos received the Academy's Science Award "for his overall contribution to the popularization and dissemination of astronomy and the exemplary operation of the Eugenides Planetarium."

== Audiovisual activities ==
He has written more than 500 scripts for science shows and documentary series for the Greek PBS System (ERT). He has written over 250 planetarium show scripts, two sets of scripts (30 and 24 episodes) for special video lessons on astronomy and space science (for the Greek Ministry of Education), a series of four CD-ROMs on astronomy, and has delivered more than 500 lectures on science and astrophysics all over Greece.

=== Scripts for television series ===
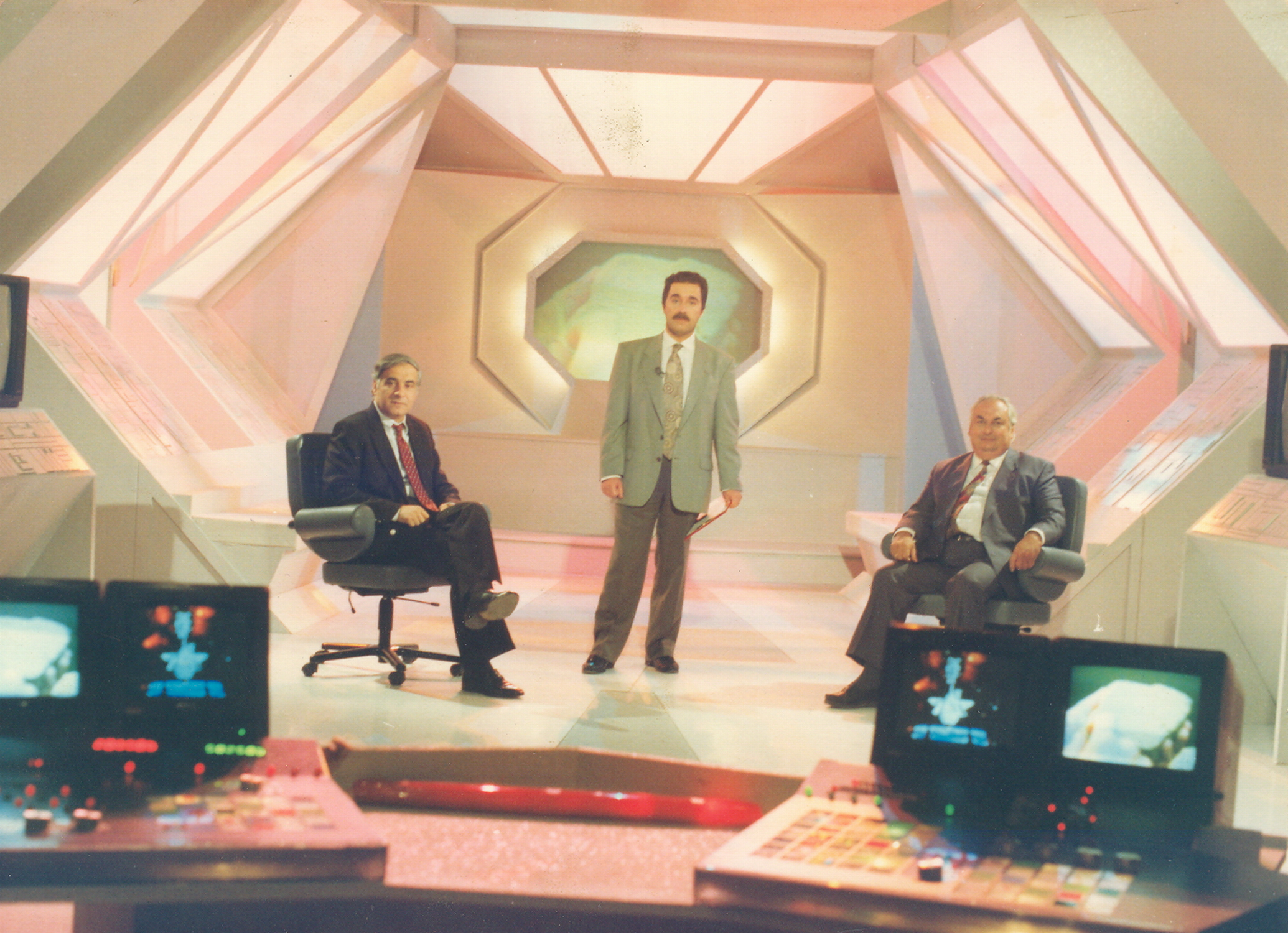
Recording an interview for the documentary series The Pathways of the Stars. On the show's set are Dionysis Simopoulos and Antonios Kontaratos with the show's presenter Kostas Yiannopoulos (standing)

- Red Giants, White Dwarfs: (1982–1986, ΕΤ-1) A series of 195 half-hour shows on physical sciences.
- Opinion Polls:(1985, ET-1) A series of 12 half-hour shows on public opinion polls.
- Greece and the World: (1986–1987, ΕΤ-1) A series of 39 half-hour instructional shows.
- Explorers: (1988, ΕΤ-1) A series of 13 half-hour instructional shows.
- Young Explorers: (1989, ΕΤ-1) A series of 26 half-hour instructional shows.
- My Five Wonderful Collaborators: (1989–1990, ΕΤ2) A series of 26 half-hour instructional shows on the five senses.
- Target: (1990–1991, ΕΤ-1) A series of 13 half-hour instructional shows.
- Space: (1991, ΕΤ-1) A series of 18 5-min instructional videos for young people.
- The Pathways of the Stars: (1992–1993, ΕΤ-1) A series of 14 45-min. documentaries on space exploration.
- The Star of Christmas: (1994, ΕΤ2) A one-hour documentary
- The Great Adventure: (1994–1995, Educational Television, Ministry of Education) A series of 30 15-min documentaries on space science.
- Tele-Quiz: (1995–1996, ΕΤ2) A series of 26 half-hour instructional shows.
- Windows to the Universe': (1998–1999, Educational Television, Ministry of Education) A series of 24 15-min documentaries on astronomy for High School students .
- Phenomena: (science advisor, 2000–2001, ΕΤ-1) A series of four documentaries on general science.

== Writing activities ==
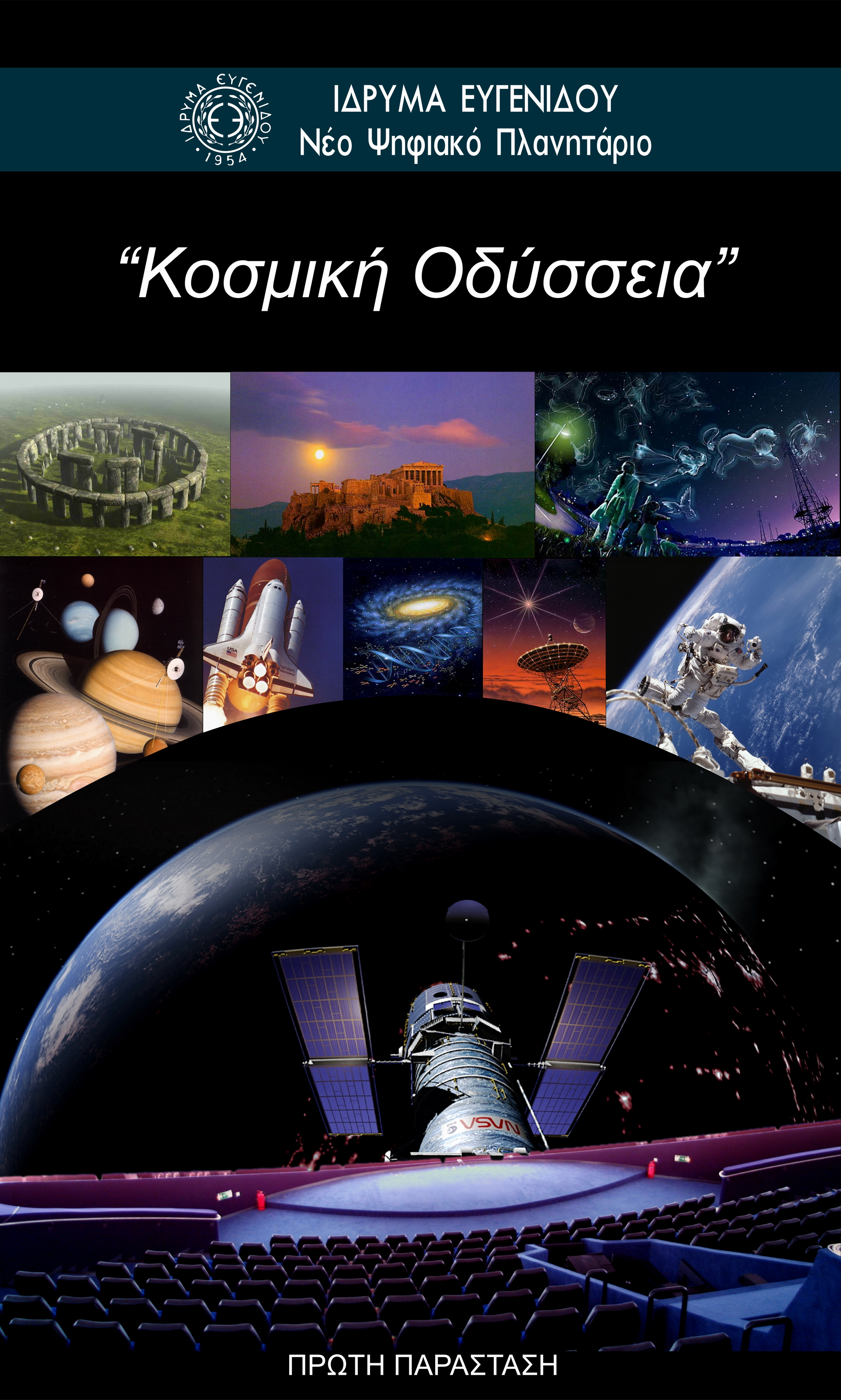
The guidebook of the first Eugenides Planetarium Digital Production titled Cosmic Odyssey was published in November 2003.

He served as a science Collaborator and columnist for the newspapers Vradyni (1970–1975), Sunday Eleftherotypia (1990–1992), Sunday Ethnos (1993–2010), Sunday Kathimerini (2014–) and for the magazines Georama-Experiment (1995–2005), Erevnites (Kathimerini, 1999–2004), PCWorld (2004–2007) and GEOtropio (Eleftherotypia, 2000–2010). He was also a member of the Editorial Board of the IPS Journal The Planetarian (1978–2008), has authored a series of six books for young people titled The Secrets of the Universe (Erevnites) and a series of 18 books for the planetarium shows (Eugenides Foundation).

=== Bibliography ===
- The Birth of the Stars', Athens: Erevnites, 1996, 104 pp. (ISBN 978-960-368-022-2)
- The Death of the Stars', Athens: Erevnites, 1997, 102 pp.
- Planets and Satellites', Athens: Erevnites, 1999, 104 pp.
- At the Earth's Neighbourhood', Athens: Erevnites, 2001, 112 pp.
- The Discovery of the Galaxies', Athens: Erevnites, 2003, 112 pp.
- Cosmic Odyssey, Athens: Eugenides Foundation, 2003, 64 pp.
- Voyage without an End, Athens: Eugenides Foundation, 2004, 120 pp.
- New Horizons, Athens: Eugenides Foundation, 2005, 120 pp.
- Genesis and Cataclysm, Athens: Eugenides Foundation, 2006, 120 pp.
- Black Holes, Athens: Eugenides Foundation, 2006, 120 pp.
- The Star of Christmas, Athens: Eugenides Foundation, 2006, 120 pp.
- The Dance of the Planets, Athens: Eugenides Foundation, 2007, 64 pp.
- The Pathway of the Sun, Athens: ELTA, Hellenic Post, 2007, 120 pp.
- From the Earth to the Moon, Athens: Eugenides Foundation, 2007, 120 pp.
- The Violent Universe, Athens: Eugenides Foundation, 2008, 120 pp.
- The 7 Wonders of the Cosmos, Athens: Eugenides Foundation, 2008, 140 pp.
- The Biography of the Universe, Athens: Erevnites, 2008, 112 pp. (ISBN 978-960-368-438-1)
- Death of the Stars, Athens: Eugenides Foundation, 2009, 120 pp.
- The Great Adventure, Athens: Eugenides Foundation, 2009, 128 pp.
- The Day Star, Athens: Eugenides Foundation, 2010, 120 pp.
- Windows to the Universe, Athens: Eugenides Foundation, 2011, 120 pp.
- Evolution, Athens: Eugenides Foundation, 2011, 120 pp.
- The Mystery of Life, Athens: Eugenides Foundation, 2012, 120 pp.
- Ancient Skies, Athens: Eugenides Foundation, 2012, 120 pp.
- The Living Planet, Athens: Eugenides Foundation, 2013, 120 pp.
- Pathways of the Stars, Athens: Eugenides Foundation, 2013, 120 pp.
- We Are Stardust, Athens: Metaixmio, 2017, 200 pp. (ISBN 978-618-03-1234-8)

== Sources ==
- The Eugenides Planetarium: 10 Years of the New Digital Planetarium, Athens: Eugenides Foundation, 2013, 74 σελ.
- RetroDB: Κόκκινοι γίγαντες άσπροι νάνοι
- Retromaniax Forum: Κόκκινοι γίγαντες άσπροι νάνοι
- Interview to Mema Stathopoulou, 22 June 2007
- Interview to Yiannis Triantafyllou in "Eleftherotypia", 24 June 2008
- Doctv, Interview to Melita Karali, 1 October 2010.
- Interview to the "Education" magazine, 22 December 2010.
- Interview to the "Astrovox" portal, 17 April 2011
- ellines.com Interview to "Real News", 9 October 2011
- Interview to Petros Birbilis in "MediaSoup", 16 October 2011
- Interview to Maria Katsounaki in "Sunday’s Kathimerini": «Η Ελλάδα διαθέτει τα καλύτερα μυαλά», 15 July 2012
- Interview to Nektaria Karakosta in "Diagnosis": «Το μέλλον της Ελλάδας είναι οι άνθρωποί της», 27 December 2012
- Interview to Georgia Georgakarakou in "Ta Nea": "Δεσμοί Αίματος", 9 February 2013
- Interview to George Kiousis in "Eleftherotypia": «Να γίνετε ‘ερασιτέχνες’ σε οτιδήποτε κι αν κάνετε», 21 July 2013
- Interview to Takis Scrivanos in "Athens Voice", 16 October 2013
- Interview to Yiannis Triantafyllou in "LIFO": «Dionysis Simopoulos de profundis», 18 November 2013
- Interview to Evangelia Kakleidakis in «e-Maga.gr», 1 December 2013
- Interview to Stelios Voyiagakis in "Ethnos": "Counting Stars for a whole Lifetime", 25 April 2015
- Interview to Panos Sakkas, “Συνέντευξη με τον γήινο Διονύση Σιμόπουλο”, ΣΚΑΪ, 10 Δεκεμβρίου 2016
- Interview to Lida Arnellou, “Συνέντευξη με τον Διονύση Σιμόπουλο: Ένα ταξίδι στο χθες και το σήμερα”, Πρίσμα, 1 Ιανουαρίου 2017
- Interview to Fanis Vgenopoulos, “Ο αστροφυσικός Διονύσης Σιμόπουλος πιο γήινος από ποτέ!” TheBest, 9 Ιανουαρίου 2017
- Interview to Panos Sakkas, O Διονύσης Σιμόπουλος «κρυφακούει» τα βαρυτικά κύματα”, ΣΚΑΪ, 29 Ιανουαρίου 2017
- Interview to Katia Tsimblaki, “O Δ. Σιμόπουλος στο CNN Greece”, CNN Greece, 30 Ιανουαρίου 2017
- Newsroom, “Διονύσης Σιμόπουλος, Γιατί τόση φαιδρότητα για το Εθνικό Κέντρο Διαστημικών Εφαρμογών;”, The Huffington Post, 1 Φεβρουαρίου 2017
- Interview to Yiannis Triantafyllou, "Διονύσης Σιμόπουλος – "Μικρό παιδί σαν ήμουνα..." ”, POPLIKE, 20 Φεβρουαρίου 2017
