= Nikos Salikas =

Greek politician (1940–2022)

Member of the Hellenic Parliament
- In office 18 June 1989 – 11 September 1993
- Constituency: Rodopi

Personal details
- Born: 28 October 1940 Aigeiros, Greece
- Died: 21 June 2022 (aged 81)
- Party: ERE (before 1974); ND
- Education: Aristotle University of Thessaloniki

Nikos Salikas (Greek: Νίκος Σαλίκας; 28 October 1940 – 21 June 2022) was a Greek politician.

A member of New Democracy, he served in the Hellenic Parliament from 1989 to 1993.

Salikas died on 21 June 2022 at the age of 81.
