= Yannis Ziagas =

Greek politician (1940–2025)

- Γιάννης Ζιάγκας
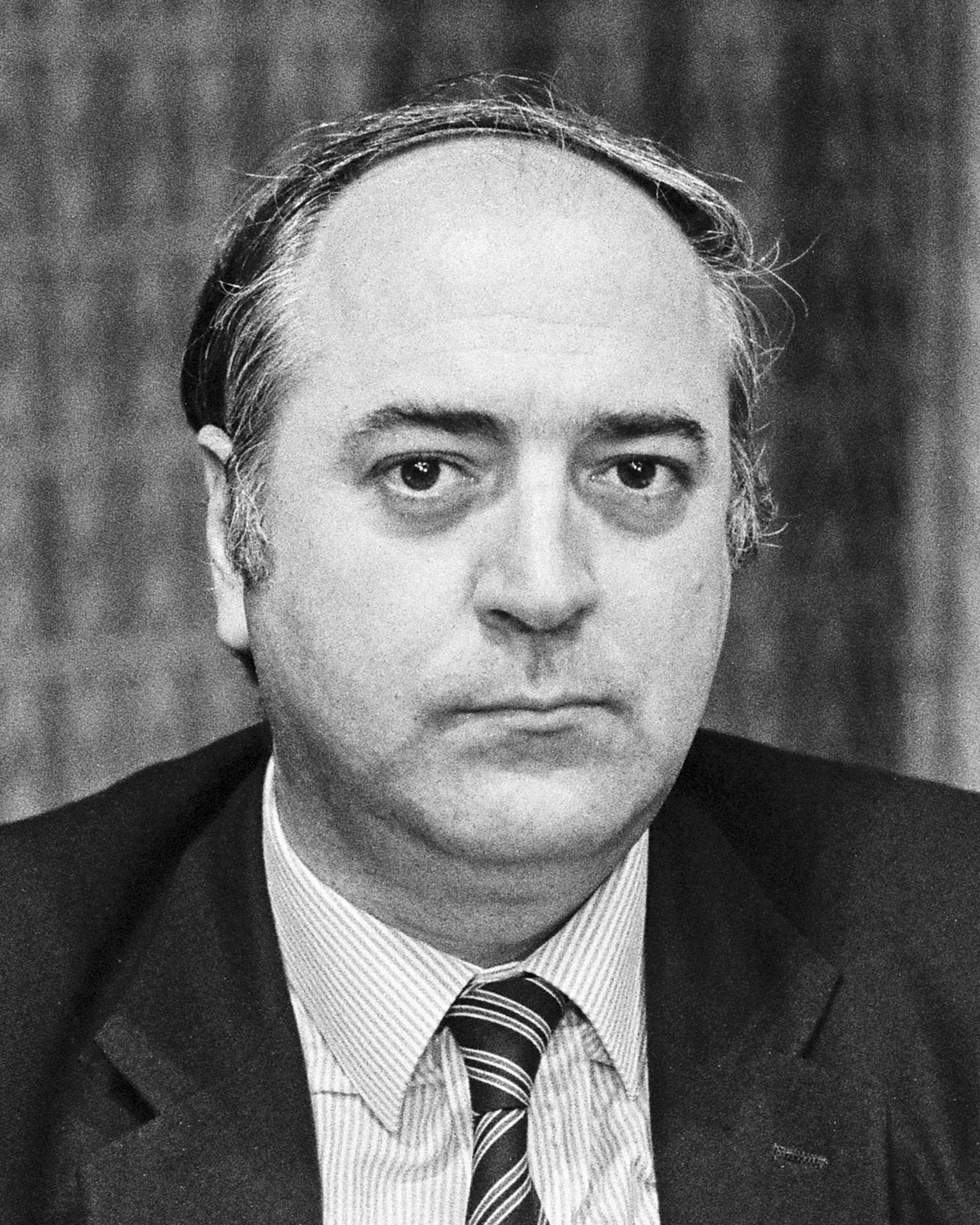
- Ziagas in 1983

Member of the Hellenic Parliament for Trikala
- In office 22 September 1996 – 14 March 2000
- In office 2 June 1985 – 11 September 1993

Member of the European Parliament for Greece
- In office 6 July 1982 – 23 July 1984

Personal details
- Born: 12 December 1940 Trikala, Greece
- Died: 26 January 2025 (aged 84) Trikala, Greece
- Party: PASOK
- Education: Graz University of Technology
- Occupation: Businessman

Yannis Ziagas (Greek: Γιάννης Ζιάγκας; 12 December 1940 – 26 January 2025) was a Greek politician. A member of PASOK, he served in the European Parliament from 1982 to 1984 and in the Hellenic Parliament from 1985 to 1993 and again from 1996 to 2000.

Ziagas died in Trikala on 26 January 2025, at the age of 84.
