= Nikolaos Deligiorgis =

Greek magazine editor and publisher (1937–2022)

Nikolaos Deligiorgis (Greek: Νικόλαος Δεληγιώργης; 14 May 1937 – 13 June 2022) was a Greek magazine editor and publisher.

== Life and career ==
Nikos Deligiorgis was born on 14 May 1937 in Piraeus, Greece. In 1971 he secured from "Ελλάς Πρες" and co-created the "Γκολ" magazine, which was reissued much later. In June 1972 he published, together with the journalist Costas Bazaios, "Μανίνα", initially in large format, which sold more than 100,000 sheets per week. This was followed by the weekly "Αγόρι" and the 15-day "Τρουένο" and "Πάττυ". Also in the late 1980s, he published "Βαβούρα" (weekly for children with a developed sense of humor) and in the 1990s, "Γκάρφιλντ" magazine.

Deligiorgis died on 13 June 2022, at the age of 85.
