= Customs Service of Greece =

Customs Service of Greece Τελωνειακή Υπηρεσία
- Common name: Ελληνικά Τελωνεία

Agency overview
- Formed: October 5, 1917

Jurisdictional structure
- Operations jurisdiction: Independent Authority of Public Revenue

Operational structure
- Agency executive: Constantine Mourtides, General Manager of Customs and Excise Duties

Facilities
- Stations: 93

Website
- aade.gr/customs

Customs Service (Greek: Τελωνειακή Υπηρεσία) is a Greek authority that certifies and collects duties, taxes, and other charges in accordance with applicable national and European legislation. It is also responsible for the protection of public health and the protection of Greek society. It conducts checks to detect drug trafficking, gunrunning, explosives, money laundering, illicit trade in antiquities; and it cracks down counterfeit consumer goods and irregularities in transport, fisheries, flora and fauna. Matthew the Apostle is considered the patron saint of Customs. Today, there are ninety-three customs offices across the country.

== History ==
The Customs Service has been confirmed to exist since the time of classical Athens of the Golden Age of Pericles, and also during the Byzantine period with the Κομμέρκιονas, an institution for the collection of duties and the control of products. Customs Service was initially organized in 1818, in Ottoman Greece, according to the French model, under the Ministry of Finance of the Ottoman Empire (Hazîne-i Âmire). On July 28, 1823, the first customs law was issued. The customs of Kardamyli and Limeni are mentioned as the first customs that operated. On April 25, 1830, the first register was issued, which, among other things, provided for the maintenance of a book for the detailed recording of incoming goods from abroad. The first customs office was established on March 25, 1833 in Syros and two years later in Piraeus, Hydra, Patras and Nafplio.

== Administration ==
Customs officers perform their official duties in uniform. Customs officers are pre-investigators and in the performance of their control and prosecution duties are entitled to bear arms.

Since 2017, Customs Service is under the Independent Authority of Public Revenue (previously General Secretariat of Public Revenue of the Ministry of Finance).
