= Charis Kostopoulos =

Greek singer-songwriter, poet, and composer

Charis Costopoulos Χάρης Κωστόπουλος

Background information
- Born: Charilaos Constantopoulos; Greek: Χαρίλαος Κωνσταντόπουλος; 16 March 1964; Aridaia, Greece
- Died: 20 January 2024 (aged 59) Piraeus, Greece
- Genres: Laïko
- Occupation: Musician
- Instruments: vocals, bouzouki
- Years active: 1975–2024
- Label: Heaven Music

Charis Costopoulos (Greek: Χάρης Κωστόπουλος, 16 March 1964 – 20 January 2024) was a Greek singer-songwriter, poet, and composer. He started his career in 1975, at the age of 11, playing bouzouki. His albums were released on labels such as RCA Records, Virus Music, and Heaven Music. His 1998 song "Σε θυμάμαι" ("I Remember You") was covered by Aca Lukas (as "Koma") and became a major hit.

== Personal life and death ==
Kostopoulos was married and had two sons. He died of cancer on 20 January 2024, at the age of 59.

== Discography ==
- 1987 – Ας Ξεχαστώ ("Let's Forget")
- 1990 – Πειρατικά ("Pirates")
- 1991 – Τελευταία Προσφορά Μου ("My Last Offer")
- 1993 – Παραμιλάω ("I Talk")
- 1994 – Μια Βραδιά Με Το Χάρη ("An Evening With Grace")
- 1995 – Υποχρέωση ("Obligation")
- 1996 – Γεμάτα Φεγγάρια ("Full Moons")
- 1998 – Με Ξεχνάς ("Forget Me")
- 1999 – Καζίνο ("Casino")
- 2000 – Εδώ Σε Θέλω ("Here I Want You")
- 2002 – Ήρθε Ο Καιρός ("The Time Has Come")
- 2002 – Live 2002
- 2003 – Αμαρτίες ("Sins")
- 2005 – Δυο Ξένοι ("Two Strangers")
- 2006 – Είσαι Μια Θεά ("You're A Goddess")
- 2006 – Χαρτιά Σημαδεμένα ("Papers Marked")
- 2007 – 34 Ψυχεδελικά Τσιφτετέλια ("34 Psychedelic Meatballs")
- 2007 – Όλο Χωρίζω Kι Όλο Γυρίζω ("Everything I'm Dividing and Everything I'm Returning")
- 2008 – Είσαι Κατάλληλη ("You're Suitable")
- 2009 – Πρώτο Θέμα ("First Theme")
- 2010 – Live (2 CDs)
- 2011 – Και Παρασύρθηκα ("And I Carried Away")
- 2012 – Έχω Γεννηθεί Ωραίος ("I Was Born Beautiful")
- 2013 – Παραπάτησα ("I Tripped")
- 2014 – Συνωμότησε Η Φύση ("Nature Conspired")
- 2014 – Φέρτε Τα Ποτά ("Bring The Drinks")
- 2014 – Ψυχασθενής ("Psychopath")
- 2015 – Η Καταστροφή Μου ("My Destruction")
- 2015 – Είναι Να Μην Βάλω Κάτι Στο Μυαλό Μου ("It's Not To Put Something On My Mind")
- 2016 – Πως Να Σε Ξεπεράσω ("How To Get Over You")
- 2016 – Κύκλους Κάνει ("Makes Circles")
- 2016 – Το Διασκεδάζω ("I Have Fun")
- 2016 – Φήμες ("Rumours")
- 2017 – Χάρης Κωστόπουλος – Live ("Charis Kostopoulos– Live")
- 2017 – Θα Παρεκτραπώ ("I'll Divert")
- 2017 – Έχω Περάσει Από Φωτιές ("I've Been Through Fires")
- 2017 – Τα Καλύτερα Συστατικά ("The Best Ingredients")
- 2018 – Θα Χορέψει Όλη Η Ελλάδα ("All Greece Will Dance")
- 2018 – Καίω τη νύχτα ("I burn the night")
- 2019 – Πίνω Και Γυρίζουν Όλα ("I Drink And Everything Turns")
- 2019 – Για Να Ξέρεις ("For You to Know")
