= Hellenic Coast Guard =

Military unit and national coast guard

Hellenic Coast Guard Λιμενικό Σώμα-Ελληνική Ακτοφυλακή
- Hellenic Coast Guard badge

- Flag
- Abbreviation: HCG

Agency overview
- Formed: 1919
- Employees: 8,000
- Legal personality: Government agency

Jurisdictional structure
- Operations jurisdiction: Greece
- Constituting instruments: Law No. 1753/1919; Law No. 3922/2011
- Specialist jurisdiction: Coastal patrol, marine border protection, marine search and rescue

Operational structure
- Elected officer responsible: Vasilis Kikilias, Minister of Maritime Affairs and Insular Policy
- Agency executives: Vice admiral Tryfon Kontizas, Commandant; Vice admiral Alexandros Tselikis, First Deputy Commandant; Rear admiral Fotios Kiamos, Second Deputy Commandant
- Parent agency: Ministry of Maritime Affairs and Insular Policy

Facilities
- Boats: 240 vessels
- Fixed wing aircraft: Cessna 406 Caravan II; Cessna 172 Skyhawk; Socata TB
- Helicopters: Eurocopter AS365 Dauphin

Website
- www.hcg.gr

The Hellenic Coast Guard (Greek: Λιμενικό Σώμα-Ελληνική Ακτοφυλακή, romanized: Limeniko Soma-Elliniki Aktofylaki, lit. 'Harbor Corps-Hellenic Coast Guard') is the national coast guard of Greece. Like many other coast guards, it is a paramilitary organization that can support the Hellenic Navy in wartime, but resides under separate civilian control in times of peace. The officers and the enlisted members of the Coast Guard are regarded as military personnel under Military's Penal Code. It was founded in 1919 by an Act of Parliament (Law No. 1753–1919) and the legal framework for its function was reformed in 1927. Its primary mission is the enforcement of Greek, European and International law in the maritime areas.

Historically, it is very closely associated with the Greek shipping industry; many Coast Guard officers retire early to find employment in Greek and international companies owned by Greek ship-owners.

== Role and responsibilities ==
The main activities of the Hellenic Coast Guard are defined in the present legislation and specified within its institutional framework of operation. These activities are the following:

- Ensuring public order, including general policing and traffic policing.
- Safeguarding of public and state security.
- Law enforcement at sea, ports and coastal areas.Maritime border control. Surveillance of the sea, shipping, ports and borders. Drug interdiction.
- Search and rescue (jointly with the Hellenic Air Force and Hellenic Navy).
- Safety of navigation (with the exception of lighthouses, racons and buoys, which are constructed, purchased, installed and maintained by the Hellenic Navy Lighthouse Service).
- Protection of the marine environment and response to marine pollution incidents.
- Provision of emergency maritime radio communication services.
- Port operations (excluding port pilots service).
- Merchant Ships and Shipping Companies inspection.
- Representation of Greece in international organizations and the European Commission in matters related to these roles.

In order to perform these roles, the Coast Guard operate a number of patrol boats of various sizes (6m to 60m) and different types (RIBs, coastal patrol boats, offshore patrol boats, lifeboats and pollution control vessels). On land the Hellenic Coast Guard is equipped with 634 vehicles, including patrol vehicles, cars and motorcycles, buses and mini vans, trucks and tanker. The Coast Guard also operate seven airplanes and six helicopters.

== Organization ==
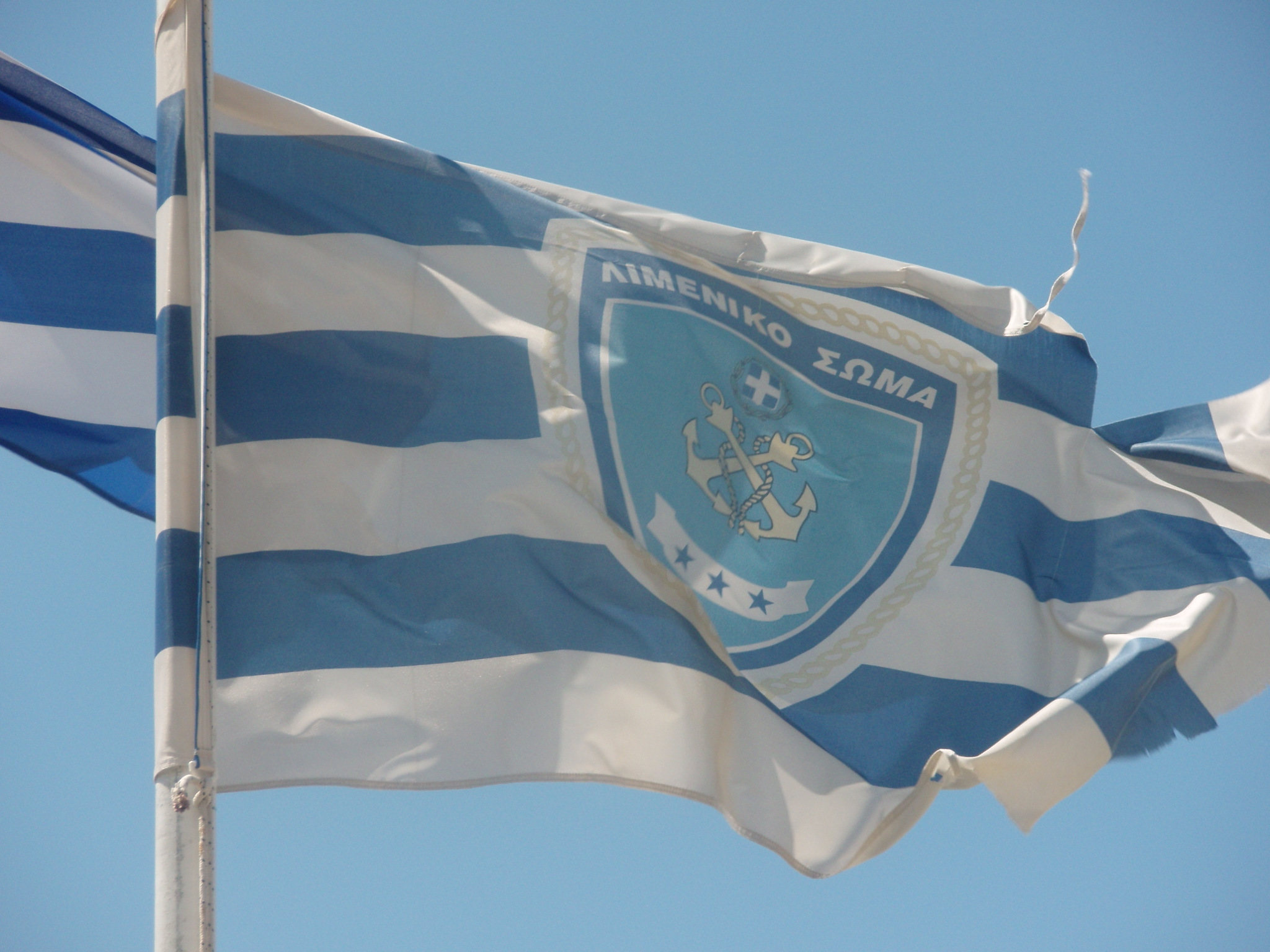
Flag of the Hellenic Coast Guard flown in front of the Coast Guard offices in Rethymno Harbour.

The Hellenic Coast Guard is under the authority of the Ministry of Shipping and Island Policy, which is headed by a commandant and assisted by two deputy commandants who all have the rank of vice admiral (Antinavarchos). As of 2022, Georgios Alexandrakis serves as Commandant of the Hellenic Coast Guard.

The Hellenic Coast Guard operates the Maritime Rescue Coordination Center (MRCC) in Piraeus and the Emergency Radio Communications Station SXE at Aspropyrgos (38°02′12.5″N 23°35′7.5″E). The Hellenic Coast Guard also operates the Vessel Traffic Service (V.T.M.I.S.) at busy sea lanes, currently around the ports of Piraeus, Elefsis, Lavrion and Rafina.

Between May 21, 1964, and 1980 the Hellenic Coast Guard had its own special flag, which was derived from the Greek Ensign with the addition of the crossed anchors badge on the center of the white cross.

== Personnel ==
Most officers in recent years are graduates from higher education establishments, including the Merchant Marine Academies. After recruitment new officers study for four years at the Hellenic Naval Academy. Petty officers are trained for two years at Palaskas Naval Training Centre and lower rank enlisted men are trained at Scholi Limenofylakon (Greek: Σχολή Λιμενoφυλάκων, romanized: Sxoli Limenofilakon) at Piraeus, for a duration of two years. With law Law 4029 of 2011, a volunteer Auxiliary Coast Guard was established. The Officers of the Hellenic Coast Guard have the same ranks as the Officers of the Hellenic Navy and similar insignia, replacing the curl with two crossed anchors. The Petty Officers (Ratings) also use rank insignia similar to those of the Hellenic Navy, replacing the speciality symbol with the crossed anchors badge.

== Ranks and insignia ==
=== Commissioned officers ===
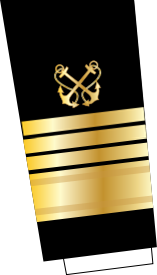
| NATO code | OF-10 | OF-9 | OF-8 | OF-7 | OF-6 | OF-5 | OF-4 | OF-3 | OF-2 | OF-1 |
|---|---|---|---|---|---|---|---|---|---|---|---|
| Hellenic Coast Guard |
| Hellenic Coast Guard | None | Admiral; Ναύαρχος; Navarchos | Vice Admiral; Αντιναύαρχος; Antinavarchos | Rear Admiral; Υποναύαρχος; Yponavarchos | Commodore; Αρχιπλοίαρχος; Archiploiarchos | Captain; Πλοίαρχος; Ploiarchos | Commander; Αντιπλοίαρχος; Antiploiarchos | Lieutenant Commander; Πλωτάρχης; Plotarchis | Lieutenant; Υποπλοίαρχος; Ypoploiarchos | Sub-Lieutenant; Ανθυποπλοίαρχος; Anthypoploiarchos | Ensign; Σημαιοφόρος; Simaioforos |

=== NCOs and enlisted ===
| NATO code | OR-9 | OR-8 | OR-7 | OR-6 | OR-5 | OR-4 | OR-3 | OR-2 | OR-1 |
|---|---|---|---|---|---|---|---|---|---|
| Hellenic Coast Guard |
| Hellenic Coast Guard | Warrant Officer; Ανθυπασπιστής; Anthypaspistis | Master Chief Petty Officer; Αρχικελευστής; Archikelefstis | Chief Petty Officer; Επικελευστής; Epikelefstis | Petty Officer; Κελευστής; Kelefstis | | Harbor-guard; Λιμενοφύλακας; Limenofylakas |

== Fleet ==
As of 2015, the structure of the Hellenic Coast Guard consists of a fleet of five Offshore Patrol Vessels (OPVs) sized 45–60 metres in length and of 300-450 tons displacement, six to twelve Patrol boats with lengths of 25–30 meters, and more than fifty Coastal Patrol Vessels of various types with lengths of 14–20 meters. In addition, the Hellenic Coast Guard operates a large number of fast Rigid-Inflatable Boat (RIB)/Special Forces vessels as well as eleven Lifeboats. Currently, the Hellenic Coast Guard fleet in its totality consists of approximately 240-250 vessels of all types. In August 2023, the Hellenic Coast Guard ordered 31 Munin S1200 patrol boats and three Metis high-speed RHIBs. Five Finnish-built fast patrol boats "Watercat 2000 Patrol" were ordered in early November 2023.

| Model & Class | Photo | Type | Length (m) | Displacement (tonnes) | Origin | Year of Introduction | In service | Notes |
|---|---|---|---|---|---|---|---|---|
| Stan Patrol 5509 / Class Gavdos | | OPV | 58,5 | 565 | The Netherlands | 2015 | 1 | Vessel ΛΣ-090, built by Damen shipyards; delivered October 2015 with more than 82,5% funding from EU's External Borders Fund; weapon systems of choice to be installed still unspecified Speed 27-30 knots |
| Sa'ar 4.5 / Class Fourni | | OPV | 58 | 400 | IsraelGreece | 2003 | 3 | Vessels ΛΣ-060, ΛΣ-070 built in Israel (2003) and ΛΣ-080 built in Greece (2004) are weapon-downsized/modified FACs - each with an OTO Breda 30mm/70 gun as main armament and two remote controlled .50" heavy machine guns without anti-ship missiles; acquired prior to the 2004 Athens Olympics; Speed 34.5 knots |
| Vosper Europatrol 250 Mk1 / Class Arkoi | | OPV | 47.3 | 300 | United Kingdom | 2002 | 1 | Vessel ΛΣ-050 originally bought by Financial Crime Prosecution Authorities 1994; transferred to HCG 2002 - remained decommissioned due mechanical problems; significant maintenance and repairs 2014; entered active service following donations from "Aikaterini Laskaridi" Foundation Can be armed with 40mm gun as main weapon system Speed 40 knots |
| Cantiere Navale Vittoria P355 GR / Class Marinos Zampatis | | OPV | 36.3 | 160 | Italy | 2020 | 4 | Three ships ordered January 2019, with a plus one option - exercised July 2019 (90% EU funding); first two ships received December 2020; fourth January 2022; to replace the older Dilos (Abeking) class and to be fitted with 2x.50 LRCWS(Light Remotely Controlled Weapon Stations); Vessels ΛΣ-900, ΛΣ-910, ΛΣ-920, ΛΣ-930; speed 40 knots |
| Abeking & Rasmussen / Class Dilos (Δήλος) | | Patrol | 29 | | Greece | 1977 | 6 | Vessels ΛΣ-010, ΛΣ-015, ΛΣ-020, ΛΣ-025, ΛΣ-030, ΛΣ-040 by Marinos Zampatis class; design by Abeking & Rasmussen and built by ENAE shipyards Speed 27 knots |
| MAGNAR 1950 | | Patrol | 21,2 | | Greece | 2026 | 7 | Fast patrol boat built by VIKING LIFE-SAVING EQUIPMENT HELLAS; contract for 7 signed October 2026, with option for another 7. RWS to be installed upon delivery Speed 50 knots |
| POB-24G / Class Faiakas (Φαίακας) | | Patrol | 24.6 | 50 | Croatia | 2015 | 2 | Vessels ΛΣ-617 and ΛΣ-618 delivered; remaining four boats (type POB-24G) initial order to not be delivered following legal action of HCG against manufacturer; Vessel ΛΣ-618 equipped with an EMILY robotic SAR device; all boats have .50" heavy machine gun; speed 32 knots |
| Javelin-74 | | Coastal Patrol | 19.2 | 27 | Greece | 2002 | 3 | Vessels ΛΣ-192, ΛΣ-193, ΛΣ-194; Speed 50+ knots |
| LCS-57 (Lambro-57) Mk.II | | Coastal Patrol | 19.2 | 27 | Greece | 2002 | 16 | Vessels ΛΣ-601 to ΛΣ-616; Built by MotoMarine-Greece; speed 50+ knots |
| LCS-57 (Lambro-57) Mk.I | | Coastal Patrol | 18.2 | 28 | Greece | 1998 | 19 | Vessels ΛΣ-137 to ΛΣ-151 and ΛΣ-169 to ΛΣ-172; Built by MotoMarine-Greece; speed 44 knots |
| LCS-53 (Lambro-53 Guardian) | | Coastal Patrol | 16.8 | 21 | Greece | 1992 | 11 | Vessels ΛΣ-114 to ΛΣ-126; Built by MotoMarine-Greece; speed 33 knots |
| Fabio Buzzi Design 56SF | | Patrol / HCG Special Forces | 16,10 | | Italy | | 0/15 | 15 Fabio Buzzi 56F patrol boats ordered January 2020 - to be delivered by 2023; speed 50+ knots |
| CB-90HCG | | Patrol / HCG Special Forces | 15.9 | 18.5 | Sweden | 1999 | 3 | Combat boats by Dockstavarvet; armed with two twin remote-controlled .50" heavy machine guns with level IV armor plates Vessels ΛΣ-134 to ΛΣ-136; allocated to the HCG's Special Forces (Ionian Islands); speed 45 knots |
| Olympic D65/74 | | Coastal Patrol | 22.5 | 30 | Greece | 1973 - under decommissioning | 4 | Unknown number of boats still in service for secondary tasks / ΛΣ-102 series |
| Olympic D-45M | | Coastal Patrol | 13.9 | 25 | Greece | 1973 - under decommissioning | 5 | Unknown number of boats still in service for secondary tasks |
| Olympic D-45 | | Coastal Patrol | 13.9 | 25 | Greece | 1973 - under decommissioning | 4 | Unknown number of boats still in service for secondary tasks |
| Olympic D-44 | | Coastal Patrol | 13.4 | 25 | Greece | 1973 - under decommissioning | 3 | Unknown number of boats still in service for secondary tasks / ΛΣ-153 series |
| Wellcraft | | Coastal Patrol / HCG Special Forces | | | USA | 2004 | 1 | Donated by USCG 2004; Vessel ΛΣ-797 allocated to HCG's Seals |
| Madera MRCD-1250 | | Patrol RIB / HCG Special Forces | 12,5 | | The Netherlands | | 2 | Military grade boats for HCG's Seals; able to carry 10-12 troops each; armed with .50" gun and two 7.62mm machine guns; speed 49 knots |
| Fabio Buzzi MIL-40 | | Patrol / HCG Special Forces | 12.2 | 7 | Italy | 1997 | 2 | Vessels ΛΣ-132 and ΛΣ-133; Allocated to HCG's Special Forces (Ionian islands); Speed 50-55 knots |
| Magna Onda | | Patrol / HCG Special Forces | 11.7 | 5.4 | Greece | 1987 | 2 | Allocated to the HCG's Special Forces (Aegean islands); speed 52 knots |
| Halter Marine HSB | | Patrol / HCG Special Forces | 11.6 | | USA | 2004 | 1 | Donated by USCG 2004 |
| Fabio Buzzi MIL-38 | | Patrol / HCG Special Forces | 11.58 | 7 | Italy | 1997 | 2 | Vessels ΛΣ-129 and ΛΣ-130 allocated to HCG's Special Forces (Aegean islands); Speed 50-55 knots |
| Rafnar 1100 | | Patrol RIB / HCG Special Forces | 11,5 | 4 | GreeceIceland | 2020 | 10 | Donation from 'Union of Greek Shipowners'; Icelandic design, built by RAFNAR Hellas under licence; Vessels ΛΣ-1054 to ΛΣ-1063; speed 50+ knots |
| Naval Special Warfare (NSW) | | Patrol RIB / HCG Special Forces | 11 | 7.9 | USA | 2022 | 2 | Donated by US May 2022 - along with four more to Hellenic Navy; speed 45 knots |
| Magna 110 Hurricane Mk.I/II | | Patrol RIB / HCG Special Forces | 10,8 | | Greece | 2013 | 2 | ΛΣ-1002, ΛΣ-1005 |
| System 33/Nemesis RIB | | Patrol RIB / HCG Special Forces | 10.35 | | Greece | 2014 | 10 | All vessels donated by SNF; speed 50+ knots |
| Oceanic Interceptor | | Patrol RIB / HCG Special Forces | | | Greece | 2004 | ? | Allocated to HCG's Seals |
| Super Onda | | Patrol / HCG Special Forces | 8.6 | 2.8 | Greece | 1987 | 2 | Allocated to HCG's Special Forces (Aegean islands); speed 52 knots |
| Boston Whaler, Outrage-280 | | Patrol / HCG Special Forces | 8.34 | 3 | USA | 2004 | 3 | Allocated to HCG's Special Forces Piraeus; ΛΣ-798, ΛΣ-799 and ΛΣ-800; Donated by USCG 2004 |
| Gibli-1025 | | Coastal Patrol RIB | 10,25 | | Greece | 2001 | 12 | Vessels ΛΣ-3xx |
| Mostro Top Gun 964 | | Coastal Patrol RIB | 9.9 | 1.6 | Greece | 1997 | 8 | Vessels ΛΣ-2xx |
| Mostro Top Gun 864 | | Coastal Patrol RIB | 9.3 | 1.4 | Greece | 1992 | 11 | Vessels ΛΣ-2xx |
| Oceanic 9000 Stealth | | Coastal Patrol RIB | 9 | 2 | Greece | 1998 | 18 | Vessels ΛΣ-3xx |
| Magna 31 | | Coastal Patrol RIB | 8.6 | 2.8 | Greece | 2013 | 2 | ΛΣ-1003, ΛΣ-1004 |
| Viking Norsafe Munin S1200 Extended Cabin | | Ambulance Vessel | 12 | 7 | GreeceNorway | 2020 | 7/15 | Built by Viking Norsafe Hellas; Vessels ΛΣ-1064 to ΛΣ-1070 allocated to Greek islands; speed 40 knots |
| Lambro Halmatic 60 | | Lifeboat | 18 | 37 | Greece | 1999 | 10 | Vessels' series Ν/Γ-511 to Ν/Γ-520 |
| Arun Halmatic | | Lifeboat | 16 | 37 | United Kingdom | 1992 | 1 | Vessel Ν/Γ-510 |
| LMPA-29 | | Pollution control | 29 | 240 | Greece Spain | 1994 | 5 | Built by Motomarine, Greece; Designed by Astilleros Gondan, Spain; Vessels ΛΣ-413 to ΛΣ-417 |
| Pollcat | | Pollution control | 19 | 85 | Denmark United Kingdom | 1999 | 4 | Built by Manor Marine, Portland; designed by Desmi Denmark; Vessels ΛΣ-418 to ΛΣ-421 |
| BSK Skipper 38 Patrol | | Patrol Vessel | 12 | | Greece | 2024 | 1 | Built by BSK Marine, Koropi, Attica |

== Aircraft fleet ==
The Hellenic Coast Guard operates a small fleet of fixed wing aircraft based at Tatoi (Dekelia) Air Base, (LGTT, 38°06′35.1″N 23°46′55.5″E).

| Aircraft | Photo | ID | Type | Versions | Origin | Year acquired | In service | Notes |
|---|---|---|---|---|---|---|---|---|
| Eurocopter AS365 Dauphin | | HC-31 to HC-36 | Patrol helicopter | AS 365N3 | France | 2003 | 6 | Based at Kotroni Naval Air Station (LGKN) in cooperation with Hellenic Navy |
| Cessna 406 Caravan II | | AC-21 to AC-23 | Maritime patrol | F406 | France | 2000 | 3 | Built by Reims |
| Socata TB | | AC-3, AC-4 | Utility aircraft | TB 20 | France | 1985 | 2 | |
| Cessna 172 Skyhawk | | AC-1, AC-2 | Utility aircraft | 172RG | USA | 1981 | 2 | |
| IAI Heron 1 | | UC-01 | UAV | Heron 1 | Israel | 2022 | 1 | |

== HCG facilities ==
1. New headquarters and VTMIS operations centre (Pireaus): 37°56′33″N 23°37′35″E
2. Old headquarters and SAR coordination centre (Pireaus): 37°56′23.5″N 23°38′55″E
3. Mooring for Open Sea Patrol Vessels (Keratsini): 37°57′25.7″N 23°36′39.7″E
4. Coast Guard apron at Tatoi Air Base: 38°06′35.1″N 23°46′55.5″E
5. Aspropyrgos Maritime Communications Radio Station SXE: 38°02′12.5″N 23°35′7.5″E
6. Piraeus Central Port Authority: 37°56′23″N 23°38′24″E
7. Enlisted men training facility (Σχολή Λιμενοφυλάκων): 37°56′10.3″N 23°37′40.4″E
8. Piraeus VTMIS AIS receiver 002393200 37°56.369′N 023°38.381′E
9. Psyttaleia Island VTMIS AIS receiver 002391100 37°56.620′N 23°35.664′E
10. Patras VTS 38.24617°N 21.72886°E
11. Thessaloniki VTS 40.63802°N 22.92522°E
12. Corfu Island VTS 39.62708°N 19.90554°E
13. Igoumenitsa VTS 39.48799°N 20.25899°E
14. Lavrion VTS 37.71394°N 24.06252°E
15. Rafina Port 38°01.347′N 24°0.522′E
