= Spartans (Greek political party) =

Spartans Σπαρτιάτες
- President: Vasilis Stigkas
- Spokesperson: Korina Triantafyllou
- Founder: Vasilis Stigkas
- Founded: 5 December 2017; 8 years ago
- Split from: Radical National Rally
- Ideology: Neo-fascism; Ultranationalism; Ultraconservatism
- Political position: Far-right
- Religion: Church of Greece
- Colors: Gold; Red; Black
- Parliament: 2 / 300
- European Parliament: 0 / 21

Website
- spartiates.gr

Spartans (Greek: Σπαρτιάτες, romanized: Spartiátes) is a far-right political party in Greece, founded in 2017 by Vasilis Stigkas. It has strong connections with the neo-nazi party and criminal organization Golden Dawn.

On 12 June 2025, the party lost its parliamentary presence after the Special High Court expelled three of the party's five MPs for misleading voters.

== History ==
In the late 1980s, Vasilis Stigkas first joined New Democracy for a few years at the time when Konstantinos Mitsotakis was Prime Minister. Unsatisfied with the party, he followed then Foreign Minister Antonis Samaras into his new Political Spring party, after the latter was dismissed from his position over his stance on the Macedonia naming dispute.

In the early 2000s, Stigkas joined the LAOS party of Georgios Karatzaferis. He left after the party's support for the memorandum in 2012 while it participated in the coalition government of Lucas Papademos.

He created the Spartans party in 2017, while participating in political programs on the YouTube channel of Konstantinos Plevris and Tasos Simigdalas. During that time, he interviewed different political personalities such as leftist Panagiotis Lafazanis, centrist Vasilis Leventis and Golden Dawner Ioannis Lagos.

For the European parliamentary election of May 2019, an electoral alliance was announced with the party Union of Centrists of Vasilis Leventis. Stigkas received 752 votes nationwide. In the national legislative elections of 2019, Stigkas participated once more on the Boeotia ballot list of the Union of Centrists, receiving 35 votes.

In December 2020, the formation of a coalition was announced by ELASYN, the Popular Hellenic Patriotic Union (LEPEN), the "Spartans" party, the United Front of Greek Ideology of Compatriots (EMEIS) and the Front Line, with the prospect of a joint electoral descent with the name K.Y.M.A of Hellenism. In February 2021, the coalition announced the collaboration of the formation with the retired captain and chief of the Popular Citizens Movement (LAKIP) Andreas Petropoulos.

On 8 June 2023, the party Spartans was allowed to participate in the upcoming June 2023 Greek legislative election by the Supreme Court of Greece. Following the exclusion of the far-right National Party – Greeks of Ilias Kasidiaris from both the May and June 2023 elections, Kasidiaris announced his "full support" for the party of Stigkas. Subsequently, the party gained a 4.68% in the June 2023 Greek legislative election, winning a total of 12 seats in the new parliament.

The party gained significant traction in national polls in mid-June, following an endorsement on Twitter by Ilias Kasidiaris, a former Golden Dawn MP and nationalist politician who had been convicted in the trial declaring Golden Dawn to be a criminal organisation. Kasidiaris urged his supporters to vote for Spartans in the June 2023 election.

Given that many of its members of parliament have previously been associated with either Golden Dawn or Kasidiaris' party Greeks for the Fatherland, which was banned from participating in the 2023 elections, Spartans has been seen as a continuation of Golden Dawn. Some sources have even labelled it as Kasidiaris' "trojan horse".

Less than three months after the elections, three MPs were expelled from the parliamentary group by Stigkas, with the party's president citing their absence from the parliament as the reason for their expulsion. In early September, two more MPs became independent, leaving the party with 7 out of its original 12 seats. On 7 September, four of the newly independent MPs were reintegrated into the party's parliamentary group.

Since August 2023, a prolonged internal party crisis all but dissolved the Spartiate parliamentary group. The crisis erupted over the support of most of the party's MPs for Ilias Kasidiaris and his candidacy for the Municipality of Athens in the upcoming local elections. Party leader Vasilis Stigkas reacted to these initiatives by his MPs and expelled three of them, referring to MPs led by extra-parliamentary foreign centres acting like the Greek mafia. Stigkas' allegations prompted a judicial investigation by the Prosecutor of Greece’s Supreme Civil and Criminal Court, leading to the indictment of the entire parliamentary group—except Vasilis Stigkas—for electoral fraud, with Ilias Kasidiaris also charged for instigating the fraud. In May 2025, the Court of Appeal unanimously acquitted all 11 accused MPs, including Kasidiaris, finding no evidence that they had misled voters." On 27 May, the Appeals Prosecutor's Office filed an appeal against the first-instance decision, deeming its reasoning erroneous.

According to a decision by the Special Highest Court, Stigkas and two other Spartans MPs were stripped of their seats and ceased to be members of the Greek Parliament. This decision upheld a complaint by three voters that the three MPs were elected by misleading the electorate, concealing that their true leader and guide was Ilias Kasidiaris. Since the circumstances of the fraud did not allow the runners-up to replace the expelled MPs, Parliament was reduced to 297 seats for the remainder of the parliamentary term. The party's parliamentary group, now consisting of only two members, was dissolved on 12 June 2025, as it fell below the threshold of five MPs required to form a parliamentary group. The two MPs joined the Independents.

The party was barred from participating in the 2024 European Parliament elections, an action that was endorsed by New Democracy, PASOK, New Left and Syriza while it was rejected by Afroditi Latinopoulou and her Voice of Reason party.

== Ideology ==
The party is considered to be ultranationalist, ultraconservative, anti-LGBT/homophobic and positioned on the far-right of the political spectrum. The party describes itself as a supporter of the "popular patriotic right", of the triptych "homeland–religion–family" and of the "sane Greek nationalism".

The party takes a pro-Israel stance, strongly condemning the 2023 Hamas-led attack on Israel and criticising Turkey's alleged support for Hamas.

== Links with Ilias Kasidiaris and the National Party–Greeks ==
At least 10 members and politicians of the National Party – Greeks, including one of Kasidiaris' lawyers, were on the Spartans' ballot lists. Stigkas openly supported the National Popular Consciousness of convicted neo-Nazi Giannis Lagos, and later turned out to be a member of the National Party – Greeks. In May 2023 Greek legislative election, Spartans did not participate and were not involved in the discussion of the possible parties that Ilias Kasidiaris would support. After the second ban from the elections by the Supreme Court, Kasidiaris and members of his party openly supported Spartans. In his first public statement after the election, Stigkas openly thanked Kasidiaris for "[being] the fuel that has propelled us to [entering parliament]".

Faced with a surprise revolt in July 2023, the leader of the party Vasilis Stigkas encountered a situation in which nine members of parliament issued a statement against him. They cited unethical and unacceptable remarks made by MP Konstantinos Floros. Earlier in the day at the parliament, Floros had openly expressed his joy for the candidacy of the convicted leader of the criminal organization Golden Dawn in the municipality of Athens, Ilias Kasidiaris. The incident further solidified the perception that Kasidiaris functions as the de facto leader of the Spartans party.

== Electoral results ==
Spartans support in June 2023 election

=== Hellenic Parliament ===
Election	Leader	Votes	%	±pp	Seats	+/−	Rank	Government
2019	Vasilis Stigkas	70,178 (with Union of Centrists)	1.24	New	0 / 300	New	9th	Extra-parliamentary
June 2023	Vasilis Stigkas	243,922	4.68	+3.44	12 / 300	▲12	5th	Opposition

=== European Parliament ===
Election	Votes			Seats		EP Group
Election	#	%	Rank	#	±	EP Group
2019	750	1.45 (with Union of Centrists)	10th	0 / 21	New	−
