= 1992 Athens B by-election =

Greek election

The 1992 Athens B by-election was a parliamentary by-election held on 5 April 1992, for the Hellenic Parliament constituency of Athens B.

== Preceding events ==
Dimitris Tsovolas, then a PASOK MP for Athens B, was sentenced to a suspended prison term of 2.5 years by the Special Court (Ministers' Council) for the Koskotas scandal and to an additional penalty of deprivation of political rights (amounting to disfranchisement and disqualification) at which point he was removed from his parliamentary seat. In protest against what they considered to be the unfair trial and conviction of Tsovolas, the PASOK runners-up, who according to the Constitution would take his place, refused to be sworn in as MPs until their number (18) was exhausted. According to the law, by-elections were thus to be called for this one seat.

New Democracy, either to avoid being accused of further politicizing the trial and conviction of Tsovolas, i.e., that it sought his conviction in order to gain an additional seat in parliament (as it had a narrow majority of only 152 MPs), or to avoid a major defeat, decided not to participate in these elections. The Communist Party, Synaspismos, and Democratic Renewal also abstained from these elections.

With all major parliamentary parties essentially deciding not to disrupt the status quo, and let PASOK retain the seat, it was up to smaller parties to contest the by-election.

Participating alongside PASOK were the Union of Centrists, the National Political Union, Popular Unions of Non-Partisan Social Groups (with the tongue-in-cheek acronym ΛΕΥΚΟ, i.e. white/blank vote) and the Ecological Union.

The obvious runner up was the Union of Centrists, with its leader, Vasilis Leventis, standing in for the election. Leventis, who had a regional television channel in Attica (Channel 67, later Channel 40), had already created a sensational climate around his candidature with his phone-in show, attracting various attitudes during political rallies ranging from mocking, to an alleged assassination attempt in Kallithea during the election.

== Parties and candidates ==
The election was contested by 20 parties and 129 candidates, 94 of whom ran as independents.

Some of the candidates were:

- PASOK: Mangakis and Constantinos Papapanagiotou
- Union of Centrists: Leventis and George G. Papandreou (son of Georgios Papandreou, half-brother of Andreas Papandreou)
- EPEN: Dimopoulos Dimitrios and Spyros Zournatzis
- Popular Unions of Bipartisan Social Groups: Ntalios and Grigorakos Theodoros
- Ecological Union: Dimosthenis Vergis and Karadimos Haralambos
- Alternative Ecologists: Fountis Philippos
- Centre - Democratic Party of Greece: Lekatsas Panagiotis
- Party of "Humanity and Peace": Konstantopoulos Charalambis and Fotelis Nestor
- Democratic Party (DIKO): Anagnostou Christos and Stavropoulos Theodoros
- NP (New Politicians): Tzafos Christos and Sofianos Dimosthenes
- Toxotis (Archer): Pete Papadakos
- Human Rights Party: Levantis Antonios and Mpourlas Daniel
- Self-respect (Autosevasmos): Apostolakis Nikolaos
- EMA (Worker - Fighter for independents): Droulias Euthemios
- B - National Fighters': Delivorias Nikolaos and Tsitouras Constantinos
- ELEN (Hellenic Unity): Iliopoulos Angelos and Nounanakis Christos

== Results ==
Party	Votes	%
PASOK	397,721	67.71
Union of Centrists	114,492	19.49
National Political Union	24,985	4.25
Popular Unions of Bipartisan Social Groups	13,250	2.26
Ecological Union	8,401	1.43
Alternative Ecologists	6,914	1.18
Human Rights Party	6,181	1.05
Toxotis	2,515	0.43
Independents	1,677	0.29
A.S.K.E.	1,613	0.27
Ecologists of Greece	1,475	0.25
Self-respect	1,196	0.20
Democratic Party (DIKO)	1,045	0.18
Centre - Democratic Party of Greece	1,040	0.18
B - National Fighters'	989	0.17
EMA	981	0.17
Party of "Humanity and Peace"	875	0.15
NP (New Politicians)	841	0.14
ELEN (Hellenic Unity)	780	0.13
Vergina 1990	286	0.05
Movement of Responsible Citizens	110	0.02
Total	587,367	100.00
Valid votes	587,367	87.02
Invalid votes	44,875	6.65
Blank votes	42,703	6.33
Total votes	674,945	100.00
Registered voters/turnout	981,703	68.75

The seat was ultimately won by PASOK's Georgios-Alexandros Mangakis, by a large margin of 283,229 votes more than Leventis. Compared to the tally of PASOK ballots in Athens B during the previous election (293,068 votes), this was a 35.71% increase.

The result seemed equally redeeming for Leventis, who, having founded the party just a month earlier and having only garnered 3,360 votes nationally (under his previous party instance, Ecologists Pacifists Greens) in the 1990 parliamentary election, saw an increase of 3307.5% in his overall results; looking solely at Athens B, the increase was even more spectacular (Leventis having received only 553 votes in 1990): the 114,492 votes represented an uptick of 20,603.80%. This, however, can possibly be attributed to ND and other parties' voters voting for Leventis so that the seat would not go handily to PASOK.

Abstention reached 31,1%, as the compulsory voting provisions were not enforced for the by-election. 13% of all ballots cast were either blank or invalid votes. The Union of Centrists was first in Filothei, Ekali, Psychiko and Papagou. It's worth noting that Leventis was lynched after casting his vote.

== Aftermath ==
Newspapers close to PASOK would feature headlines like "Waterloo for ND" (Ethnos, April 6), "Go away (said the voters)" (Ta Nea, same day), ''Mitsotakis in panic" (Ethnos, April 7), while newspapers closer to ND (Apogevmatini, Kathimerini, Eleftheros Typos) interpreted the result as a protest vote against the government and castigated governmental inactivity, carrying frontpage headlines and subtitles like "Wake up, for heaven's sake, and change your mindset!" (Eleftheros Typos, 7/4), "Rescue mission: ND" (Kathimerini, 8/4) and "What's wrong and what should change" (Apogevmatini, (7/4).

Papandreou called for immediate elections, and Democratic Renewal interpreted the result as the "definitive condemnation of governmental policy". Ex-PM Georgios Rallis proposed the formation of a coalition government between ND and PASOK, as a possible solution to the political impasse.

=== Later developments ===
This tenure of Mangakis ultimately proved short, as in 1993 a snap election was called following the Mitsotakis-Samaras split and the subsequent loss of parliamentary majority.

In 1993, PASOK received 392,782 votes and came in first place in Athens B. As for Leventis and the Union of Centrists, the 1992 Athens B results were not replicated; he received a mere 4264 votes (0.5%) in Athens B and 15,926 (0.23%) on the national level. It was only in the September 2015 parliamentary election that the party was able to enter Parliament.

The 1992 by-election remains the only to date by-election in the history of the Third Hellenic Republic. The previous by-election was held in 1952.
