= List of active nationalist parties in Europe =

Nationalist parties in Europe have been on the rise since the early 2010s due to, according to some, austerity measures and immigration.

== Analyses ==
Linguist Ruth Wodak has stated that the populist parties rising across Europe do so for different reasons in different countries. In an article published in March 2014, she divided these political parties into four groups: "parties [which] gain support via an ambivalent relationship with fascist and Nazi pasts" (in, e.g., Austria, Hungary, Italy, Romania, and France), parties which "focus primarily on a perceived threat from Islam" (in, e.g., the Netherlands, Denmark, Poland, Sweden, and Switzerland), parties which "restrict their propaganda to a perceived threat to their national identities from ethnic minorities" (in, e.g., Hungary, Greece, Italy, and the United Kingdom), and parties which "endorse a fundamentalist Christian conservative-reactionary agenda" (in, e.g., Poland, Romania, and Bulgaria). According to The Economist, the main attraction of far-right parties in the Scandinavian countries is the perception that their national culture is under threat.

Different parts of Europe have nationalist parties with various ideologies and goals. Most nationalist parties in Central and Western Europe are described as "right-wing populists". According to Thomas Klau of the European Council on Foreign Relations "as antisemitism was a unifying factor for far-right parties in the 1910s, 20s and 30s, Islamophobia has become the unifying factor in the early decades of the 21st century." At the other side, there are non-rightist nationalist forces, many of them are leftist, civic or big-tent parties, which often advocate regionalism.

== Overview ==
There are several nationalist political parties of all kinds in Europe, with different cases among the countries.

In Cyprus, because of the complicated situation on the island nation, most of the political forces are described as nationalist but on a different perspective each: leftist-nationalist AKEL supports Cypriotism, social-democratic EDEK, green KOSP and centrist DIKO are Greek-Cypriot nationalist, while national-populist ELAM supports Hellenic nationalism and union with Hellas.

In Belarus (Belaya Rus) and in Azerbaijan (New Azerbaijan Party), the dominant ruling parties are also big-tent nationalist, while in Russia both the ruling big-tent party (United Russia) and the main opposition parties (leftist Communist Party and far-right LDPR) are nationalist. In Turkey, almost all the political parties, from centre-left to the far-right, are nationalist, including the government parties (conservative AK Party and MHP) and the main opposition (secularist CHP and İYİ).

Right-wing or far-right nationalist parties are the biggest party in Switzerland (Swiss People's Party) and the ruling party in Italy (Brothers of Italy, Lega), part of the government in Finland (Finns Party), while in Sweden (Swedish Democrats) and in Serbia (United Serbia) they support the government. Also, in North Macedonia, nationalist VMRO-DPMNE is one of the two major parties in the country. After years of opposition, the PVV in the Netherlands became the biggest party in parliament.

In the UK, Scotland's government is ruled by SNP, a catch-all and mostly social-democratic nationalist party that supports Scottish independence. In Spain, the centre-left government is supported by leftist nationalist ERC (Catalonia) and EH-Bildu (Basque) that seeking Catalan and Basque independence prospectively and also by the centrist nationalist and pro-Basque-independence BNP. In Norway (civic nationalist Centre Party) and in Cyprus (centrist DIKO, social-democratic EDEK), non-rightist nationalist parties are coalition partners on the governments. Also in Moldova, leftist nationalist PSRM is one of the two major political forces.

In all other countries, nationalist parties are in opposition. In some countries, opposition nationalist parties are major or significant players in politics, such as France's National Rally, United Kingdom's Reform UK, Germany's AfD, Spain's Vox, Greece's Hellenic Solution, Serbia's Oathkeepers and Dveri, Portugal's Chega, Netherlands' Forum for Democracy, Catalonia's (Esp) Junts and CUP, Ukraine's Batkivshchyna and Svoboda, Estonia's Conservative People's Party, Austria's Freedom Party, Bulgaria's Revival, Flanders' (Bel) Vlaams Belang and New Flemish Alliance, Hungary's Jobbik, Fidesz, and Our Homeland Movement, Czechia's SPD, Norway's Progress Party, Armenia's Revolutionary Federation, Wales' (UK) Plaid Cymru, Sprska's (B&H) Alliance of Independents Social Democrats, Slovakia's National Party, Republika and Smer, Slovenia's SDS, Cyprus' AKEL and ELAM, Denmark's People's Party, Ireland's Sinn Fein, Moldova's Şor, Croatia's Homeland Movement, Luxembourg's Alternative Democratic Reform, Bosnia's Party of Democratic Action, etc.

Separatist/regionalist nationalist parties with strong influence in the whole countries' politics are mentioned above, are ERC, Junts and CUP from Catalonia, Lega from Northern Italy, SNP from Scotland, Vlaams Belang and New Flemish Alliance from Flanders, Alliance of Independents Social Democrats from Sprska and Plaid Cymru from Wales. Also, there are some separatist nationalist parties with strong -or even majority- influence at local councils: Basqonian Geroa Bai from Navarre, Pe a Corsica from Corsica, Croatian Democratic Union from Croat-speaking Bosnia and Galician Nationalist Bloc from Galicia.

There are some cases, like Hellas's Golden Dawn, Slovakia's L'SNS, Croatia's Party of Rights or Germany's NPD, in which parties with significant role on the politics were ultra-nationalist and described as Neo-Nazi. Today, NPD is a minor extra-parliamentary party in Germany, Golden Dawn has eclipsed and condemned by the Hellenic Supreme Court as a criminal organization, Party of Rights is also almost eclipsed in Croatia, while L'SNS is still a parliamentary active political force in Slovakia. In Turkey, MHP is considered ultra-conservative and neo-fascist, with links to the racist organization "Grey Wolves". In Italy, governing Brothers of Italy has post-fascist roots, while some years earlier the political parties MSI and its successor National Alliance (neo-fascist and post-fascist prospectively) were major political forces. In Hellas, the parliamentary political party of Spartans, though not neonazi/neofascist itself, entered the Parliament because of the endorsement of National Party - Hellenes and its leader Ilias Kasidhiaris, an ex-leading member of the neonazi Golden Dawn. Also, parties like Ukraine's Svoboda or Russia's LDPR have described as alleged with neonazism and neofascism.

== Recent developments ==
=== Estonian general election, March 2019 ===
The Conservative People's Party of Estonia is an Estonian far-right political party, founded in 2012. During the 2019 Estonian parliamentary election it had the largest gain overall of all parties, increasing their seat count by 12 to a total of 19 seats. Its public support is on the rise, according to opinion polls.

=== Spanish general election, November 2019 ===
Vox is a Spanish right-wing to far-right political party, founded in 2012. It obtained, by surprise, 24 seats in the Spanish parliament in the April 2019 election. In the November 2019 election Vox obtained 52 seats (an increase) from what it got in early 2019. The president of Vox is Santiago Abascal and its general secretary is Javier Ortega Smith. Its public support was on the rise, according to results of subsequent regional elections, and opinion polls, but it has since stabilized below 15% of the popular vote.

=== Hungarian parliamentary elections, 3 April 2022 ===
Hungary held its general parliamentary elections on 3 April 2022, where 199 seats in the National Assembly of Hungary were filled. Two nationalist parties, emerged with seats in the new Assembly, with the new Prime Minister, Viktor Orban, being from the Fidesz-Christian Democratic People's Party. His party gained 135 seats, while the Our Homeland Movement gained 7 seats. This put 142 out of 199 seats in the Hungarian National Assembly under the control of nationalist parties..

=== Swedish general elections, 11 September 2022 ===
Sweden held its 2022 Swedish general election on 11 September 2022, where 349 seats in the Riksdag were filled. Sweden Democrats Sweden's far-right political party made gains winning 73 seats and becoming the 2nd largest party in Sweden with 20.07%. After the election Sweden Democrats joined the government.

They had two minor nationalist parties run also: Alternative for Sweden and Swedish Resistance Movement. However, they got a small percentage of the vote.

=== Italian general elections, 25 September 2022 ===
Italy held its general elections on 25 September 2022, where 400 deputies were elected to the lower house and 200 senators to the upper house of the Italian parliament. Italy's second largest right-wing party, the Lega Nord or "League" secured 66 seats in the Chamber of Deputies (lower house) and 30 seats in the Senate (upper house). The Brothers of Italy, the largest nationalist right-wing party today, obtained 119 seats in the Chamber of Deputies and 65 seats in the Senate.

Observers commented that the results shifted the geopolitics of the European Union, following far-right gains in France, Spain, and Sweden. It was also noted that the election outcome would mark Italy's first far-right-led government and the country's most right-wing government since 1945.

=== Finnish general elections, 2 April 2023 ===
Finland held its general elections, 2 April 2023, where 200 seats in the Eduskunta were elected to the lower house. Finland's largest far-right party, the Finns Party secured 46 seats in the parliament, it was the second largest party with 20.07% of the vote.

They had two minor parties run also: Blue-and-Black Movement and Finnish People First; but they got only a small percentage of the votes.

=== Hellenic election, 2023 ===
On the Hellenic Parliamentary elections in June 2023, far-right nationalist party Spartans entered the Parliament gaining 12/300 MP seats and around 4.5% of the popular vote. Two parties often described by some as nationalist also entered the Parliament: national-conservative Hellenic Solution gained 12/300 seats and around 4.5% of the popular vote, while christian-nationalist party Victory gained 10/300 sets with popular vote around 3.5%. Finally, Course of Freedom, an anti-establishment party which is described by some as left-wing nationalist, gained 3% of the popular vote and 8/300 seats. Totally, there are 12/300 (4%) seats belonging to a clearly far-right nationalist party, while by adding the seats of parties that sometimes described as nationalist, a total number of 42/300 (14%) of the Parliament MPs.

Prior to the election, there was an increasing coiling around National Party – Hellenes and its leader Ilias Kasidhiaris. Kasidhiaris, a former leading member of neonazi Golden Dawn party, tried to present a party with modern nationalist far-right profile, managing to reach around 5% in 2023 polls. Finally, a law that exclude political parties connected to individuals sentenced as part of criminal organizations (Kasidhiaris is sentenced as leading person of Golden Dawn and serves his sentence on prison), did not allow at the party to take part on the election. Kasidiaris and his party, endorsed Spartans party, so it managed to enter the Parliament.

== List ==
- the governing party
- giving parliamentary support

=== National ===
Country	Party	Date established	% of popular vote	Votes	Seats	Ideology, description	European party
Albania	Albanian National Front Party	1989			0 / 140	Albanian nationalism, national conservatism, Greater Albania	
Armenia	Armenian Revolutionary Federation	1890	21.11% (2021)	269,481	7 / 105	Armenian nationalism, United Armenia	PES
Armenia	Republican Party of Armenia	1990	5.22% (2021)	66,650	4 / 105	Armenian nationalism, national conservatism, Tseghakronism, Russophilia	EPP
Austria	Freedom Party of Austria	1956	28.90% (2024)	1,403,497	57 / 183	National conservatism, right-wing populism, anti-immigration, euroscepticism	ID
Belgium	New Flemish Alliance	2001	16.71% (2024)	1,167,061	24 / 150	Flemish nationalism, Regionalism, Separatism, Conservatism, Liberal conservatism, Republicanism	EFA
Belgium	Vlaams Belang	2004	13.77% (2024)	961,601	20 / 150	Flemish nationalism Right-wing populism Separatism; National conservatism Euroscepticism	ID
Bulgaria	IMRO – Bulgarian National Movement	1999			0 / 240	Bulgarian nationalism, national conservatism, traditionalism	
Bulgaria	National Front for the Salvation of Bulgaria	2011			0 / 240	Bulgarian nationalism, national conservatism, Euroscepticism	
Bulgaria	Attack	2005			0 / 240	Bulgarian nationalism, ultranationalism,	
Bulgaria	Bulgarian National Union – New Democracy	2014	0.10 (2024)	2,163	0 / 240	National Socialism, Ultranationalism	
Bulgaria	Revival (Bulgarian political party)	2014	13.78% (2024)	295,915	38 / 240	Bulgarian nationalism, national conservatism, Euroscepticism, anti-Western.	ESN
Croatia	Homeland Movement	2020	9.56% (2024)	202,714	14 / 151	Croatian nationalism, right-wing populism, national conservatism, social conservatism, conservatism, soft Euroscepticism	
Croatia	Croatian Party of Rights	1990	0.85% (2024)	18,128	0 / 151	Croatian nationalism	
Cyprus	National Popular Front	2008	10.90% (2026)	40,567	8 / 56	Greek nationalism	
Czech Republic	Freedom and Direct Democracy	2015	9.56% (2021)	513,900	20 / 200	Czech nationalism, Anti-immigrant, Anti-Muslim Eurosceptism	ESN
Denmark	Danish People's Party	1995	9.10% (2026)	324,702	16 / 179	National conservatism, Danish nationalism, anti-immigration, Euroscepticism	ID
Estonia	Conservative People's Party of Estonia	2012	17.8% (2019)	99,672	19 / 101	Estonian nationalism, national conservatism, anti-immigration, Euroscepticism, Ethnopluralism	ID
Finland	Finns Party	1995	20.07% (2023)	620,102	46 / 200	Finnish nationalism, Anti-Immigration, Euroscepticism	AECR
France	National Rally	1972	29.26% (2024)	9,379,092	125 / 577	French nationalism, Anti-Immigration, Euroscepticism	PFE
France	Reconquête	2021	0.79% (2024)	266,088	0 / 577	French nationalism, Anti-Immigration, Euroscepticism	ESN
Georgia	Georgian Dream	2012	53.94% (2024)	1,120,140	89 / 150	Georgian nationalism, Social conservatism, Euroscepticism, Anti-LGBT, Anti-Immigration	
Georgia	Alliance of Patriots of Georgia	2012	2.44% (2024)	50,596	0 / 150	Georgian nationalism, Social conservatism, Euroscepticism, Anti-LGBT, Anti-Immigration	
Germany	Alternative for Germany	2013	20.8% (2025)	10,327,148	151 / 736	Euroscepticism, national conservatism	ESN
Germany	National Democratic Party	1964	0.1% (2021)	64,574	0 / 736	German nationalism, Neo-nazism	APF
Greece	Course of Freedom	2016	3.17% (2023)	165,310	8 / 300	Left-wing nationalism, Sovereigntism, Anti-austerity, Left-wing populism, Progressivism, Euroscepticism	
Greece	Democratic Patriotic Movement - Victory	2019	3.69% (2023)	192,239	10 / 300	Religious conservatism, Christian nationalism	
Greece	Golden Dawn	1993	not able to contest, cancelled by Supreme Court		0 / 300	Greek nationalism, Anti-immigration, Irredintism, Ultranationalism, Neo-fascist, Neo-nazism	
Greece	Greek Solution	2016	4.45% (2023)	262,218	12 / 300	National conservatism, Greek nationalism, economic nationalism, Euroscepticism, anti-immigration, right-wing populism	AECR
Greece	National Party - Hellenes	2020	not able to contest, cancelled by Supreme Court		0 / 300	Greek nationalism, Ultranationalism, Anti-immigration, Nativism	
Greece	Spartans	2017	4.68% (2023)	243,922	12 / 300	Greek nationalism, Ultranationalism, Anti-immigration, Conservatism, Euroscepticism	
Hungary	Fidesz	1988	39.60% (2026)	2,458,337	57 / 199	Hungarian nationalism, national conservatism, anti-immigration, right-wing populism	ID
Hungary	Our Homeland Movement	2018	6.18% (2026)	358,372	7 / 199	Hungarian nationalism, anti-immigration, Hungarian irredentism	ESN
Ireland	Irish Freedom Party	2018	0.6% (2024)	14,838	0 / 160	Hard Euroscepticism, Irish nationalism	
Ireland	National Party	2016	0.3% (2024)	6,511	0 / 166	Nationalism, Anti-immigration, Anti-Islam	
Italy	Brothers of Italy	2012	26.0% (2022)	7,284,952	118 / 400	National conservatism, Right-wing populism	AECR
Italy	League	1991	8.7% (2022)	2,458,752	66 / 400	Right-wing populism, Sovereigntism, Conservatism	ID
Latvia	National Alliance	2010	9.40% (2022)	84,939	13 / 100	Latvian nationalism	AECR
Latvia	Latvian Nationalists	2018	0.50% (2018)	4,245	0 / 100	Latvian nationalism	
Lithuania	Young Lithuania	2009			0 / 141	Lithuanian nationalism, national conservatism, protectionism	
Luxembourg	Alternative Democratic Reform Party	1987	9.27% (2023)	348,990	5 / 60	conservatism	AECR
Malta	Moviment Patrijotti Maltin	2016	0.36% (2017)	1,117	0 / 67	Maltese nationalism, right-wing populism, anti-immigration, anti-Islam	
Malta	Imperium Europa	2000	3.17% (2019)	1,117	0 / 67	Maltese nationalism, Pan-European nationalism, anti-immigration, anti-Zionism	
Netherlands	Party for Freedom	2006	16.66% (2025)	1,760,966	26 / 150	Anti-immigration, Anti-Islam, Euroscepticism	ID
Netherlands	JA21	2020	6.00% (2025)	628,517	9 / 150	Anti-immigration, national conservatism, Euroscepticism	
Netherlands	Forum for Democracy	2016	4.54% (2025)	480,393	7 / 150	Anti-immigration, national conservatism, Euroscepticism	ESN
North Macedonia	VMRO-DPMNE	1990	44.54% (2024)	436,036	58 / 120	Macedonian nationalism, Christian democracy, National conservatism	EPP
Norway	Progress Party	1973	23.87% (2025)	734,779	48 / 169	Right-wing populism, Conservative liberalism, Anti-immigration, Euroscepticism	
Norway	Norway Democrats	2002	0.7% (2025)	22,281	0 / 169	Norwegian nationalism, Anti-immigration, Euroscepticism	
Poland	United Right	2015	35.4% (2023)	7,640,854	191 / 460	National conservatism, Christian democracy, soft euroscepticism	AECR
Poland	Law and Justice	2001	part of United Right alliance		161 / 460	Christian democracy, Soft Euroscepticism, Economic Nationalism	AECR
Poland	Confederation Liberty and Independence	2018	7.16% (2023)	1,547,364	18 / 460	Hard Euroscepticism, Polish Nationalism, Ordoliberalism	
Poland	National Movement	2012	part of Confederation alliance		5 / 460	Polish nationalism, national conservatism, anti-globalization	ID
Portugal	Rise Up	2000	0.15% (2025)	9,190	0 / 230	Portuguese nationalism, Hard Euroscepticism	AENM
Portugal	Chega	2019	22.76% (2025)	1,437,881	60 / 230	Portuguese nationalism, national conservatism	ID
Romania	Greater Romania Party	1991	0.55% (2020)	32,654	0 / 329	Romanian nationalism, Union with Moldova, Anti-Hungarian sentiment	
Romania	Alliance for the Union of Romanians	2019	18.50% (2024)	1,565,767	31 / 329	Revolutionary nationalism, Conservatism, Christian right, Right-wing populism, Anti-communism, Sovereigntism	AECR
Romania	S.O.S. Romania	2021	7.59% (2024)	642,253	0 / 329	Romanian nationalism, Romanian irredentism, Social conservatism, Right-wing populism, Hard Euroscepticism, Russophilia	
Russia	LDPR	1991	9.01% (2026)	5,970,578	23 / 450	Russian nationalism, Russian imperialism, anti-Americanism	
Serbia	Serbian People's Party	2014	part of Together We Can Do Everything alliance		2 / 250	Serbian nationalism, right-wing populism, national conservatism	
Serbia	Serbian Party Oathkeepers	2012	2.83% (2023)	105,165	0 / 250	Serbian nationalism, right-wing populism, Euroscepticism, national conservatism, social conservatism, Russophilia	
Serbia	Dveri	1999	2.83% (2023)	105,165	0 / 250	Serbian nationalism, Right-wing populism, Christian right, Conservatism, Monarchism, Economic nationalism, Eco-nationalism, Euroscepticism	
Serbia	Serbian Radical Party	1991	2.23% (2022)	80,218	0 / 250	Serbian nationalism, Serbian irredentism, right-wing populism, Hard Euroscepticism, national conservatism, Russophilia	
Slovakia	Slovak National Party	1989	5.63% (2023)	166,995	10 / 150	Slovak ultra-nationalist, Antiziganism	MELD
Slovakia	Kotleba - People's Party Our Slovakia	2011	0.84% (2023)	25,003	0 / 150	Neo-fascism	APF
Slovakia	Republic Movement	2021	4.75% (2023)	141,099	0 / 150	Neo-fascism	ESN
Slovenia	Slovenian Democratic Party	1989	23.5 (2022)	279,897	27 / 90	Slovenian nationalism, national conservatism, right-wing populism, social conservatism	EPP
Slovenia	Slovenian National Party	1991	2.24% (2026)	26,375	0 / 90	Slovenian nationalism	
Spain	Vox	2013	12.4% (2023)	3,057,000	33 / 350	Spanish nationalism, national conservatism	ID
Spain	Spanish Falange of the JONS	1976	0.02% (2023)	4,683	0 / 350	Falangism	
Sweden	Sweden Democrats	1988	20.5% (2022)	1,322,214	73 / 349	Swedish nationalism, Anti-immigration, Right-wing populism, Euroscepticism	AECR
Sweden	Alternative for Sweden	2018	0.39% (2026)	26,729	0 / 349	Swedish nationalism, Anti-immigration, Euroscepticism	
Sweden	Swedish Resistance Movement	1997	0.03% (2018)	2,106	0 / 349	Militant national socialist (part of the Nordic Resistance Movement)	
Sweden	Örebro Party	2014	-	-	0 / 349	Swedish nationalism, Populism	
Switzerland	Swiss People's Party	1971	27.93% (2023)	713,471	62 / 200	National conservatism, Economic liberalism, Agrarianism, Euroscepticism	
Ukraine	Right Sector	2014	2.15% (2019)	315,568	0 / 450	Ukrainian nationalism	
Ukraine	Svoboda	1991	2.15% (2019)	315,568	1 / 450	Ukrainian nationalism, Anti-Russian	
Ukraine	Congress of Ukrainian Nationalists	1992	2.15% (2019)	315,568	0 / 450	Ukrainian nationalism	
United Kingdom	Reform UK	2018	14.3% (2024)	4,117,610	8 / 650	Euroscepticism, British nationalism, Anti-immigration	

=== Disputed ===
Party	Country	Date established	% of popular vote (legislature)	Votes (legislature)	Seats	Ideology
Peace to Luhansk region	Luhansk People's Republic	2014	74.12% (2018)		37 / 50	Russian nationalism, Luhansk separatism
Donetsk Republic	Donetsk People's Republic	2005	72.38% (2018)		74 / 100	Russian nationalism, Donbass separatism
Unity Party	South Ossetia	2003	46.3% (2009)	21,246	17 / 34	Ossetia
National Unity Party	Northern Cyprus	1975	44.1% (2009)	622,804	27 / 50	Turkish nationalism
Vetëvendosje	Kosovo	2005	26.27% (2019)	221,001	29 / 120	Albanian Nationalism & Greater Albania
Obnovlenie	Pridnestrovia	2000	% (2025)	??	33 / 33	Centrism, Russian Nationalism
United Abkhazia	Abkhazia	2004	% (2012)		3 / 35	Republicanism

=== Regional ===
Party	Country	Date established	% of popular vote (legislature)	Votes (legislature)	Seats	Ideology	Euro- pean party
Basque National Party	(Spain) Basque Autonomous Community	1895	34.8% (2024)	372,456	27 / 75	Basque nationalism	
Geroa Bai (Basque National Party + other minor parties)	(Spain) Navarre	2011	13.24% (2023)	43,660	7 / 50	Basque nationalism	
EH Bildu	(Spain) Basque Autonomous Community (Spain) Navarre	2011	32.1% (2024) 17.14% (2023)	343,609 56,535	18 / 75 9 / 50	Basque nationalism Basque Country independence	
Together for Catalonia	(Spain) Catalonia	2020	21.59% (2024)	681,470	35 / 135	Catalan independence Liberalism	
Republican Left of Catalonia	(Spain) Catalonia	1931	13.66% (2024)	431,128	20 / 135	Catalan independence Social democracy	
Popular Unity Candidacy	(Spain) Catalonia	1991	4.09% (2024)	129,059	4 / 135	Catalan independence Anti-capitalism	
Catalan Alliance	(Spain) Catalonia	2020	3.79% (2024)	118,302	2 / 135	Catalan independence Right-wing populism Islamophobia	
Galician Nationalist Bloc	(Spain) Galicia	1982	31,34% (2024)	470,692	25 / 75	Galician nationalism Galician independence movement	
Chunta Aragonesista	(Spain) Aragon	1986	5.10% (2023)	34,163	3 / 67	Aragonese nationalism	
Coalició Compromís	(Spain) Valencia	2010	14.51% (2023)	357,989	25 / 75	Valencian nationalism	
Adelante Andalucía (2021)	(Spain) Andalusia	2021	4.58% (2022)	167,970	2 / 109	Andalusian nationalism	
Canarian Coalition	(Spain) Canary Islands	2005	22.08% (2023)	201,401	19 / 70	Canarian nationalism	
New Canaries	(Spain) Canary Islands	2005	8.1% (2023)	71,021	7 / 70	Canarian nationalism Social Democracy	
New Flemish Alliance	(Belgium) Flanders	2001	23.88% (2024)	1,045,950	31 / 124	Flemish nationalism Regionalism; Separatism; Conservatism; Liberal conservatism Republicanism	
Flemish Interest	(Belgium) Flanders	2004	22.66% (2024)	992,504	31 / 124	Flemish nationalism Right-wing populism Separatism; National conservatism Euroscepticism; Republicanism	ID
Pè a Corsica	(France) Corsica	2002	45.4% (2017) (54.5% in second round)	54,212 (67,253 in second round)	32 / 63	Corsican nationalism	
Martinican Independence Movement	(France) Martinique	2002	30.3% (2015) (54.1% in second round)	36,523 (83,541 in second round)	33 / 51	Martinican nationalism	
Scottish National Party	(United Kingdom) Scotland	1934	44.1% (2016) (Constituency vote: 46.5%) (Regional vote: 41.7%)	2,013,484 (Constituency vote: 1,059,897) (Regional vote: 953,587)	63 / 129	Scottish independence Scottish nationalism Regionalism	
Plaid Cymru	(United Kingdom) Wales	1925	20.7% (2016) (Constituency vote: 20.5%) (Regional vote: 20.8%)	420,924 (Constituency vote: 209,376) (Regional vote: 211,548)	12 / 60	Welsh nationalism Welsh independence Civil nationalism Regionalism	
Sinn Féin	Northern Ireland	1905	29.0% (2022)	250,388	27 / 90	Irish republicanism, Left-wing nationalism	
Party of Democratic Action	Federation of Bosnia and Herzegovina	1990	24.4% (2022)	238,111	26 / 98	Bosniak nationalism	
Croatian Democratic Union	Federation of Bosnia and Herzegovina	1990	13.3% (2022)	130,567	15 / 98	Croatian nationalism	
Alliance of Independent Social Democrats	(Bosnia and Herzegovina) Republika Srpska	1996	34.6% (2022)	221,554	29 / 83	Serbian nationalism	
Alliance of Vojvodina Hungarians	(Serbia) Vojvodina	1994	9.29% (2020)	75,218	11 / 120	Hungarian nationalism	

== European political parties with mainly nationalist parties ==
=== Currently active ===
- Alliance for Peace and Freedom (2014–present)
- Europe of Sovereign Nations (ESN, 2024–present)
- Patriots.eu (ID, 2014–present)
- European Conservatives and Reformists Party (ECR, 2009–present)

=== Defunct parties ===
- Alliance of European National Movements (2009-2019?)
- European National Front (2004–2009)
- Euronat (1997-2009)
- Movement for a Europe of Liberties and Democracy (2011-2015)
- Alliance of Independent Democrats in Europe (2005-2008)
- Alliance for Europe of the Nations (2002-2009)

=== Separatist/regionalist ===
- European Free Alliance (1981–present)

There are not European political parties with left-wing nationalist or civic nationalist ideology, though there are individual national parties.

== First Parliament entry chronology ==
The table below lists in chronological order the dates when the parties first entered into their respective national parliament; they have each been in parliament since.

Entered Parliament	Party name		Country
1998	Danish People's Party	DF	Denmark
1999	Finns Party	PS	Finland
2006	Party for Freedom	PVV	Netherlands
2007	Vlaams Belang	VB	Belgium
2010	Sweden Democrats	SD	Sweden
2012	National Rally	RN	France
2013	Brothers of Italy	FdI	Italy
2015	Conservative People's Party of Estonia	EKRE	Estonia
2017	Forum for Democracy	FvD	Netherlands
2017	Alternative for Germany	AfD	Germany
2017	Freedom and Direct Democracy	SPD	Czech Republic
2019	Vox	VOX	Spain
2019	Chega	CH	Portugal
2022	Our Homeland Movement	MHM	Hungary

== Sources ==
- Geden, Oliver (2006). Diskursstrategien im Rechtspopulismus: Freiheitliche Partei Österreichs und Schweizerische Volkspartei zwischen Opposition und Regierungsbeteiligung. VS Verlag. ISBN 978-3-531-15127-4.
- Skenderovic, Damir (2009). The radical right in Switzerland: continuity and change, 1945-2000. Berghahn Books. ISBN 978-1-84545-580-4.
