= Renos Apostolidis =

Greek writer, philologist and literary critic

- Ρένος Αποστολίδης
- Born: March 2, 1924; Athens, Kingdom of Greece
- Died: March 10, 2004 (aged 80); Athens, Greece
- Occupations: Writer, philologist, literary critic
- Children: Erkos Apostolides; Stantes Apostolides
- Parent(s): Iraklis Apostolidis; Elpinike Zampele

Renos Apostolidis (Greek: Ρένος Αποστολίδης; 2 March 1924 – 10 March 2004) was a Greek writer, philologist and literary critic.

His father was Heracles N. Apostolidis, a notable journalist and director of the National Library between 1945 and 1959. His mother Elpiniki (née Zambeli) was a teacher.

== Early life ==
Apostolidis was born in Athens in 1924. His father was Heracles N. Apostolidis, who was a journalist, chief editor in several newspaper agencies, head of Encyclopaedia of Pyrsos publishing, head of the National Library (1945–1959) and creator of the first greek Poetry and Short Stories Anthology. His mother, Elpiniki, was a teacher. After primary school, he attended Varvakeios High School (1935–1941), where on 28 October 1941 he organized a student protest. Apostolidis participated in the march on 3 December 1944 with EAM followers that was banned by the Papandreou government,. From 1945, Apostolidis studied in the department of History and Archaeology of the University of Athens, but was forced to suspend his studies in order to pay his duties in the Greek Army during the Civil War, where he participated as Second lieutenant of the National Army. Living so close with destruction and death, Apostolidis stated that he swore to himself not to shoot a single bullet, and to record what he was going through for two and a half years in Grammos, Vitsi and during the cleansing operations of Roumeli and the Peloponnese. As soon as he was released from his duties, he published Pyramid 67, a novel about the Civil War. He was initially dismissed as an author, labeled a "second rank nationalist".

In 1950 he completed his studies and started teaching Ancient and Modern Greek, History and Latin in private high schools of Athens. He emerged as a writer in 1944, with the publishing of the essay "Time of Being" in Grammata periodical. A year later, he issued his first essay collection Three stations in a Course. He collaborated with several newspapers and periodicals of Athens as an editor of Eleutheria, Niki, Eikones, Gnoseis, Neoteron Lexicon Iliou, Aneksartitos Typos and other publications, as well as book critic in Grammata, Fititiki Foni, Deltion tou Vivliou, Kiklos, Kochlias, Nea Estia, Neoi Rithmoi, Nees Ikones, Ethnos, Ethnikos Kirikas, Epoptia and Nea Koinoniologia.

Starting in 1951, he worked as chief editor and critic in the periodical Our Aeon, and in 1952, established with his father the periodical Modern Greek. In the latter he exercised intense criticism "against the political and literary establishment", and particularly against the "Generation of the '30s", accusing them of "spiritual and ethical inadequacy". For this posture of him, author M. Karagatsis sued him and his father for reasons of copyright.

In 1966 Apostolidis started publishing in Modern Greek serialised fragments from the diary of Ioannis Metaxas accompanied with his own sarcastic commentary. These publishes caused the reaction of the newly established organisation 4th of August Party, and its leader Konstantinos Pleuris, who attacked Apostolidis from the organisation's newspaper. After Apostolidis's response Pleuris filed a lawsuit against him. The trial took place after the Coup of 21 April 1967, and the establishment of military dictatorship, and so the circulation of Modern Greek stopped, which until then had published five articles related to the first two volumes of Metaxas's diary. Apostolidis lost the trial in the first instance court, but in the Court of Appeal he stated that it was not his intention to offend the members of the 4th of August Party and the lawsuit was dismissed.

== Politics ==
From 1962 to 1964, Apostolidis served as a collaborator with the Directorate-General of the National Radio Foundation. In the parliamentary elections of 1963 he ran as a candidate under Spyridon Markezinis, while already since 1961 had written for the periodical of the youth of the Progressive party. In the local elections of 1964 he ran as a candidate for municipal consultant in Athens's municipality in the line up of Georgios Plytas. In 1964, Apostolidis was the head of an wrathful crowd of far right dissidents who entered the Parliament with the slogan Traitor Papandreou, Karamanlis, Papandreou Fraud. The crowd fought with parliament members of the center, an act for which Apostolidis was arrested and sentenced to two and a half years in prison, serving three months in total.

=== Dictatorship ===
During the dictatorship in Greece, in 1969, Prime Minister Georgios Papadopoulos imposed issue of the Short stories Anthology of Heracles N. Apostolidis in the Athenian Press, under the condition of not being censored. In this way texts belonging to dissidents were published like those of the politically exiled Demetris Hantzis. However, the publication in two newspapers part of Renos Apostolidis's novella The A2, written in 1968 about the Greek Civil War, provoked the intervention of censorship and the suspension of the publishing after direct interference of Ioannis Ladas, the general secretary of the Ministry of Public Order and one of the orchestrators of the 1967 coup d'état.

=== Later years ===
After the end of the dictatorship, until 1979, Apostolidis continued writing critiques in the quarterly periodical Tetramina and published several of his works. In his later years he published lectures and appeared on television for matters regarding the Greek language, education and literature. He was also honorary guest in presentations of his works. He was a supporter of the polytonic writing system, the historical Greek orthography and the teaching of ancient Greek from the original text in schools.

== Death ==
Apostolidis died on 10 March 2004 after suffering an acute stroke. He received a non-religious burial, due to him being agnostic.

== Works ==
Renos Apostolidis was a prolific writer. During his lifetime he published over 30 books.

His first published work was Three Stations in a Course (1945). Some of his most famous works are Wings of The Stork (1949), Poet Letters (1949), Pyramid 67 (1950), Modern Greek (Periodical) (1952, 1957, 1966–1967), The Greaser and The Manuscripts of Max Tod (1960), A Criticism of the Postwar Period (1962), Axes (1979), The Furies (1980), Cats (1989), and The Vortex (1993). One book, Alpha Centauri was published posthumously, in 2012.
