= National Party – Greeks =

Greek political party

National Party – Greeks Εθνικό Kόμμα – Έλληνες
- President: Dimitris Chatziliadis
- Founder: Ilias Kasidiaris
- Founded: 4 June 2020
- Dissolved: 12 January 2025
- Split from: Golden Dawn
- Headquarters: Klisthenous 17, Athens
- Youth wing: Hellenes Youth
- Ideology: Neo-fascism; Greek nationalism Anti-immigration; Islamophobia; Nativism
- Political position: Far-right
- Religion: Greek Orthodox Church
- Colours: Blue
- Regional councillors: 2 / 611
- Municipal councillors: 0 / 8.481

Election symbol
- Hoplite

Website
- ellhnes.net

National Party – Greeks (Greek: Εθνικό Kόμμα – Έλληνες, romanized: Ethnikó Kómma – Éllines), formerly Greeks for the Fatherland (Greek: Έλληνες για την Πατρίδα, romanized: Éllines gia tin Patrída), was a Greek far-right neo-fascist political party founded on 4 June 2020, by Ilias Kasidiaris, a former MP and spokesperson of Golden Dawn, who until 2026 was serving a prison term for his involvement in the criminal organisation run by Golden Dawn, allegations for which he maintains his innocence.

== History ==
Former party logo

After Golden Dawn's failure to secure seats in the 2019 Greek legislative election, prominent members of the party stepped down from their positions and distanced themselves from leader Nikolaos Michaloliakos. Noticeably, Giannis Lagos MEP announced his departure from Golden Dawn, along with Giorgos Germenis, Nikos Kouzilos and Panagiotis Iliopoulos to start a new party called National Popular Consciousness. All of them were later sentenced to lengthy prison terms as a result of their involvement in running a criminal organisation.

Similarly, on 21 May 2020 and after much speculation, Ilias Kasidiaris an MP of Golden Dawn for eight consecutive years, from 2012 to 2019, announced his resignation via YouTube, and the creation of a new party led by himself, under the name Greeks for the Fatherland. However, he was arrested in October 2020 right after the announcement of his conviction.

In May 2021, the Greek Parliament voted to impose partial bans on all convicted members of Golden Dawn, including Ilias Kasidiaris, which stripped them of some political rights.

As of 2022, Kasidiaris remains in prison and maintains his right to be elected as party member, but is not allowed to stand for leader of a party. Former Golden Dawn MP Konstantinos Barbarousis, who is also serving his prison sentence, and former Golden Dawn MEP Lampros Fountoulis have joined the party. Ioannis Malandris, former general secretary and many other former members of the "Patriotic Radical Union" party joined Kasidiaris party in 2022. In December 2022, the joint descent to the 2023 elections with the National Front and LEPEN was announced.

In March 2023, the cooperation with EAN of the former deputy prosecutor Anastasios Kanellopoulos was announced, who took over as head of the National Party – Greeks in the position of the political Council of the party.

On 1 April 2023, it was announced that the cooperation of the National Front with the National Party would end due to the ban on Ilias Kasidiaris stepping down as president.

Following the exclusion of the National Party from both the May and June 2023 elections, Kasidiaris announced its "full support" for the Spartans political party. The Spartans party won 12 seats in the elections. In his first public statement after the election, Stigkas openly thanked Kasidiaris for "[being] the fuel that has propelled us to [entering parliament]".

== Ideology ==
In its official website, the party states it aims at reverting the demographic decline, develop the Greek national economy and that it favors anti-immigration. The original logo was heavily inspired by the League from Italy replacing the Monument to the Warrior of Legnano with a statue of Leonidas I.

The party has not openly embraced neo-Nazism and Kasidiaris' statement in 2020 rejected Nazism. However, being an offspring of Golden Dawn, the party appears to share similar views with its core ideology, mainly in terms of ultra-nationalism, anti-immigration, Islamophobia and rejection of globalization. As a consequence, its political ideology is being questioned in relation to the past events and recent split from Golden Dawn and some academics, Greek and International media have described Greeks for the Fatherland as extremist and far-right. The party is person-centric with Ilias Kasidiaris being the leading voice.

A member of Greeks of the Fatherland is associated with the fringe antivax group Thematofylakes tou Syntagmatos (Greek: Θεματοφύλακες του Συντάγματος). He was among a group of Thematofylakes tou Syntagmatos members that were arrested for insurrection, violence against public workers, and the kidnapping of a school headmaster in Pieria. Some youth neo-Nazi groups in Central Greece have also been linked to Greeks for the Fatherland in late 2021 after their involvement in violent student protests.

== 2023 election ban ==
In January 2023, efforts began by the Greek Government to ban Kasidiaris' party from running in the 2023 elections. On 8 February 2023, an amendment was nominated by the Plenary of the Hellenic Parliament, which puts a brake on the descent of Ilias Kasidiaris in the 2023 elections, but also on other political figures whose leaders have been convicted of criminal acts. The party was banned from running in the election by the Areios Pagos on 2 May 2023.
