= Vasilis Stigkas =

Greek politician (born 1964)

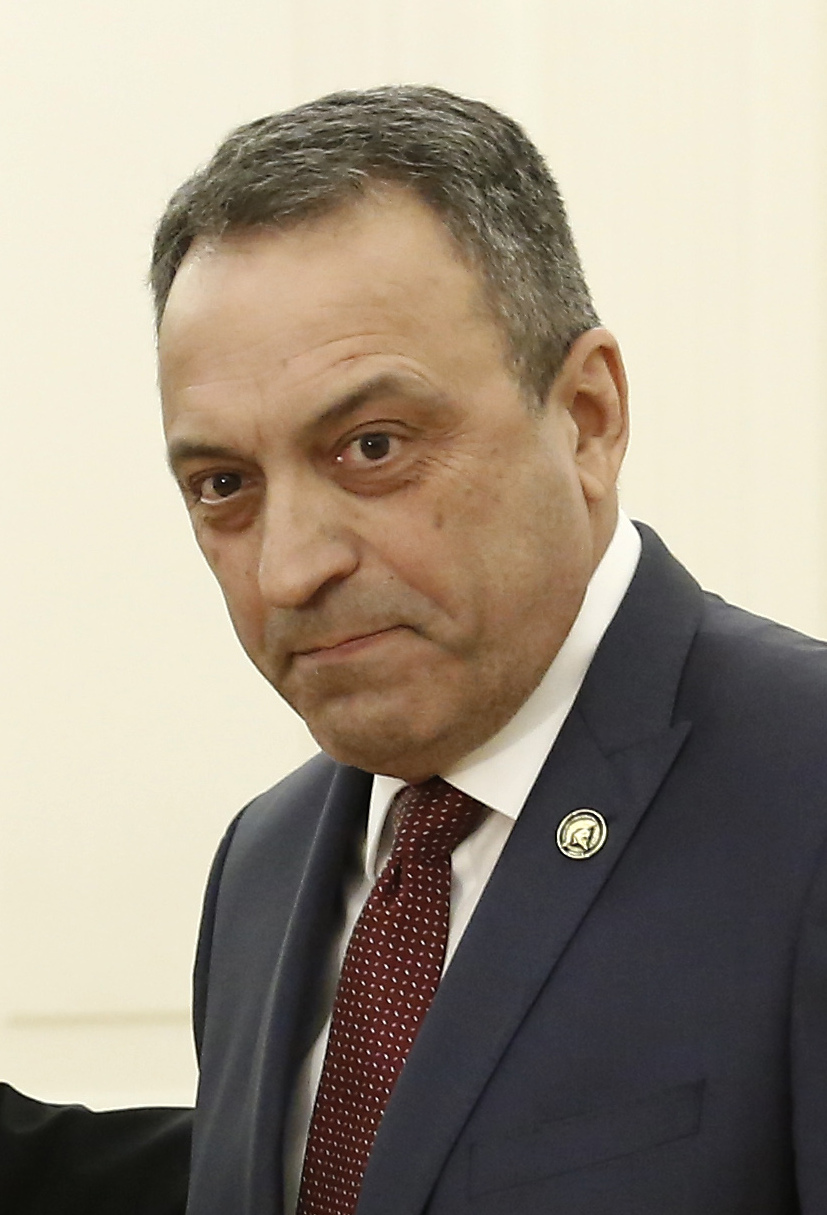

Vasilis Stigkas (Greek: Βασίλης Στίγκας; born 13 January 1964) is a Greek politician and president of the far-right political party Spartans.

He was a former executive of Political Spring. Around 2000 he joined the Popular Orthodox Rally (LAOS). After his departure from LAOS, he remained for many years without joining anywhere, until he joined the Radical National Alarm (or Radical National Rally) in the 2010s. In 2017, he founded the nationalist political party "Spartans". In 2019, he was a candidate for MEP on the list of the Union of Centrists.

In the elections of June 2023, the Spartans took part and had the support of Ilias Kasidiaris.

On 10 June 2025, Hellenic Parliament expelled Stigkas and two other Spartans MPs after being convicted by a court of proxying for a convicted member of the Golden Dawn party. Two other Spartans MPs were allowed to remain in parliament as independents.
