= Front Line (political party) =

Front Line Πρώτη Γραμμή Próti Grammí
- Founder: Konstantinos Plevris
- Founded: 1999
- Dissolved: 2000
- Succeeded by: reconstitution in 2017
- Headquarters: Athens
- Ideology: Metaxism
- Political position: Far-right
- Religion: Greek Orthodox Church
- National affiliation: K.Y.M.A of Hellenism
- Colours: Blue; Yellow

Website
- https://emeisprotigrammi.com

Front Line (Greek: Πρώτη Γραμμή, Próti Grammí) is a Greek nationalist party, formed in 1999.

The party is headed by Konstantinos Plevris, a self-confessed "Nazi, fascist, racist, anti-democrat, anti-Semite".

Front Line participated in the 1999 European Parliament elections (sharing a slate with the nationalist Golden Dawn party), obtaining 48,532 votes or 0.75 percent of the vote. In the Greek general election of 2000, it took 12,125 votes, or 0.18 percent of the poll.

Apart from Plevris, electoral candidates for the party have included: (in 1999) Panayiota Adonopoulou (Παναγιώτα Αντωνοπούλου), Nikolaos Michaloliakos (Νικόλαος Μιχαλολιάκος), and Michail Arvanitis-Avramis (Μιχαήλ Αρβανίτης-Αβράμης).

The party was dissolved in 2000. Many of its former members have joined the Popular Orthodox Rally, and others participated in the foundation of Patriotic Alliance.

In January 2017, a new party called "E.M.E.I.S" (United Front of Greek Ideology of Compatriots) was founded in Athens by Konstantinos Plevris, Tassos Symigdalas and others with the aim of uniting the parties and personalities of the "national space" and by bringing in contact the "national forces" to be able to run together in the elections. The old party of Plevris Front Line joined forces with this new body. (also found under the name "E.M.E.I.S - Front Line"). In December, the creation of a coalition was announced by ELASYN, LEPEN, the Spartans party, E.M.E.IS. and the Front Line, with the prospect of a joint electoral descent.

In December 2020, the formation of a coalition was announced by ELASYN, The Popular Hellenic Patriotic Union (LEPEN), the "Spartans party", the United Front of Greek Ideology of Compatriots (EMEIS) and the Front Line, with the prospect of a joint electoral descent with the name K.Y.M.A of Hellenism. In February 2021, the coalition announced the collaboration of the formation with the retired captain and chief of the Popular Citizens Movement (LAKIP) Andreas Petropoulos. In November 2021, ELASYN announced its departure from the K.Y.M.A of Hellenism.
