= National Popular Consciousness =

National Popular Consciousness Εθνική Λαϊκή Συνείδηση Ethnikí Laïkí Syneídisi
- Abbreviation: ELASYN
- President: Giorgos Loukakos; Giannis Zografos
- Honorary President: Giannis Lagos
- Founder: Giannis Lagos
- Founded: 9 November 2019
- Dissolved: 10 February 2023
- Split from: Golden Dawn
- Headquarters: Athens
- Ideology: Neo-Nazism; Christian fundamentalism; Greek nationalism
- Political position: Far-right
- Religion: Greek Orthodox Church
- European affiliation: Alliance for Peace and Freedom
- European Parliament group: Non-Inscrits (2019–2023)
- Colours: Blue; Red
- Anthem: "Ύμνος Ε.ΛΑ.ΣΥΝ" "E.LA.SYN anthem"
- European Parliament: 0 / 21

Party flag

Website
- https://elasyn.com

The National Popular Consciousness (ELASYN; Greek: Εθνική Λαϊκή Συνείδηση – ΕΛΑΣΥΝ) was a far-right political party founded by former members of Golden Dawn in 2019 in Greece. The founder and president of the party was MEP Giannis Lagos, who has been sentenced to 13 years in jail for his leadership and orchestration of Golden Dawn's criminal activities.

== Foundation ==
The National Popular Consciousness was founded by the convicted criminal and independent MEP, from the Golden Dawn, Giannis Lagos. On 9 November 2019, the Founding Conference of the party took place, which was attended by former MPs Panagiotis Iliopoulos, Giorgos Germenis and Sotiria Vlachou as well as other executives who had left the Golden Dawn. The party has also received support by the controversial far-right author Konstantinos Plevris. The Founding Declaration of the party was presented at the Conference and electoral procedures were held, through which Giannis Lagos was elected president and the Coordinating Council.

== History ==
In December 2020, the formation of a coalition was announced by ELASYN, The Popular Hellenic Patriotic Union (LEPEN), the "Spartans" party, the United Front of Greek Ideology of Compatriots (EMEIS) and the Front Line, with the prospect of a joint electoral descent with the name K.Y.M.A of Hellenism. In February 2021, the coalition announced the collaboration of the formation with the retired captain and chief of the Popular Citizens Movement (LAKIP) Andreas Petropoulos.

In March 2021, following a meeting of the Coordinating Council and with the consent of Giannis Lagos, the party was jointly chaired by George Loukakos and Giannis Zografos. Giannis Lagos was appointed honorary president of the party.

In November 2021, ELASYN announced its departure from the K.Y.M.A of Hellenism.

== Ban ==
In January 2023, efforts began by the Greek Government to ban parties like ELASYN from running in the 2023 elections. On February 8, 2023, an amendment was nominated by the Plenary of the Hellenic Parliament, which puts a brake on the descent in the 2023 elections to parties whose leaders or founders have been convicted of criminal acts like ELASYN and others. Two days later ELASYN dissolved itself.
