= Patriotic Alliance (Greece) =

Patriotic Alliance Πατριωτική Συμμαχία
- Abbreviation: PATRIS; PS
- Leader: Dimitrios Zaphiropoulos
- Founded: 21 April 2004
- Dissolved: January 2007
- Split from: Popular Orthodox Rally
- Newspaper: Eleftheros Kosmos
- Ideology: Greek nationalism Metaxism; Right-wing populism
- Political position: Far-right
- European affiliation: European National Front

Website
- www.symmaxia.gr (archived)

Patriotic Alliance (Greek: Πατριωτική Συμμαχία, ΠΑΤΡΙ.Σ.; πατρίς patris means fatherland in Greek) was a short-lived Greek ultranationalist political party, founded in 2004. It was a member party of the European National Front.

== Organisation and activities ==
On April 21, 2004, the Golden Dawn (Chrysi Avgi), former members of the Popular Orthodox Rally and a few other members of minor far-right groups, announced the foundation of Patriotic Alliance. The leader of the party was Dimitrios Zaphiropoulos (a former leading member of Golden Dawn) and its deputy was Ilias Panagiotaros. Other leading members of the party were Nikolaos Michaloliakos, leader of Golden Dawn, and Spyridon Zournatzis, former member of the European Parliament and former leading member of the far-right National Political Union.

Patriotic Alliance received 10,618 votes (0.17% of votes cast) in the 2004 European Parliament elections. The party also participated in the 2006 Athens municipal elections on the "Athens Greek City" (Αθήνα Πόλις Ελληνική - Athina Polis Elliniki) slate, gaining 3,705 votes, 1.34% of votes cast.

The party publishes the newspaper Eleftheros Kosmos.

Anti-fascist groups accused Patriotic Alliance for being simply the new name of the Golden Dawn party. Activities by Patriotic Alliance's members were often attributed to Golden Dawn (even by themselves).

== Disbandment ==
In January 2007, Patriotic Alliance ceased its political activities, after the interruption of support that accepted from the members and leadership of Golden Dawn. Golden Dawn claimed that the Patriotic Alliance began as a nationalist institution but had acquired finally some ideological content that led to gullible anachronisms that were connected with the former arrangement of the Greek military coup d'état (1967–1974). Seeing that its continuation of the alliance was fruitless, it asked and they achieved the interruption of all political collaborations that led to the end of the term "Alliance" and finally all party's activities. The newspaper of the party, Eleftheros Kosmos, continues to be published.
