= Eleftheros Kosmos =

Greek newspaper

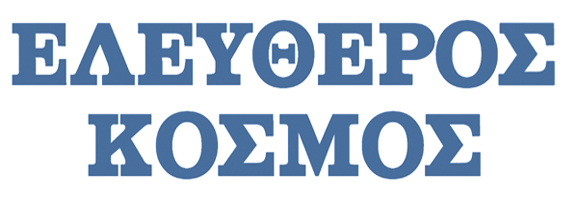
- Owner: Mihalis Georgilas
- Founder: Savvas Konstantopoulos
- Founded: 1966
- Political alignment: Conservative, Center-right
- Language: Greek
- Website: https://www.elkosmos.gr/

Eleftheros Kosmos (Greek: Ελεύθερος Κόσμος, Free World) is the oldest conservative newspaper in Greece.

== History ==
=== Initial period (1966-1982) ===
Eleftheros Kosmos was founded on July 27, 1966, by Savvas Konstantopoulos (1910-1981), former publisher of the daily Apogeumatini" and before that reporter and political analyst for the newspapers Neos Kosmos, Ethniki Floga, Ethniki, Ellinikon Aima, Akropolis and editor in chief of Asyrmatos. The newspaper circulated daily until 1982 when publishing temporarily ceased. Its title is derived from the free world that was fighting communism. Savvas Konstantopoulos was called "the theorist of the junta" (the military government that ruled Greece from 1967 to 1974). The newspaper was the semi official newspaper of that regime (known as the Regime of the Colonels or regime of the 21st of April).

The newspaper stopped publishing in 1982 due to financial difficulties after continuous litigation.

=== 1984-1999 ===
Initially as Eleftheros Kosmos and shortly thereafter as Ellinikos Kosmos (Greek world), the newspaper was the official newspaper of the nationalist political party EPEN, publishing weekly. Its main characteristic in this period was calls for the release of the imprisoned military junta leaders that ruled Greece between 1967 and 1974. This was also the main political aim of the party. Many journalists and cabinet members of the military government wrote for the newspaper during this period, including Spyros Zournatzis, Georgios Zervos and Spyros Stathopoulos.

=== 2003-2013 ===
The newspaper resumed weekly publishing, with Demetri Zafeiropoulo as its publisher and a group of writers primarily from the Golden Dawn political party. Between 2004 and 2007 the newspaper supported political party Patriotiki Symmahia. This was a political movement by former EPEN members, Golden Dawn and independent nationalists. 2007 brought a rift with Golden Dawn. During that time the newspaper and the lawyer/writer Konstantinos Plevris had been sued by the Central Board of Jewish Communities in Greece and the Greek Helsinki Monitor for "insult of Jews" and "injury to Judaism" based on the new antiracist law of Greece. Eventually both the newspaper and the author were acquitted of all charges.

The newspaper temporarily stopped circulating in 2011. It resumed in 2012 only to stop again that October. It was published again in November and for another year, this time as a monthly.

=== 2014- ===
Eleftheros Kosmos started circulating again in 2014 off and on as a weekly or monthly until 2020, when it stopped again due to financial difficulties. Today it maintains a news website, a YouTube channel, Eleftheri Teleorasi (Ελεύθερη Τηλεόραση), and it publishes books in collaboration with the publishing house Loghi (Λόγχη).
