= Aristotelis Kalentzis =

Aristotelis Irakleous Kalentzis (also Aristotelis Kalentzis or Aristoteles Kalentzis; Greek: Αριστοτέλης Ηρακλέους Καλέντζης) is a Greek national socialist horseback archery instructor and author who was sentenced in 1977 to 12 years in prison for terrorist activities (causing explosions, possession of explosives). After his release from prison, he was interviewed by journalist Greek TV reportage show "Made In Greece" and openly admitted to being a national socialist. In another part of his interview, he said (in Greek) that Adolf Hitler is a "prophet of the World" and "an erratic person for those who can understand the deeper side of History". He also said that "violence is in Nature's game. National socialists are always in Nature's game, because they are nothing but a part of Nature. Now, if violence is necessary to solve some problems, then we will not deny it"; see the "Τα MME και η κολυμπήθρα του Σιλωάμ (The Mass Media and the Pool of Siloam)" reference in the "References and external links" section of this article.

== Aristotelis Kalentzis vs. Greece ==
On 14 July 1987, Kalentzis wrote to the European Commission of Human Rights, filing a complaint against Greece claiming that, while he was serving his 12-year sentence in Korydallos Prison, he was orally and wrongly forbidden by the director of the prison to be in possession of a book he had written, in which he related his experiences during his first years in prison. His motion was rejected by the Commission. The case and the Commission's decision and reasoning are documented in pages 125-166 of the Commission's publication of proceedings "Décisions et rapports, Volumes 73-74" (see external link in the "References and external links" section).

== In recent years ==
After his release, in an interview he gave to Greek strasserist blog "Mavros Krinos" (Μαύρος Κρίνος - Black Lily), Kalentzis appeared to have effectively resigned from all political action. However, he regularly contributes articles on the aforementioned strasserist blog. He also seems to enjoy some acceptance among some Greek Polytheism groups, since he is favorably mentioned as an esteemed guest at some festivals of one polytheism group, such as the "Thermopyleia 2009" (the link provided points to a relevant post in Greek neo-pagan forum theasis.gr, where his name was mentioned right next to the names of people such as National and Kapodistrian University of Athens professor Maria Tzani (Μαρία Τζάνη). However his views are strongly rejected by several Hellen polytheists on the grounds of being totally at odds with Hellenic religion and Cosmotheasis.

He has also emerged as a horseback archery instructor, as he runs a training company for this sport, named "Ελληνική Εφιπποτοξοτική Εταιρεία" - Hellenic Horseback Archery Company. This company seems to be associated with the Hungarian Kassai school of horseback archery. See the announcements of Kalentzis' company, containing a multitude of Press releases in Greek; most revealing are those of 22 June 2009 ("22α Ιουνίου, 2009" in the webpage's Greek text) and 1 July 2009 ("1η Ιουλίου, 2009" in the webpage's Greek text); these releases reveal Kalentzis' ties with the Greek neo-pagan movement.

Kalentzis' horseback archery company has also been practically advertised on 18 November 2009, exactly one day after the anniversary of the Athens Polytechnic Uprising, in Greek newspaper "Τα Νέα" in an article (in Greek) written by Petros Stefanis, entitled "Αμαζόνες σε επικίνδυνες αποστολές" (Amazons in dangerous missions).
