= Ilias Kasidiaris =

Greek politician (born 1980)

- Ηλίας Κασιδιάρης
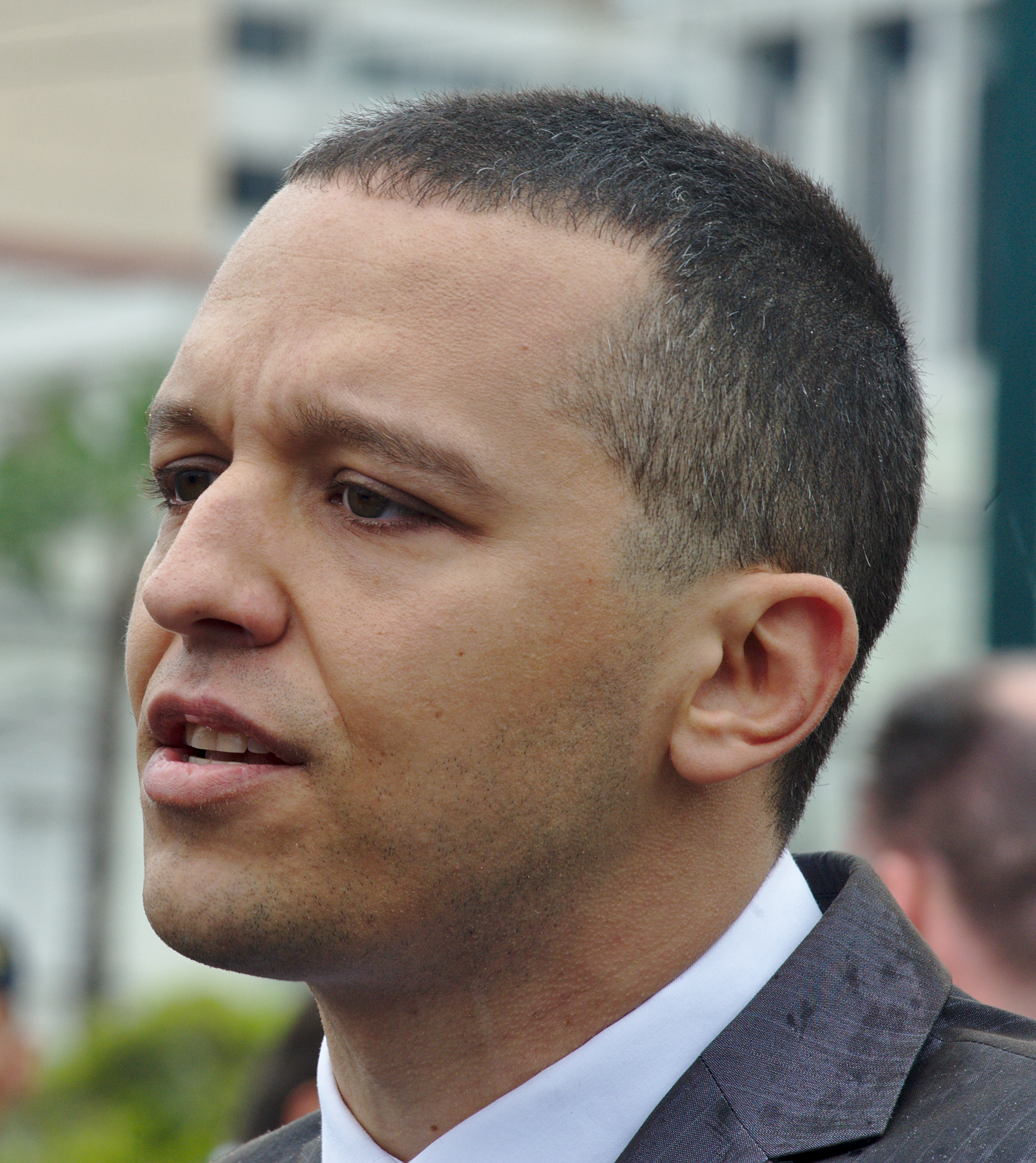
- Kasidiaris in 2016

President of National Party – Greeks
- In office 4 June 2020 – May 2022
- Succeeded by: Dimitrios Chatziliadis

Member of the Hellenic Parliament
- In office 6 May 2012 – 11 June 2019
- Constituency: Attica

Personal details
- Born: 29 November 1980 (age 45) Keratsini, Greece
- Party: Alliance of Greeks (Since 2026); National Party – Greeks (2020—2025); Golden Dawn (2001–2020)
- Education: Agricultural University of Athens
- Occupation: Politician, agriculturalist, author

Military service
- Allegiance: Greece
- Branch/service: Hellenic Army
- Unit: 35th Commando Battalion

Ilias Kasidiaris (Greek: Ηλίας Π. Κασιδιάρης; born 29 November 1980) is a Greek far-right politician who has been convicted of directing a criminal organization for his actions as a high-ranking member of the neo-Nazi Golden Dawn party and sentenced to 13.5 years in prison. He was a leader of Golden Dawn, who served from 2012 until 2019 as a member of the Hellenic Parliament elected with Golden Dawn. In May 2020, he left Golden Dawn and founded the political party National Party – Greeks, which was formerly known as Greeks for the Fatherland. In October 2020, he was convicted of directing a criminal organization and sentenced to 13.5 years in prison, and his conviction was upheld on appeal in March 2026, when he was sentenced to 13 years in prison.

== Early and personal life ==
Kasidiaris was born on 29 November 1980 in Keratsini, Greece.

Kasidiaris' father, Panagiotis Kasidiaris, is a retired doctor. His mother is a teacher in philology with a specialization in archaeology. As a child, he was attracted to gymnastics, martial arts, writing and history. He also took many dance classes, including tango.

During his military service, he served in the 1st Raider/Paratrooper Brigade and more specifically in the 35th Commando Battalion in Cyprus. He holds a degree in agriculture with a specialty in food chemistry from the Agricultural University of Athens.

== Political career ==
=== 2000s ===
In 2001, Golden Dawn publications started publishing his texts, in which he defended the party leader Nikos Michaloliakos and party members convicted or accused for violent actions, like the -then fugitive- "Periandros". He featured in a 2004 issue of Golden Dawn's youth magazine, Resistance, teaching street fighting techniques. In February 2005 he published a news report entitled "Rock for the Fatherland!" in which he praised the racist song of a German band that participated in a neo-nazi music groups concert that had been organized by Golden Dawn, advertised by its publications and taken place the previous month, with Golden Dawn's leadership attending. People present in the concert shouted neo-Nazi slogans and gave Nazi salutes, sang the Greek national anthem and the national anthem of Nazi Germany and raised the flag of Wehrmacht and of the SS. Photographs of a journey of his in England, that were published in Golden Dawn's journal Resistance, portray him wearing a T-shirt with SS-related logos and along with the racist and neo-Nazi-oriented music group Whitelaw.

=== 2010s ===
In an interview conducted by Nikos Evangelatos on Skai TV in May 2012, Kasidiaris declined to condemn Nazi leader Adolf Hitler, stating that "his role in history will be judged in time". He reiterated his stance against immigrants in Greece.

Kasidiaris quoted The Protocols of the Elders of Zion in a 23 October 2012 speech to parliament. Defending himself in a discussion of whether to lift his parliamentary immunity over his assault of Kanelli, he quoted the passage, "In order to destroy the prestige of heroism we shall send them for trial in the category of theft, murder and every kind of abominable and filthy crime." Kasidiaris, as well as two of his Golden Dawn colleagues, had their parliamentary immunity revoked by a unanimous vote of the parliament.

In mid-2013, while in the Hellenic Parliament, Kasidiaris said that he and other members of parliament were Holocaust deniers.

Following the murder of anti-fascist rapper Pavlos Fyssas on 17 September 2013, Kasidiaris and a number of other Golden Dawn lawmakers were arrested on 28 September 2013 on charges of belonging to a criminal organisation. The charge sheet included murder, extortion, and involvement in the disappearance of up to 100 migrants. On 2 October 2013, Ilias Kasidiaris was released on a 50,000 euro bail.

In 2012 he celebrated winter solstice along with other Golden Dawn members In 2014 a photograph was published of Kasidiaris and other Golden Dawn members giving a Nazi salute while holding the Third Reich's Reichskriegsfahne. Kasidiaris claimed that the photograph was a montage and that the original photo did not feature the Reichkriegsfahne, but a flag bearing the Celtic cross, a claim also supported by Golden Dawn. Lawyers of the prosecution team replied that the photograph was found in possession of a Golden Dawn member. The photograph featuring Kasidiaris holding Wehrmahct's flag had been found saved in his mobile phone and was used in the trial of Golden Dawn in June 2018.

He has a swastika tattoo on his arm, which he has described as a "time-old and eternal symbol of Greekness".

On 2 April 2014, Takis Baltakos and Ilias Kasidiaris were recorded on video discussing the incarceration of Golden Dawn lawmakers. Takis Baltakos, Samaras's most trusted adviser and chief of staff was filmed accusing Samaras of instigating a judicial inquiry against the Golden Dawn party for political gain. That week, parliament voted to lift the immunity from prosecution of five Golden Dawn deputies. Justice Minister Athanasiou and Citizen Protection Minister Dendias were also implicated in the video. Baltakos was forced to resign but then claimed that New Democracy and Golden Dawn had an informal alliance, with parliamentary voting support. The pre-trial detention and house arrest ahead of a trial was the most significant mass round-up of lawmakers since the military coup in 1967.

On 10 July 2014, Kasidiaris was taken into custody in Koridalos prison, on a charge of weapons possession with the intent to supply a criminal organisation. On 1 July 2015, Kasidiaris was released from custody after the council of appeals court judges deemed that "the legal weight" of the offense was not adequate to justify detention. Kasidiaris was required to report regularly to his local police station and under the conditions of his release was not allowed to visit Golden Dawns political offices.

After the infamous parliamentary disruption on 15 July 2015, where Ilias Kasidiaris tore up papers during debates over Greece’s third bailout, his political career continued into darker territory. Kasidiaris went on to become one of the leading figures of the neo-nazi party Golden Dawn, which the Athens Court of Appeals later determined was not just a political organization but a criminal organization engaged in violence, attacks on immigrants and political opponents, and other serious crimes.

=== 2020s ===
In October 2020, the Athens Court of Appeals convicted Kasidiaris and other Golden Dawn members of directing and operating a criminal organisation in disguise, handing him a sentence of 13 years’ imprisonment, alongside all other senior members for the role they played at the head of the group.

That landmark verdict followed revelations of violent, extremist actions tied to the party, including the murder of anti‑fascist artist Pavlos Fyssas and attacks on migrant workers, for which Golden Dawn members were also convicted. Although Kasidiaris continues to deny responsibility for specific violent acts and challenges elements of the case, the court’s judgment remains legally binding, and he is currently serving his sentence under Greek law.

In 2020, Kasidiaris founded the National Party – Greeks. Following the exclusion of the National Party from both the May and June 2023 elections, Kasidiaris announced its "full support" for the Spartans political party. The Spartans party won 12 seats in the elections. In his first public statement after the election, Vasilis Stigkas openly thanked Kasidiaris for "[being] the fuel that has propelled us to [entering parliament]".

On 27 July 2023, Kasidiaris announced that he would run for mayor of Athens. The Spartans political party fully supported him. His candidacy was made official on 10 August, and he was registered as a candidate on 10 September for the 2023 Athens Municipal Elections. On election day, he received 8.5% of the vote or 11,643 votes and he was elected to the Athens municipal council, but he has since resigned from the position.

The Spartans were barred from participating in the 2024 European Parliament elections. In the 2024 European elections, Kasidiaris declared that he would vote for retired artillery officer Charalambos Giotis, head of a municipal faction in the municipality of Athens that was on the Patriots party's ballot. Subsequently, the candidate received almost double the number of crosses from the party's president himself, Prodromos Emfietzoglou.

In 2025, a judicial investigation by the Prosecutor of Greece’s Supreme Civil and Criminal Court, led to the indictment of the entire parliamentary group for electoral fraud, with Kasidiaris also charged for instigating the fraud. In May 2025, the Court of Appeal unanimously acquitted all 11 accused MPs, including Kasidiaris, finding no evidence that they had misled voters.

In 2026, he was released from prison and announced that he supports the far-right party Alliance of Greeks, without specifying whether he will be a candidate for election. Many media falsely reported that he was the founder of the party.

== Televised Dourou–Kanelli assault ==
On 7 June 2012, during a television appearance on ANT1, Kasidiaris, in response to a verbal disagreement, splashed a glass of water at Greek politician Rena Dourou, and then proceeded to slap Liana Kanelli multiple times after she struck him with a piece of paper.

The heated exchange was a fluid discussion focusing on the rights of immigrant workers vs right of the unemployed Greeks and the development of gas reservoirs in northern Crete eventually disintegrating from a heated debate to broken rhetoric from both sides about opinion on the Regime of the Colonels to the persecution of Golden Dawn activists. The discussion broke down when Kanelli referred to Kasidiaris as a "fascist" «φασίστα». Kasidiaris responded by derogatorily calling her «παλιοκομμούνι», that is, a "dirty communist". Dourou interrupted and said there was a democratic crisis in Greece and that Golden Dawn would take the country back 500 years if they ever got into power, insulting Kasidiaris and his party. Kasidiaris reacted by throwing a glass of water at Dourou, while verbally insulting her. Dorou then grinned at the subsequent scuffle as Kanelli hit Kasidiaris with a piece of paper, which Kasidiaris reacted to by pushing her back and slapping her multiple times.

In Greece, it was openly debated by the press whether Kasidiaris had been right or wrong and he was widely cheered online. Supporters claim that he only retaliated and that Dourou's and Kanelli's actions were provocative, while opponents state that this was assaulting a woman on live television.

In March 2015, Kasidiaris attended court to face charges of grievous bodily harm. Giorgos Papadakis, a presenter and journalist who witnessed the assault, stated that threats were also made to television crew and other employees.

A Facebook page dedicated to Kasidiaris picked up 6,000 likes within 24 hours.

Kasidiaris was also awaiting trial for allegedly being the getaway driver for an armed assault on a university professor in Athens in 2007. He was convicted relating to the 2007 incident, but found not guilty of all charges on appeal in March 2013, given the benefit of the doubt. Reporters covering the appeal trial reported that the police allowed Kasidiaris to control who entered the courtroom, which was full of Golden Dawn supporters terrorizing judges and witnesses.

== Works and other media ==
Since 2019, Kasidiaris has run a politically focused YouTube channel.

Ilias Kasidiaris

YouTube information
- Channel: Ηλίας Κασιδιάρης
- Years active: 2019–present
- Genre: politics
- Subscribers: 162 thousand
- Views: 30 million
- Last updated: September 15, 2026

Kasidiaris has written several books during his presence in Golden Dawn and his stay in prison.

- Sector X (2010)
- The Other Spartans (2013)
- Political Prison Diary (2015)
- Melan Honor (2020)
- Crusade Against Islam (2021)
- The Truth Behind COVID-19 (2022)
- The Doctrine of the Seven Seas (2023)
- My General and Emperor Alexander (2024)
- Greece Belongs to the Greeks (2025)
- Political Prisoner (2026)
