= 4th of August Party =

4th of August Party Κόμμα 4ης Αυγούστου
- Abbreviation: K4A
- Leader: Konstantinos Plevris
- Founded: July 1965
- Dissolved: 1977
- Ideology: Metaxism; Neo-fascism; Greek nationalism
- Political position: Far-right
- Colors: Black, red

The 4th of August Party (K4A; Greek: Κόμμα 4ης Αυγούστου, romanized: Kómma 4is Avgoústou, [ˈkoma teˈtartis avˈɣustu]) was a radical Greek Metaxist political party, founded in July 1965 by a group of young nationalists and led by Konstantinos Plevris, a self-confessed "Nazi, fascist, racist, anti-democrat, anti-Semite". It was named after and inspired by the 4th of August Regime of Prime Minister Ioannis Metaxas.

== Dissolution ==
On 24 February 1977, Aristotelis Kalentzis, a member of the party, was arrested along with others for possession of explosives and weapons in an apartment in Kato Patissia. In retaliation, comrades of those arrested responded with a barrage of bombings targeting left-wing organizations and publications in the Athens area. In the trial that followed, Kalentzis was sentenced to 12 years in prison in October of the same year, which he served.

In the same trial, Konstantinos Plevris was also a co-defendant for incitement, but he was acquitted. Kalentzis, later incarcerated in the prisons of Nea Alikarnassos initially and then of Corfu and describing himself as a "political prisoner", openly and publicly accused Plevris of being an informant for the National Intelligence Service through his book Democracy 80. Katergos (1980) and the pamphlet The Black Book of Kostas Plevris. Kalentzis essentially claimed that Plevris trapped him, "selling" him to the police authorities, as he did with other comrades. For his part, Plevris categorically denied the allegations and denounced "new nationalists".

In such an atmosphere, the party could no longer continue its activities and decided to suspend its operation in 1977. In October 1977, the last issue of the party newspaper was published.
