= Konstantinos Plevris =

Greek politician, lawyer, historian and author

Konstantinos A. Plevris (Greek: Κωνσταντίνος Α. Πλεύρης; born 5 December 1939), sometimes called in English Constantine Plevris or Kostas Plevris, is a Greek politician, lawyer, nationalist, and author.

He has, over the course of decades, written a number of books and other texts relating to Greek history, Greek culture, sociology, and politics, with a clear nationalist, homophobic (such as his book titled Οι Κίναιδοι, a vehement polemic against homosexuals) content. In his book The Jews: The Whole Truth, he described himself as a "Nazi, fascist, racist, anti-democrat, anti-Semite". He was the founder and leader of the Metaxist 4th of August Party and Front Line, with the former political party not only playing a significant role in influencing and shaping the future direction of the Greek extreme right but also being itself as a prominent political movement before the Greek junta in general. He has also co-operated (according to interviews he gave to various publications, including one to Italian magazine L'Europeo in 1976, which were quoted and accepted as proof in a court of law in which he was the plaintiff against the author Nikos Kleitsikas) with various European neo-fascist groups (including the Ordine Nuovo), and figures such as Pino Rauti, Pino Romualdi, Giorgio Almirante. He later briefly joined the right-wing party Popular Orthodox Rally and was its leading candidate in the 2004 elections. He is the father of Thanos Plevris, member of the Greek parliament formerly with the Popular Orthodox Rally party, now with New Democracy.

In December 2007, Plevris was initially found guilty of inciting racial hatred by a Greek court based on excerpts and quotations in his book The Jews: The Whole Truth. He appealed the court ruling and on 27 March 2009 the court of appeals overturned the ruling of incitement 4–1. Plevris was cleared on the charge of having caused violence by the five-member court, but it was noted that he was a Holocaust denier. The court justified his acquittal by stating "The defendant does not revile the Jews solely because of their racial and ethnic origin, but mainly because of their aspirations to world power, the methods they use to achieve these aims, and their conspiratorial activities". The ruling prompted some charges of miscarriage of justice.

== Education and academic background ==
Plevris was born Athens. He graduated from the Lycée Léonin. He received his degree in law from the Aristotle University of Thessaloniki, his degree in political science from the Panteion University, and his degree in sociology from France (ΝΟΕ Παρισίων). As a professor, he taught political sociology and psychological warfare at the School of Police Officers and the Faculty of General Education of the Hellenic Army General Staff.

== Controversy ==
=== Terrorism charges ===
In 1977, Plevris was brought up on charges of incitement of terrorist activities (bombing attacks), along with Aristotelis Kalentzis, who was accused of being the perpetrator of these acts. Plevris claimed that Kalentzis was never a member of his 4th of August Party and admitted that he informed the authorities of weapons and explosives possessed by Kalentzis. Plevris was cleared of the incitement charges, while Kalentzis was sentenced to 12 years in prison; this caused Kalentzis to write several books accusing Plevris of being a para-state agent and a snitch that framed him.

=== Lawsuit against Nikos Kleitsikas ===
In his 2000 book The Greek Student Movement in Italy Nikos Kleitsikas wrote that Plevris was a CIA or Mossad agent during the Cold War and participated in bombings. Plevris successfully sued Nikos Kleitsikas and the publisher of the book, Aggelos Sideratos, for libel in the summer of 2006. The Greek court of appeals vindicated him and the defendants were forced to pay 15,000 euros in compensation for the not well documented claim that Plevris organized and participated in provocative acts to pave the path for the coup d'état that brought into power the Greek military junta of 1967–1974, but the court found and accepted that the defendant proved Plevris' fascist leanings, as well as his connection with European neo-fascist terrorist groups and personalities (such as Pino Rauti and the far-right terrorist group Ordine Nuovo), his collaboration with the Greek junta and his collaboration with various secret services, based on Plevris' own statements in interviews he had given.

=== Lawsuit over Jews: The Whole Truth ===
Konstantinos Plevris is the author of Jews: The Whole Truth, an antisemitic book containing outright praises for Adolf Hitler and calls for the extermination of Jews, published by Adonis Georgiades in June 2006. For this book Plevris was indicted by the Greek District Attorney on charges of inciting racial violence. Shortly after its publication in June 2006 the Central Board of Jewish Communities in Greece and the Greek Helsinki Monitor brought a suit against Plevris for "insult of Jews" and "injury to Judaism". For this book Plevris was indicted by the Greek district attorney on charges of inciting racial violence. Shortly after its publication the Central Board of Jewish Communities in Greece and the Greek Helsinki Monitor brought a suit against Plevris for "insulting Jews" and "injury to Judaism". They also brought charges against the newspaper Eleftheros Kosmos (published by Golden Dawn party's former second-in-command Dimitris Zafeiropoulos), which published extracts of the book.

Panagiotis Dimitras of the Greek Helsinki Monitor began to visit the Public Prosecutor's Office of District Court Judges on a daily basis to push the public prosecutors for legal action against Plevris and nationalist weekly newspaper Eleftheros Kosmos, which published extracts of the book, on charges of racism. After two months, and the support of the Central Board of Jewish Communities in Greece, he eventually succeeded and so, in December 2006, Plevris was indicted for violation of Article 191 of the Penal Code, the dissemination of false news.

Several weeks later Eleftheros Kosmos and Plevris learned that they were being taken to court under the Greek Anti-Racist Law of 1979, a fact they say they were never informed of, although Plevris quoted this particular law in its entirety in his book. They held that the case should be thrown out for this reason alone, although the argument that one did not know the law is not acceptable in a Greek court of law. Both Plevris and Eleftheros Kosmos characterized the lawsuit as an attempt to suppress free speech. According to Plevris, this lawsuit had no legal basis because it was, to quote Plevris, a "violation of articles 320, 321 (paragraph 1), and 111 (paragraph 7) of the Greek Penal Code". Because this is the first time the aforementioned law has ever been used in Greek judicial history, this law is regarded as historic by both sides.

In the book, Plevris describes himself as a "Racist, anti-democrat, anti-Semite" (p. 600), subscribes to the myth of The Protocols of the Elders of Zion (which he presents as authentic and valid evidence against the Jews), characterizes Jewish children in the concentration camps as "very fat" and "well-fed", claims that Jews are "subhuman" (p. 583) "mortal enemies", and criticizes the Nazis for "not ridding Europe of Jewish Zionism". In the same book, he characterizes former UN secretary Kofi Annan as "cannibal" and "descendant of cannibals" and states that Jews need to be "rounded-up and executed within 24 hours", which is "the only way they understand" (p. 742). However, Plevris contends that "Of the 1,400 pages of my large book, the condemnation encompasses only several paragraphs, of which portions were extracted, with the result that another meaning was given to the words and truth is distorted due to the alteration of phrases".

The first hearing, which was set for 5 September 2007, was postponed until 11 September 2007. The trial began on 11 September 2007 but, due to time constraints, it was again postponed, this time to 3 December 2007.

On the first court date, 150 supporters, mainly from neo-Nazi and nationalist groups, attended to show moral support for Plevris and Eleftheros Kosmos and over 200 police officers were stationed in the area out of fear that there would be clashes. However, the planned anti-fascist gathering never materialized and there were no incidents.

On 13 December 2007, the court found Plevris guilty of inciting racial hatred and handed him a 14-month suspended sentence. His co-accused, the publisher, editor and a journalist of Eleftheros Kosmos were found not guilty. Plevris condemned the verdict, stating that "Jews are trying to fight me with this trial so they can shut my mouth".

Plevris appealed and was eventually acquitted on 27 March 2009; his acquittal caused a controversy as to whether the Greek justice system failed to enforce Greece's antiracist legislation.

==== Counter-lawsuit over Jews: The Whole Truth ====
In response to publications of Eleftherotypia's "Ios" which depicts Jews: The Whole Truth as a "Fascistic and anti-Semitic" book and Plevris as a "Fascist", Plevris launched a SLAPP-type libel suit against the newspaper for the sum of €1.2 million. All four journalists of "Ios" and its editor-in-chief publisher were sued for €200,000 each. Plevris also sued Panagiotis Dimitras of the Greek Helsinki Monitor for the sum of €200,000 as compensation for libel. In addition, Plevris counter-sued all seven executive members of the Central Board of Jewish Communities in Greece for €200,000 each. He dropped the charges in May 2013 and the court determined that the defendants had not made false accusations.

As a result of the entire affair, Plevris wrote a book entitled The Struggle for the Truth: The Adventure of a Book, which claimed to detail the events, controversy, and circumstances of the last 15 months of the affair.

== Works ==
- "Άουσβιτς, Μύθοι και Πραγματικότητες" ("Auschwitz: myths and truths/facts", referring to the Nazi camp). Athens: Ήλεκτρον 2018.
- "O Βασιλεύς Αλέξανδρος" ("King Alexander (the Great)"). Athens: Ήλεκτρον, 2015.
- "ΟΙ ΕΛΛΗΝΕΣ" ("The Greeks" - in two parts). Athens: Ήλεκτρον, 2013.
- "Ο ΣΩΚΡΑΤΗΣ πριν τον θάνατον" ("SOCRATES before death", translated). Athens: Ήλεκτρον 2012.
- "ΡΑΤΣΙΣΜΟΣ - Από το ψεύδος στην αλήθειαν" ("Racism"). Athens: Ήλεκτρον 2012.
- "Ο ΑΓΩΝ ΔΙΑ ΤΗΝ ΑΛΗΘΕΙΑΝ – Η ΠΕΡΙΠΕΤΕΙΑ ΕΝΟΣ ΒΙΒΛΙΟΥ" ("The Struggle for the truth - the adventure of a book"). Athens: Ήλεκτρον, 2007.
- "Η ΤΗΛΕΟΡΑΣΙΣ" ("The television"). Athens: Ήλεκτρον, 2007.
- "Εβραίοι, όλη η Αλήθεια" ("Jews, all the truth"). Athens: Ήλεκτρον, 2006.
- "Η ΕΠΑΝΑΣΤΑΣΙΣ" ("The revolution"). Athens: Ήλεκτρον, 2006.
- "ΧΕΖΜΠΟΛΑΧ - Ο Αγών της" ("Hizballah - her Struggle"). Athens: Ήλεκτρον, 2006.
- "ΟΙ ΚΙΝΑΙΔΟΙ" (*The faggots*). Athens: Ήλεκτρον, 2005.
- "ΒΑΣΙΛΕΙΑ" ("Monarchy"). Athens: Ήλεκτρον, 2004.
- "21 Απριλιου 1967" ("21 April 1967", referring to 1967 Greek coup d'état). Athens: Ήλεκτρον, 2003.
- "Αγία Σοφία: Εθνικόν Χρέος των Ελλήνων η Απελευθέρωσίς Της" (Agia Sofia: National duty of the Greeks its liberation"). Athens: Νέα Θέσις, 1997.
- "Βασιλεία". ("Monarchy") Athens: Ηλεκτρον, 2004.
- "Ο Αξιωματικός και οι Νεοραγιάδες" ("The Officer and the Neo-serfs"). Athens: Νεα Θεσις, 2002.
- "Ο Διωγμός των Αρίστων". ("The persecution of the best elements of society") Athens: Νέα Θέσις, 1987.
- "Η Σημαία" ("The flag"). Athens: Ηλεκτρον, 2004.
- "θρήσκευμα και Ταυτότης: Πλήρης και στοιχειοθετημένη ανάλυσις του ζητήματος, δια την αναγραφήν του θρησκεύματος εις τας ταυτότητας" ("Religion and identity: Complete and fact-supported analysis of the issue, for the inclusion of religion in the identities", referring to the new Greek national identity cards which replaced the old national identity cards of Greece which included the religion of the cardholder in its data). Athens: Ηλεκτρον, 2004.
- "Ο Λαός Ξεχνά τι Σημαίνει Αριστερά: κείμενα και φωτογραφίαι" ("The people forget what leftism means: texts and photographs"). Athens: Ήλεκτρον, 2003.
- "Κοινωνιολογία" ("Sociology"). Athens: Νεα Θεσις, 1985.
- "Η θητεία μου στην Κ.Υ.Π (Κρατική Υπηρεσία Πληροφορίων)" (My service at the State Intelligence Agency).Athens:Νεα Θεσις, 1989
- "Ο Καπιταλιστής: Ένα συνοπτικό σημείωμα για τον εκμεταλλευτή των ανθρώπων" ("The Capitalist: A summary note for the exploiter of the humans"). Athens: Νεα Θεσις, 1989.
- "Πας Μη Έλλην Βάρβαρος: Εννοιολογική παρουσίασις του δηλωτικού της Ελληνικής υπεροχής". ("Whoever is not Greek is a Barbarian") Athens: Ηλεκτρον, 2003.
- "Ιωάννης Μεταξάς (Βιογραφία)" ("Ioannis Metaxas (Biography)", referring to Ioannis Metaxas). Athens: Κοκκινη Μηλια, 1975.
- "Τα Είκοσι Πρωτόκολλα της Προδοσίας" ("The twenty protocols of the treason"). Athens: Νεα Θεσις, 1995.
- "Ας Μιλήσουμε Για Εβραίους!" ("Let us talk about Jews!") Athens: Νεα Θεσις, 1990.
- "Αντιδημοκράτης" ("Antidemocrat"). 1965.
- "Μετακομμουνισμός" ("Metacommunism"). 1967.
- "Πολιτική Προπαγάνδα" ("Political propaganda"). 1968.
- "Κοσμοθεωρία του Εθνικισμού" ("The World View of Nationalism"). 1969.
