= Apogevmatini =

Daily newspaper

Apogevmatini (Greek: Απογευματινή, "Afternoon") is a Greek newspaper published nationally in Athens. The newspaper was founded by Nasos and Sakis Botsis in 1952. It had a semi-liberal approach towards the economy and a right-wing political orientation.

In 2010 the Sarantopoulos family, the then owners of the title, declared the newspaper bankrupt.

In 2023 the newspaper recirculated under publisher Nikos Kourtakis, who also is head editor of the newspaper Parapolitika.
