= Metaxism =

Political ideology of Ioannis Metaxas

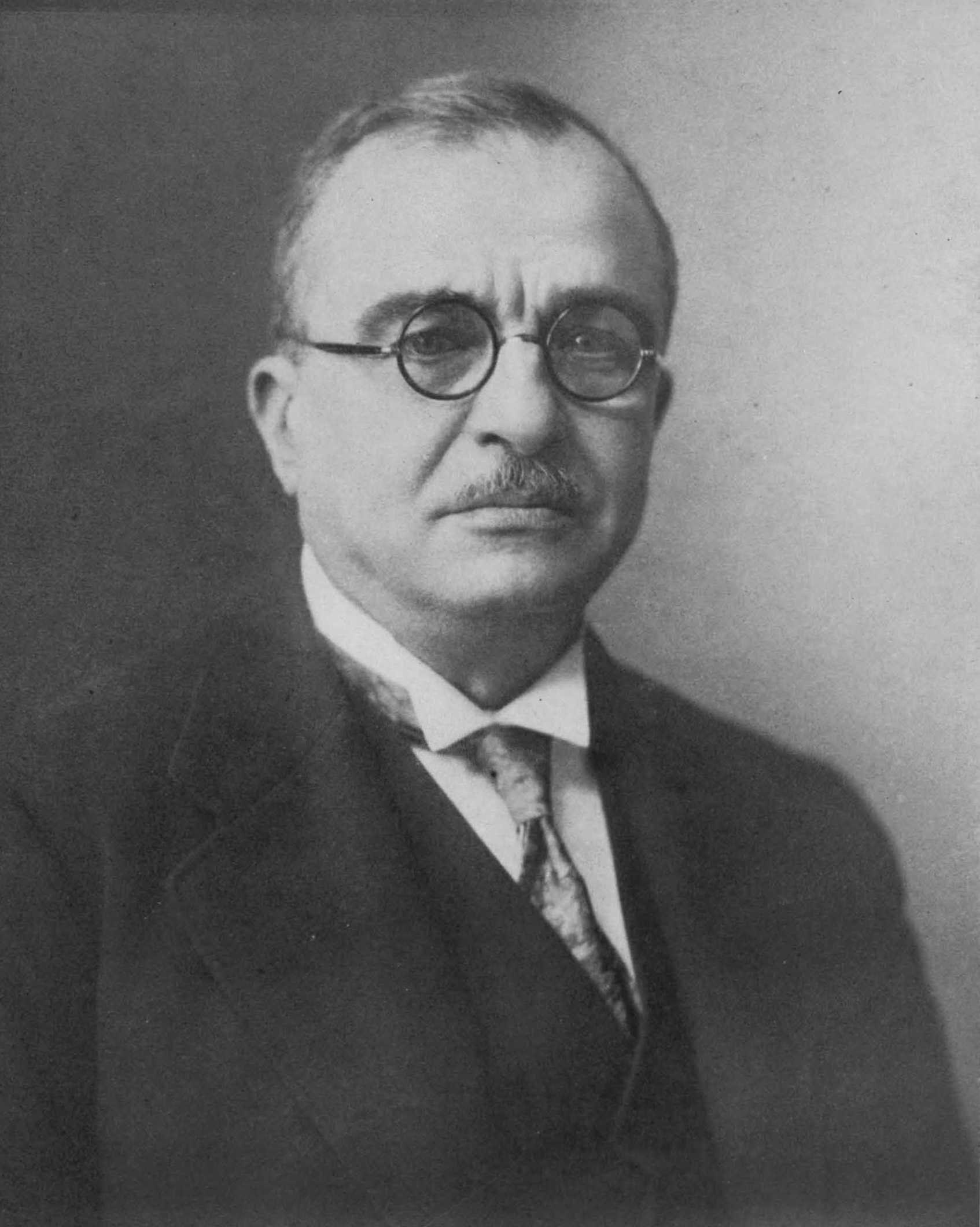
Ioannis Metaxas, after whom Metaxism is named

Metaxism (Greek: Μεταξισμός) is the political ideology associated with Ioannis Metaxas. It called for the regeneration of the Greek nation and the establishment of a modern, culturally homogenous Greece. Metaxism disparaged liberalism, and held individual interests to be subordinate to those of the nation, seeking to mobilize the Greek people as a disciplined mass in service to the creation of a "new Greece."

Metaxas declared that his 4th of August Regime (1936–1941) represented a "Third Greek Civilization" which was committed to the creation of a culturally purified Greek nation based upon the militarist societies of ancient Macedonia and Sparta, which he held to constitute the "First Greek Civilization"; and the Orthodox Christian ethic of the Byzantine Empire, which he considered to represent the "Second Greek Civilization." The Metaxas regime asserted that true Greeks were ethnically Greek and Orthodox Christian, intending to deliberately exclude Albanians, Slavs, and Turks residing in Greece from Greek citizenship.

Although the Metaxas government and its official doctrines are sometimes described as fascist, such historians as Stanley G. Payne consider it to have been a conventional authoritarian-conservative dictatorship akin to Francisco Franco's Spain or António de Oliveira Salazar's Portugal; such historians as Kofas maintain that the regime had a powerful quasi-fascist element, some contemporary historians characterize it as totalitarian (as Metaxas himself did) or even fascist. The Metaxist government derived its authority from the conservative establishment and its doctrines strongly supported traditional institutions such as the Greek Orthodox Church and the Greek Monarchy; essentially reactionary, it lacked the radical theoretical dimensions of ideologies such as Italian fascism and Nazism. The regime also lacked antisemitism, which it regarded as "distasteful".

The ideology of Metaxism was associated with Metaxas' political party, the Freethinkers' Party and the 4th of August Regime. In the post-war period it has been advocated by the 4th of August Party, the Golden Dawn party and the ELAM party.

== History ==
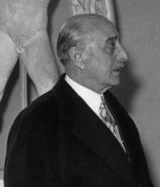
Alexandros Papagos, leader of Greek Rally.

The ideology developed by Metaxas began with Metaxas' response to the revolution of 1922 that put in a pro-republican government in Greece. Metaxas formed the Freethinkers' Party, a monarchist party that originally supported the advancement of civil liberties, though this changed with Metaxas' evolving political views. Metaxas supported the failed counterrevolution by monarchists against the republican-oriented government on October 23, 1923; the counterrevolution collapsed within a week, and an arrest warrant was issued for Metaxas, who fled to Norway in exile. The pro-republican government achieved its aim in 1924 when the Greek monarchy was abolished and a Greek republic was established. In 1924, Metaxas officially changed his position from opposition to the republic to acceptance of its institutions.

In the 1926 general election, Metaxas' Freethinkers' Party won 54 out of 250 seats in the Greek parliament, resulting in the party becoming part of Greece's coalition government, and Metaxas becoming the Minister of Communications. However, the Freethinkers' Party's public support collapsed in the 1928 election, in which it lost almost all of its seats, including Metaxas' own seat.

By the 1930s, Metaxas openly condemned the parliamentary system in Greece. For the 1935 election, Metaxas' party joined other monarchist parties in an electoral coalition known as the United Royalists that called for the restoration of the monarchy. The Freethinkers' Party won only seven seats in the election. Nevertheless, a monarchist government was formed in Greece in 1935, resulting in the restoration of King George II of Greece as head of state.

King George II had held close relations with Metaxas in the past and appointed Metaxas as the Prime Minister of Greece in May 1936. Upon becoming prime minister, Metaxas made clear his discontent with the political deadlock between feuding political blocs in Greece's parliament and the rising labour unrest being exploited by the Communist Party of Greece. Metaxas quickly sought to crush dissent including labour unrest in the form of decrees that did not require acceptance by the Greek parliament.

On August 4, 1936, Metaxas gained the King's support for a decree that dissolved parliament. He declared martial law, suspended civil rights such as liberty of the subject, and mobilized transport and public workers to support him. Metaxas justified these actions as necessary to prevent a communist revolution. Numerous leftist leaders (and others) were arrested following these proclamations. Metaxas abolished all political parties including his own, ruling as an official independent. This date is considered the beginning of Metaxas' authoritarian rule, which later came to be known as the 4th of August Regime.

Metaxas was referred to by supporters as the Archigos (Leader) and promised to create a "New State" in Greece that called for Greeks to wholly commit themselves to the nation with self-control as the Spartans had done. Supporters of the 4th of August Regime justified Metaxas' dictatorship on the basis that the "First Greek Civilization" involved the Athenian dictatorship of Pericles who had brought ancient Greece to greatness.

Metaxas introduced widespread strict censorship of the press and banned works by authors considered taboo by the regime, including literature by Karl Marx, Sigmund Freud, Leo Tolstoy, Fyodor Dostoyevsky, and Immanuel Kant.

Metaxas saw the creation of a disciplined younger generation as being critical for the future of Greece and for the strengthening of his regime and its principles that would entrench the Third Greek Civilization. In October 1936, the regime created the National Youth Organization of Greece (EON), which attained a membership of 200,000 by 1938. In 1939, youth membership in the EON became mandatory, and the organization absorbed the Boy Scouts of Greece. Members of the EON took an oath of fidelity to the principles of the 4th of August Regime that included: embracing the institutions of the monarchy; support of national pride and faith to the Greek civilization; opposition to parliamentarianism and communism; support of the development of egalitarian, non-individualistic, virtuous citizens.

In spite of the Metaxas regime's ties to Fascist Italy and Nazi Germany, it was drawn into World War II opposite the Axis powers after the Italian invasion of Greece. Metaxas then aligned his government with the Allies until Greece capitulated and yielded to occupation by the Axis powers following the Battle of Greece. Metaxas died on 29 January 1941, leaving an unfinished (and thus never published) plan concerning a "new constitution" for Greece that would have created new form of government without the disadvantages of the old parliamentary system.

In religious affairs, the regime maintained previous states’ tradition of holding control over religious and ecclesiastic institutions. The regime was tolerant towards religious minorities (mainly Jews and Muslims), the majority of whom were conservative and hostile towards Venizelism. The regime was not antisemitic and it prohibited antisemitic publications by certain newspapers. During the Greco-Italian War, Metaxas openly praised Greek Jews for their support for the war effort.

== Legacy ==
The social control which was established by Metaxas and the ideas passed to the youth, especially through the National Youth Organisation, had a significant influence on the Greek society and the post-war political system. Some examples are the censorship, which was in use until the Metapolitefsi, and the surviving elements of a police state. In the immediate post-war era Metaxism was advocated by the 4th of August Party. The ideas of the 4th of August Regime was also an extra motive for the group of right-wing army officers who seized power in a coup d'état and led to the Greek military junta of 1967–1974. Today the only party of the Greek parliament which claims to follow the ideas of Metaxas is the right-wing extremist Golden Dawn. Other far-right parties such as Popular Greek Patriotic Union which split from the Golden Dawn also claim to follow Metaxism.

== See also ==
- Authoritarian nationalism
