= Vasilis Leventis =

Greek politician (1951–2026)

- Βασίλης Λεβέντης
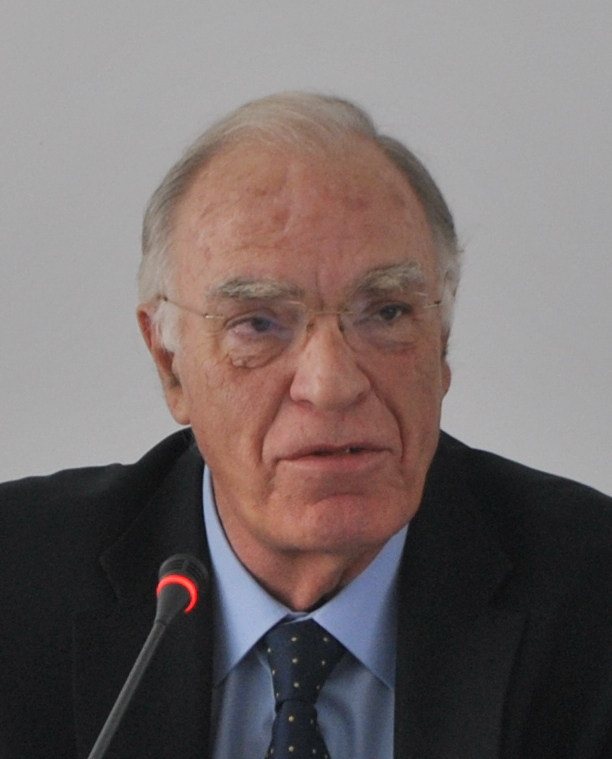
- Leventis in 2015

Leader of the Union of Centrists
- In office 2 March 1992 – 1 July 2026
- Preceded by: Party established

Member of the Hellenic Parliament
- In office 20 September 2015 – 7 July 2019
- Constituency: Athens B

Personal details
- Born: 2 November 1951 Messini, Messenia, Greece
- Died: 1 July 2026 (aged 74) Athens, Greece
- Party: Union of Centrists
- Other political affiliations: PASOK (1974–81); Free Party (1984–89); New Democracy (1989); Ecologists Pacifists Greens (1990–92)
- Education: NTUA; LMU Munich

Military service
- Allegiance: Greece
- Branch: Hellenic Navy
- Years: 1975–1978
- Rank: Assistant Ensign

Vasileios "Vasilis" Leventis (Greek: Βασίλειος "Βασίλης" Λεβέντης, pronounced [vaˈsili.os vaˈsilis leˈvendis]; 2 November 1951 – 1 July 2026) was a Greek politician who served as leader of the Union of Centrists from 1992 to 2026, and as Member of the Hellenic Parliament from 2015 to 2019.

== Early life ==
Vassilis Leventis was the fourth child of Apostolos and Gregoria Leventis, who were originally from Korakovouni, a small village in Arcadia. The Leventis family moved to Piraeus, where Vassilis Leventis attended high school. In 1969 Leventis graduated from school and was admitted as the 6th highest-ranking candidate to the Civil Engineering department of the National Technical University of Athens. During the 1970s he ventured into discography, funding and producing a one time record.

His first involvement with politics occurred in 1975 when, as an assistant of the then-dean of Athens Polytechnic University, Kyprianos Biris, he contributed to the composition of articles 21 and 24 of the Greek Constitution.

He was fluent in German and had an adequate understanding of the English language.

== Political career ==
Leventis began his political career in 1974 as a founding father of the PASOK, representing the party as a parliamentary candidate. In 1981, he expressed many disagreements with the party, blaming it for a divergence from its original views, and left it that year. In 1982, he was a candidate for mayor of Piraeus.

In 1984, he founded the first ecological party in Greece, which he named Eleftheroi ("Free"). This party participated in the European Parliamentary Elections of that year, gaining only 0.15% of the vote. In 1986, he stood for the office of mayor of Athens, gaining 0.57% of the vote.

In the national legislative election of 1989, Leventis was a candidate for New Democracy, but with 5,212 preference votes he ranked only 29th out of 31 candidates and was not elected. He moved on to establish the Ecologists Pacifists Greens in 1990, participating in the Greek parliamentary elections that same year, but again failed to be elected.

In 1992, Leventis collaborated with the Center-Democratic Party of Greece to form the Union of Centrists, which aimed to become "the political continuance of the centrist expression in Greece". Leventis sought to embrace the legacy of several great politicians of the past, such as Georgios Papandreou and Eleftherios Venizelos. Until 2015 the party's influence was marginal, with 1.79% of the total vote in the January 2015 legislative election being its highest share, which failed to secure it entry to parliament. In the September 2015 legislative election, however, the party cleared the 3% threshold in the Greek parliament for the first time after it won 186,457 votes (3.43%), electing 9 MPs.

== Television career ==
In 1990, Leventis founded the television channel Channel 67, which was renamed in 1993 to Channel 40: Social and Ecological Television of Greece due to transfer of the channel's frequency to 40 UHF. The channel was sold in late 2000 to publisher George Kouris, and was renamed Extra Channel on 8 January 2001; it was later sold again to entrepreneur Phillip Vriones and was renamed Extra Channel 3 in August 2003. Leventis himself hosted a political show on the channel from 2000 to 2016, titled Politikos Marathonis, which was broadcast on a weekly basis.

== Political views ==
Leventis expressed his political opinion through his Antidiaplokí (Αντιδιαπλοκή, anti-corruption) quarterly newspaper and his television show that had been hosted on several stations so far, such as PellaTV and Extra Channel.

His views were placed in the center of the political spectrum, with particular emphasis on policies that are "rational", transparent, opposed to corruption, in favor of weaker social groups (workers, pensioners, farmers, single parents, etc.), hostile to the concentration of power in the hands of only a few individuals, and supportive of reform of Greek political life.

Leventis himself was unreservedly and often polemically critical of mainstream Greek political parties and their leaders. He asserted that Greek politicians are in league with big business interests who control the mainstream media, and as a result of this criticism he claimed he had been deliberately excluded from publicity, which (in his opinion) is the factor that has caused his party to exist only at the margins of Greek politics. His frequent use of expletives and his animated style of speaking have led him to be the subject of jokes at his expense, but have also elevated some snippets of his TV shows to cult status.

He proposed cutting double and triple pensions, cutting the pensions of those who have an income of 3,000 euro from other sources, firing 1,500 officials from Parliament, and sacking public workers who do not do their jobs.

Leventis's general public profile rose in 2014 and 2015 due to a viral video montage detailing his so-called "prophecies", which are said to have accurately predicted Greece's current financial crisis from as far back as 1993.

== Death ==
Leventis died on 1 July 2026, at the age of 74. His death was announced by his son in a social media post.
