= Ioannis Lagos =

Greek politician

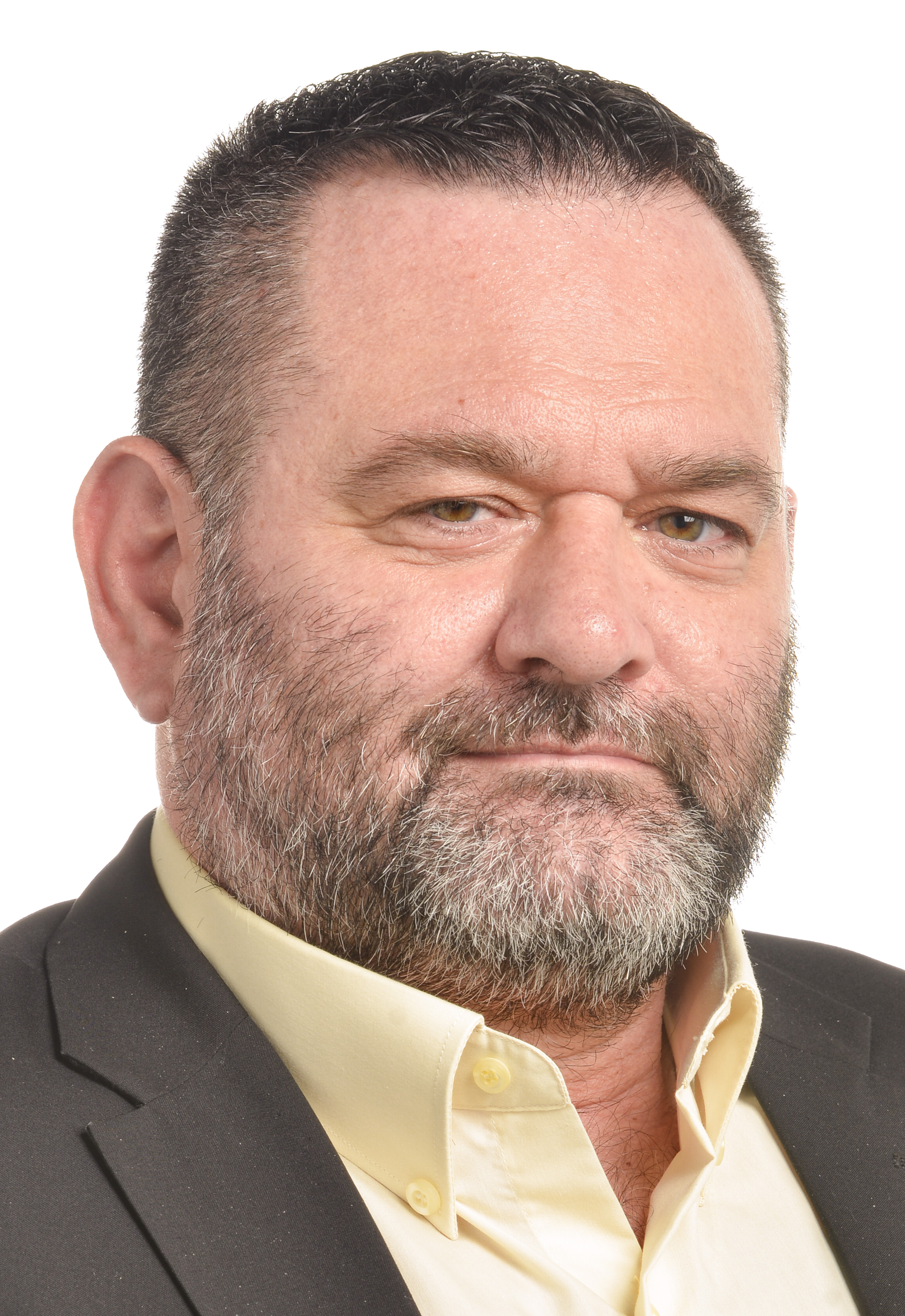

Leader of National Popular Consciousness
- In office 9 November 2019 – 10 February 2023
- Preceded by: Party established
- Succeeded by: Party dissolved

Member of the European Parliament for Greece
- In office 2 July 2019 – 16 July 2024

Member of the Hellenic Parliament for Piraeus B
- In office 6 May 2012 – 2 July 2019

Personal details
- Born: 7 September 1972 (age 53) Piraeus, Greece
- Party: Independent (since 2023); National Popular Consciousness (2019–2023)
- Other political affiliations: Alliance for Peace and Freedom (2019–2023); Golden Dawn (until 2019)

Ioannis (Giannis) Lagos (Greek: Ιωάννης (Γιάννης) Λαγός; born 7 September 1972) is a Greek convicted criminal and far-right politician who served as a Member of the European Parliament (MEP) for Greece from 2019 to 2024. At the time of his election, Lagos was a member of the Greek neo-Nazi and ultranationalist political party and criminal organization Golden Dawn.

He had been a member of the Hellenic Parliament for the Piraeus B constituency from May 2012 until his election as an MEP.

On 7 October 2020, Lagos was found guilty of running Golden Dawn, and a number of other serious offences, including orchestrating the fatal stabbing of Pavlos Fyssas and many violent attacks on migrants and left-wing political opponents. Subsequently, he was sentenced to 13 years in jail.

== Political career ==
He has served for a number of years as a member of the Hellenic Parliament for the neo-Nazi party Golden Dawn between 2012 and 2019, and was elected to the European Parliament on the party's ticket before announcing that he would sit as an independent a few days after being sworn in as an MEP on 2 July 2019. He and other former Golden Dawn MPs and members founded a splinter party on 9 November 2019.

On 2 March 2022, he was one of 13 MEPs who voted against condemning the Russian invasion of Ukraine.

=== Anti-Turkish notions ===
In January 2020, Lagos tore down the flag of Turkey during a speech at the European Parliament on illegal migration, accusing Turkey of sending illegal immigrants to Greece. The action received criticism from Turkish and Greek officials, including Turkish Minister of Foreign Affairs Mevlüt Çavuşoğlu and the Greek Ministry of Foreign Affairs. He was later fined by the European Parliament for his actions.

== Criminal activities ==
His actions with Golden Dawn have twice led to his arrest and detention on charges of forming a criminal organization, while he is also allegedly involved in the murder of Pavlos Fyssas, which led to his conviction, along with many other members, on October 7, 2020, as one of the leaders of the criminal gang.

On September 13, 2019, he was sentenced to another eight months in jail with suspension for the attack on the social space "Συνεργείο" in 2013 and an extra 13 years in October 2020 for leading a criminal organisation, resulting in a prison sentence of 13 years.

On October 19, 2020, Greek authorities submitted a request to the European Parliament to have Giannis Lagos' parliamentary immunity lifted in order to prosecute him. The immunity has been removed on April 27, 2021, opening to his extradition to Greece.
