= LEPEN (political party) =

Political organization and political party in Greece

Popular Greek Patriotic Union Λαϊκή Ελληνική Πατριωτική Ένωση
- Abbreviation: LEPEN
- Leader: Christos Rigas
- Founded: 2015
- Split from: Golden Dawn
- Headquarters: Hygeias street, Athens
- Ideology: Greek nationalism Social conservatism National conservatism Hard Euroscepticism; Right-wing populism Identitarianism
- Political position: Far-right
- Religion: Greek Orthodox Church
- National affiliation: National Party – Greeks
- European affiliation: Alliance for Peace and Freedom
- Colours: Blue; Red
- Hellenic Parliament: 0 / 300
- European Parliament: 0 / 21

The Popular Greek Patriotic Union (Greek: Λαϊκή Ελληνική Πατριωτική Ένωση, romanized: Laiki Elliniki Patriotiki Enosi), known more commonly by its acronym, LEPEN (Λ.Ε.Π.ΕΝ.), is a far-right, nationalist political party in Greece.

== History ==
Founded in 2015 by political activist Christos Rigas, it served as a nationalist party that aimed to replicate the success of Golden Dawn. Christos was formerly a member of Golden Dawn however left after conflicts with the direction and public perception of the party. LEPEN seeks to become a moderate replacement for the Golden Dawn, it claims to have no connections with neo-Nazism and neo-fascism, party leadership rejects both ideologies.

The party has promoted itself as a party for "pure nationalists", targeting right-wing nationalists as its main voting base. Reportedly, it receives support from members of the former National Political Union, an anti-communist party led by dictator, Georgios Papadopoulos. LEPEN also receives support from members of the right-wing populist, Popular Orthodox Rally, and even its rival Golden Dawn.

The party is commonly referred to by the acronym, LEPEN, party leadership confirmed that this acronym is also a reference to French politician, Jean-Marie Le Pen who they describe as a "great French nationalist - and philhellene - leader", but also to his daughter Marine Le Pen.

In January 2018, the concession to the National Front was announced.

In December 2020, the formation of a coalition was announced by ELASYN, The Popular Hellenic Patriotic Union (LEPEN), the "Spartans" party, the United Front of Greek Ideology of Compatriots (EMEIS) and the Front Line, with the prospect of a joint electoral descent with the name K.Y.M.A of Hellenism. In February 2021, the coalition announced the collaboration of the formation with the retired captain and chief of the Popular Citizens Movement (LAKIP) Andreas Petropoulos. In November 2021, ELASYN announced its departure from the K.Y.M.A of Hellenism.

In August 2022 Rigas announced his party cooperation with the National Party – Greeks and its candidacy in Etoloakarnania for the 2023 elections.

== Ideology ==
The party claims to be based around the traditions and beliefs of the Orthodox church. The party's manifesto asserts that the main objectives are to preserve and promote Greek culture and to "convey the continually unchanging ideas and values of Hellenism and to transform them into the new generations, through the continuation of the ancient Greek civilization adapted to the needs of today, the dissemination of its high cultural destination, the proclamation and promotion of the principles of equality, equality and meritocracy".

== International connections ==
In 2018, LEPEN became a member of the Alliance for Peace and Freedom, a far-right European political party that also includes: New Force, NATION, National Democratic Party of Germany, People's Party - Our Slovakia, Noua Dreaptă, National Democracy, Workers' Party of Social Justice and the United Romania Party.

The party claims to have contacts with the French National Rally and Austrian Freedom Party.
