= Union of Centrists =

Union of Centrists Ένωση Κεντρώων Énosi Kentróon
- Abbreviation: ΕΚ
- Leader: Vacant
- Founder: Vasilis Leventis
- Founded: 2 March 1992
- Dissolved: 2026
- Headquarters: 28 Karolou St. 122 42 Athens
- Newspaper: Antidiaploki
- Youth wing: Youth Union of Centrists
- Ideology: Venizelism; Social liberalism Pro-Europeanism
- Political position: Centre
- Colours: Orange

The Union of Centrists (Greek: Ένωση Κεντρώων, romanized: Énosi Kentróon, IPA: [ˈenosi cenˈdro.on]) was a centrist, liberal political party in Greece, it was founded by Vasilis Leventis. It strongly supported Greece in remaining an integral part of the European Union.

== History ==
The party was founded by Vasilis Leventis in 1992 under the title "Union of Centrists and Ecologists" (Greek: Ένωση Κεντρώων και Οικολόγων). The name was changed shortly after. The Union of Centrists claims to be the ideological continuation of the old party Centre Union. Previously Vasilis Leventis was a part of the PASOK party when it was launched, but left and started the Union of Centrists because of disagreements.

The party strives to become "the political continuance of the centrist expression in Greece". Leventis aimed to become part of the Venizelist legacy of some Greek politicians of the past, such as Eleftherios Venizelos and Georgios Papandreou.

== Electoral support ==
A sample cover of the party's newspaper Antidiaploki.

Until 2015, the party's influence was marginal, with 1.79% of the total vote in the January 2015 Greek legislative election and no MPs being its highest achievement. In the September 2015 Greek legislative election the party cleared the 3% hurdle for representation in the Greek Parliament with nine MPs after it won 186,457 votes (3.43%). Two MPs left the parliamentary group: Georgios Dimitrios Karras in November 2016 and Theodora Megaloeconomou in July 2017, the latter becoming a Syriza MP in January 2018. The party currently has no MPs.

In the 2019 election, the party did not reach the 3% threshold and thus lost representation in the Hellenic Parliament.

== Election results ==
=== Hellenic Parliament ===
Election	Hellenic Parliament					Rank	Government	Leader
Election	Votes	%	±pp	Seats won	+/−	Rank	Government	Leader
1993	15,926	0.23%	New	0 / 300	New	7th	Extra-parliamentary	Vassilis Leventis
1996	48,659	0.72%	+0.49	0 / 300	0	7th	Extra-parliamentary	Vassilis Leventis
2000	23,218	0.34%	–0.38	0 / 300	0	7th	Extra-parliamentary	Vassilis Leventis
2004	19,510	0.26%	–0.12	0 / 300	0	7th	Extra-parliamentary	Vassilis Leventis
2007	20,840	0.29%	+0.03	0 / 300	0	8th	Extra-parliamentary	Vassilis Leventis
2009	18,296	0.27%	–0.02	0 / 300	0	11th	Extra-parliamentary	Vassilis Leventis
May 2012	38,313	0.61%	+0.34	0 / 300	0	17th	Extra-parliamentary	Vassilis Leventis
Jun 2012	17,145	0.28%	–0.33	0 / 300	0	14th	Extra-parliamentary	Vassilis Leventis
Jan 2015	110,923	1.79%	+1.51	0 / 300	0	9th	Extra-parliamentary	Vassilis Leventis
Sep 2015	186,644	3.44%	+1.65	9 / 300	▲9	6th	Opposition	Vassilis Leventis
2019	70,178	1.24%	–2.20	0 / 300	▼9	9th	Extra-parliamentary	Vassilis Leventis
May 2023	22,449	0.38%	–0.86	0 / 300	0	16th	Extra-parliamentary	Vassilis Leventis
Jun 2023	14,881	0.29%	–0.09	0 / 300	0	16th	Extra-parliamentary	Vassilis Leventis

=== European Parliament ===
European Parliament
Election	Votes	%	±pp	Seats won	+/−	Rank	Leader	EP Group
1994	77,951	1.19%	New	0 / 21	New	7th	Vassilis Leventis	−
1999	52,512	0.82%	−0.37	0 / 21	0	9th	Vassilis Leventis	−
2004	34,511	0.56%	−0.26	0 / 21	0	9th	Vassilis Leventis	−
2009	19,660	0.38%	−0.18	0 / 21	0	14th	Vassilis Leventis	−
2014	36,879	0.64%	+0.26	0 / 21	0	19th	Vassilis Leventis	−
2019	82,072	1.45%	+0.81	0 / 21	0	10th	Vassilis Leventis	−
2024	10,933	0.27%	–1.18	0 / 21	0	22nd	Vassilis Leventis	−
