= Immigration to Greece =

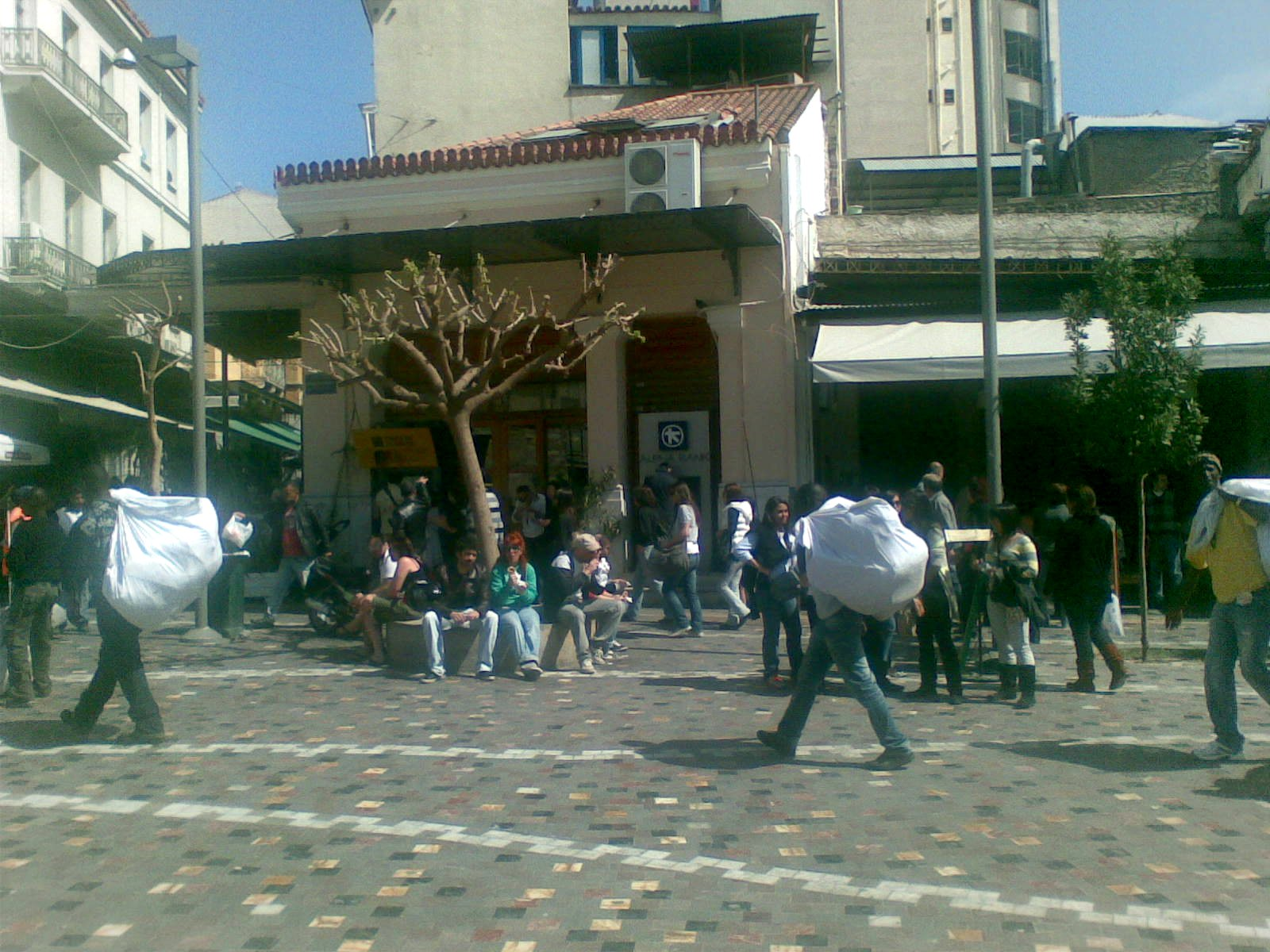
Immigrant hawkers in Monastiraki in Athens

Immigration to Greece percentage of foreign populations in Greece is 7.1% in proportion to the total population of the country. Moreover, between 9 and 11% of the registered Greek labor force of 4.4 million are foreigners. Migrants additionally make up 25% of wage and salary earners.

As of 2012, Albanian migrants constitute some 55–60% or more of the immigrant population. More recent immigrant groups, from the mid-1990s on, consist of Asian nationalities—especially Pakistani and Bangladeshi—with more recent political asylum and/or illegal migration flows through Turkey of Afghans, Iraqis, Syrians and others. Since the 1990s, increases in such flows have led to the emergence of immigration as an increasingly important political issue in Greece.

Immigrants fill roles mainly in the informal sector, and there are large numbers of illegal immigration in Greece today. As larger numbers of migrants entered Greece in the 1990s, the Greek government's immigration policy began to be seen as lacking the control and legal framework to manage the situation. While the Greek government has made some changes in immigration policy, immigration reform remains a low priority.

In 2015, arrivals of refugees by sea have increased dramatically in Greece mainly due to the ongoing Syrian Civil War. There were 856,723 arrivals by sea in Greece, an almost fivefold increase to the same period of 2014. An estimated 8% of the arrivals applied for asylum in Greece, with others hoping to find asylum in Northern European countries. On 13 August 2019, 650 migrants arrived on sixteen boats in Greece for the first time in such mass since 2016. As a result, the government decided to increase border patrols and deportations to control the sudden migrant influx.

== History ==
For the first half of the twentieth century, immigration mostly flowed outwards from Greece. At the turn of the century, the majority of Greek immigrants migrated to the United States; from the 1950s to the 1970s, migration flowed towards other European countries, mainly the Federal Republic of Germany, where there was a labor shortage in the rebuilding process after the second world war. Additionally, about 65,000 Greeks sought refuge in former Soviet Bloc countries after the defeat of the left-wing forces in the Greek Civil War (1946–1949). Looking solely at the years 1955 to 1970, approximately one million people—over ten percent of the total Greek population—left Greece to emigrate primarily to Europe, Australia, North America and South America.

Several occurrences in the last quarter of the twentieth century lead to a change in the migration patterns in Greece. After the collapse of the military dictatorship in 1974, some of the Greek refugees began to resettle in Greece. This wave of immigrants reached its peak towards the end of the 1980s. Most of the immigrants to Greece in this time period were repatriated Greeks. The immigration boom really hit following the fall of the Soviet Union in 1989, when co-ethnic Greeks (meaning foreigners with Greek heritage) from former Soviet bloc countries, co-ethnic Greeks from Albania and other Balkan nations, and economic migrants from the Balkans and Eastern European countries like Russia, Ukraine, Georgia, Bulgaria, Romania, and Poland, flooded into Greece. Many came to escape turmoil and conflict in their homeland or for the economic opportunities afforded to them in Greece, a member of the EU with a large informal market. At the beginning of the 1990s when these immigration flows started, Greece did not have the legislative framework to practically manage and control immigration. Until the Greek government began immigration policy reform in 1991, immigration legislation dated back to the 1920s and made it incredibly difficult for migrants to enter Greece legally for work purposes; it was obligatory for a migrant to have a work permit to enter Greece, which they must have obtained from their home consulate only after having acquired a job in Greece. In the mid-1990s the Greek immigration policy relied mostly on massive deportation of mainly Albanian immigrants, hoping to discourage immigration to Greece. This policy tool was largely ineffective and the Greek government had to rethink its immigration policy at the beginning of the twenty-first century. While strides have been made to bring immigration policy in line with EU directives, immigration is still not a high priority for the Greek government, even as migrants continue to make up large portions of the Greek population.

== Migrant demographics ==
Since the 1990s, Greece has become an important country for migrants both as a final destination and as a transit stop between countries of origin and other countries in the EU. Greece is a destination country primarily for migrants from the Balkans, Eastern Europe, and some Asian and African countries, and a transit country for Kurdish, Afghan, and other Asian migrants. The large majority of immigrants to Greece come from Albania; Albanians constitute 63.7% of the total documented migrant population in Greece, followed by Bulgarians, Georgians, Romanians, Russians, and Ukrainians. Immigrants are employed in construction, industrial manufacturing, and agriculture. A high number of Filipino housekeepers also migrate to Greece.

Documented immigrants in the 2001 census totaled 693,837, and undocumented immigration estimates increase this number to 1.2 million people, or over 7% of the Greek population. More than half of the legal foreigners are in the greater Athens area, and a quarter can be found in Thessaloniki, Greece's second-largest city to the north. About half of the legally employed foreigners are either ethnic Greeks or citizens of the EU; however, about 79% of undocumented immigrants come from former socialist countries, with the remaining 21% coming from over one hundred predominantly Third World countries. The number of work permits to non-ethnic Greek foreigners is just 0.33% of the registered labor force, the lowest number in the EU.

On the other hand, undocumented labor by foreign migrants is estimated to constitute 24% of the GDP of Greece. Many irregular entrants and illegal immigrants do not see Greece as their final destination; they plan to work only to raise enough funds to move on to other countries in the EU. Others come to Greece to stay. No matter how long their stay in Greece, many undocumented migrants are excluded from the majority of Greek society and face political, social, and economic marginalization.

=== Female migrants ===
Migrant women to Greece, in particular, are of note and are particularly vulnerable to exploitation. Greek women continue to make strides in education and employment. Traditionally, the participation of Greek women in the labor force has been very low due to a lack of formal employment opportunities, an overabundance of unpaid activities in small family businesses or agricultural work, and prevailing cultural attitudes in Greece about the domestic role of women. Between 1971 and 1996, adult female participation in the paid labor force jumped from 31.2% to 47.5%. A rapid expansion of the Greek educational system, coupled with increased prosperity in Greece, lead to an increase in women in the workplace and a subsequent reduction of supply of labor for certain (usually unpaid) work mostly done by women. However, Greek cultural values regarding women's "duties" within the home has not changed as rapidly as female employment has—Greek women are increasingly taking on responsibilities outside the home while their domestic tasks remain largely unabated. This creates a demand for cheap, migrant labor in areas related to household and care work in Greece that is largely filled by female migrants.

There is a great degree of job segregation by sex for migrants in Greece, with mostly migrant women filling the domestic roles left by Greek women. Women from the Philippines, Albania, and Georgia dominate migrant domestic work in Greece and indeed make up the majority of immigrants from those countries—76% of Bulgarian immigrants, 70% of Albanians, 76% of Romanian, 85% of Poles, and 80% of Filipino immigrants to Greece are female. Greece has the highest female migration rate in Europe. Filipino women are primarily employed as maids in families, while Albanian women are confined to domestic or cleaning roles.

While the majority of all female migrants are economic immigrants looking for good jobs that earn them a much higher salary than they can find in their homeland, female migrants, particularly undocumented ones, are vulnerable to exploitation and abuse. The Greek legal system offers very little protection to domestic workers and in some cases may actually increase their insecurity and vulnerability. Additionally, instances of sex trafficking are increasingly on the rise, with estimates citing that over 20,000 migrant women are trafficked into Greece every year for the purposes of sex work.

== Factors influencing migration ==
=== Push factors ===
==== Poverty ====
In the early 1990s, the income per capita in a large number of sending countries, such as Albania, was less than US$1000. At the same time, job opportunities in their home countries were pretty scarce. 86.6% of Albanians who migrated to Greece in the 1990s did so for economic reasons.

==== Armed conflicts and unstable political situations ====
Civil and political unrest and armed conflicts in the Balkans region and the Middle East displaced a large number of people to Greece. War in the former Yugoslavia in the 1990s, civil war in Georgia and other countries in the early 1990s and 2000s, and war in Kosovo during the late 1990s all displaced large waves of migrants who fled these countries, many of whom settled in Greece. Additionally, use of chemical weapons in Halabja, Iraq and the Gulf War in the early 1990s, escalation of violence in Turkey in the mid-1990s, and conflict between Kurdish people in Northern Iraq and Turkey and the Saddam regime displaced large numbers of people, who also sought refuge in Greece.

==== Demographics ====
The demography of the region is also of particular interest. Both Greece and Italy, which have aging populations, attract immigration from countries with a younger workforce, such as Albania, other Balkans countries, and Eastern Europe. The younger migrant population's inability to find jobs in their home country, combined with Greece's need for cheap labor and aging workforce, attract many migrants to Greece.

=== Pull factors ===
==== Financial and political stability ====
As a member of the EU since 1981, Greece was seen as an oasis of stability in the tumultuous Balkans. Even poorly paid irregular migrant workers in Greece could earn as much as four to six times the wages they could expect to earn at home. Even though they make more money than they can in their home countries, wages are still relatively low; in a study done in northern Greece, the real cost of migrant labor to Greek employers (particularly irregular migrant labor) is approximately 40% below that of the cost of local laborers.

==== Nature of economic activity ====
Economic conditions in Greece are conducive to the development of a cheap labor force. Self-employment in Greece is three times the EU average, reflecting large agricultural sectors, small-scale family businesses, and the existence of a large informal economy. In fact, the informal economy of Greece makes up approximately 30% of its GDP—the largest informal economy in Europe. This informal economy needs cheap, unskilled labor to survive, since young people in Greece are unwilling to accept employment in these sectors. Young Greeks have low participation in the work force and continue to study at University until they can find high-status jobs. This means many young immigrants can find low quality employment if they accept the kinds of low-status employment that native Greeks reject. This is particularly true in agricultural and heavy industrial work for migrant men, and housekeeping, cleaning, and care-giving for migrant women.

==== Geographic location ====
Greece, at the crossroads of Europe, Asia, and Africa, is not just a final destination for migrants from Asia and Africa but is seen as a gateway or stepping stone to Western Europe. Greece's large coastline and multiple islands mean that policing migrants' entry is very difficult. Additionally, Greece's reliance on tourism means that the borders have never been adequately policed (though this has begun to change, as with the rest of the continent). The evidence now indicates that nearly all illegal immigration to the European Union flows through the country's porous borders. In 2010, 90 percent of all apprehensions for unauthorized entry into the European Union took place in Greece, compared to 75 percent in 2009 and 50 percent in 2008. For these reasons, many immigrants enter Greece to try to gain access to the rest of the European Union.

== Illegal immigration to Greece ==
13 December 2015: A group of Syrian refugees arrive by boat from Turkey to the airport area of Mytilini, Lesbos island, Greece.

Greece has had problems with illegal immigration, many of whom transit through Turkey. Greek authorities believe that 90% of illegal immigrants in the EU enter through Greece, many fleeing because of unrest and poverty in the Middle East and Africa.

Several European Courts have decreed that Greece is not obeying the minimum standards of treatment for asylum seekers. One of the consequences is that illegal migrants who reach other countries cannot be sent back to Greece.

Numerous solutions have been proposed by the Greek government such as building a fence on the Turkish border and setting up detention camps.

=== Greece as a gateway to the Schengen area ===
Greece is used as a gateway to the Schengen Area by flows of illegal immigrants, especially those originating from the Middle East. Neighboring Turkey is also involved in the issue since the majority of the illegal immigrants are reaching Greece from that country. Characteristically, Turkish official policy sees the flow of immigrants to Greece as a main factor of conducting foreign policy. The Turkish governments officially adopts the "Ozal doctrine", initiated by former Turkish Prime Minister, Turgut Özal. The latter characteristically stated that:

We do not need to make war with Greece. We just need to send them a few millions illegal immigrants from Turkey and finish with them.

Most of the illegal immigrants are passing the Greek-Turkish borders with the tolerance or even the assistance of the authorities in Turkey regardless the bilateral agreements that have been approved for this matter since 2003. Moreover, the fact that the Turkish authorities are not complying with the terms of the signed agreements is creating several problems during the procedures of surrender of the illegal immigrants in the border areas. Non-cooperation by the Turkish side is also evident, despite the existence of specific proofs in several cases (i.e. Turkish smugglers of illegal immigrants arrested by Greek authorities).

The uncontrolled flow of immigrants from Turkey to Greece results, among others, in a number of negative social and political consequences: destabilisation of social cohesion through demographic change, as well as encouragement of the spread of organized crime and terrorist networks. For example, a high-level terrorist of Al-Qaeda who passed the Greek borders from Turkey was arrested in his attempt to receive political asylum in the country.

In July 2025 Greece informed the European Commission that it will stop accepting applications for asylum from migrants arriving from Libya by boat for at least three months. It is estimated, that in a sudden surge, some 10,000 migrants arrived by boat on Crete and its neighboring islands in the first half of 2025, departing from the Libyan port of Tobruk under the protection of warlord Khalifa Haftars clan.

=== Flow of illegal immigrants ===
Because of the scale of the informal economy in Greece, there is a very low demand for skilled migrant labor in Greece, and a high demand for unskilled labor exclusively in the informal sector. There is a very low number of immigrants with a valid work authorization in the informal sector, but there is estimated to be a very high number of unauthorized immigrant workers in Greece. In 1992 the Ministry of Public Security indicated that of the 500,000 foreigners estimated to be in Greece, 280,000 of them were illegal. As of 2011, there are over an estimated 500,000 irregular migrants in Greece, who either entered the country illegally or entered legally but stayed on in Greece past the expiration of their visas. Other undocumented workers arrive as 'false tourists' who continue to live and work in Greece after the short-term tourist visas they arrive on expire. Much of the economic growth in Greece in the late 1990s and early 2000s has been through the underpaid work of illegal immigrants, constituting 29.4% of Greece's GDP. Illegal employment of illegal immigrants is attractive to Greek employers because they don't have to obey to strict working regulations and social security for undocumented workers. Additionally, some migrants choose the flexibility of the illegal labor market. Immigrants find it easier to find work in this sector compared to the legal market due to stringent immigration policies that make the visa application processes difficult, costly, and in constant need of renewal.

Tough immigration policies in Spain and Italy and agreements with their neighboring African countries to combat illegal immigration have changed the direction of African immigration flows toward Greece. At the same time, flows from Asia and the Middle East — mainly Pakistan, Afghanistan, Iraq, and Bangladesh — towards Greece appear to have increased as well. In 2010, 132,524 persons were arrested for "illegal entry or stay" in Greece, a sharp increase from 95,239 in 2006. Nearly half of those arrested (52,469) were immediately deported, the majority of them being Albanians. The number of Albanian workers in Greece in 1991 was estimated to be around 150,000, with some estimating the number to be as high as 500,000. Albanians typically fill the unskilled jobs that native workers find undesirable, which are mainly connected with tourism, seasonal agricultural activities, and the domestic sector, such as childcare, household services, and the care of the elderly. Almost all of the irregular immigrants who come to Greece are employed in the informal sector, come alone without family members, and come with the purpose of finding a job, even when they enter on tourist visas.

Often, in order to cross the border into Greece, illegal immigrants have to pay a smuggler. The vast majority of arrested migrant smugglers—58.4% of those arrested in the first eight months of 2000—are Greek citizens. The Albanian mafia is the second-largest group of smugglers, involved mostly in the smuggling of other Albanians. The Turks are also prevalent smugglers across the Turkish-Greek border. Trafficking organizations in Albania can charge up to US$4,000 per person they can smuggle across, and it has become a lucrative business for many smugglers. Illegal immigrants from former Soviet bloc countries in particular also use chain migration, in which close links with home villages are maintained and relatives or friends are recruited to work in Greece and recommended to employers; jobs are transferred between immigrants returning to their home countries for a few months' visit and newcomers from their hometowns.

Illegal immigrants in Greece often face exploitative situations with little means of recourse. Article 84 of Law 2286/2005 continues to prohibit Greek public services, legal entities, and local governmental organizations from offering services to foreigners who cannot prove that they have entered and are residing in Greece legally, unless it is an emergency situation or when the person in question is a minor. This means it is very difficult for migrants without documentation to obtain health and public services from the state, or to bring cases against an abusive employer. The Greek government also deports large numbers of illegal immigrants every year, which means undocumented workers are unlikely to come forward and report hazardous, unfair, or exploitative working conditions for fear of being deported. From 1991 to 1999, 1,820,000 migrants were deported, the majority of them from Albania. There are also a large number of women and children who are taken into Greece for sex work and who are placed in exploitative situations but can not receive help because of their illegal status. There is a large percentage of mainly under-aged adolescent Albanian girls and boys under ten, for instance, who are taken illegally into Greece to work in the sex industry.

The process of regularization for Greek immigrants is difficult given the steps that need to be taken in accordance with the Greek immigration policy. In 1998, more than 370,000 applied for a temporary 'white card' under a regularization program—less than 60% proceeded to the second stage towards receiving their green cards. Additionally, over 75% of the applicants in that year were from Albania, Bulgaria, and Romania, many of them ethnic Greeks. Since then there have been attempts to reform the regularization process and Greek policy regarding immigration, but it is still a difficult, expensive, and tedious process for an immigrant to regularize their status, and many choose to remain illegal and risk the consequences because of the greater flexibility of the informal market.

Since 2016, Greece has also seen an increase in asylum applications from Turkish citizens allegedly affiliated with the Gülen movement. International reporting has noted that many of these individuals fled Turkey citing political persecution in the aftermath of the failed coup attempt, with Greece becoming a key destination due to its proximity and EU asylum protections.

== Governmental policy regarding immigration ==
When immigrants began flooding into Greece in large numbers for the first time in the 1990s, the Greek government was not properly prepared for the management and control of so many migrants. Until 1991, legislation on immigration dated back to the 1920s. In 1991 the first Law on Aliens (Law 1975/1991) was enacted, Greece's first attempt to deal with the massive influx of immigration. This law was exclusively concerned with restricting migration into Greece and discouraging the entrance of foreigners into Greece. The only way a foreigner could work in Greece was to obtain a residence and work permit before arrival. Any attempt to enter the country illegally under Law 1975 could be punished with imprisonment ranging from three months to five years. Additionally, migrants were not eligible for any kind of welfare schemes or first aid, apart from in the case of an emergency, unless they have a residence permit. This law was a failure and did nothing to curb illegal immigration and resulted only in the expulsion of massive numbers of illegal immigrants throughout the 1990s, particularly of Albanian migrants. Throughout the 1990s, nearly 2 million migrants, the overwhelming majority of which were males, were deported, with nearly 200,000 deported annually on average; over two-thirds of them were Albanian.

It was only in 1997 that two Presidential decrees introduced the first regularization program in Greece. Presidential decrees 358/1997 and 359/1997 were ill-designed, mismanaged, and made it difficult for migrants to be successfully regularized, but they laid the first foundations for an institutional framework in Greece that tried to actually deal with immigration in a way that went beyond deportation. A New Law on Aliens introduced in 2001 concentrated on short-sighted regulation of migration through restrictive legal migration channels, and a larger regularization program and more comprehensive policy framework to deal with immigration in the long term. There were some benefits to this law, such as the right to be informed in a language one understood while in detention, and obligatory nine-year education for migrant children. However, certain aspects of the law, such as the need to renew visas every year, neglected the needs of local labor markets to fill positions in a relatively short time, and almost completely ignored the fact that many immigrants would still try to migrate illegally. Lawful residence of migrants who had not already been in Greece before 2001 was very difficult under this law. The immigration law was also still discriminatory regarding citizenship acquisition and made distinctions between co-ethnic returnees and "foreigners" or "aliens". In 2004 the government decided to issue permits of two-year duration, as opposed to one-year, which cut down on time and monetary costs of applying for a visa, but there were still many issues with regularization. The small number of work permits, their limited duration, and the general policy orientation of the Greek government was not conducive to creating sustainable immigration policy.

A substantial review of Greek law concerning immigrants in 2006 manifested itself in several new laws, most of which became effective in 2007. A single two-year stay and work permit was introduced that could be renewed for another two years, depending on local labor market conditions. Laws 3386/2005 and 3536/2007 incorporated specific categories of immigrants who have lived in Greece for several years but who have been unable to regularize their residence and employment in Greece for a variety of reasons into the legal status. Special provisions for the protection of human trafficking victims were also created. These laws also included an Action Plan to successfully incorporate immigrants into Greek society based on respect of their fundamental human rights. However, under Law 3386/2005, immigrants who are unable to prove they are legal residences of Greece are still denied access to any public and social services.

In January 2011, a European Court of Human Rights ruling decreed that EU member-states should temporarily freeze any asylum seekers' return to Greece, as per the Dublin Regulation, due to the country's record of violating asylum seekers' human rights. This created the opportunity for the SYRIZA-ANEL coalition governments to use the European refugee crisis as leverage in the negotiations over the Third Economic Adjustment Programme, by tying the management of forced migration to economic aid.

In more recent years, EU directives and laws regarding immigration have shaped a more open and integration-oriented approach in Greece, and has been the main source of information, policies, and practices for developing the national migration policy. However, issues relating to migrant policy are not a priority on the Greek national agenda, especially since the 2008 debt crisis. Since this is not widely regarded as an important issue, reform will continue to be marginal at best and will not take the necessary steps to make real, lasting changes to migration policy.

=== Immigration detention ===
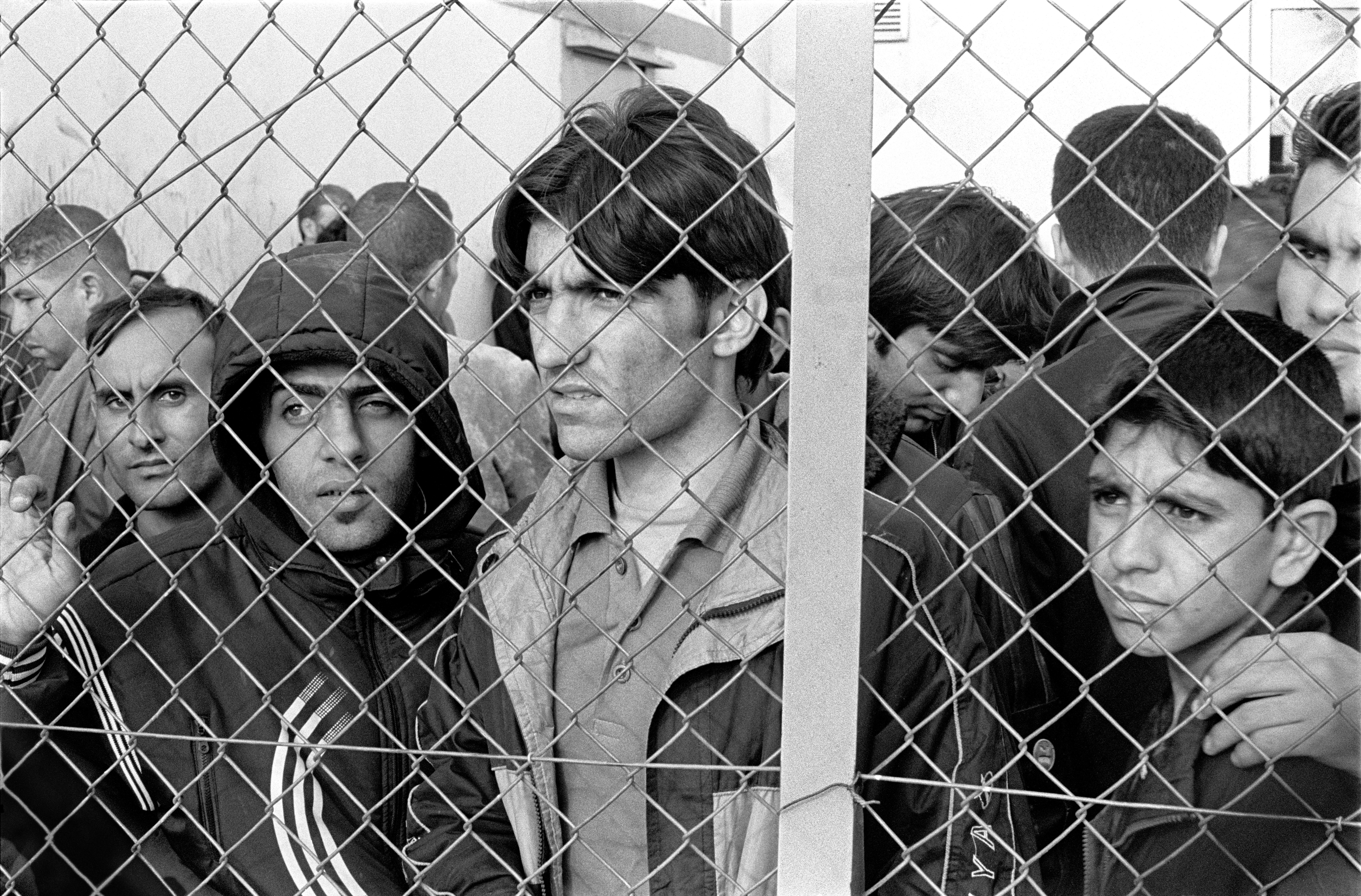
Arrested refugees-immigrants in Fylakio detention center, Evros, Greece

In late 2019, Greece's liberal-conservative government of New Democracy, led by Kyriakos Mitsotakis, announced the creation of five closed, pre-departure detention centers for refugees and immigrants, located on the Aegean islands of Leros, Chios, Lesvos, Kos, and Samos. Hosting over 20,000 immigrants, the islands will be compensated with a 30% VAT reduction. Ten other closed detention camps were planned as of 2019.

== Public reaction to immigration ==
In 1989, Greeks were presented by the Eurobarometer as the people most tolerant of foreigners in all the EU. However, political instability and warfare in the Balkans in the early 1990s made the Greeks begin to worry about the conflict nearing their own borders. Additionally, in the 1990s Albanian nationalism still laid a claim to parts of Greek territory and the "Macedonian question" presumed claims by the North Macedonia to both Greek territory and national culture. These political developments revived many feelings of nationalism in Greece, and the influx of immigrants in the 1990s challenged the collective image of Greece as an ethnically homogeneous society. The Greek nation-state is strongly tied to an ethnically based identity that centers on common ancestry, language, and Orthodox religion. The rise of immigration in the 1990, then, was seen not just as a source of potential economic upheaval, but as a threat to the cultural and ethnic purity and authenticity of the Greek nation.

Since the influx of immigrants began in the early 1990s, the number of Greeks who felt that the number of immigrants living in Greece was "too high" skyrocketed, from 29% in 1991, to 45% in 1992, to 57% in 1993, and 69.2% in 1994. Approximately 85-90% also believe that immigrants are responsible for increased levels of crime and unemployment. Greece is presented in the Eurobarometer in 2015 to have somewhat more racist opinions than the EU average (e.g. 67% comfortable working with a Muslim vs 71% EU average), the same study displays the minorities in Greece to feel the least discriminated against in all of Europe. Also, the ratio of unemployment between foreigners in Greece and native born citizens is lower than the EU average (as reported by eurostat), indicating that Greece is less discriminating against foreigners in the labor market than EU as a whole. According to a book by Gabriella Lazaridis, Greeks hold very low opinions and stereotypical ideas about many groups of immigrants, particularly Albanians, Muslims, and Turks, due to historical preconditions. The illegal activities of some foreigners, particularly some Albanians and the Albanian mafia has contributed to these notions. Lazaridis asserts that this has helped to perpetuate the "dangerous Albanian" stereotype, which contributes to exclusion of Albanian immigrants, legal or illegal, from economic, social, and spatial spheres of Greek life. Despite this, Albanians have had a long history of Hellenisation, assimilation and integration in Greece. Compared to other immigrants, Albanian nationals are more likely to naturalise as Greek citizens and are better integrated in mainstream Greek society.

Many Greeks hold mixed views on immigration to their country; they often complain about the phenomenon, whereas they sympathise with certain individuals who are acquaintances of theirs. Still, even with a population made up of 7% immigrants— possibly even more when one includes estimate on the number of undocumented migrants— some Greeks still believe that their country is extremely homogeneous. Lazaridis comments that this can lead to the continued exploitation of migrants and foreigners who are seen as "others" and are not afforded the same rights as Greek citizens.

== Nansen Refugee Award ==
In 1998, Greek volunteers were awarded the Nansen Refugee Award by the United Nations High Commissioner for Refugees (UNHCR). Volunteers of "The Hellenic Rescue Team" and Efi Latsoudi of "PIKPA village" were awarded for their tireless voluntary efforts to aid refugees arriving in Greece during the European refugee crisis.

== Comparison with other European Union countries 2023 ==
According to Eurostat 59.9 million people lived in the European Union in 2023 who were born outside their resident country. This corresponds to 13.35% of the total EU population. Of these, 31.4 million (9.44%) were born outside the EU and 17.5 million (3.91%) were born in another EU member state.

Country	Total population (1000)	Total Foreign-born (1000)	%	Born in other EU state (1000)	%	Born in a non EU state (1000)	%
EU 27	448,754	59,902	13.3	17,538	3.9	31,368	6.3
Germany	84,359	16,476	19.5	6,274	7.4	10,202	12.1
France	68,173	8,942	13.1	1,989	2.9	6,953	10.2
Spain	48,085	8,204	17.1	1,580	3.3	6,624	13.8
Italy	58,997	6,417	10.9	1,563	2.6	4,854	8.2
Netherlands	17,811	2,777	15.6	748	4.2	2,029	11.4
Greece	10,414	1,173	11.3	235	2.2	938	9.0
Sweden	10,522	2,144	20.4	548	5.2	1,596	15.2
Austria	9,105	1,963	21.6	863	9.5	1,100	12.1
Belgium	11,743	2,247	19.1	938	8.0	1,309	11.1
Portugal	10,467	1,684	16.1	378	3.6	1,306	12.5
Denmark	5,933	804	13.6	263	4.4	541	9.1
Finland	5,564	461	8.3	131	2.4	330	5.9
Poland	36,754	933	2.5	231	0.6	702	1.9
Czech Republic	10,828	764	7.1	139	1.3	625	5.8
Hungary	9,600	644	6.7	342	3.6	302	3.1
Romania	19,055	530	2.8	202	1.1	328	1.7
Slovakia	5,429	213	3.9	156	2.9	57	1.0
Bulgaria	6,448	169	2.6	58	0.9	111	1.7
Ireland	5,271	1,150	21.8	348	6.6	802	15.2

== See also ==
- Opposition to immigration
- Remigration
- Albanian immigrants in Greece
- Minorities in Greece
- Human trafficking in Greece
- 2012 Paros (Greece) rape
- 2015 Mediterranean migration crisis

General

- Immigration to Europe
- List of countries by immigrant population
- List of sovereign states and dependent territories by fertility rate

== Sources ==
- Nomikos, John (August 2010). "Illegal Immigration and Organized Crime in Greece". Research Institute for European and American Studies.
- De Divitiis, Valerio (2011). "Considerations over Factos Empowering Radicalization in the European Union". Perspectives on Immigration and Terrorism: 51–61. ISBN 9781607506850. ISSN 1874-6276.
