= Golden Dawn (Greece) =

Greek neo-Nazi criminal organisation

Popular Association – Golden Dawn Λαϊκός Σύνδεσμος – Χρυσή Αυγή
- Abbreviation: ΧΑ
- General Secretary: Nikolaos Michaloliakos
- Founder: Nikolaos Michaloliakos
- Founded: 1 January 1985 (as an organisation) 1 November 1993 (as a political party)
- Banned: 7 October 2020
- Succeeded by: LEPEN (faction, 2015); National Party - Greeks (faction, 2020)
- Headquarters: 131 Mesogeion Avenue, Athens (formerly)
- Newspaper: Χρυσή Αυγή (Chrysi Avgi)
- Youth wing: Youth Front
- Ideology: Neo-Nazism; Neo-fascism; Ultranationalism; Hard Euroscepticism
- Political position: Far-right
- Religion: Greek Orthodoxy; Hellenism
- European Parliament group: Non-Inscrits (2014–2020)
- Cypriot counterpart: National People's Front (2008–2020)
- Colors: Black; Blue; Gold; Red; White
- Slogan: Αίμα, Τιμή, Χρυσή Αυγή ("Blood, Honour, Golden Dawn")
- Anthem: Hymn of the Golden Dawn "Ύμνος Χρυσής Αυγής"

Party flag

Website
- xrisiavgi.com

The Popular Association – Golden Dawn (Greek: Λαϊκός Σύνδεσμος – Χρυσή Αυγή, romanized: Laïkós Sýndesmos – Chrysí Avgí), usually shortened to Golden Dawn (Greek: Χρυσή Αυγή, romanized: Chrysí Avgí, pronounced [xriˈsi avˈʝi]), is a far-right, neo-Nazi, (Note: Sources: Bali, Kaki (17 October 2021). "Golden Dawn is down, but Greek far right rises". DW. Archived from the original on 25 November 2021.; Heywood, Andrew (2021). "7: Fascism". Political Ideologies: An Introduction (7th ed.). London: Bloomsbury Academic. p. 151. ISBN 978-1-352-01194-4.; Hatsidaki, Ourania; Goutsos, Dionysis, eds. (2017). "1: The Discourses of the Greek Crisis". Greece in Crisis: Combining Critical Discourse and Corpus Linguistics Perspectives. Amsterdam: John Benjamins Publishing Company. p. 35. ISBN 978-90-272-0661-9.; Kopytowska, Monika; Sotiris, Panagiotis (2017). "Political crisis and the rise of the far right in Greece: Racism, nationalism, authoritarianism and conservatism in the discourse of Golden Dawn". Contemporary Discourses of Hate and Radicalism across Space and Genres. Amsterdam: John Benjamins Publishing Company. p. 218. ISBN 978-90-272-4281-5.; Trilling, Daniel (3 March 2020). "Golden Dawn: the rise and fall of Greece's neo-Nazis". The Guardian. Archived from the original on 8 June 2021.; Wodak, Ruth (2020). The Politics of Fear: The Shameless Normalization of Far-Right Discourse. United Kingdom: SAGE Publications. ISBN 978-1-5264-9921-9. LCCN 2020934796.; "Από το πιο βαθύ σκοτάδι του νεοταξισμού στο πιο λαμπρό φως του πιστού και ανίκητου εθνικοκοινωνιστή ελληνισμού" [From the deepest darkness of neo-classism to the brightest light of the faithful and invincible National Socialist Hellenism]. xrisiavgi.com (in Greek). 9 April 2025.) and ultranationalist criminal organisation, and former political party in Greece. Golden Dawn rose to prominence during the Greek government-debt crisis, becoming the third most popular party in the Greek parliament in the January 2015 election. Its support has since plunged, and it failed to enter parliament in the 2019 election.

Nikolaos Michaloliakos began the foundations of what would become Golden Dawn in 1980 when he published the first issue of the neo-Nazi journal by the name Chrysi Avgi. In this context, Golden Dawn originated in the movement that worked towards a return to right-wing military dictatorship in Greece. Following an investigation into the 2013 murder of anti-fascist rapper Pavlos Fyssas by a self-identified member, Michaloliakos and several other Golden Dawn MPs and members were arrested and held in pre-trial detention on suspicion of forming a criminal organization. The trial began on 20 April 2015. Golden Dawn lost all its remaining seats in the Greek Parliament in the 2019 Greek legislative election. A 2020 survey showed the party's popularity plummeting to 1.5%, down from 2.9% in the previous year's elections, and a peak of 7.0%.

Golden Dawn is commonly described as neo-Nazi and neo-fascist. While the group has rejected these labels, its members have expressed admiration for the former Greek dictators Ioannis Metaxas of the 4th of August Regime (1936–1941) and Georgios Papadopoulos of the Regime of the Colonels (1967–1974). Moreover, Michaloliakos, the group's founder and self-declared "Führer", advocates Holocaust denial, and is an ardent supporter of Adolf Hitler. Golden Dawn also uses meander-like symbolism that is very similar to that of the Nazis, Nazi salutes, and blood-and-soil slogans, and has also praised figures of Nazi Germany. The group is racist and xenophobic, and the party's leader has himself openly identified it as ultranationalist and racist. Golden Dawn has also been described as ultranationalist, as they support the creation of Greater Greece and have been strongly critical of the European Union. On social issues, they are traditionalist and oppose immigration, and on fiscal matters, they are protectionist. Golden Dawn has engaged in far-right rhetoric with strong employment of antisemitism, Islamophobia, anti-Turkism, and homophobia. The Hellenic Police has been criticised for its close links to Golden Dawn by government ministers, human rights activists, and whistleblower police officers.

On 7 October 2020, the Athens Court of Appeals announced verdicts for 68 defendants, including the party's political leadership. The General Secretary Nikolaos Michaloliakos and six other prominent members and former MPs were convicted of running a criminal organization. Guilty verdicts on charges of murder, attempted murder, and violent attacks on immigrants and left-wing political opponents were delivered, and the leadership was sent to prison.

== History ==
=== 1980–2005 ===
In December 1980, Nikolaos Michaloliakos and a group of supporters launched Chrysi Avgi magazine. Michaloliakos had been active in far-right politics for many years, having been arrested several times for politically motivated offences, such as beatings and illegal possession of explosive materials, which led to his discharge from the military. While he was in prison, Michaloliakos met the leaders of the Greek military junta of 1967–1974 and laid the foundations of the Golden Dawn party. The characteristics of the magazine -which featured the swastika and other Nazi symbols, Adolf Hitler, Nazis and collaborators, and some of its issues bore the alternate title "National-Socialist Periodical Publication"- and of the organisation were clearly aligned to Neo-Nazism. Chrysi Avgi magazine ceased publication in April 1984, when Michaloliakos joined the National Political Union and took over the leadership of its youth section. In January 1985, he broke away from the National Political Union and founded the Popular National Movement – Golden Dawn, which was officially recognised as a political party in 1993.

Golden Dawn remained largely on the margins of far-right politics until the Macedonia naming dispute in 1991 and 1992. On 10 October 1992, during a massive demonstration against the use of the name Macedonia by the then-Republic of Macedonia, about 30 Golden Dawn members attacked students at the Athens University of Economics and Business occupation, a housing squat and two members of a leftist organisation, OSE. 9 Golden Dawn members were arrested by the police, but released without charges, and a Golden Dawn's press release assumed responsibility for clashing with "organised anti-national elements". Around the same time, the first far-right street gangs appeared under the leadership of Giannis Giannopoulos, a former military officer who was involved with the South African neo-Nazi Afrikaner Weerstandsbeweging (AWB) during the 1980s. After the events of 1991 and 1992, Golden Dawn had gained a stable membership of more than 200 members, and Giannopoulos rose within the party hierarchy. Golden Dawn ran in the 1994 European Parliament election, gaining 7,264 votes nationwide; 0.1% of the votes cast.

During the 1980s, the party embraced Hellenic Neopagan beliefs, praised the Twelve Olympians and described Marxism and liberalism as "the ideological carriers of Judeo-Christianity". After the party went through ideological changes, it later endorsed Greek Orthodox Christianity.

During the Bosnian War, Golden Dawn members participated in the Greek Volunteer Guard (GVG), part of the Drina Corps of the Army of Republika Srpska. A few GVG volunteers were present in Srebrenica during the Srebrenica massacre, and they raised a Greek flag at a ruined church after the fall of the town. Spiros Tzanopoulos, a GVG sergeant who took part in the attack against Srebrenica, said many of the Greek volunteers participated in the war because they were members of Golden Dawn. Golden Dawn members in the GVG were decorated by Radovan Karadžić. According to Charis Kousoumvris, a former member of Golden Dawn, those who were decorated later left the party.

In April 1996, Giannopoulos represented the party at a pan-European convention of far-right nationalist parties in Moscow, where he presented a bust of Alexander the Great to Liberal Democratic Party of Russia leader Vladimir Zhirinovsky for his birthday. Golden Dawn participated in the 1996 legislative election in September, receiving 4,487 votes nationwide; 0.07% of the votes cast. In October 1997, Giannopoulos published an article in Chrysi Avgi magazine calling for nationalist vigilantism against immigrants and liberals. In 1998, a prominent party member, Antonios Androutsopoulos, assaulted Dimitris Kousouris, a left-wing student activist. The resulting media attention, along with internal party conflicts (due to poor results in the 1996 elections), led some of its most extreme members to gradually fade from official party affairs.

Androutsopoulos finally surrendered in 2005 and was convicted of the attempted murder of Kousouris and another two left-wing activists, for which he received a 21-year prison term. The other members of the squad that attacked Kousouris were never prosecuted. In March 2009, Androutsopoulos appealed his sentence and had it reduced to 12 years but was released from prison a few months later. Golden Dawn continued to hold rallies and marches, and it ran in the 1999 European election in an alliance with the Front Line party, gaining 48,532 votes nationwide; 0.75% of the votes cast. In 2005, Eleftherotypia reported that Golden Dawn members distributed homophobic flyers during the first Athens pride parade.

=== 2005–2019 ===
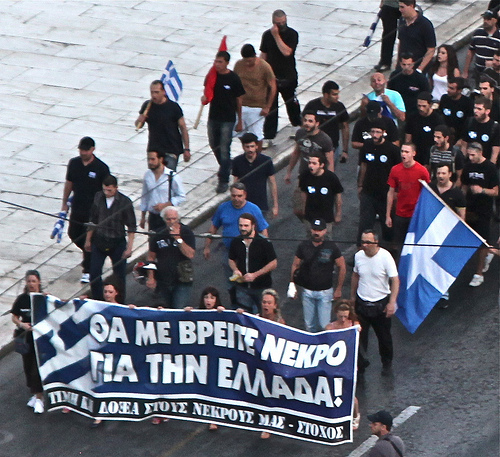
Golden Dawn demonstration in 2012, with some of the demonstrators carrying a sign reading "You will find me dead for Greece! – Honor and glory to our dead – 'Stochos' "

According to Golden Dawn's leader, Nikolaos Michaloliakos, the party suspended its own autonomous political activities after 1 December 2005 because of clashes with anarchists. Golden Dawn members were instructed to continue their activism within the Patriotic Alliance party, which was very closely linked to Golden Dawn. The former leader of Patriotic Alliance, Dimitrios Zaphiropoulos, was once a member of Golden Dawn's political council, and Michaloliakos became a leading member of Patriotic Alliance. There were accusations that the "Patriotic Alliance" was simply the new name of Golden Dawn. Activities by Patriotic Alliance's members were often attributed to Golden Dawn (even by the members themselves), furthering this confusion. For this reason, Golden Dawn's members eventually announced the withdrawal of their support of the Patriotic Alliance, which eventually led to the interruption of Golden Dawn's political activities. In March 2007, Golden Dawn held its sixth congress and announced the resumption of their political and ideological activism.

In May 2012, WordPress shut down Golden Dawn's official website and blog due to death threats made against Xenia Kounalaki, a journalist.

In 2018, Ilias Kasidiaris, then a member of the party, declared himself an admirer of the Italian Deputy Prime Minister Matteo Salvini and added that the only non-hypocritical European countries were those of Visegrad. He asked why Muslim migrants did not go to Saudi Arabia or other Islamic countries, and claimed "We at Golden Dawn want to give priority to Christian asylum seekers. And, in any event, Greece cannot continue to welcome everyone in. If we ever get into power, we will put economic migrants in jail, instead of hosting them in hotspots, as Syriza does."

In an article in March 2019, the leader of the party, Nikolaos Michaloliakos, declared that "Of course, Greece at the greatest moments of in its history was never multi-racial" and concluded that "The only way to stop the destruction of our nation is to fight hard in order to make our Fatherland a national state again, a Greece that will belong to the Greeks."

=== Decline and conviction of leadership ===
During the 2019 European Parliament election Golden Dawn won only 4.88% of the vote and won only 2 seats, down from 9.4% and 3 seats in 2014. During the 2019 Greek Legislative election Golden Dawn lost all of its 18 seats in the Hellenic Parliament, winning only 2.93% of the vote, down from 7.0% in 2015. Shortly after the elections, one of the Golden Dawn's two MEPs, Giannis Lagos, abandoned the party and refused to hand over his seat, thus leaving GD with just 1 seat in the European Parliament. In November 2019, Lagos founded the National Popular Consciousness.

On 8 July 2019, after the election result, the party leader Nikolaos Michaloliakos announced: "We send a message to enemies and friends. The Golden Dawn is not over. The struggle for nationalism continues. We will be back where we were strong, in the streets and squares, and we will fight hard against Bolshevism and the cruel capitalism that is coming."

In September 2019, Golden Dawn's headquarters in Athens was closed, only two months after the party's defeat in the July general elections. This followed years of campaigning and opposition by civil society groups including trade unions, anti-fascist networks, migrant groups and victims of Golden Dawn attacks. The NGO KEERFA described this development as being "a victory of the anti-fascist movement". The party's website also became unavailable.

Kasidiaris left the party in June 2020 to form Greeks for the Fatherland, which was said to be inspired by the Italian party Lega with a similar logo. In June 2020, ELAM, their de facto Cypriot branch, explained it had officially cut ties with Golden Dawn. In July 2020, Michaloliakos removed Athanasios Konstantinou, Golden Dawn's last remaining MEP, from the party. Konstantinou continued to serve in the European Parliament as an independent until 16 June 2024.

On 7 October 2020, the court found Michaloliakos, six other party leaders Giannis Lagos, Ilias Kasidiaris, Christos Pappas, Artemios Matthaiopoulos, Ilias Panagiotaros, and Giorgios Germenis (also member of the Black Metal band Naer Mataron) guilty on the charge of directing a criminal organization. The court found sufficient evidence to find the rest of the sixty-eight defendants guilty of participation in a criminal organization. Eighteen of these defendants were former members of parliament. The court described Golden Dawn as a criminal organization "dressed in the mantle of a political party".

The court also found Anastasios-Marios Anadiotis, Giorgios Dimou, Elpidoforos Kalaritis, Yoannis Vasilios Komianos, Konstantinos Korkovilis, Anastasios Michalaros, Giorgios Patelis (the secretary of the Nikaia Battalion), Giorgios Skalos, Giorgios Stambelos, Leon Tsalikis, Athanasios Tsorvas, Nikolaos Tsorvas, and Aristotelis Chrisafitis guilty of the 2013 murder of Pavlos Fyssas. The court had earlier acknowledged the guilt of Giorgios Roupakias.

On 3 May 2024, Nikolaos Michaloliakos, the leader of Golden Dawn, was granted early release following a legal request and on account of his elderly age, albeit with several conditions such as a ban on traveling outside the greater Athens area.

On 4 March 2026, an appeal court in Athens has upheld the 2020 convictions of 42 defendants linked to the 'Golden Dawn' party.

== Organization ==
=== Structure ===
In 2002, Golden Dawn claimed to have local organisations in 32 Greek cities as well as in Cyprus.

=== Presence outside Greece ===
Golden Dawn had aims to expand globally, and in 2013, its spokesman stated that the party planned to establish cells "wherever there are Greeks". Since 2012, the party has opened branches in Germany, Canada (Montreal), and the United States (primarily in New York City, New York and Tarpon Springs, Florida), and has also aimed to establish a presence in Melbourne, Australia. Leaders among the Greek diaspora and Greek Orthodox Church have denounced the group's ideology; they say only a tiny portion of the diaspora supports the group. In 2012, a branch in Italy called Alba Dorata ("Golden Dawn" in Italian) was formed in Trieste.

=== Activism ===
The party created the "Committee of National Memory" (Επιτροπή Εθνικής Μνήμης, Epitropí Ethnikís Mnímis), to organise demonstrations commemorating the anniversaries of certain Greek national events. Since 1996, the Committee of National Memory organized an annual march, usually on 31 January in Athens, in memory of three Greek officers who died during the Imia military crisis. According to Golden Dawn and the European National Front website, the march in 2006 was attended by 2,500 people, although no independent sources confirmed that number. The Committee of National Memory continued its activities, and a march took place on 31 January 2010.

The Committee of National Memory organized annual rallies on 17 June in Thessalonica, in memory of Alexander the Great. Police confronted the participants of the rally of 2006, forcing Golden Dawn and Patriotic Alliance members to leave the area after conflicts with leftist groups. Later that day, Golden Dawn members gathered in the building of state-owned television channel ERT3 and held a protest as they tried to stop the channel from broadcasting. Police surrounded the building and arrested 48 Golden Dawn members.

In September 2005, Golden Dawn attempted to organise a festival called "Eurofest 2005 – Nationalist Summer Camp" at the grounds of a Greek summer camp. The planned festival depended on the participation of the German National Democratic Party of Germany, the Italian Forza Nuova and the Romanian Noua Dreaptă, as well as Spanish and other European far-right groups, as European National Front's festival. The festival was banned by the government.

In June 2007, Golden Dawn sent representatives to protest against the G8 convention in Germany, together with the National Democratic Party of Germany and other European far-right organisations.

In June 2011, Foreign Policy reported that in the midst of the 2010–2011 Greek protests, gangs of Golden Dawn members were increasingly being seen in some of the higher-crime areas of Athens. In May 2012, the BBC reported on how Golden Dawn had become sort of a local 'Robin Hood' in some high-immigration areas of Athens, since the party was developing a social program which included the delivery of food at minimal or no cost to the most unfavored strata of ethnic Greeks. It was reported in 2012, at a time of acute social problems, that the party offered help to victims of crime, which gained it support; police even sometimes referred people who had issues with immigrants to Golden Dawn. Allegiance to the party was expected from those helped.

Golden Dawn, as reported by Time in 2012, holds ceremonies at Thermopylae during which they chant "Greece belongs to Greeks" in front of the bronze statue of the Spartan king Leonidas, who fell at the Battle of Thermopylae in 480 BC against the Achaemenid Persians.

== Program ==
After being founded in 1985, Golden Dawn first received significant attention in 1991, and in 1993 registered as a political party. By this time, Golden Dawn had adopted several southern Balkan-focused regional objectives as its main programme: to promote the idea of a Greater Greece through the expansion of Greek territory into Northern Epirus, Macedonia, and Northern and Eastern Thrace, and ultimately the reconquest of Istanbul and western Anatolia. They seek the complete Hellenisation of Greek Macedonia and Western Thrace through the expulsion of Northern Greece's last remaining Slavic-speaking minority and the Turkish-speaking Muslim minority of East Macedonia and Thrace. They also aspire "to combat Islam in the region", such as through contributing fighters to the Greek Volunteer Guard that helped capture Srebrenica during the Bosnian War.

By the mid-2000s, Golden Dawn had redirected its attention to opposing non-European, and particularly Muslim, immigration into southern Greece and Athens. Golden Dawn temporarily ceased political operations in 2005 and was absorbed by the Patriotic Alliance. The Alliance, in turn, ceased operations after Michaloliakos withdrew support in the spring of 2007. Golden Dawn held its sixth congress in March 2007, where party officials announced the resumption of political activities. At local elections in November 2010, Golden Dawn got 5.3% of the vote in the municipality of Athens, winning a seat on the Athens City Council. In some neighbourhoods with large immigrant communities, its vote reached 20%.

The party ran a campaign during the May 2012 Greek national elections based on concerns about unemployment, austerity, the economy, and immigration, which gained a large increase in support from the Greek electorate. It received 7% of the popular vote, enough for the party to enter the Hellenic Parliament for the first time with 21 seats. Following a second election in June 2012, this was reduced to 18 seats. The party was reduced further to 17 seats following the January 2015 Greek national elections, but still became the third largest party in Parliament.

The party is hard Eurosceptic and also anti-globalisation.

=== National Plan ===
In 2015, Golden Dawn outlined their 'National Plan' for the recovery from the Greek government-debt crisis as follows:

- Increase agricultural production and manufacturing.
- Reward hard work and implement a meritocracy.
- Exploit Greece's oil, gas, and precious metal reserves.
- Audit and erase part of the national debt, which they deem illegal.
- Demand that the German government repay a loan that was forced upon Greece during the Axis occupation.
- Form free trade agreements with Russia, Iran, and China; and remove the "red tape" blocking trade.
- Proclaim Greece's exclusive economic zone.
- Expand Greece's territorial waters to 12 nautical miles as defined by UNCLOS.
- Repeal members of parliament's immunity to criminal prosecution, arrest, and detention while in office.
- Remove party funding obtained from taxes and rely instead on donations.
- Reduce the size of the Hellenic Parliament to 180 members.
- Dissolve any existing plutocracy.
- Provide tax relief for investors, businessmen, and shipowners who employ only Greek workers and move their capital into national banks.
- Dismiss those recruited illegally into the public sector as a result of cronyism.
- Expulsion of all illegal immigrants who have entered Greece.
- Offer maternity subsidies and tax breaks to young parents and those with large families.
- Nationalization of banks that received state loans.
- Nationalization of natural resources.

=== Rejection of same-sex civil partnerships ===
In December 2015, Golden Dawn was one of the main groups to reject a bill to allow civil partnerships for same-sex couples in Greece. Upon the bill's passage, party leader Nikolaos Michaloliakos stated that "church bells should toll mournfully across the country".

=== Foreign affairs ===
Nikolaos Michaloliakos supports an irredentist concept for formerly Greek regions that now belong to Turkey. These regions had significant Greek populations until the population exchange between Greece and Turkey in the 1920s. Michaloliakos has criticized Thessaloniki mayor Yiannis Boutaris for wanting to name a street after Mustafa Kemal Atatürk, who was born in the city when it was part of the Ottoman Empire.

In January 2013, a group of Golden Dawn supporters attacked the car of Turkish consul-general Osman İlhan Şener in Komotini during an anti-Turkey protest. The party members also insulted Atatürk during the attack.

Golden Dawn promoted a hardline stance on the Macedonia naming dispute, rejecting any compromise solution that would include the term Macedonia in the name of North Macedonia, on the basis that only Greek Macedonia is entitled to use the name. Mihaloliakos has also called for the "liberation" of Northern Epirus, which is today part of southern Albania, has a Greek minority and is claimed by Greek irredentists. Golden Dawn supports enosis, the union of Cyprus with Greece.

Election advertisements for Golden Dawn depicted the burning of US and Israeli flags, a reflection of the party's strong anti-American and anti-Zionist position. However, in June 2018, the party's MEPs voted in favour of increased security coordination with Israel. Golden Dawn is also staunchly eurosceptic, opposing Greece's participation in the European Union and the eurozone.

Golden Dawn spoke out in favor of Syrian President Bashar al-Assad during the Syrian Civil War.

== Election results ==
Golden Dawn support in the May 2012 election

=== Hellenic Parliament ===
Election	Hellenic Parliament					Rank	Status	Leader
Election	Votes	%	+/− pp	Seats won	+/−	Rank	Status	Leader
1996	4,537	0.1	N/A (Note: Golden Dawn had not taken part in the previous election, so the collation of each other can not be performed.)	0 / 300	N/A	№ 14	No seats	Nikolaos Michaloliakos
2009	19,636	0.3	N/A	0 / 300	N/A	№ 10	No seats	Nikolaos Michaloliakos
May 2012	440,966	7.0	+6.7	21 / 300	▲21	№ 6	Opposition	Nikolaos Michaloliakos
June 2012	426,025	6.9	−0.1	18 / 300	▼3	№ 5	Opposition	Nikolaos Michaloliakos
January 2015	388,387	6.3	−0.6	17 / 300	▼1	№ 3	Opposition	Nikolaos Michaloliakos
September 2015	379,581	7.0	+0.7	18 / 300	▲1	№ 3	Opposition	Nikolaos Michaloliakos
2019	165,709	2.9	−4.1	0 / 300	▼18	№ 7	No seats	Nikolaos Michaloliakos

=== European Parliament ===
European Parliament
Election	Votes	%	±pp	Seats won	+/−	Rank	Leader
1994	7,242	0.1%	New	0 / 25	n/a	No. 19	Nikolaos Michaloliakos
2009	23,566	0.5%	N/A (Note: Golden Dawn had not taken part in the previous election, so the collation of each other can not be performed. It instead supported the Patriotic Alliance which won 0.2%.)	0 / 22	Steady	No. 12	Nikolaos Michaloliakos
2014	536,913	9.4%	+8.9	3 / 21	▲3	No. 3	Nikolaos Michaloliakos
2019	275,821	4.9%	−4.51	2 / 21	▼1	No. 5	Nikolaos Michaloliakos

One representative elected in 2014, Eleftherios Synadinos, left the party in 2018.

One representative elected in 2019, Ioannis Lagos, left the party later that year. The other, Athanasios Konstantinou, was expelled from the party in July 2020.

=== Political representation ===
In May 2009, Golden Dawn took part in the European elections and received 23,564 votes, 0.5% of the total votes. In 2010 it won 5.3% of the vote in Athens. In that election, the party won its first municipal council seat and entered parliament for the first time in 2012. In the Greek parliamentary elections of May 2012, the party received 6.97% of the popular vote. In the rerun of the elections in June 2012, their share of the vote was 6.92%. This made them the third largest group from Greece to the European Parliament (the largest was Syriza's alliance).

== Public profile ==
=== Connections to Nazism ===
The Golden Dawn banner consists of a Greek meander in a style and color scheme which resembles the Nazi Party banner.

The party is regularly described as neo-Nazi by news media and academic sources, both domestic and international, and members are frequently responsible for anti-semitic graffiti.

The party has denied that it has any official connection to neo-Nazism. Although it uses the Nazi salute, a salute used by the Italian Fascist and German Nazi movements, it claims to draw its inspiration in this primarily from the 4th of August Regime established by Ioannis Metaxas, the Greek nationalist leader and dictator, whose National Youth Organization (and later, his entire government) adopted upon taking power. Ioannis Metaxas was the dictator of Greece from 1936 to 1941, when he died.

The Golden Dawn's meander symbol (which the party sees as representing bravery and eternal struggle), while based on the traditional "Greek key", is seen as "closely resembling a swastika". Both the Golden Dawn symbol and Hitler's NSDAP flag can be described as a meander of black straight lines with right angles (Greek key or swastika) with a white border on a red background.

Ilias Kasidiaris, a spokesman for Golden Dawn, wrote an article that was published in Golden Dawn magazine on 20 April 2011, in which he said, "What would the future of Europe and the whole modern world be like if World War II hadn't stopped the renewing route of National Socialism? Certainly, fundamental values which mainly derive from ancient Greek culture, would be dominant in every state and would define the fate of peoples. Romanticism as a spiritual movement and classicism would prevail against the decadent subculture that corroded the white man. Extreme materialism would have been discarded, giving its place to spiritual exaltation". In the same article, Adolf Hitler is characterized as a "great social reformer" and "military genius".

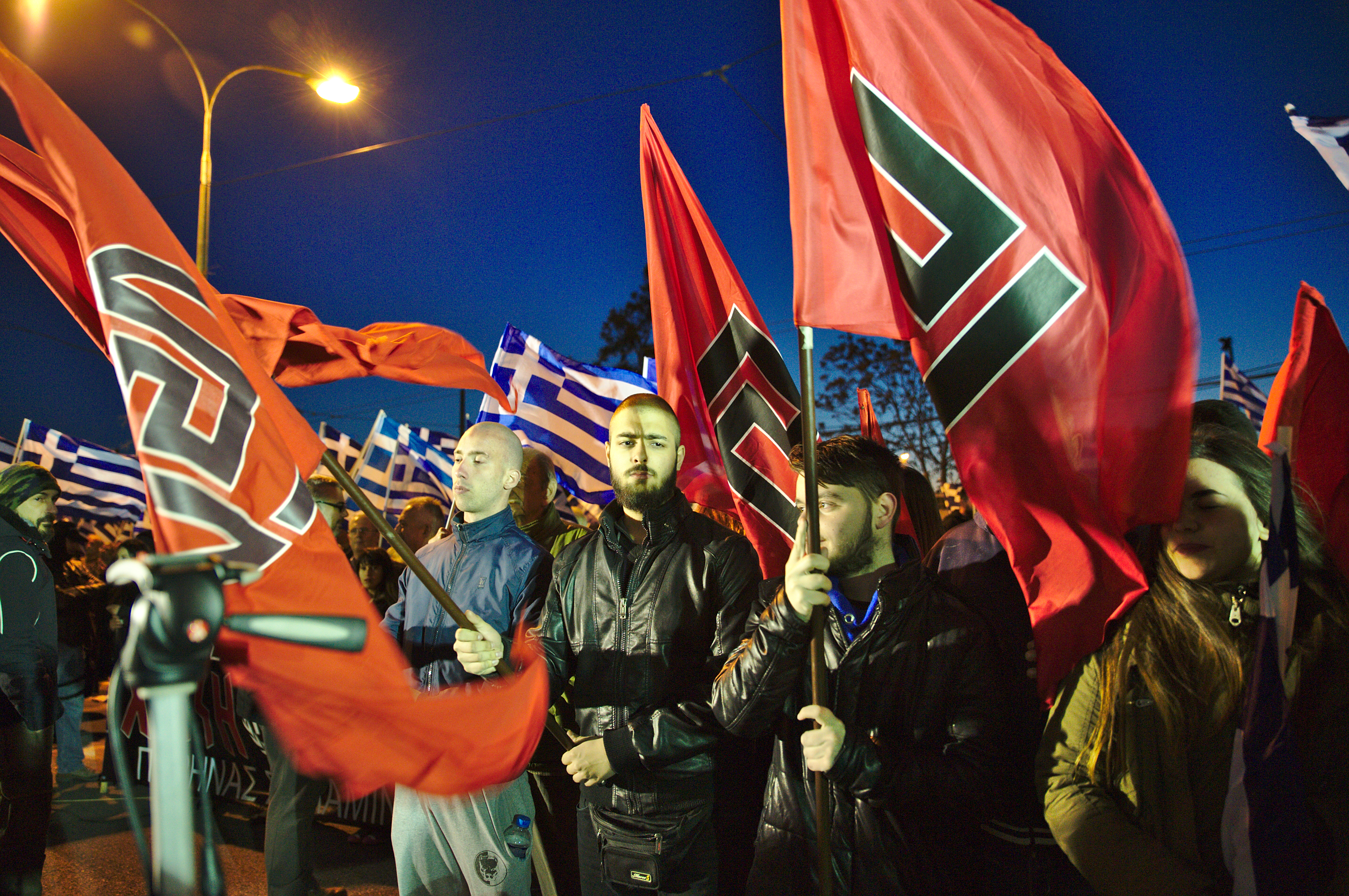
Golden Dawn members hold flags with the meander symbol at rally in Athens, March 2015

In an article published in 1987 in the Golden Dawn magazine titled "Hitler for 1,000 years", its editor Michaloliakos showed his support for Nazism and white supremacy. Specifically he wrote, "We are the faithful soldiers of the National Socialist idea and nothing else" and "[...] WE EXIST, and continue the battle, the battle for the final victory of our race". He ends the article by writing "1987, 42 years later, with our thought and soul given to the last great battle, with our thought and soul given to the black and red banners, with our thought and soul given to the memory of our great Leader, we raise our right hand up, we salute the Sun and with the courage, that is compelled by our military honor and our National Socialist duty we shout full of passion, faith to the future and our visions: HEIL HITLER!". Michaloliakos uses capital letters for pronouns referring to Hitler ("by Himself", "His people").

On 17 August 1987, Rudolf Hess, Adolf Hitler's deputy in the Nazi Party, committed suicide in Spandau Prison. The following day Golden Dawn members distributed proclamations in the center of Athens with the phrase Rudolf Hess Immortal (Greek: RUDOLF HESS ΑΘΑΝΑΤΟΣ).

In pictures taken during the first congress of the Golden Dawn in February 1990, the congress hall is decorated with the swastika and the Wolfsangel.

There are many cases in which Golden Dawn members have appeared to give a Nazi salute. The founder of the party, Nikolaos Michaloliakos, appeared to give a Nazi salute in the Athens city council. He claims that it was merely "the salute of the national youth organisation of Ioannis Metaxas".

In May 2012, Golden Dawn ran in Greek elections under the slogan "So we can rid this land of filth". During his post-election statement the leader, Nikolaos Michaloliakos, had placed a marble eagle on an obvious position on his desk, which was reported to be similar to the eagle of the Nazi Third Reich. After the elections, Eleni Zaroulia, a Golden Dawn MP, wore an iron cross ring during her inauguration, a symbol which has been associated with Nazism. In a picture taken on 14 September 2012, Panagiotis Iliopoulos, another Golden Dawn MP, has a tattoo of the Nazi salute Sieg Heil.

On 23 July 2012, Artemis Matthaiopoulos, a member of Golden Dawn, was elected as MP for the town of Serres. The website left.gr (associated with Syriza) reported that Matthaiopoulos was the frontman of the Nazi punk band "Pogrom" and pointed to the band's song "Auschwitz" with antisemitic lyrics such as "fuck Anne Frank" and "Juden raus" ("Jews out").

Ilias Kasidiaris, who has a swastika tattooed on his left arm, quoted the book The Protocols of the Elders of Zion in a speech to parliament on 23 October 2012. Defending himself in a discussion on whether to lift his parliamentary immunity over his assault of Kanelli, he quoted Protocol 19: "In order to destroy the prestige of heroism we shall send them for trial in the category of theft, murder and every kind of abominable and filthy crime." Golden Dawn's leader, Nikolaos Michaloliakos, denied the existence of gas chambers and ovens at Nazi extermination camps. On 6 June 2013, the Golden Dawn MP Ilias Kasidiaris implied during a stormy debate in the Greek Parliament that he was a Holocaust denier.

In April 2014, Golden Dawn MP Ilias Panagiotaros described Hitler as a "great personality, like Stalin" and denounced homosexuality as a "sickness". Panagiotaros also described most immigrant Muslims to Greece as "jihadists; fanatic Muslims" and claimed that he supported the concept of a one-race nation, stating, "if you are talking about nation, it is one race".

Golden Dawn took part in the conference of ultranationalist and neo-Nazi parties in Russia in 2015, known as the International Russian Conservative Forum. Participants included the National Democratic Party of Germany, the Nordic Resistance Movement, the Russian Imperial Movement and others, as well as well known white supremacists from the United States such as Jared Taylor of American Renaissance and Brandon Russell of the Atomwaffen Division.

=== Allegations of connections to the Greek police ===
In an interview with Eleftherotypia in 1998, Minister for Public Order Georgios Romaios (PASOK) alleged the existence of "fascist elements in the Hellenic Police", and vowed to suppress them. In a TV interview that same year, Romaios again claimed that there was a pro-fascist group within the police force, although he said it was not organized and was only involved in isolated incidents. The same year, Eleftherotypia published an article which outlined connections between the police and neo-fascism. Dimitris Reppas, the PASOK government spokesman, strongly denied such connections. However, the article quoted a speech by the PASOK Member of Parliament Paraskevas Paraskevopoulos about a riot caused by right-wing extremists, in which he said:

In Thessaloniki, it is widely discussed that far-right organisations are active in the security forces. Members of such organisations were the planners and chief executioners of the riot and nobody was arrested. A Special Forces officer, speaking at a briefing of Special Forces policemen who were to be on duty that day, told the policemen not to arrest anyone because the rioters were not enemies and threatened that should this be overlooked there would be penalties.

Before the surrender of Androutsopoulos, an article in the newspaper Ta Nea claimed that Golden Dawn had a close relationship with elements of the Greek police force. In relation to the Periandros case, the article quoted an unidentified police officer who said that "half the force wanted Periandros arrested and the other half didn't." The article claimed that there was a confidential internal police investigation which concluded that:

1. Golden Dawn had very good relations and contacts with officers of the force, on and off duty, as well as with rank and file police.
2. The police provided the group with batons and radio communications equipment during mass demonstrations, mainly during the annual celebrations of the Athens Polytechnic uprising and during rallies by left-wing and anarchist groups, in order to provoke riots.
3. Periandros and the group's connections with the force largely delayed his arrest.
4. Periandros's brother, also a member of Golden Dawn, was a security escort of an unnamed New Democracy MP.
5. Many Golden Dawn members were illegally carrying an assortment of weapons.

The newspaper published a photograph of a typewritten paragraph with no identifiable insignia as evidence of the secret investigation. The Minister for Public Order, Michalis Chrysochoidis, responded that he did not recollect any such an investigation. Chrysochoidis also denied accusations that far-right connections within the police force delayed the arrest of Periandros. He said that leftist groups, including the ultra-left, anti-state resistance group 17 November, responsible for several politically motivated murders, had similarly evaded the police for decades. In both cases, he attributed the failures to "stupidity and incompetence" by the force.

In more recent years, anti-fascist and left-wing groups have claimed that many of Golden Dawn's members have close relationships or collaborated with Greece's Central Intelligence Service (KYP), the predecessor to the National Intelligence Service, and accused Michaloliakos of working for the KYP in the 1980s. One piece of evidence for this, published in a Greek newspaper, was a payslip showing the names of both Michaloliakos and Konstantinos Plevris as operating for the agency, which Golden Dawn claimed was a forgery. The "payslip", which was supposedly "signed" by a "Hellenic army's officer", was a fake, as was proven in court after Golden Dawn's complaint.

In July 2012, it was reported that Nils Muižnieks, Council of Europe Commissioner for Human Rights, had placed the alleged ties of Greek police and Golden Dawn under scrutiny, following reports of the Greek state's continued failure to acknowledge the problem. In an interview he gave on 2 February 2013 to Ta Nea, Muižnieks stated that he had collected strong evidence of ties between the police and the party. According to the political analyst Paschos Mandravelis, "A lot of the party's backing comes from the police, young recruits who are apolitical and know nothing about the Nazis or Hitler. For them, Golden Dawn supporters are their only allies on the frontline when there are clashes between riot police and leftists."

After the Greek Parliamentary elections of 6 May 2012, it became known that more than one out of two Greek police officers voted for Golden Dawn in some districts. Polling stations surrounding the Attica General Police Directorate in the Athens A constituency, where on-duty police officers are known to have voted, reported slightly more than 20% support for the party, whereas "civilian" polling stations in the constituency reported support of around 6%. The total percentage of Golden Dawn votes in Athens A was 7.8%. A police official stated that support for the party was high and growing among the police, as well as in the branches of the military.

- A police officer has been suspended pending investigation while seven others have been identified for taking part in Golden Dawn raid against stalls (10 September 2012) operated by migrants at an open-market in Missolonghi.
- Following repeated attacks against the Tanzanian community around Amerikis Square in Athens, for which the police failed to make any arrests, an anti-fascist protest was held, leading to clashes between anti-fascist groups and Golden Dawn. The police arrested anti-fascists, and it has been reported that the police used torture during their detention in the Central Police Headquarters in Athens. Victims reported that police threatened the protesters that their home addresses would be given to Golden Dawn. (30 September 2012).
- Members of Golden Dawn, along with priests and ultrareligious Orthodox believers, gathered outside the Chytirio Theatre in Athens to condemn Terrence McNally's blasphemous play Corpus Christi, which was due to be performed there. They allegedly chased and beat a journalist for taking pictures of the demonstration, while his call for help went unanswered by police officers who were present. According to other reports Golden Dawn lawmaker Christos Pappas entered the police van and released one of four detainees (11 October 2012).

=== Violence controversies ===
Members of Golden Dawn have been accused of carrying out acts of vigilante violence and hate crimes against immigrants, political opponents, homosexuals and ethnic minorities. Golden Dawn's offices have been attacked repeatedly by anarchists and other leftists, and clashes between members of Golden Dawn and leftists have not been unusual.

In 2000, unknown suspects vandalized the Monastirioton synagogue, a memorial for Holocaust victims, and Jewish cemeteries in Thessaloniki and Athens. There were claims that Golden Dawn symbolism was present at all four sites. The KIS, the Central Board of Jewish Communities in Greece, the Coalition of the Left, of Movements and Ecology (Synaspismos), the Greek Helsinki Monitor, and others issued statements condemning these acts. The Cyprus chapter of Golden Dawn has been accused of attacks against Turkish Cypriots, and one member was arrested for attacking two Turkish Cypriots who had entered the government-controlled part of the island in 2005.

==== Hooliganism ====
On 6 October 1999, during a football match between Greece and Albania in Athens, Albanian supporters burnt a Greek flag in their stand. This act was broadcast extensively by the Greek media, leading to a series of angry reactions by Greek nationalists against foreign immigrants. Several weeks later, on the night of 22 October, Pantelis Kazakos, a nationalist and a member of the Golden Dawn, said he felt "insulted by the burning of the Greek flag" and shot and killed two people and wounded seven others in an attack in central Athens. All of the victims were immigrants, and four of the wounded remain paralysed. Other Golden Dawn members formed the hooligan firm Galazia Stratia ("Blue Army") in response to this incident, which has described itself as a "fan club of the Greek national teams" and its goal as "to defend Greek national pride inside the stadiums." It has been reported that following Golden Dawn's official disbandment in 2005, many former party members have put most of their energy into promoting Galazia Stratia. Galazia Stratia is closely linked to Golden Dawn party infrastructure, and the two groups shared the same street address. Golden Dawn made no attempt to deny the connections, openly praising the actions of Galazia Stratia in its newspaper and accepting praise in return from the firm.

Galazia Stratia and Golden Dawn have been accused of various acts of sports-related violence. In September 2004, after a football match between Greece and Albania in Tirana (which Greece lost 2–1), Albanian immigrants living in Greece went out on the streets of Athens and other cities to celebrate the victory. Greek hooligans felt provoked by this and violence erupted against Albanian immigrants in various parts of Greece, resulting in the murder of an Albanian in Zakynthos and many others being injured. Golden Dawn and Galazia Stratia were proven to be directly responsible for many of the attacks. According to Eleftherotypia, Galazia Stratia members severely assaulted a Palestinian and a Bangladeshi during celebrations following the success of the Greece men's national basketball team at the 2006 FIBA World Championship.

==== Periandros case ====
Antonios Androutsopoulos (aka Periandros), a prominent member of Golden Dawn, was a fugitive from 1998 to 14 September 2005 after being accused of the attempted murder on 16 June 1998 of three left-wing students – including Dimitris Kousouris, who was badly injured. Androutsopoulos had been sentenced in absentia to four years of prison for illegal weapon possession while the attempted murder charges against him were still standing.

The authorities' failure to apprehend Androutsopoulos for seven years prompted criticism by the Greek media. An article in Ta Nea claimed that Periandros remained in Greece and evaded arrest because of his connections with the police. In an interview in 2004, Michalis Chrisochoidis, the former Minister of Public Order and a member of PASOK, claimed that such accusations were unfounded, and he blamed the inefficiency of the Greek police. Some allege that Androutsopoulos had evaded arrest because he had been residing in Venezuela until 2005, when he turned himself in. His trial began on 20 September 2006, and he was convicted on 25 September 2006 and sentenced to 21 years in prison. Golden Dawn members were present at his trial, shouting nationalist slogans; Androutsopoulos reportedly hailed them using the Nazi salute. He was released after serving 3/5 of the sentence.

==== Imia 2008 ====
On 2 February 2008, Golden Dawn planned to hold its annual march for the twelfth anniversary of the Imia military crisis. Anti-fascist groups organised a protest in order to cancel the march, as a response to racist attacks by Golden Dawn members. Golden Dawn members occupied the square in which the march was to take place, and when anti-fascists showed up, clashes occurred. During the riots that followed, Golden Dawn members were seen attacking the anti-fascists while riot police were accused of doing nothing to stop them and actually letting them pass through their lines. This led to two people being stabbed and another two wounded by rocks. There were allegations that Golden Dawn members even carried police equipment with them and that Golden Dawn's equipment was carried inside a police van.

==== Bomb attacks on Golden Dawn offices ====
On 7 September 1993, a bomb exploded at Golden Dawn's offices. The attack was attributed to the far-left terrorist organization Revolutionary People's Struggle (ELA).

In November 2005, Golden Dawn's offices were attacked by a group of anarchists with molotov cocktails and stones. There were gunshots, and two people (who claimed that they were just passing by) were injured. According to Golden Dawn, three suspects were arrested and set free. During the subsequent police investigation, the remains of molotov cocktails were discovered in Golden Dawn's offices. Golden Dawn has stated that this attack was the reason for the organisation's disbandment that year.

On 19 March 2010, a bomb described by police as of "moderate power" was detonated in the fifth floor office of Golden Dawn, in downtown Athens. Twenty-five minutes prior to the blast, an unidentified caller contacted a local newspaper in order to announce the attack. The targeted building and the surrounding area were evacuated in response. The explosion caused substantial property damage but no casualties. The office reopened on 10 April 2010. The anarchist terrorist organization Conspiracy of Fire Nuclei claimed responsibility for the attack.

On 4 December 2012, a makeshift bomb containing dynamite exploded at the Golden Dawn office building in Aspropyrgos, a suburb of Athens. The explosion caused significant property damage to two floors but produced no casualties.

On 13 February 2013, an improvised bomb exploded in the regional office of Golden Dawn in Piraeus. The explosion and the subsequent fire caused significant property damage. The following morning a similar improvised bomb exploded outside the Golden Dawn offices in the city of Larissa, in central Greece. This explosion also caused only property damage.

==== Liana Kanelli assault and reactions ====
On 7 June 2012, Golden Dawn spokesman Ilias Kasidiaris slapped Communist MP Liana Kanelli three times during a live debate on the morning show Proino ANT1 after she hit him with a newspaper for throwing a glass of water at SYRIZA MP Rena Dourou after she brought up his alleged involvement in an armed robbery; Kanelli had also thrown verbal abuse at him during the previous commercial break. Kasidiaris was subsequently locked in a room by the staff of the ANT1 TV station, but he knocked down the door and left. Greek prosecutors issued an arrest warrant for Kasidiaris. Golden Dawn blamed Kanelli for inciting the incident. Public opprobrium resulted in several protests against Golden Dawn in Athens and other Greek cities. Political analyst Theodore Couloumbis told Reuters that the incident could cost Golden Dawn votes, especially among women, though other experts were of the opinion that images of violence could play in their favour—a Facebook page dedicated to Kasidiaris was reported to have picked up 6,000 'likes' within 24 hours of the event.

==== Murder of Shahzad Luqman ====
Shehzad Luqman was a 27-year-old man of Pakistani origin who was murdered by members of Golden Dawn while cycling to work in the early hours of 17 January 2013 in Petralona, Athens. Two Golden Dawn members were arrested and found guilty of the crime.

==== Murder of Pavlos Fyssas ====
In September 2013, a 35-year-old man confirmed to have had ties to Golden Dawn was arrested for murder after hip-hop artist Pavlos Fyssas, known as Killah P, was stabbed twice following a brawl in Piraeus. The police later raided Golden Dawn offices in Athens. The party denied any connections to the murder. An ongoing investigation has since confirmed that the man was in contact with party members prior to and at the time of the murder. A subsequent police crackdown led to raids on Golden Dawn offices and the arrests of several party members, including party leader Nikolaos Michaloliakos, who was imprisoned as a result of owning the office phone to which a telephone call, alleged to be associated with the murder, was received. In July 2020, Giorgios Roupakias was found guilty of his murder. In October 2020, thirteen other members of Golden Dawn, Anastasios-Marios Anadiotis, Giorgios Dimou, Elpidoforos Kalaritis, Yoannis Vasilios Komianos, Konstantinos Korkovilis, Anastasios Michalaros, Giorgios Patelis, Giorgios Skalos, Giorgios Stambelos, Leon Tsalikis, Athanasios Tsorvas, Nikolaos Tsorvas, and Aristotelis Chrisafitis, were also found guilty.

==== 2013 shooting of Golden Dawn members ====
On 1 November 2013, Golden Dawn members Giorgos Fountoulis and Manos Kapelonis were shot dead outside the party's offices in Neo Irakleio, a northern suburb of Athens. A third, Alexandros Gerontas, was severely injured. Police described the event as a terrorist attack. Two weeks later, the anarchist terrorist group The Fighting People's Revolutionary Powers claimed responsibility for what it described as the "political executions of the fascist members of the neo-Nazi Golden Dawn party."

==== 2016 attacks on migrants and refugees ====
In April 2016, Golden Dawn supporters in Piraeus clashed with migrant groups, and additionally in Chios, where they fought with police from Athens, after having attacked migrants and refugees there.

== See also ==
- Golden Dawn Girls, a Norwegian documentary about far-right politics in Greece and the role of women in a patriarchal and neo-Nazi organization, directed by Håvard Bustnes (2017).
