= Golden Dawn Girls =

2017 documentary film

- Film poster
- Norwegian: Hatets vugge
- Directed by: Håvard Bustnes
- Produced by: Christian Aune Falch; Håvard Bustnes
- Narrated by: Håvard Bustnes
- Cinematography: Lars Skree; Viggo Knudsen
- Edited by: Anders Teigen
- Music by: Jonas Colstrup
- Production company: Faction Film
- Release date: November 2017 (IDFA)
- Running time: 95 minutes
- Countries: Norway; Denmark; Finland
- Languages: Greek; English

Golden Dawn Girls (Norwegian: Hatets vugge, lit. 'Hate's Cradle') is a political documentary film on the background of the neo-Nazi organization Golden Dawn, directed by the Norwegian Håvard Bustnes.

== Plot ==
The documentary delves into the far-right organization, something unprecedented to date, narrating the events that have taken place since the creation of the Greek ultra-right party through the gaze of the women who have surrounded the visible faces from the party that, even being in the background due to the deeply patriarchal role of the party, their strong character made the whole party know them. After the arrests of the male leaders, their voice took power within the organization, also influenced by the role of martyrs, shouting "blood, honor, Golden Dawn".

To explain different points of view, the documentary follows three different generations with a very different past, such Dafni, who became a member of some left-wing parties: "When I was young, I had totally different political ideas. I was a member of PASOK many years. With all the ideals that inspire young people: democracy, freedom and those beautiful ideas that you eventually discover to be a lie." The other two protagonists are Jenny, known for her hate speech, and Urania, daughter of the organization's leader, and who has the strongest voice in hate speech and violence, not in vain, she was arrested for beating up a Pakistani in 2012.

== Main characters ==
- Dafni, mother of Panayiotis Iliopoulos, was a submarine engineer, hospital director and a socialist militant.
- Jenny, known as "wife of hate", spouse of deputy Giorgos Germenis, imprisoned in 2013.
- Urania, daughter of the organization's leader, Nikolaos Michaloliakos, who was also imprisoned.

== Reception ==
The documentary, directed by Norwegian Håvard Bustnes, was co-produced by Norway, Denmark and Finland. Filming began in 2013, when the Norwegian director went to Greece with the aim of reporting the imprisonment of 13 Golden Dawn deputies. The premiere was during the International Documentary Film Festival Amsterdam (IDFA). At the beginning of 2018, it began to be released in Sweden and Denmark, and since April it reached theaters in Spain in its original version with subtitles. Ignacio Escolar, journalist and editor of El Diario, highlighted "how they construct a discourse in which their men are heroes of the country", while Variety magazine highlighted the "disturbing and tremendously convincing study by Norwegian director Håvard Bustnes on the rapid rise of neo-Nazism in contemporary Greece."

== See also ==
- Far-right politics
