= Human trafficking in Greece =

Human trafficking has been an evolving issue in Greece. The contours of trafficking in the country, and the government response to it, has varied over time. Both government and non-governmental organizations have been active in combating trafficking in Greece.

== Background in 2010 ==
Greece was a transit, source and destination country for women and children who were subjected to human trafficking, specifically forced prostitution and conditions of forced labor for men, women, and children. Female sex trafficking victims originated primarily in Eastern Europe and former Soviet bloc countries. Traffickers used physical, emotional, and sexual abuse for coercion. Greece's European Union membership, coupled with a shared border with Turkey, meant the country saw massive flows of illegal immigrants looking to enter the EU. Traffickers also used Greece not only as a destination but also as a transit stop and a source country where even Greek women were prostituted on the way to Western Europe.

In 2010 the Government of Greece did not fully comply with the minimum standards for the elimination of trafficking. The government made clear progress in prosecuting labor and sex trafficking offenses, identifying victims, implementing a child victim protection agreement with Albania, and advancing prevention activities. Concerns remain about trafficking-related police complicity, inadequate victim identification among the Hellenic Coast Guard, border police, and vice police, as well as inadequate funding for anti-trafficking NGOs. The economic crisis in Greece also places strains on allocation of funding and resources towards anti-trafficking efforts.

== International response ==
The U.S. State Department's Office to Monitor and Combat Trafficking in Persons placed the country in "Tier 2" in 2017. The country was placed at Tier 2 in 2023.

In 2023, the Organised Crime Index gave the country 5.5 out of 10 for human trafficking. It noted that this crime was controlled by international crime gangs, mainly from Albania.

== Overview of human trafficking ==
The United Nations Office on Drugs and Crime (UNODC) defines human trafficking as "the recruitment, transport, transfer, harboring or receipt of a person by such means as threat or use of force or other forms of coercion, of abduction, of fraud or deception for the purpose of exploitation." All of the world's countries are affected by human trafficking, either as a source, destination, or transit country, or a combination of the three. According to the International Labour Organization, an estimated 2.4 million people are victims of trafficking at any given time. Global trade in women is estimated to be worth between 7 and 12 billion dollars annually; the chair of the Organization for Security and Cooperation in Europe (OSCE) stated that human trafficking may even have overtaken drug trafficking as a lucrative criminal enterprise.

As of 2010, an estimated 270,000 people are trafficking annually in Europe, with 40,000 women and children aged 12–25 trafficked annually to Greece, as well as an even larger number that are trafficked through Greece and from Greece to the rest of the European Union. Foreign men are also trafficked into Greece for purposes of sex work but their numbers are largely unknown.

== Destinations ==
=== Greece as destination ===
According to the 2001 Greek census, there were 797,091 documented foreigners living in Greece, with a large number from Albania, Bulgaria, Romania, and Russia. Ten years before that, the number of legal immigrants was only 30,000. By 2009, the immigrant population had expanded to 1.2 million in a country of just of 11 million citizens—legal immigrants make up more than 10% of the Greek population, and the number of illegal immigrants increases the percentage of immigrants even more. The exponential increase in migration to Greece serves as a cover for traffickers, and facilitates their transportation of women for work in the sex industry in Greece, also because prostitution is legal in Greece. Because of the ease with which traffickers can disguise foreign victims among the immigrant population, Greeks are not typically the targeted victims of traffickers; instead women are brought in from outside the country to fuel the sex industry. Women are brought to Greece from a variety of places, but a large number come from Eastern Europe—a full 50–55% of sex workers in Athens are from former Soviet bloc countries. Greece is also a destination country for a large number of trafficked Romanians. Although, many foreign prostitutes can be disguised easily among immigrants in Greece, many Greek women have been involved voluntarily in the prostitution industry. Almost all prostitutes in Greece were Greek females before 1992.

=== Gateway to the European Union ===
A large number of trafficked persons are trafficked through Greece on their way to Germany or other Western countries. From the 1970s onwards, migrants from Asia and Africa began to enter Greece as a temporary stop on their way to other, more developed Western European countries. Since then, immigration into Greece, legally and illegally, in order to gain access to the rest of the European Union has increased, and traffickers have taken advantage of this as well. There are two main trafficking routes that go through Greece in order to reach the European Union. The first is the Balkan Route, through which victims are moved from the Balkans into Slovenia, Hungary, Italy, and Greece, and from there to the rest of the EU. The second is the Eastern Mediterranean Route, which moves victims from Turkey through Greece into Bulgaria and Romania. Some accounts have estimated that Greece's border with Turkey serves as the "back-door" entry point for close to 90% of the illegal immigrants to the European Union, and this number includes those transported illegally for purposes of sexual exploitation.

== Victims ==
Experts struggle to profile human trafficking victims because they come from a wide variety of countries and backgrounds and experience different forms of economic and sexual exploitation and abuse. There are certain characteristics that many victims in Greece share, and they face similar challenges and dangers even after being rescued.

=== Characteristics ===
Over 60% of all migrants to Greece, legal and illegal, are female, and over 20,000 migrant women are trafficked annually to work in Greece. Approximately 40,000 women and children aged 12–25 are trafficked each year in Greece. The majority of these women today are from Eastern European and Balkan countries, such as Ukraine, Russia, Romania, Albania, Moldova, Bulgaria, and Poland, but there are a fair number from Africa and Asia as well. More than half the women trafficked in Greece are estimated to be from Russia and Ukraine alone. One study from 2001 estimates that 75% of trafficked women in Greece are brought into the country under false pretenses and, believing that an opportunity for lawful employment awaits them in Greece, suddenly find themselves sold to those involved in the sex trade and threatened with violence and deportation if they refuse to cooperate, and they become too frightened to report it. The average age of a sex worker in Greece is also lowering, and currently sits at about 12–15 years of age. Trafficked women work anywhere from 6 to 12 hours a day and see anywhere from 40-110 clients a day. 70% or more of their earnings, however, go to the brothel owners or pimps in order to keep the women in debt bondage. Trafficked women are likely to face physical abuse, threats, intimidation, emotional abuse, sexual abuse, and to experience drug and alcohol addiction, injuries resulting from violence, and various mental health problems as a result of the trauma they are exposed to. Women who are victims of trafficking also often suffer from sexually transmitted diseases and other infectious diseases. A survey completed in Athens in the late 1980s found that 12 of 350 registered prostitutes were HIV positive; in the late 1990s, 44 surveyed foreign prostitutes were HIV positive.

=== Challenges after trafficking ===
Even after having been freed from entrapping situations, victims may face symptoms consistent with posttraumatic stress disorder as a result of the physical, emotional, and sexual trauma to which they were exposed. Additionally, victims may be stigmatized, marginalized, and discriminated against as a result of their experiences. They often find it difficult to go back to their home countries, where they are no longer considered respectable women, and they find it equally difficult to start a new life in the country into which they have been trafficked.

Women freed from trafficking situations face the added danger of a possible return to the sex trade, whether because it is the only life they know or because they are not adequately protected. An estimated 80% of women deported from Greece by train never make it back to their home country because it is common practice for the traffickers to board the trains and force them back to Greece before they reach their destination.

== Traffickers ==
Traffickers involved in Greece are largely Albanian, Greek, and Russian, and while Greeks are also victims of trafficking, Greek citizens do participate in the trafficking of non-Greek nationals. Traffickers recruit victims through false advertisements for low skilled jobs with good salaries, such as waitresses, nannies, dancers, or hostesses; one study of newspapers in Ukraine showed each newspaper contained 5–20 suspicious adverts. Traffickers sometimes use a woman's legal documents and visas to get her into Greece and then confiscate them so she cannot leave. Additionally, traffickers use threats, intimidation, and physical, emotional, and sexual abuse to control these women and force them into prostitution.

== Contributing factors to trafficking ==
=== Historical factors ===
During the 1980s, the majority of foreign prostitutes in Greece originated from Asia, specifically Thailand and the Philippines. However, after the fall of the Soviet Union, trafficking in women from former Soviet bloc countries rapidly expanded as women looked to improve their social and economic standings by moving West. This meant they could be taken advantage of by traffickers with the promise of a job in Western European countries. Former Soviet republics such as Belarus, Latvia, Russia, and Ukraine have become major sending countries for trafficked women. Today, 50-55% of trafficking victims in Athens are from former Soviet bloc countries, and more than half of the women trafficked into Greece overall are estimated to be from Russia and Ukraine.

=== Political factors ===
The political situation in Greece regarding immigration, legal and illegal, facilitates the trafficking of women into and through Greece. Greece experienced massive immigration from the Balkan region in the 1980s and from Central and Eastern Europe in general in the 1990s. By 2009, Greece's legal immigrant population had expanded to 1.2 million, or 10% of the Greek population. At the time when these immigration flows were rapidly expanding, the Greek government and immigration policies were unprepared to deal with such a large number of immigrants; Greece's ability to deal with the multitudes of illegal immigrants was even less developed. The challenges Greece has faced with its large immigrant population and implementing successful immigration policy allows migrants that are trafficked and forced into prostitution to slip through the cracks and allows traffickers to hide them among the general migrant population.

Greece's European Union membership, coupled with its geographical location between East and West, also contributes to its role as a transit nation in trafficking routes. As a gateway to Western Europe, victims are often trafficked through Greece in order to reach other EU countries. Greece's border with Turkey is also a hotspot for illegal immigrants looking to find their way into the European Union; from 1991–2001 over 2.2 million migrants who had entered Greece illegally were deported, and the vast majority of these had arrived in Greece through Turkey. In 2001, 6,471 immigrants were apprehended at sea trying to reach Greece from Turkey. An estimated 90% of the illegal immigrants to the entire European continent enter the EU through Greece's border with Turkey; this migration number includes the tens of thousands of trafficking victims. On January 20, 2000, the Greco-Turkish Agreement was signed. Both countries aimed at "combating crime, especially terrorism, organized crime, illicit drug trafficking and illegal migration" as part of the agreement, in addition to human trafficking between the two countries.

=== Socio-cultural factors ===
Strong xenophobic tendencies in Greece also contribute to trafficking. Various studies and polls continuously report Greece as the most xenophobic country in Europe. There is a perception among Greeks that foreign ethnicities are involved in organized crime. Inherent xenophobia in Greece has allowed the trafficking of outsiders; ethnic bias against Albanians and other foreigners has potentially prohibited Greece from recognizing and properly caring for victims who are not of Greek origin.

== Governmental anti-trafficking efforts ==
There are several international standards for combating human trafficking. The UN Protocol to Prevent, Suppress and Punish Trafficking in Persons, especially Women and Children, also known as the Palermo Protocol, lays down universal, fundamental regulations for international organization and cooperation for combating trafficking. Greece signed the Protocol on December 13, 2000 and proceeded to completing the ratification process on January 11, 2011. The European Union has developed an anti-trafficking response that underpins the ‘3P's of the Palermo Protocol—prosecution of traffickers, protection of victims, and prevention of trafficking. Since 2000, the U.S State Department has created an analysis of anti-trafficking efforts country by country around the world that ranks each country based on their anti-trafficking efforts, resulting in the annual Trafficking in Persons Report (TIP). From 2001 to 2003, Greece was placed on the Tier 3 list of the TIP report, which means the government was essentially ignoring the human trafficking problem. As the government made strides to address issues of human trafficking, it was moved to the Tier 2 Watch List in 2004, and in 2006 was placed on Tier 2, where it remains as of 2012.

=== Prosecution ===
The government demonstrated clear progress in its prosecution of trafficking offenders, though a high-profile case of trafficking-related complicity remained pending in court as of 2010. Under the Alien Act law 1975/1991, which lasted until June 2001, there were penalties for trafficking human beings but there was no legislation specifically criminalizing trafficking. In 2002, Greece passed law 3064/2002, the first Greek law to criminalize human trafficking and outlaw trafficking for sexual and labor exploitation. Police conducted 66 human trafficking investigations in 2009, a 65 percent increase over the 40 investigations in 2008. The government reported 32 new convictions of trafficking offenders in 2009, compared with 21 convictions in 2008. The average sentence for trafficking offenders was approximately 11 years with fines. The Ministry of Justice reported two suspended sentences in 2009. Some convicted trafficking offenders continued to be granted bail pending their lengthy appeals. The media continues to allege that trafficking-related complicity exists among some local police and vice squad officers. In a case cited in the 2010 TIP Report, a trafficking victim was allegedly raped while in police custody in 2006. In a positive development in 2009, one active and one retired officer were held without bail pending prosecution for alleged involvement in sex trafficking. In 2009, the Greek police reported cooperation with counterparts in Albania, Bulgaria, Italy, Romania, and Russia on trafficking cases. As of 2011, Greece has laws and penalties pertaining to Article 2 of the European Directive of 2011, which states all EU Member States must have legislation that punishes traffickers, regardless of the type of trafficking.

=== Protection ===
The government has demonstrated some progress in ensuring that victims of trafficking were provided access to essential services. Before 2001, a person who made his or her living from prostitution was liable to prosecution; since then, laws have been implemented that seek to care for the victim and punish the trafficker instead. In 2000 a Task Force against human trafficking was created to identify and assist victims, and in 2007 the largest trafficking ring known to date in Thessaloniki was dismantled. In 2003, Presidential Decree 223/2003 introduced measures for the assistance and protection of victims of human trafficking. In August 2004, a National Action Plan was developed to implement a wide variety of counter-trafficking efforts, including collecting facts and statistics, establishing procedures to identify victims, establish shelters, provide victims with legal recourse, and educating police, judges, and other member of law enforcement. The Ministry of Health trained nurses, medical admissions staff, psychologists, psychiatrists, and social workers on the identification of trafficking victims. Similarly, experienced anti-trafficking police continued to provide training to border police, vice police, and the Hellenic Coast Guard on victim identification. Greece provided officially-identified trafficking victims with access to legal and medical services through government-run shelters, public healthcare, and intermittent funding to NGOs.

In 2005, law 3386/2005 was passed to better assist victims of trafficking; however, victim identification continues to be a weak point of Greek anti-trafficking efforts. The government officially identified only 125 human trafficking victims in 2009, an improvement over the 78 victims identified in 2008. The government continued to operate a short-term shelter, which could accommodate children, in addition to two long-term shelters for women. The government also referred child victims to orphanages or detention centers that did not have specialized facilities for trafficking victims. One NGO reported that authorities released unaccompanied foreign minors onto the street with little support after detention. The government encouraged victims to participate in prosecutions by offering a 30-day reflection period, a time for victims to receive immediate care while they consider whether to assist law enforcement, but according to NGOs, authorities did not always provide the reflection period consistently during the reporting period. Victims who assisted with law enforcement prosecutions qualified for temporary, renewable residence permits as a legal alternative to removal. NGOs reported excellent cooperation with specialized anti-trafficking police units. Overall, the government did not penalize victims for unlawful acts that may have been committed as a direct result of being trafficked. However, some NGOs reported that the coast guard and border police, overwhelmed with processing refugees and undocumented migrants, had little time to use victim identification procedures. As a result, they sent many potential victims, including vulnerable unaccompanied minors, to migrant detention centers, where they often faced poor conditions. In a positive development, the government implemented a child repatriation agreement with Albania, repatriating six Albanian child victims in cooperation with NGOs.

=== Prevention ===
The government has demonstrated steady progress in the prevention of trafficking. In 2009, a state television station aired a special on human trafficking in Greece in addition to other programs on the topic. The Minister for Foreign Affairs spoke out against trafficking, and since October 2009, anti-trafficking NGOs have reported stronger partnerships with high-level officials. The government, in partnership with the International Organization for Migration (IOM) and NGOs, provided anti-trafficking training for police recruits and commanders, police from neighboring countries, and over 100 judges and prosecutors. The Minister for Foreign Affairs provided $155,100 toward a UNICEF campaign on trafficking of children as a global phenomenon and funded an IOM-produced public awareness campaign acknowledging trafficking as a problem in Greece. The government did not run any new campaigns targeting the clients of prostitution or beneficiaries of forced labor. The government implemented a law enforcement-focused national plan of anti-trafficking action; however, the government lacked a central authority to coordinate ministries’ anti-trafficking efforts and monitor anti-trafficking results. Coordination of data between agencies remained ad hoc. The Greek government facilitated anti-trafficking partnerships by funding initiatives in neighboring countries. Greek law provide extraterritorial jurisdiction over child sex tourism offenses by its nationals; the government did not report any prosecutions of Greek citizens for child sex tourism during the reporting period. The government gave its peacekeeping troops anti-trafficking training before deploying them abroad. Since 2011, Greece is a party to the 2000 UN TIP Protocol.

== NGO anti-trafficking efforts ==
In addition to governmental efforts, several non-governmental organizations, or NGOs, are also making strides to combat trafficking in Greece. NGOs reported that government grant disbursement delays, onerous reporting requirements, and deteriorating public finances have created financial difficulty for trafficking victim service providers dependent on government funding In 2001, StopNow project was launched to raise awareness and lobby public organizations on trafficking issues. The Marangopoulos Foundation for Human Rights conducts and analyses research on trafficking in women in Greece. The A21 Campaign, an NGO founded in 2008, promotes awareness about human trafficking, and rehabilitates and provides legal support to survivors. In 2009 A21 opened a crisis shelter for victims in Thessaloniki and works with the Greek government to assist trafficking victims. The Greek Ministry of Foreign Affairs works closely with the NGO "Smile of a Child" to implement an amber alert program aimed at helping trafficked missing children. The Greek NGO "KEPAD" (Human Rights Defense Center) works to establish and maintain a network or anti-trafficking NGOs in the Balkan region that work cooperatively to combat trafficking. NGOs, some of whom received government funding, reported assisting at least 3,376 trafficking victims in 2009, significantly more than the 125 victims identified by the government.

== Remaining challenges ==
As of 2012, the Greek government has made important strides in anti-trafficking efforts by tightening legislation and increasing the services and assistance to victims of trafficking in recent years. However, the current economic crisis in Greece has vastly limited the government's ability to help trafficking victims; severe economic conditions have taken resources and attention away from the issue of human trafficking. While the country remains in economic crisis, funding to various social services and anti-trafficking efforts will remain low as economic bailout money is allocated elsewhere.

== See also ==
- Human rights in Greece
