= Athanasios Konstantinou =

Greek politician

Athanasios Konstantinou MEP
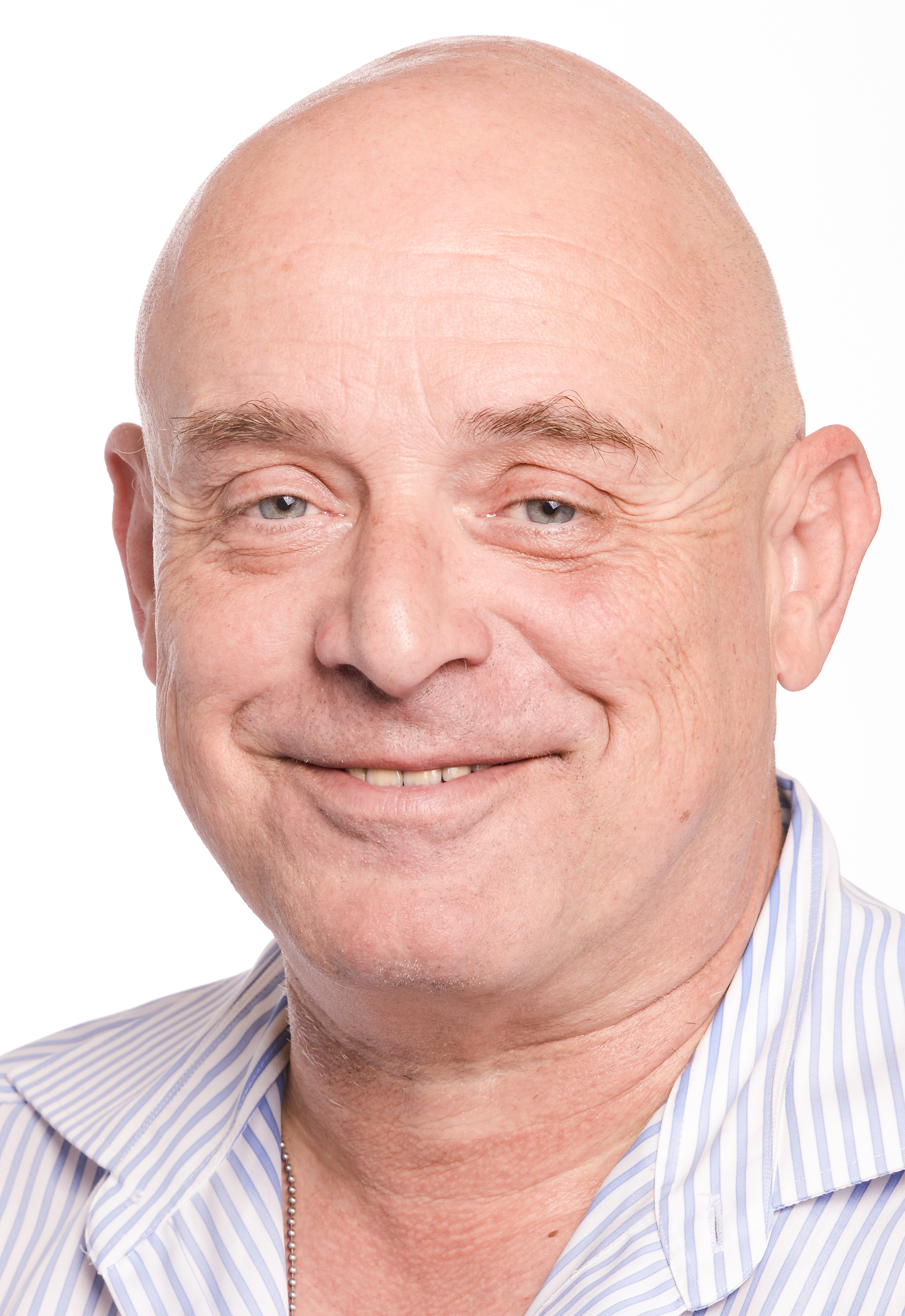

Member of the European Parliament for Greece
- In office 2 July 2019 – 16 June 2024

Personal details
- Born: July 18, 1959 (age 67) Athens, Kingdom of Greece
- Party: Independent (formerly Golden Dawn)
- Education: Hellenic Army Corps Officers Military Academy, Aristotle University of Thessaloniki
- Profession: Physician, retired air force officer

Athanasios Konstantinou (Greek: Αθανάσιος Κωνσταντίνου, born 18 July 1959 at Athens) is a Greek politician, physician, and retired general officer currently serving as a Member of the European Parliament. He was originally elected as a member of Golden Dawn, but is now an independent politician.

Konstantinou is a graduate of the Corps Officers Military Academy (Greek: Στρατιωτική Σχολή Αξιωματικών Σωμάτων), which educates Hellenic Army officers in the Legal, Medical, Finance, Aviation and Auditing Corps (see Hellenic Military Academy: Overview); and the Medical School of the Aristotle University of Thessaloniki.

As a physician, Konstantinou specialised in the pathology the central nervous and reproductive, systems, molecular pathology, and toxicology in Germany and Austria. Konstantinou speaks English and German, in addition to his native Greek. He retired from the Hellenic Air Force with the rank of taxiarchos, equivalent to a brigadier general or air commodore.

On 15 September 2022, he was one of 16 MEPs who voted against condemning President Daniel Ortega of Nicaragua for human rights violations, in particular the arrest of Bishop Rolando Álvarez.
