= Golden Dawn (magazine) =

Greek neo-Nazi magazine

- Cover of the first issue dated December 1980
- Editor: Nikolaos Michaloliakos
- Categories: Political magazine
- Founded: 1980
- First issue: December 1980; 45 years ago
- Final issue: ?
- Country: Greece
- Language: Greek

Golden Dawn (Greek: Χρυσή Αυγή, romanized: Chrysi Avgi) was a neo-Nazi magazine published in Greece. It was established in 1980. The magazine was the media outlet of the political group with the same name.

== History and profile ==
Golden Dawn was launched by a group led by Nikolaos Michaloliakos who also edited it. Then, they started a political group with the same name of which the goal was to disseminate their views through the magazine. The group adhered to national socialism and fascism, and the magazine described itself as a platform of national socialism. It frequently published articles about Adolf Hitler praising Nazism. Its cover featured the swastika as its symbol.

In 1983, a political party of the same name was established. The magazine was temporarily closed down by the Greek government in 1983. Golden Dawn resumed publication in 1984, but it was banned and permanently folded the same year. The magazine reappeared in 1986 and again resumed publishing. It was still published in 1993.
