= Artemios Matthaiopoulos =

Greek politician

Artemios Matthaiopoulos (Greek: Αρτέμης Ματθαιόπουλος; born 14 March 1984, Thessaloniki) is a Greek politician and convicted criminal, former member of parliament for Golden Dawn for Serres. Before entering politics, he was a member of the Nazi punk band "Pogrom" and once sang of wanting to burn down the Greek parliament and killing immigrants who did not speak Greek. His neo-Nazism led to protests from the Greek Jewish community when he was elected. In 2020, Matthaiopoulos was convicted in a mass trial of Golden Dawn politicians for running a criminal organisation. He was sentenced to 10 years in prison.
