= Galazia Stratia =

Greek football hooligan firm

Galazia Stratia (Greek: Γαλάζια Στρατιά) is a Greek football hooligan firm of the Greece national football team.

== History ==
Galazia Stratia has been associated with the Greek Nazi organization Golden Dawn.
