= List of think tanks in Greece =

There are several think tanks in operation in Greece, commonly known as policy institutes, research organisations, or simply institutes. Some of the think tanks in Greece:

- Hellenic Foundation for European and Foreign Policy (ELIAMEP)
- International Center for Black Sea Studies (ICBSS)
- Centre of Planning and Economic Research (KEPE)
- The Catalyst
