= 2012 Paros beating and rape =

2012 crime in Greece

The 2012 Paros beating and rape of a teenage girl on the island of Paros, Greece by Ahmed Waqas (alternate names reported including Ahmet Vaka, Ahmet Bakas, and Ahmet Vakash) The case attracted widespread attention due to the fact the victim, who was usually referred to in the Greek press solely by her first name "Myrto" (Greek: Μυρτώ), suffered substantial injuries resulting in permanent disability.

== The event ==
On 23 July 2012 a teenage girl, Myrto Papadomichelaki (Greek: Μυρτώ Παπαδομιχελάκη), was found partially clothed, beaten and in a coma, on one of the most popular beaches in the Greek island of Paros. Her head had been struck with a rock. The authorities ordered the girl to be transferred to a hospital in Athens. At first, police treated the incident as an accident, however, when a forensic specialist from Athens, Dr. Nikos Kalogrias announced that he had found semen on the girl's body, the focus of the investigation changed to rape and assault.

== Suspects ==
According to the police report, initial suspects were 12 men, Greeks and foreigners, who either worked by the beach and the crime scene or had been seen by witnesses in the area. As the investigation continued, the suspects were narrowed down to four and police concluded, with the help of eyewitnesses, that the suspect was a man who worked by the crime scene. Specifically the mother of the teenage girl reported that she saw a man, wearing white trousers and a colorful shirt, walking away from the crime scene. Ahmed Waqas's co-workers said that he was wearing this kind of clothes at work the day of the incident. However, Ahmed had already left the island to go to Athens, ostensibly because of the serious illness of one of his relatives. Ahmed was picked up during a random check in Athens and DNA was used to identify him as the likely culprit.

== Perpetrator ==
A few days later the police arrested Ahmed Waqas, in Nea Chalkidona, Athens. Police located him through his mobile phone and with the help of other immigrants. Ahmed's DNA matched that found on the girl's clothes and body, after which Ahmed confessed. Ahmed Waqas was reportedly calm and emotionless while describing the events of the crime to the police officers. As he stated, his first intention was to steal the girl's mobile phone but she tried to repel his attack. Then, he started beating her with a rock until she fell unconscious. While the girl could not fight anymore he raped her and then beat her again against the stones. The perpetrator had been scheduled for voluntary repatriation to Pakistan at the time of the arrest.

After his confession, Ahmed Waqas was taken to the island of Syros where he testified again before the district prosecutor. While the police accompanied him from the ferry to the prosecutor's office, passersby shouted slogans against him. After the initial trial, the perpetrator was discovered to have lied about his age in order to be tried and punished as a juvenile.

== Reaction ==
In the days following the identification of the perpetrator, Nikos Dendias, the Minister of Citizen Protection, announced a crackdown on illegal immigrants in Athens. He deployed 4,500 police, who arrested 7,000 people in 72 hours. According to The Guardian, the trigger event was the crime on Paros. Several news sources reported crimes against migrants in Greece as revenge, including the murder of an Iraqi man.

== Trial ==
The defendant initially convinced authorities that he was a minor, he first reported having been born in 1991, then in 1993 and finally 1995. The trial was a national news story in Greece. Waqas was sentenced to "a life sentence for the robbery, 18 years in jail for the attempted murder, 18 years in jail for the rape and three months in jail for illegal employment".

== Victim ==
A substantial sum was raised by the Greek public to pay for the victim's medical care. As of October 2012, the teenage girl was out of the coma and was working to regain her strength and abilities in a rehabilitation center. Three years after the attack, she remained unable to walk or to feed herself.

Andreas Lykourentzos, Greek Minister for Health, announced in May 2013 that the victim would be transferred to a hospital in the United States to undergo advanced treatment at the expense of the Greek government. A decision continued by Greek Minister for Health, Adonis Georgiadis. Nevertheless, private funds were required and the money was raised by the Greek-American community in the United States to fund Myrto Papadomichelaki's treatment at Harvard's Children's and Spaulding Hospitals in Boston.

In December 2017, the victim's mother sued the Greek state as the €730 monthly allowance she was receiving was not enough for medical bills. The compensation could not be taken from the perpetrator due to a lack of a bilateral agreement with his country. The lawsuit was rejected by the Administrative Court of First Instance and the Administrative Court of Appeal on the basis of the state not being responsible for the actions of illegal migrants as claimed in the suit. In May 2021, in response to the lawsuit's failure, the Boeotia Police Union began paying the victim's living and medical costs.

== See also ==
- Crime in Greece
