= Håvard Bustnes =

Norwegian film director

- Born: September 15, 1973 (age 53); Oslo, Norway
- Occupations: Film director, cinema producer

Håvard Bustnes(1973) is a Norwegian film director and cinema producer. He is co-founder and co-owner of UpNorth Film. He holds a degree in Directing for Television from the College of Film and TV at Lillehammer, Norway.

== Career ==
Bustnes' international breakthrough came with the 2008 film Big John, which won Best Nordic Documentary at Nordisk Panorama in Malmö, The Golden Chair in Grimstad, and The Crystal Heart Award in the United States.

In 2016, Bustnes was honored with NTNUs filmpris for his contribution to the film industry in Trøndelag and development of the film community in Trondheim and the Trøndelag region. The press release praised him as one of the region's brightest filmmakers, as well as a director and producer who has demonstrated the international quality of his documentaries.

Other films include Two Raging Grannies (2013), Golden Dawn Girls (2017), Name of the Game (2021), Behind the Mask (2023), and Phantoms of the Sierra Madre (2024), The Gardener, the Buddhist & the Spy (2025), My AI Election (2026) and Let Our Mountains Live (2026).

== Filmography ==
- 2004: Business as Usual
- 2007: Riktig Mental Innstilling
- 2008: Big John
- 2010: Health Factory
- 2013: Two Raging Grannies
- 2017: Golden Dawn Girls
- 2021: Name of the Game
- 2023: Behind the Mask
- 2024: Phantoms of the Sierra Madre
- 2025: The Gardener, the Buddhist & the Spy
- 2026: My AI Election
- 2026: Let Our Mountains Live
