= Nikolaos Michaloliakos =

Greek politician (born 1957)

Nikos Michaloliakos
- Νίκος Μιχαλολιάκος
- Nikolaos Michaloliakos in 2020

General Secretary of the Golden Dawn
- In office February 1983 – April 2023
- Succeeded by: Executive Committee

Member of the Hellenic Parliament
- In office 28 June 2012 – 7 July 2019

Member of the Athens Council
- In office 1 January 2011 – 17 May 2012
- Succeeded by: Ioannis Vouldis

Personal details
- Born: Nikolaos G. Michaloliakos; 11 December 1957 (age 68) Athens, Kingdom of Greece
- Party: Golden Dawn
- Other political affiliations: 4th of August Party (1973–1984); National Political Union (1984–1985)
- Spouse: Eleni Zaroulia
- Children: Ourania Michaloliakou
- Education: National and Kapodistrian University of Athens
- Occupation: Politician

Military service
- Allegiance: Greece
- Branch/service: Hellenic Army

Nikolaos "Nikos" G. Michaloliakos (Greek: Νικόλαος (Νίκος) Γ. Μιχαλολιάκος, pronounced [niˈkolaos mixaloˈʎakos]; born 11 December 1957) is a Greek politician and neo-Nazi. He is the founder and ex-leader of the far-right ultranationalist organisation and political party Golden Dawn. Despite the party not being able to run for parliament, the Greek constitution prohibits the ban of a political party. Nikolaos Michaloliakos said in an interview he stepped down from his position in 2023 with an Executive Committee taking power of Golden Dawn. He still writes many articles for the official website of Golden Dawn and continues giving interviews for newspapers and radio stations. In October 2020, he and 41 other Golden Dawn leaders and members were found guilty of leading or participating in a criminal organisation by the Athens Appeals Court.

== Early life and education ==
Michaloliakos was born in Athens in 1957. According to his party, he completed his studies at the Faculty of Mathematics of the National and Kapodistrian University of Athens.

== Political involvement ==
At the age of 16, he joined the nationalist 4th of August Party of Konstantinos Plevris. He also participated in the Athens local organisation of EOKA-B. He was arrested for the first time in July 1974, during a protest outside the British embassy in Athens, against the stance of the United Kingdom toward the Turkish invasion of Cyprus. He was arrested again for assaulting journalists covering the December 1976 funeral of Evangelos Mallios, a policeman who tortured people during the Regime of the Colonels, assassinated by the terrorist group 17N, but was released. While he was in prison, Michaloliakos met the leaders of the Greek military junta of 1967–1974. After that he joined the Hellenic Army and became a commander of the Fast Attack Craft Command. He was arrested again in July 1978 and sentenced to one year imprisonment in January 1979 for illegally carrying guns and explosives. He was also dismissed from his position in the army.

After he was released, he launched the Golden Dawn magazine. The politics of the magazine were, initially, closely aligned with Nazi beliefs. The publication of the magazine ceased in April 1984, when Michaloliakos joined the National Political Union, and took over the leadership of its youth section, after a personal order of Georgios Papadopoulos. In January 1985, he broke away from the National Political Union and founded the "Popular National Movement - Golden Dawn".

Michaloliakos remained the leader of Golden Dawn until he announced its disbandment in November 2005. He took this step due to clashes with anti-fascists. In 2005–2007, he (like most members of Golden Dawn) continued his political activity through the Patriotic Alliance. The party was reformed under his leadership in 2007.

Golden Dawn as a political party drew public attention in the 1990s and early 2000s. In May 2012, under Michaloliakos' leadership, it garnered 21 seats in Parliament during an election conducted amid Greece's severe financial crisis, and was embroiled in various controversies, attracting international attention. A particularly controversial point was Michaloliakos's denial of the existence of the gas chambers, which the Nazis used to pepetrate the Holocaust and other crimes.

== Arrest ==
Following the fatal stabbing of the antifascist rapper Pavlos Fyssas on 17 September 2013 by a supporter of his party, Michaloliakos was arrested in a 28 September 2013 sweep, along with numerous other Golden Dawn leaders on the charges of allegedly being involved in a criminal organisation. The charge sheet included murder, extortion, and involvement in the disappearance of up to 100 immigrants. After 18 months of pretrial detention, the maximum allowed, Michaloliakos was released from jail and placed under house arrest. On 29 July 2015, his house arrest was lifted, but he was prohibited from leaving the Attica region.

In April 2015, the trial of Michaloliakos and 68 other defendants began at the high-security Korydallos prison in Athens, but was adjourned a number of times for technical reasons and to find a more suitable setting. Michaloliakos was one of 68 Golden Dawn leaders who were found guilty in October 2020. He was sentenced to 13.5 years in prison but was granted early release in May 2024 following a legal request and on account of his elderly age, albeit with several conditions such as a ban on traveling outside the greater Athens area. However, his release was subsequently overturned by another panel of judges following an appeal that found that he had shown no repentance for his crimes and was capable of reoffending. This led to him being rearrested in his residence in Athens on 3 June.

On 12 September 2025, a judicial council allowed Michaloliakos to serve his sentence at his residence on grounds of ill-health.

== Personal life ==
He is the husband of fellow Golden Dawn member Eleni Zaroulia. His daughter Ourania was one of six people arrested during a motorcycle attack against immigrants; all six were later released.

In a televised interview, Michaloliakos publicly insulted Milwaukee Bucks forward and 2019 and 2020 NBA Most Valuable Player Giannis Antetokounmpo after he was selected as the 15th overall pick in the 2013 NBA draft, calling him a "chimpanzee". He even publicly stated that Antetokounmpo and his family should have been detained and deported immediately after their meeting with then-Prime Minister Antonis Samaras.

== Publications ==
- Enemies of the Regime (Εχθροί του Καθεστώτος), 2000
- Against All (Εναντίον Όλων), 2001
- The Last Loyals (Οι Τελευταίοι Πιστοί), 2002
- For a Greater Greece in a Free Europe (Για μια Μεγάλη Ελλάδα σε μια Ελεύθερη Ευρώπη), 2000
- Pericles Giannopoulos: The Apollonian Speech (Περικλής Γιαννόπουλος: Ο Απολλώνιος Λόγος), 2006
- The Confession of a National (Η Εξομολόγηση ενός Εθνικού), reprinted in 2008
- From the Ashes of Berlin to Globalisation (Από τις Στάχτες του Βερολίνου στην Παγκοσμιοποίηση), 2008
- Defending National Memory (Υπερασπίζοντας την Εθνική Μνήμη), 2009
