= Crime in Greece =

Crime in Greece is combated by the Hellenic Police and other agencies.

During the 1980s, Greek Police Chief Nikon Arkoudeas (Νίκων Αρκουδέας) led an intense campaign against organized crime, which saw significant success.

The Greek Police dismantled several mafia organizations and arrested members of the 17 November terrorist group They organized security for the 2004 Olympic Games in 2016. In 2016, they broke the criminal organization, which had carried out more than 2,000 robberies.

== Crime by type ==
=== Murder ===
In 2011, Greece had a murder rate of 1.7 per 100,000 population. There were a total of 184 murders in Greece in 2011.

Number of homicides per year in Greece from 1998 to 2017
Sources: Hellenic Police. Annual crime data reports.
Number of homicides per year in Greece from 2018 to 2023
Sources: Hellenic Police. Annual crime data reports.

=== Organized crime ===
Organized crime in Greece is on the rise. Domestic as well as foreign criminal groups are well-entrenched in Greek society. Traditionally, people associated with organized crime were known as Men of the night (άνθρωποι της νύχτας). Out of the foreign criminal groups the Albanian mafia is the most prevalent. The activities of the Albanian crime groups in Greece include drug trafficking, human trafficking, extortion and robbery among others.

Albanian criminal groups often export other immigrants to Greece, especially Middle Eastern and Pakistani shopkeepers, and control many nightclubs in the working-class districts of West Athens. Russian groups are less numerous, but they are very heavily armed and dangerous; they are involved in arms trafficking, extortion and cigarette smuggling. Lower-level Romanian and Moldavian groups are involved in theft and human trafficking.

Domestic, ethnic Greek criminal organizations are the most powerful and politically well-connected and extensively cooperate with Albanian groups, often hiring Albanians to act as enforcers. Greek criminal organizations are involved in human trafficking, extortion, drug trafficking, kidnapping and the infiltration of legal businesses. They have profited from the rising corruption. That is evident in the fact that Greek crime groups have infiltrated the shipping industry, which is used to traffic cocaine and heroin into the Greek mainland and abroad.

=== Property crime ===
As of 2011, Greece has seen an increase in property-related crime, thought to be linked to the worsening of economic conditions. Robberies, ranging from street muggings to bank hold-ups and house burglaries, totaled about 80,000 in 2009, up from about 50,000 in 2005. The increase in property crime has seen an increase in the amount of work for private security companies. Nevertheless, the crime rate is still among the lowest in Western Europe.

In 2016, the Greek police successfully broke up the country's largest criminal organization in Greece's history, which was responsible for more than 2,000 house burglaries across the country, in an operation where at least 1,000 policemen and 37 judges participated.

=== Immigrant crime ===
The Greek police have admitted that armed gangs entering the country from neighbouring Albania or Bulgaria could have been attracted by reports that many people have been withdrawing cash from banks and stashing it in their homes. There are possibly more than 1 million illegal immigrants inside Greece as of 2012. Cases of immigrant crime such as the 2012 Paros rape have attracted nationwide interest.

Illegal immigration to Greece has increased rapidly over the past several years. Tough immigration policies in Spain and Italy and agreements with their neighboring African countries to combat illegal immigration have changed the direction of African immigration flows toward Greece. At the same time, flows from the Arab world and South Asia — mainly Afghanistan, Algeria, Iraq, and Pakistan — to Greece appear to have increased as well.

The evidence now indicates that nearly all illegal immigration to the European Union flows through the country's porous borders. In 2010, 90 percent of all apprehensions for unauthorized entry into the European Union took place in Greece, compared to 75 percent in 2009 and 50 percent in 2008.

In 2010, 132,524 persons were arrested for "illegal entry or stay" in Greece, a sharp increase from 95,239 in 2006. Nearly half of those arrested (52,469) were immediately deported, the majority of them being Albanians.

=== Tax evasion and corruption ===
Greece suffers from relatively high levels of tax evasion and political corruption, even though in recents years there has been considerable decrease. This is to the extent that tax evasion has been described by Greek politicians as "a national sport" - with up to €30 billion per year going uncollected.

==== Extent of Greek tax evasion ====
The OECD estimated in August 2009 that the size of the Greek black market to be around €65bn (equal to 25% of GDP), resulting each year in €20bn of unpaid taxes. This is a European record in relative terms, and in comparison almost twice as big as the German black market (estimated to be 15% of GDP).

Several successive Greek governments had in the past attempted to improve the situation, but all failed due to tax evasion's place within Greek culture. A rapid increase in government revenues through implementing a more effective tax collecting system has been recommended. Implementing the proper reforms, is however estimated to be a slow process, requiring at least two legislative periods before they start to work.

In the last quarter of 2005, participation in tax evasion reached an estimated 49% of the population, while in January 2006 it fell to 41.6%. A study by researchers from the University of Chicago concluded that tax evasion in 2009 by self-employed professionals alone in Greece (accountants, dentists, lawyers, doctors, personal tutors and independent financial advisers) was €28 billion or 31% of the budget deficit that year.

The Tax Justice Network has said that there are over €20 billion in Swiss bank accounts held by Greeks. The former Finance Minister of Greece, Evangelos Venizelos, was quoted as saying "Around 15,000 individuals and companies owe the taxman 37 billion euros". Additionally, the TJN puts the number of Greek-owned off-shore companies to over 10,000.

== By location ==
=== Athens ===
Armed robberies in Athens doubled between 2007 and 2009. Thefts and break-ins jumped from 26,872 recorded cases in 2007, to 47,607 in 2009. The number of murders in Athens nearly doubled between 2007 and 2009.

== Police politics ==
One of the major criticisms addressed to the Greek Police by the Greek media is the politicization of its officer corps. Up until 1981 (when Andreas Papandreou and his Panhellenic Socialist Movement party came to power), almost all senior officers of the Greek Gendarmerie and the Cities Police were inveterate right-wingers. These two agencies were merged in 1984 to create the Greek Police.
