= Immigration Policy 2.0 =

Immigration Policy 2.0 is a European Union project that aims to facilitate the participation and involvement of immigrant citizens in immigration policies framed in the Competitiveness and Innovation Framework Program (CIP)

The EU government organizations are developing new ways to be more effective in the control of 27 member countries migration flows. For this purpose, the objective of the project, which began in September 2010 and was completed in August 2013, was to centralize the concerns and demands of citizens through a digital platform to connect with the community through policies based on the development of collaborative processes.

Web 2.0, supported by modeling policies, manages to centralize services and process various demands through harmonized actions (user-friendly). These services aim to provide citizens with information to make decisions.

== Strands of action ==
- Strengthen government, politicians, and decision-making in order to work and collaborate based on immigration policies of the EU.
- To facilitate the creation of social groups of legal immigrants in order to be informed and in turn, evaluate such policies based on the audit of public opinion.
- Policy Adaptability: The project's emphasis on collaborative and adaptable policy development has allowed the European Union to respond more effectively to evolving migration challenges, such as refugee crises and changing labor market dynamics.

== Manufacturers and Support Consortium ==
Immigration Policy 2.0 takes advantage of the benefits offered by technologies such as BPM (Business Process Modelling) or ICT (Information and Communications Technology) with partners like BOC Group (BPM), ATOS (social media technology) or Singular Logic (Middleware, Open Survey System and Databases).

== Objectives ==
This European platform provides a common meeting point with services integrated by modulated processes. The information collected is stored in the cloud (hosts information) in order to be used for immigration law matters. Among its features are:

- Decision making for the EU directives and municipal offices
- Support Tools for immigration policies in the EU
- Creating processes and procedures suitable for migration between countries
- Creating and collecting civil documents

One of the keys to combating undocumented immigration is to find new ways of monitoring for the analysis of migration through the so-called Semantic Web. A barrier in the EU is the difference between legal policies adopted by each one of the countries on its borders.

The new era Web 2.0 based on collaboration and content of the citizens themselves, or the phenomenon of the decade, the explosion of social networks are analyzed by the EU in order to eradicate the gray economy, which experts currently estimate to be between 10% and 20% of gross domestic product (GDP) of the European Union. {reference?}

== FP7 ==
The Seventh Framework Program (FP7 – Framework Program 7) is a series of multi-annual Framework Programs which have been the main instrument of the European Union for funding research and development since 1984, according to the preset Treaty by the European Community.

It is considered the main EU instrument for funding scientific research and technological development for the period 2007–2013, it is one of the most important elements in realizing the Lisbon agenda for growth and competitiveness.

== Technological Services Offered ==
- Research and Search Services
- Knowledge Extraction Services
- Management and Modeling Services (GMMS, Governmental Management and

Modelling Service)

- Synchronization and standardization of immigration policies services
- Database Services (ODSS, Open Debate Support Services)

== Publications and External Links ==
- The technology platform of the Immigration Policy 2.0 in Spain was released in Evia
- Immigration Policy 2.0 Workshop can be found at ePractice Portal
- Immigration Policy 2.0 on Community Funding Guide

== See also ==
- Semantic Web
- Web 2.0
- Immigration policy
- Business Process Management
