= Judiciary of Greece =

Judicial system of Greece

The judicial system of Greece is the country's constitutionally established system of courts.

== Independence of the justice system ==
In Greece, the Constitution has firmly established the independence of the justice system.

== Selection and appointment of professional judges ==
The Greek National School of Judges (ESDI) is an educational institution based in Thessaloniki, supervised by the Minister of Justice. It was established on the basis of Law 2236/1994, with the task of selecting, educating and training those intended to be appointed to positions of judicial officers of the Council of State, the Court of Auditors, administrative, civil and penal courts and public prosecutors, as well as the continuous training of judges already in service. Its operation began in 1995 and its attendance lasts one year. In order to be admitted into the School, law school graduates must first complete their internship, gain their license to practice and then pass examinations for their admission.

Promotions and placements are regulated by judicial boards, while the Council of Ministers appoints the Presiding Judges of the three Supreme Courts.

== The three categories of the Greek judicial system ==
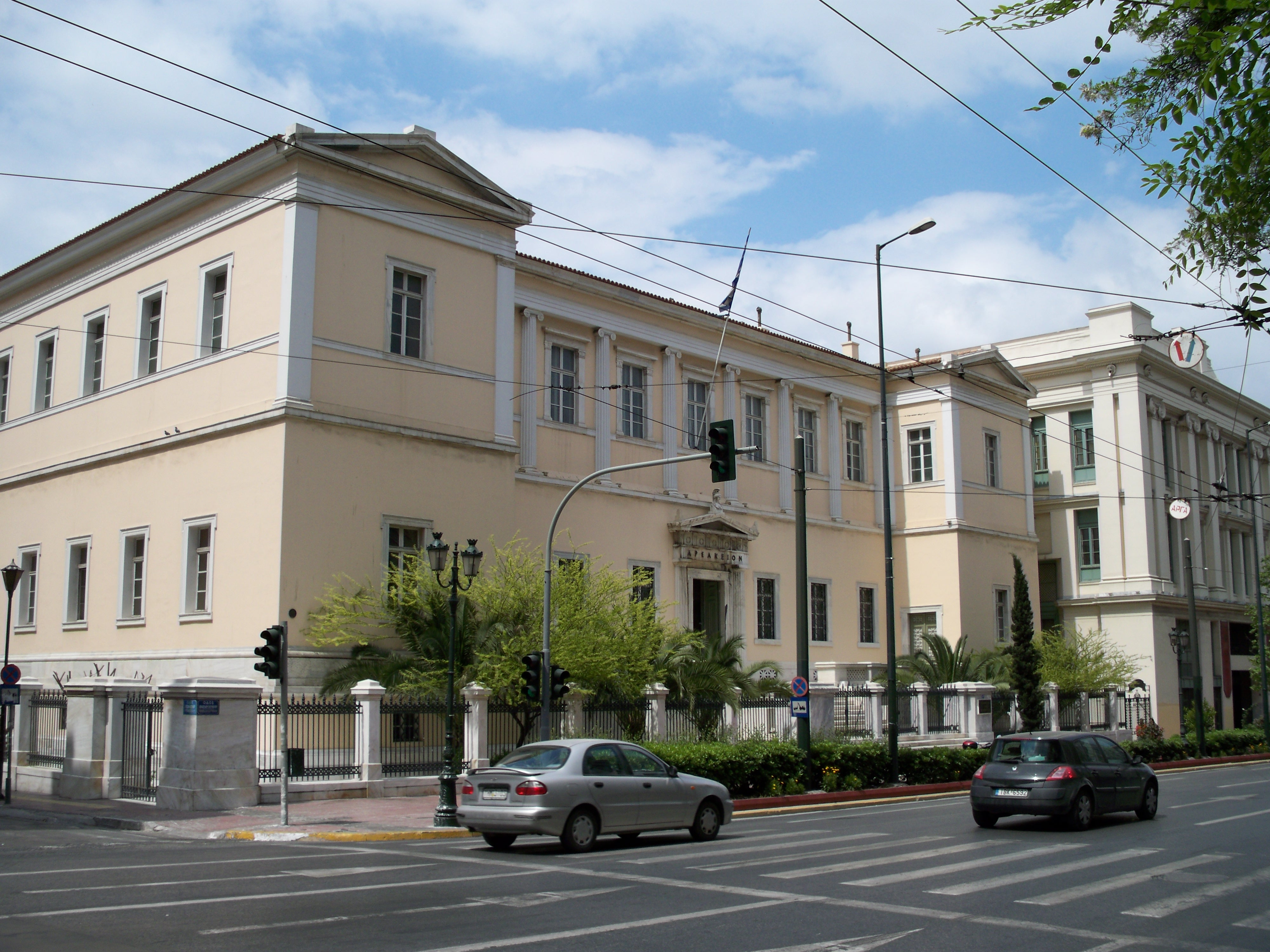
The building of the Arsakeion in Athens, where the Council of State is seated.

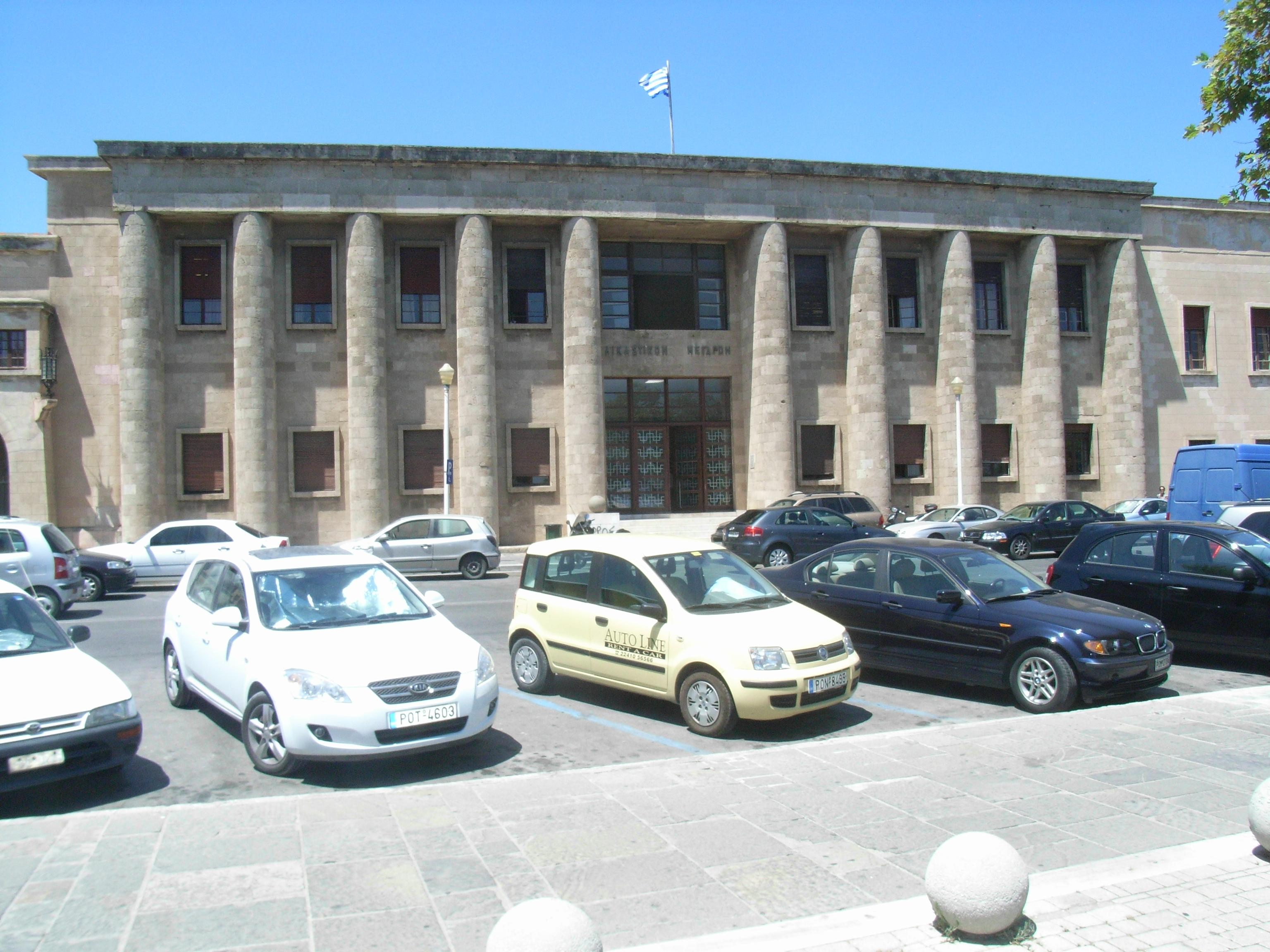
Rhodes city courthouse

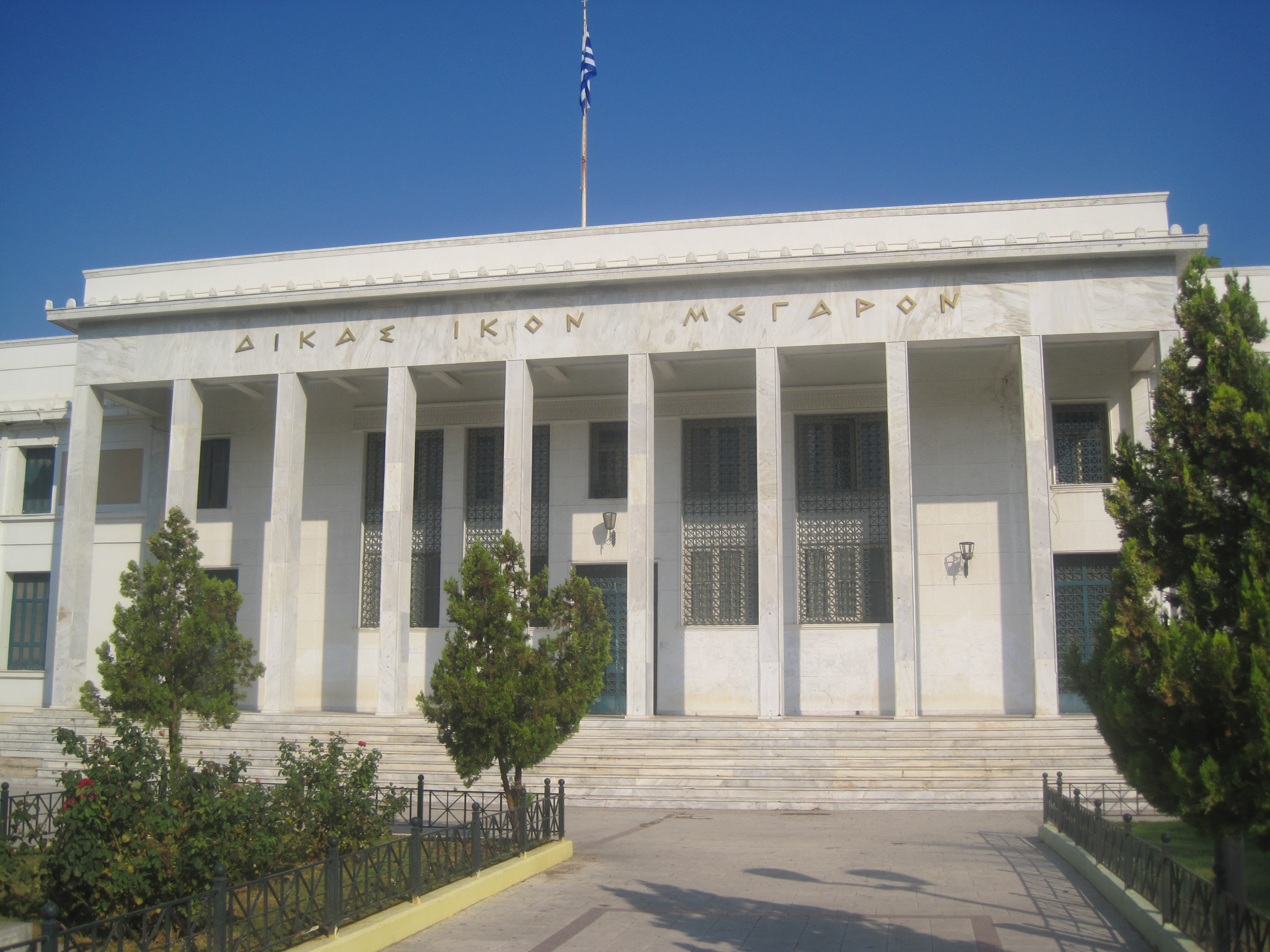
Courthouse in Corinth

According to the Constitution, there are three categories of courts: civil courts, penal courts and administrative courts. The supreme court of the civil and penal justice is the Court of Cassation, while the supreme court of the administrative justice is the Council of State. Hence, Greek judges belong to one of these two branches. Consequently, an administrative judge is not entitled to judge a penal or civil case, while a civil judge is entitled to judge a civil or penal case but not an administrative one.

=== The civil justice ===
Civil cases are judged:

- At first instance, by the District Courts or the Courts of First Instance, according to the estimated value of the matter disputed at law.
- At second instance, by the Courts of First Instance or the Courts of Appeal, according to the estimated value of the matter disputed at law.
- By the Court of Cassation, when a writ of certiorari is filed against a final decision of the Court of Appeal. The Court of Cassation's decisions are irrevocable. If the Court of Cassation concludes that a lower court violated the law or the principles of the procedure, then it can order the rehearing of the case by the lower court.

=== The penal justice ===
Crimes are judged as follows:

- Felonies are judged, at first instance, by the "mixed" Court of First Instance and, at second instance, by the "mixed" Court of Appeal. The term "mixed" refers to the participation of professional judges and jurors (retaining almost no difference from lay judges in this respect). In these "mixed" courts four jurors participate along with three professional judges, of first instance and of appeal, respectively. A constitutional provision allows the exemption of certain crimes from the jurisdiction of the "mixed" courts. These crimes are judged, at first instance by the three-member Court of Appeal and, at second instance, by the five-member Court of Appeals, without the participation of any jurors. For example, the members of the Revolutionary Organization 17 November terrorist group were judged according to this procedure, because felonies of terrorism or organised crime belong to the competence of the Court of Appeal and not to the "mixed" courts.

The Court of Cassation examines writs of certiorari against the final decisions of the ("mixed" or not) Courts of Appeals and it can order the rehearing of a case by the lower court, if it concludes that the lower court violated the law or the principles of the procedure.

- Misdemeanours are judged, at first instance, by the Misdemeanours Court and, at second instance, by the Court of Appeal. A writ of certiorari against the final decision of the Court of Appeal is possible.
- Infringements are judged by the Magistrate's Court.

=== Administrative justice ===
The judicial control of an administrative act goes either on its merits or not. The administrative acts of the first case are appealed against with the legal remedies of the recourse or of the suit and they belong to the jurisdiction of the Administrative Courts (of First Instance and of Appeal), while all the other administrative acts are appealed against with the legal remedy of the writ of annulment and they belong to the jurisdiction either of the Council of State or of the Administrative Court of Appeal.

The control of these acts has to do with matters of legality, namely whether they are issued in accordance with the Constitution and the laws. At second and final instance, the Council of State is always competent to judge these acts. The decisions of all the administrative courts may be appealed against with a writ of certiorari, which is judged by the Council of State.

The Court of Audit is also a supreme administrative court, whose jurisdiction is limited in certain particular areas (e.g., disputes between the state and the civil servants concerning their pensions). Its decisions are irrevocable and out of the control of the Council of State.

== The constitutional control of laws ==
According to the Greek judicial system every court is competent to judge the conformity, or lack thereof, of a legal provision with the Constitution. This judicial right constitutes the so-called "diffused" control of constitutionality, which is opposed to the "concentrated" control. The latter exists in most European countries, which have a Supreme Constitutional Court, such as Italy, Germany or even France, which has a Constitutional Council. Since there is no such court in Greece, all courts are deemed competent to decide upon the constitutionality of a legal provision.

=== The Supreme Special Court ===
The Supreme Special Court is not a "regular" and "permanent" court, namely it sits only when a case belonging to its jurisdiction arises. It dates back to 1927 when it was established after the Czechoslovak model. Its role is:

1. to resolve disputes between the Supreme Courts or between the courts and the administration
2. to take an irrevocable decision, when contradictory decisions of the Supreme Courts, concerning the true meaning or the constitutionality of a legal provision, are issued
3. to judge the pleas against the validity of the result of the legislative elections

Consequently, it is the only court that can declare an unconstitutional legal provision "powerless" (not "null and void") and expel it from the Greek legal system, while the Supreme Courts can only declare it as "inapplicable" for the particular case. The decisions of the Supreme Special Court are binding for all courts, including the Supreme Courts.

=== Proposed Supreme Constitutional Court ===
At the outset of 2006, the prime minister of Greece, Kostas Karamanlis, included within the plans of the scheduled constitutional amendment the foundation of a Supreme Constitutional Court, which would take the jurisdiction of the Supreme Special Court. A supporter of the proposition had been the Minister for the Environment, Physical Planning and Public Works Georgios Souflias. However, shortly after the prime minister's announcement, an ardent debate broke out about the necessity of a Constitutional Court.

The government thus became ambivalent and, since any proposition never got a final form, it is not clear yet whether it entailed the concentration of the constitutional control to the Supreme Constitutional Court, replacing the present "diffused control" model of distributed legal liability of the courts, or would take a jurisdiction similar of the existing Supreme Special Court, consisting in the resolution of contradictions and disputes between the three Supreme Courts.

=== EU Law and the Constitution ===
The Court of Justice of the European Union considers the law of the EU superior to the national laws, including the national constitutions. This, however, applies where the European Council has expressly legislated in particular areas, this being where treaty provisions provide for secondary legislation in furtherance of the former. The Greek courts and, especially, the Council of State have avoided expressing themselves about the superiority of the Constitution or EU law.

In 2001, a new provision was added to the Constitution, according to which the owners of private mass media are not allowed to participate in public procurements. Both major parties, New Democracy (ND) and Panhellenic Socialist Movement (PASOK), agreed to this provision, aiming, according to those who proposed it, at promoting transparency. In 2005, Parliament passed a law, materialising the constitutional provision.

The European Commission reacted immediately and warned that this legal provision violates the EU law of competition. The Greek government answered that the law materialises the respective constitutional provision, which is superior to the EU law. An ardent supporter of this opinion was the professor of law and Minister for the Interior, Public Administration and Decentralisation Prokopis Pavlopoulos. Nevertheless, the government receded and amended the law according to the European Commission's instructions, when the European Commission threatened to cut Community funds destined for Greece.

=== The Constitutional control and the Council of State ===
After the constitutional amendment of 2001, Supreme Courts decide on the constitutionality of a legal provision only in Plenary Session. By this amendment the Council of State Chambers were deprived of their competence to separately judge the constitutionality of a legal provision. Now the Chambers are obliged to submit the case to the Plenary Session of the Council of State.

Nonetheless one of the Chambers of the Council of State issued the Decision 372/2005 on a case including a problem of constitutionality, where instead of the case being submitted to the Plenary Session, it was withhold and then applied to the European Convention on Human Rights, thus annulling the administrative act. With this device the Chamber of the Council reinforced its competence without violating the Constitution and avoided a time-consuming procedure for the litigant.

According to the Constitution, the legal force of the international conventions is superior to the national laws but inferior to the Constitution.

== Controversies ==
Various corruption cases often appeared, such as the Paradikastiko organization scandal consisting of lawyers, judges and Church of Greece representatives in the late 2000s (see also Vatopedi case).

== See also ==
- Politics of Greece
