= Supreme Court of Greece (disambiguation) =

The Supreme Court of Greece can refer to any of the three Supreme Courts of Greece:

- Court of Cassation (Greek: Άρειος Πάγος; established 1834), the supreme court of Greece for civil and criminal law
- Council of State (Greek: Συμβούλιο της Επικρατείας, 1835-1844; refounded 1928), the Supreme Administrative Court of Greece
- Chamber of Accounts (Greek: Ελεγκτικό Συνέδριο, established 1833), a Supreme Administrative Court with a special jurisdiction
