= Special Highest Court =

One of the four Supreme Courts of Greece

In Greece, the Special Highest Court, (Greek: Ανώτατο Ειδικό Δικαστήριο) is provided for in the article 100 of the Constitution of Greece. It is not a permanent court and it sits only when a case belonging to its special competence arises. It is regarded as the supreme "constitutional" and "electoral" court of Greece. Its decisions are irrevocable and binding for all the courts, including the Supreme Courts. However, the Special Highest Court does not have an hierarchical relation with the three Supreme Courts (the Supreme Civil and Criminal Court of Greece, the Council of State and the Court of Audit). It is not considered higher than these courts and it does not belong to any branch (civil, penal, administrative) of the Greek justice system.

== Composition ==
According to the article 100 of the Constitution the Special Highest Court comprises eleven members. Namely:

- the presidents of the three Supreme Courts,
- four members of the Court of Cassation, chosen by lot for a two-years term,
- four members of the Council of State, chosen by lot for a two-years term.

The Court is presided over by the seniormost president of either the Court of Cassation or the Council of State.

When the Special Highest Court: a) resolves the conflicts between the administration and the courts or between the administrative and the civil courts or between the Chamber of Accounts and the other courts, or b) resolves a dispute about the constitutionality of a legal provision or about the real meaning of a legal provision, then the Court comprises two extra members: two (full) professors of Law, appointed by lot.

== History ==
The history of the Special Highest Court is quite short, as it was first founded by the Constitution of 1975. Its organisation and function is regulated by the article 100 of the Constitution of 1975/1986/2001 and the Law 345/1976. Germs of this Court exist in the article 73 of the Constitution of 1952 (providing for a special electoral court) and in the constitutions of the military junta (1967-1974), providing for a dedicated constitutional court, as well as a special court resolving the disputes between the Supreme Courts.

== Jurisdiction ==
The jurisdiction of the Special Highest Court is strictly defined by the Constitution (article 100). Hence:

- It judges pleas against the validity of the results of the legislative elections
- It controls the validity of the results of the referendums.
- It decides the deposition of a member of the Parliament, according to the constitutional provisions.
- It resolves the conflicts between the administration and the courts or between the administrative and the civil courts or between the Chamber of Accounts and the other courts
- It resolves a dispute about the constitutionality of a legal provision or about the real meaning of a legal provision
- It decides whether a rule of international law belongs to the customary international law.

=== The Court as the "Supreme Electoral Court" ===
Since the Special Highest Court has the power to issue an irrevocable and binding decision, with which a member of the Parliament loses their position, it becomes the "supreme electoral court". According to the article 58 of the Constitution, the court examines pleas concerning electoral violations or lack of legal qualifications of candidates. It also controls whether a member of the Parliament has undertaken duties incompatible with their office. These incompatible duties are enumerated in article 57 of the Constitution. If the Special Highest Court ascertains the incompatibility of the undertaken duties, the deputy loses their office "by operation of law".

=== The Court as the "Supreme Constitutional Court" ===
In Greece every court controls the constitutionality of the laws and there is no permanent, specialised constitutional court, as in countries such as Spain or Germany. If any court judges a legal provision unconstitutional, it decides not to apply it, but it doesn't have the power to declare the provision null and void. This restriction is also binding for the Supreme Courts, which declare unconstitutional legal provisions "inapplicable". Nonetheless, if a case concerning the constitutionality of a law is introduced into the Special Highest Court (after the issuing of contradictory decisions of the Supreme Courts), the Court has the constitutional right to declare an unconstitutional legal provision as "powerless". This means that the unconstitutional legal provision still exists (it is not formally "null and void"), but it is expelled from the Greek "law and order".

The decision of the Special Highest Court, declaring the unconstitutionality of a legal provision is final, irrevocable, binding for every Greek court, including the Supreme Courts, and judges the matter once for ever. No court has the right to take a different decision for the same legal provision in the future. If a court of first instance or a court of appeals or even a Supreme Court had judged the same matter in a contradictory way before the issuing of the decision of the Special Highest Court, it is obliged to reverse is judgement and to reissue it in accordance with the Special Highest Court's decision.

== "Special Court" for Impeachments ==
The Special Highest Court of article 100 must not be confused with the "Special Court" of article 86 of the Constitution. This last "Special Court" is an ad hoc court, competent to judge alleged criminal acts of members of government (previous or in service), committed in their official capacity only (i.e. not common criminal or civil offenses committed in their personal capacity) and only when impeached by Parliament. It is also competent to judge the President of the Republic, if impeached by Parliament for intentional violation of the Constitution or for high treason. In such cases, Parliament acts as the prosecuting attorney and the defendant(s) may be represented by lawyers of their choice, as in any court. Up until the 2001 constitutional amendment, the Parliament appointed 3 MPs (plus three surrogates) to serve as prosecutors in the trial; they have now been replaced by a member of the Prosecution of Supreme Civil and Criminal Court of Greece (i.e. a professional prosecutor), ensuring Parliamentary disengagement and avoiding any potential political exploitation of the trial.

This "Special Court" comprises seven judges of the Court of Cassation and six judges of the Council of State, chosen by lot. It is presided over by the seniormost judge for the Court of Cassation.

== See also ==
- Constitution
- Constitutionalism
- Constitutional economics
- Jurisprudence
- Judiciary
- Rule of law
- Rule According to Higher Law
