= Parliamentary Committees (Greece) =

Greek committee

The Parliament of Greece naturally assumes legislative responsibilities within the framework of the state, a key part of this parliamentary process (in any liberal democracy) is the establishment and running of Parliamentary committees on all manner of state decisions. There are several different types of Parliamentary committee within the Greek system.

== Standing committees ==
Standing committees are the main committees associated with the Greek Parliament. They are instituted and composed at the onset of every Regular Session with the directive of the Speaker of the Parliament, in order to process and examine bill or law proposals. Following the revision of the Constitution and the amendment of the Standing Orders, they are free to exercise both legislative work and parliamentary control. There are 6 standing committees:

- Standing Committee on Cultural and Educational Affairs.
- Standing Committee on Defense and Foreign Affairs.
- Standing Committee on Economic Affairs.
- Standing Committee on Social Affairs.
- Standing Committee on Public Administration, Public Order and Justice.
- Standing Committee on Production and Trade.

== Special committees ==
These are instituted by the Speaker of the Parliament following a Government proposal for a new bill or law to be passed. They scrutinize and analyse the bill and when they have made a final decision in regard to it their term expires.

== Special permanent committees ==
These are special committees which are instituted at the onset of each new Parliamentary session. Unlike special committees set up to scrutinize a specific law, they do not have a fixed term of existence and are permanent. There are 4 special permanent committees.

- Special Permanent Committee on Greeks Abroad
- Special Permanent Committee on Institutions and Transparency
- Special Permanent Committee on Technology Assessment
- Special Permanent Committee on Equality and Human Rights

== Internal Parliamentary committees ==
They are instituted at the onset of every Regular Session and deal with standing internal issues of the workings of the Parliament and scrutinize the running of parliament. There are 4 Internal Parliamentary committees.

- Standing Orders of the Parliament.
- Committee on Parliaments Finances.
- Committee on the Parliaments Library.
- Committees on Parliaments International Affairs.

== Investigative committees ==
Investigation committees are instituted for the assessment of general interest special issues (i.e. investigations into things such as major corruption issues that require the attention of Parliament), following the proposal of one fifth of the total number of Parliamentarians (60 Parliamentarians) and the vote of the Plenary Session.
