= Konstantinos Raktivan =

Greek jurist and politician

Konstantinos Raktivan (Greek: Κωνσταντίνος Ρακτιβάν; 1865 – 21 May 1935) was a Greek jurist and politician, who served as a cabinet minister, as the de facto first Governor-General of Macedonia, president of the Athens Bar Association and of the Council of State, Speaker of the Hellenic Parliament and member and president of the Academy of Athens.

== Early life ==
Konstantinos Raktivan was born in 1865 at Manchester, where his father Demetrios Raktivan (naturalized in Britain as Ractivand), a merchant from Veroia, was active in business. His mother, Maria Ismiridou, hailed from Constantinople.

The young Raktivan studied law at the University of Athens, and began his practice as a lawyer in 1885, the same year he published his first legal study. After a brief service as judge in Syros in 1888–89, he resigned from the Judicial Corps to focus on his career as a lawyer. He exercised this profession for 25 years (1885–1912), and was distinguished for his ability and integrity. Raktivan also became a driving force behind the foundation of the Athens Bar Association in 1909, of which he was elected as the first Vice President, and subsequently President for three consecutive years in 1910–12.

== Political career ==
The Goudi coup of 1909 and the subsequent entry of Eleftherios Venizelos in Greek public life marked a decisive turning-point in Raktivan's life, as he soon became one of the Cretan politician's closest collaborators. Elected to the Hellenic Parliament representing Attica in the November 1910 elections, he played a leading role in the drafting of the new Greek Constitution of 1911. Raktivan was re-elected in the March 1912 and May 1915 elections. In 1912 he became Minister of Justice under Venizelos as Prime Minister, a development which also marked the definitive end of his career as a lawyer. He remained Justice Minister until the cabinet's resignation on 25 February 1915.

Following the outbreak of the First Balkan War in October 1912 and the successes of the Greek Army, Raktivan was sent by Venizelos to Thessaloniki to oversee the administration of the newly conquered areas of Macedonia. The political situation there was extremely delicate. Thessaloniki in particular was a multi-national and cosmopolitan city where Greeks were a minority, and whose future was uncertain, as the interests of Greece's Balkan League allies—chiefly Bulgaria, which had troops stationed in and north of the city and claimed a condominium with Greece—as well as those of the Great Powers, clashed with Greece's. Raktivan's main task was to ensure good governance, as well as to exercise Greek sovereignty over the territory in question so as to strengthen Greece's claims in any future negotiations. In this, he was forced to work mostly through the pre-existing Ottoman administration, including the Ottoman Gendarmerie, which had been left in place. He remained at this post until June 1913, when, with the Second Balkan War against Bulgaria under way, he was replaced by Stephanos Dragoumis.

In 1918, Raktivan was named Interior Minister in the Venizelos government, a post he kept until the Venizelist electoral defeat in November 1920. From this position, he oversaw the incorporation of eastern Macedonia (autumn 1918) and Western Thrace (1920) into Greece. Raktivan remained on the sidelines during the People's Party administration in 1920–22, but was elected to Parliament (the IV National Assembly) in December 1923, serving as its speaker in 1924–25. In 1926 he was appointed to the newly founded Academy of Athens by the dictatorial government of Theodoros Pangalos, but refused to recognize this act until it was repeated by a legitimate government in 1929. In 1933, he was elected president of the Academy.

In 1928, the new Venizelos cabinet appointed him as president of the newly founded Council of State, which began working the next year. Raktivan himself had ardently championed the Council's foundation as the country's supreme court in 1910–11, and had even composed its first charter, but the wars and internal turmoil of the following decade had delayed its creation until 1928. Raktivan remained as head of the Council of State until his retirement in 1935, shortly before his death. From this position he laboured to, in his own words, "establish our country as a state of justice, especially in regards to Public Administration", but his effort was ill-timed: the Second Hellenic Republic of the Interwar period was extremely unstable, and became progressively more and more undemocratic, culminating in the restoration of the monarchy and the dictatorial Fourth of August Regime of Ioannis Metaxas in 1936.

== Works ==
- Μελέτη επί του νόμου 963 ΞΕ της 22 Μαΐου 1885 περί τόκου υπερημερίας και τόκου τόκων (1885)
- Τινά περί προκαταρκτικών συμβάσεων (1888)
- Ζητήματα τινά σχετικά προς την δικαστικήν παράστασιν των ανηλίκων (1888)
- Περί της μετά την λύσιν του γάμου τύχης της προικός κατά το εν Ελλάδι κρατούν ρωμαϊκόν και βυζαντινόν δίκαιον (1892)
- Τα κτήματα των μεταναστευσάντων εκ των νέων χωρών (1916)
- Η συνταγματική προστασία της εργασίας (1933)
- Έγγραφα και σημειώσεις εκ της πρώτης ελληνικής διοικήσεως της Μακεδονίας (1912–13) (posthumous, 1951)

Legal offices
New title	President of the Council of State; 1929–1935	Succeeded by Stamos Papafrangos
Political offices
Preceded by Eleftherios Venizelos	Speaker of the Hellenic Parliament; 21 January 1924 – 3 September 1925	Vacant Dictatorship of Theodoros Pangalos
Preceded by Emmanouil Repoulis	Minister of the Interior of Greece; 3 January 1918 – 4 November 1920	Succeeded by Panagiotis Tsaldaris
New title	Governor-General of Macedonia (de facto); October 1912 – June 1913	Succeeded by Stephanos Dragoumis
Preceded by Nikolaos Dimitrakopoulos	Minister of Justice of Greece; 18 May 1912 – 25 February 1915	Succeeded by Panagiotis Tsaldaris
