= Manolis Kefalogiannis =

Greek politician (born 1959)

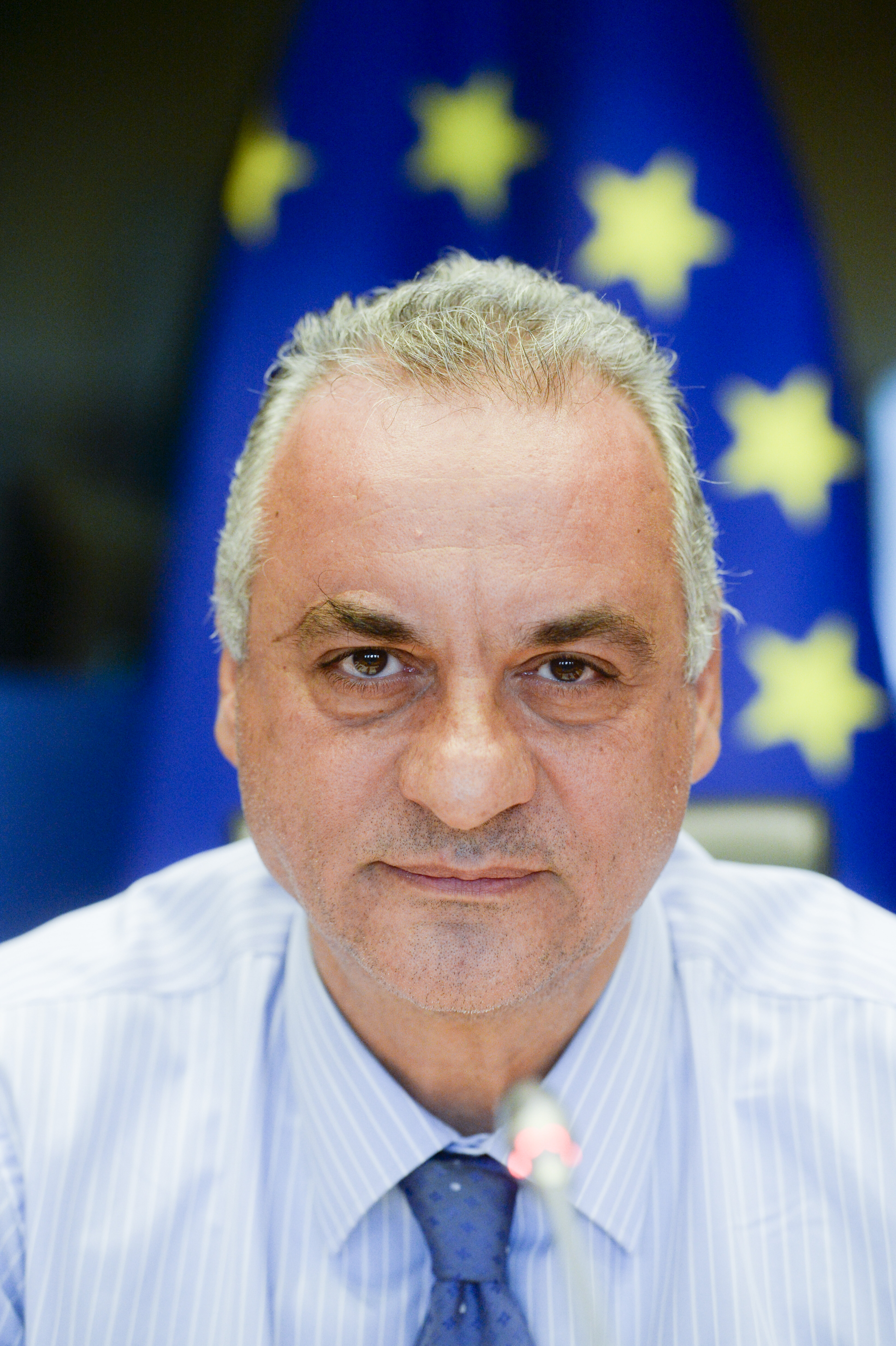

Member of the European Parliament for Greece
- In office 2014–present
- Constituency: Greece

Personal details
- Born: Manolis Kefalogiannis; 25 May 1959 (age 66) Heraklion, Crete, Greece
- Party: New Democracy; EPP

Manolis K. Kefalogiannis (Greek: Μανώλης Κεφαλογιάννης; born 25 May 1959) is a Greek politician of the New Democracy party from Heraklion, Crete, who has been serving as a Member of the European Parliament since 2014.

== Political career ==
=== Member of the Greek Parliament, 1990–2014 ===
Kefalogiannis served as a member of the Hellenic Parliament from 1990 until 2014. From 2004 to 2007, he was Minister for Mercantile Marine in the government of Prime Minister Kostas Karamanlis. In the 15th legislature from 2012 until 2014, he was a member of the Special Permanent Committee on Institutions and Transparency.

=== Member of the European Parliament, 2014–present ===
In the 2014 European elections, Kefalogiannis became a Member of the European Parliament. In parliament, he first served on the Committee on Foreign Affairs and its Subcommittee on Security and Defence from 2014 until 2019 before moving to the Committee on Regional Development. In this capacity, he served as the parliament’s rapporteur on the Just Transition Fund (JTF), a 17.5 billion euro ($21.37 billion) fund established as part of the European Green Deal in 2021 to support communities most affected by plans to shut down coal, peat and oil shale sectors, or other emissions-intensive industries.

In addition to his committee assignments, Kefalogiannis is part of the parliament's delegations to the EU-Turkey Joint Parliamentary Committee and to the EU-Albania Stabilisation and Association Parliamentary Committee. He is also a member of the European Parliament Intergroup on Artificial Intelligence and Digital, the URBAN Intergroup and the Spinelli Group.

== Personal life ==
Kefalogiannis is the nephew of fellow politician Manolis V. Kefalogiannis.
