= Article 120 of the Greek Constitution =

Last article of the Greek Constitution

5th Revisionary Hellenic Parliament
- Long title: Final Provision - Article 120
- Territorial extent: Greece
- Status: Current legislation

Article 120 of the Constitution of Greece (Greek: Άρθρο 120 του Συντάγματος της Ελλάδας), otherwise known as the Final Provision (Greek: Ακροτελεύτια Διάταξη), is the final article of the Constitution of Greece.

It stipulates the entry into force of the Constitution (paragraph 1), respect towards the Constitution and the law and devotion to the Fatherland and to Democracy (paragraph 2), the obligation to prosecute usurpation of popular sovereignty (paragraph 3) and the right to resist (paragraph 4). It belongs to Section IV of the Greek Constitution, Special, Final and Transitory Provisions.

== Text of the article ==
The full text of the article in Greek:

ΤMHMA Δ’

Aκροτελεύτια διάταξη
Άρθρο 120

1. Το Σύνταγμα αυτό, που ψηφίστηκε από την Ε’ Aναθεωρητική Bουλή των Ελλήνων, υπογράφεται από τον Πρόεδρό της, δημοσιεύεται από τον προσωρινό Πρόεδρο της Δημοκρατίας στην Εφημερίδα της Kυβερνήσεως, με διάταγμα που προσυπογράφεται από το Yπουργικό Συμβούλιο και αρχίζει να ισχύει από τις ένδεκα Iουνίου 1975.
2. O σεβασμός στο Σύνταγμα και τους νόμους που συμφωνούν με αυτό και η αφοσίωση στην Πατρίδα και τη Δημοκρατία αποτελούν θεμελιώδη υποχρέωση όλων των Ελλήνων.
3. O σφετερισμός, με οποιονδήποτε τρόπο, της λαϊκής κυριαρχίας και των εξουσιών που απορρέουν από αυτή διώκεται μόλις αποκατασταθεί η νόμιμη εξουσία, οπότε αρχίζει και η παραγραφή του εγκλήματος.
4. H τήρηση του Συντάγματος επαφίεται στον πατριωτισμό των Ελλήνων, που δικαιούνται και υποχρεούνται να αντιστέκονται με κάθε μέσο εναντίον οποιουδήποτε επιχειρεί να το καταλύσει με τη βία.

The official English translation:

SECTION IV

Final Provision
Article 120

1. This Constitution, voted by the Fifth Revisionary Parliament of the Hellenes, is signed by its Speaker and published by the provisional President of the Republic in the Government Gazette by decree countersigned by the Cabinet and shall enter into force on the eleventh of June 1975.
2. Respect towards the Constitution and the law concurrent thereto, and devotion to the Fatherland and to Democracy constitute a fundamental duty of all Greeks.
3. Usurpation, in any way whatsoever, of popular sovereignty and of powers deriving therefrom shall be prosecuted upon restoration of the lawful authority; the limitation from which punishment for the crime is barred shall begin as of the restoration of lawful authority.
4. Observance of the constitution is entrusted to the patriotism of the Greeks who shall have the right and the duty to resist by all possible means against anyone who attempts the violent abolition of the Constitution.

== Notes ==
Paragraph 1: The "provisional President of the Republic" mentioned was Michail Stasinopoulos, who was elected as President of the Republic by a majority in the Hellenic Parliament. He served as Head of State from 18 December 1974, succeeding President pro tempore Phaedon Gizikis, until 19 July 1975, that is, until the finalization of the new political institutions by the revisionary national assembly through the promulgation of the new Constitution of Greece.

Paragraphs 2 & 3: The 1975 Constitution is the first to include provisions regarding respect towards "law [...] and devotion to the Fatherland and to Democracy" defined as a "fundamental duty of all Greeks", as well as the obligation to legally prosecute usurpation of popular sovereignty and constitutional order. Although the Greek word Δημοκρατία can be translated as either "Republic" or "Democracy", the latter word is used by the official English translation, since the re-establishment of the Greek monarchy is already prohibited by Article 110 of the 1975 Constitution.

Paragraph 4 - The right to resist: This paragraph incorporates the pre-existing article 114 of the 1952 Constitution (Identical to article 107 of the 1844 Constitution and article 111 of the 1911 Constitution):

Ἡ τήρησις τοῦ παρόντος Συντάγματος ἀφιεροῦται εἰς τὸν πατριωτισμὸν τῶν Ἑλλήνων

translated as

Observance of the constitution hereof is dedicated to the patriotism of the Greeks

alongside "the right and the duty to resist by all possible means" any violent attempt to abolish the Constitution.

Paragraph 4 does not, in any way, stipulate ownership of firearms, or apply in the cases of contravention of articles of the constitution, cession of national sovereignty (e.g. accession to the European Union) or a state of siege (pursuant to Article 48 of the Constitution). As such, it is to be considered active in cases when institutional bodies (such as the Parliament) are unable to function properly and monitor the observance of the Constitution, like that of a coup d'état or foreign occupation.

=== Use as a political motto ===
1-1-4 (ένα ένα τέσσερα), referencing article 114 of the 1952 Constitution (see above), was a political motto of the 1960s, used by United Democratic Left and Centre Union youth wings against Constantine Karamanlis's National Radical Union after the 1961 Greek legislative election, widely considered to have been rigged, and later on by PAK against the Regime of the Colonels. It has fallen out of use following Metapolitefsi.
