= Greek constitutional amendment of 2008 =

In early 2006, Prime Minister Kostas Karamanlis of the New Democracy party proposed an amendment to the Greek Constitution of 1975/1986/2001 with 38 new provisions. Of these, 3 were adopted in May 2008:

- Repeal of the prohibition of any professional occupation for the members of Parliament;
- Parliament can amend allocations of the state budget, and to monitor their implementation (article 79);
- Special provisions for insular and mountainous regions (article 101).

== Propositions of the parties ==
Some of the main points of Karamanlis' and his New Democracy party propositions are:

- The modification of the constitutional provision which currently does not allow the foundation and operation of "non-state owned" universities.
- The foundation of a Supreme Constitutional Court, which would replace the Supreme Special Court.
- The clarification of the meaning of the constitutional provisions concerning the environment.
- The adaption of the constitutional provisions concerning the mass media (Article 14) to the rules of the European law.
- The limitation of the cases of immunity of the Greek deputies.

For his part, the leader of leading opposition party, Panhellenic Socialist Movement (PASOK), George Papandreou, proposed:

- The protection of the human rights of foreigners.
- The support of public universities and the operation of "non-state owned" universities under stringent terms.
- The strengthening of direct democracy through the promotion of the institution of the referendum.
- The direct election of the President of the Republic, if a parliamentary majority is not achieved.
- The introduction of a new legislative procedure initiated by the people.
- The rewriting of the preamble, which asserts Greek Orthodoxy's predominant position by the inclusion of the formula "in the name of the Holy and Consubstantial and Indivisible Trinity".

== Debated issues ==
=== Amendment and civil society ===
For their part, constitutional theory experts, such as G. Papadimitriou, pointed out that without the participation of the civil society the proposed amendment could not be viable and effective. Such a participation was going to strengthen the vigor of the political institutions through:

- the boosting of the participatory democracy
- the protection of human rights and
- the renewal of the political system.

=== Private universities ===
In 2001 New Democracy proposed an amendment of the constitution, in order to allow private universities to operate in Greece on a non-profit basis. This proposal was rejected by then-ruling PASOK, and thus could not muster the support necessary to be put to vote on the constitutional amendment of 2001. However, PASOK has since changed its stance, and now also supports a constitutional provision for the creation of private Universities on a non-profit basis. On behalf of PASOK, Andreas Loverdos underscored his agreement with the operation of private universities, but he insisted that they do not trust the government and that their priority are public universities.

This proposal continues however to encounter the fierce opposition of the Left parties, as well as a sizeable part of the academic community, both professors and students.

Former President Christos Sartzetakis agreed with the proposed modification of the constitutional provision, which does not allow the operation of "non-state owned" universities. He underscored however that the legislative framework must not allow the foundation of private theological schools.

=== Religion ===
During the 2001 constitutional amendment, complete separation of church and state was proposed, but the two major parties, New Democracy and PASOK, decided not to open this controversial matter. Some still claim, however, that Greece had and continues to have a serious problem of religious freedom. In any case, none of the two main parties has expressed any intention to amend the Article 3 of the Constitution. K. Karamanlis insisted that his party has not modified its position expressed in 2001.

Former Prime Minister Konstantinos Mitsotakis claimed that the separation of church and state is not necessary. He also argued that the problem with the criminal laws concerning proselytism could be resolved without any amendment of Article 13.

Ch. Sartzetakis asserted that Article 3 of the Constitution should be amended, so that all the ecclesiastical provinces of Greece come under the authority of the Church of Greece, in contrast to the current situation, where the lands gained after 1912 lie de jure under the authority of the Ecumenical Patriarchate of Constantinople per the Patriarchical Volume of 1850 and the Synodical Act of 1928. According to Sartzetakis, this would be the only way to achieve ecclesiastical unity.

=== Election of the President ===
Papandreou proposed the direct election of the President by the people, albeit only in the cases the necessary majority in the Hellenic Parliament could not be achieved, emphasizing that a potential political deadlock could thus be avoided. K. Karamanlis rejected this proposal and asserted that the present constitutional provisions needed no modification, although in 2001 he had also supported the direct election of the President.

Konstantinos Mitsotakis stayed firm in his traditional position for the direct election of the President by the people. Thereby, he disagreed with ND's current official stance as expressed by its leader. Supporters of Mitsotakis' and Papandreou's proposal, such as Giannis Pretenderis, argue that as the people directly elect their mayor or prefect, they should also in the same way elect the Head of State, whose constitutional role is much more important. On the other hand, Christos Sartzetakis argued that the direct election of the President was not allowed by Article 110 of the Constitution.

=== Justice ===
The heads of the supreme courts are appointed by the Cabinet of Greece for a 4-year term. Ch. Sartzetakis disagrees with these procedure and proposed that the heads of the supreme courts should be chosen by lot among the vice-presidents of each supreme court. He also expressed opposition to the 4-year term, as well as with Karamanlis' proposal for the creation of a Constitutional Court. The foundation of this court was dynamically supported by Georgios Souflias.

== Outcome ==
In the event, Karamanlis' ambitious plans would not be fulfilled, especially after PASOK's withdrawal from the procedure. The Parliament was convened to take its final decisions as regards the constitutional amendment after the elections of 2007. Finally, in May 2008, only 3 of the 38 proposals of New Democracy were passed by the necessary majority of 180 votes, and finally adopted:

1. the absolute prohibition of any professional occupation for the members of the Hellenic Parliament is lifted (articles 57 and 115).
2. the Parliament is given the right to amend allocations of the state budget, and to monitor their implementation (article 79);
3. special legislative care should be taken for the insular and mountainous regions of Greece (article 101).
