= Council of State (Greece) =

Supreme administrative court in Greece

Coordinates: 37°58′53″N 23°43′52″E

- Συμβούλιο της Επικρατείας
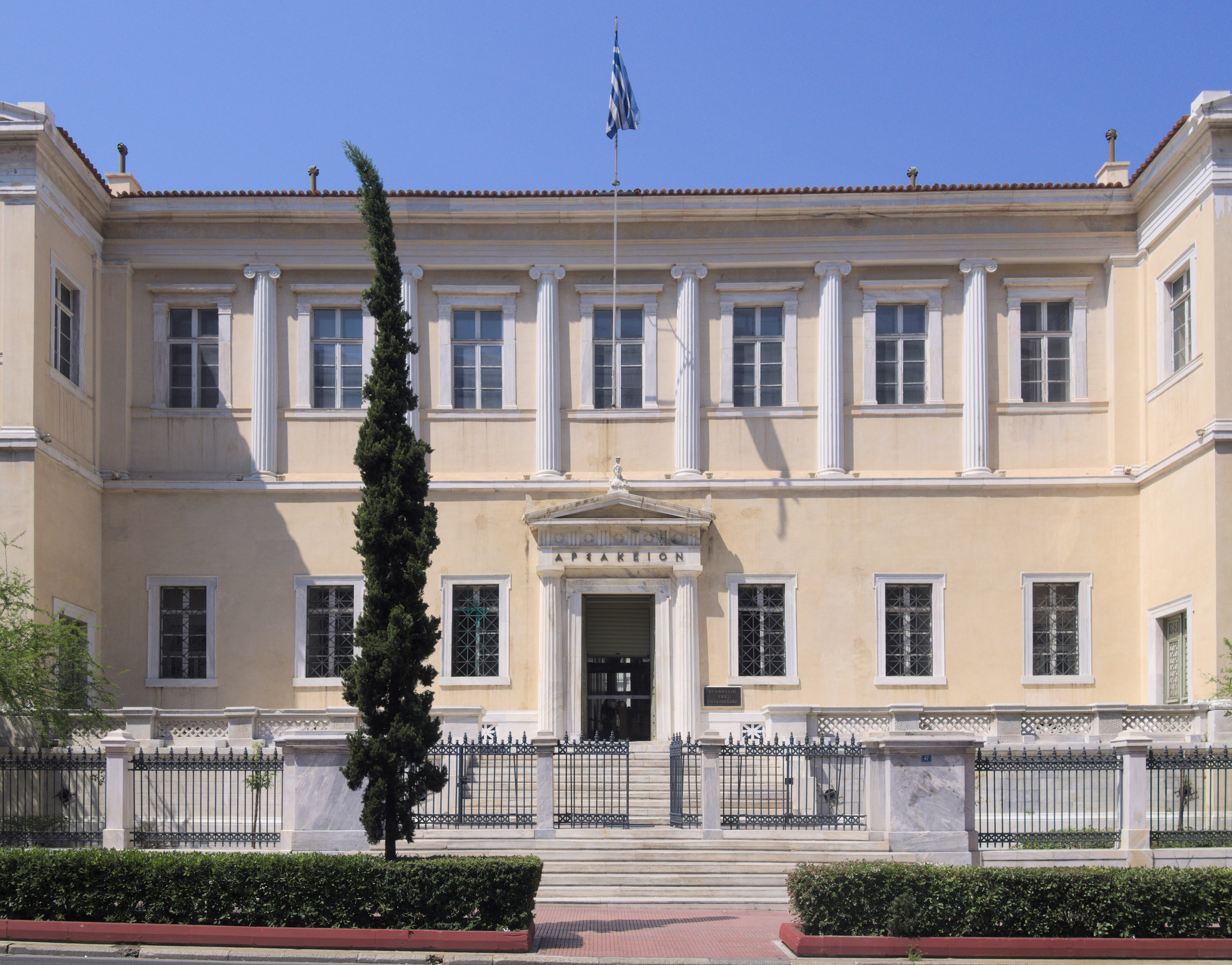
- Interactive map of Council of State
- Established: 1835, 1929 (refoundation)
- Location: Athens, Greece
- Website: www.adjustice.gr
- Currently: Evangelia Nika
- Since: June 30, 2022

The Council of State (Greek: Συμβούλιο της Επικρατείας) is the supreme court of administrative law of Greece (except in matters of public finance, which are the responsibility of the Court of Audit).

== Organization ==
The Council is headed by its president, who is chosen from among the members of the Council by the Cabinet of Greece for a term of four years. The court comprises the presiding board (the president and seven vice-presidents), 42 privy councillors, 48 associate judges and 50 reporting judges, all graduates of the National School of Judges.

The Council is seated in the former Arsakeion building in the centre of Athens.

The Council executes its jurisdiction in Plenary Session or in six Chambers-Judicial Formations ( Α', Β', Γ', Δ', Ε' and ΣΤ' ). Each Chamber may have two compositions: five-member or seven-member. The jurisdiction of the Plenary Session is determined by the law (Legislative Decree 170/1973, Article 14), while the competence of the Chambers is determined by the law and the presidential decrees, proposed by the Minister of Justice after an opinion of the Council.

After the Constitutional Amendment of 2001 the Plenary Session (and not the Chambers) is the only competent to judge the constitutionality of laws. The Plenary Session is, also, competent: a) for cases of general interest that the president introduces directly into it, b) for cases that one of the Chambers submits to it. These cases are submitted by the Chambers to the Plenary Session for two reasons: either because they are cases of general interest or because the applicable legislative provision is judged unconstitutional.

== History ==
The Council was first founded in 1835 and it constituted an imitation of the French Conseil d'État. It had advisory competence with respect to the draft decrees and administrative jurisdiction, issuing irrevocable decisions. The Council was suppressed by the Constitution of 1844 (article 102). Following the deposing of King Otto in 1862, the National Assembly that was convened decided to re-establish the Council in order to "prepare and deliberate on law proposals".

The new 1864 Constitution provided for a revision of this in the forthcoming parliamentary session, provided that a 3/4 majority voted against it. On 25 November 1865 a law was passed that abolished the Council of State again.

Although the Constitution of 1911 provided for its re-establishment, it was not refounded until 1928 (Law 3713/1928 as it has been repeatedly revised), after the adoption of the Constitution of 1927 (articles 102–105). Its first president, from 1928 until 1935, was Konstantinos Raktivan. Its jurisdiction and composition is now provided for in article 95 of the present constitution, the Law 170/1973 (as revised) and the Presidential Decree 18/1989.

== Administrative competence ==
The administrative competence of the Council, as one of the three Big Bodies of the Public Administration (the other two are the Chamber of Accounts and the Hellenic Legal Council) is regulated by the article 95 of the Constitution of 1974/1985/2001 and consists in the elaboration of all the regulative decrees, namely of all the decrees that include impersonal (nor referring to a particular person) legal rules.

Competent for this elaboration is the fifth (Ε' ) Chamber of the Council, composed, for such cases, of three or five members. The Chamber may, at its option, submit the case to the nine member Plenary Session. The submission is obligatory for the Chamber, when the constitutionality of the relevant to the decree legal provisions is judged (article 100 of the Constitution after the Amendment of 2001).

The Administration is obliged to send the regulative decrees to the Conseil for elaboration but it is not obliged to follow the consultory response of the Council. Nonetheless, the Administration usually abides by the Council's opinion.

A promulgated regulative decree, if not sent to the Council for elaboration before its promulgation, shall be annulled, if a recourse (writ of annulment) is submitted to the competent court (the Conseil d'Etat or the Administrative Court of Appeals).

The elaboration of the decrees by the Council is limited to the lato sensu legality (and the constitutionality of the relevant legal provisions) of the decrees, while the respective control of the French Conseil d'État goes to the substance of the context of the elaborated decree.

== Litigation ==
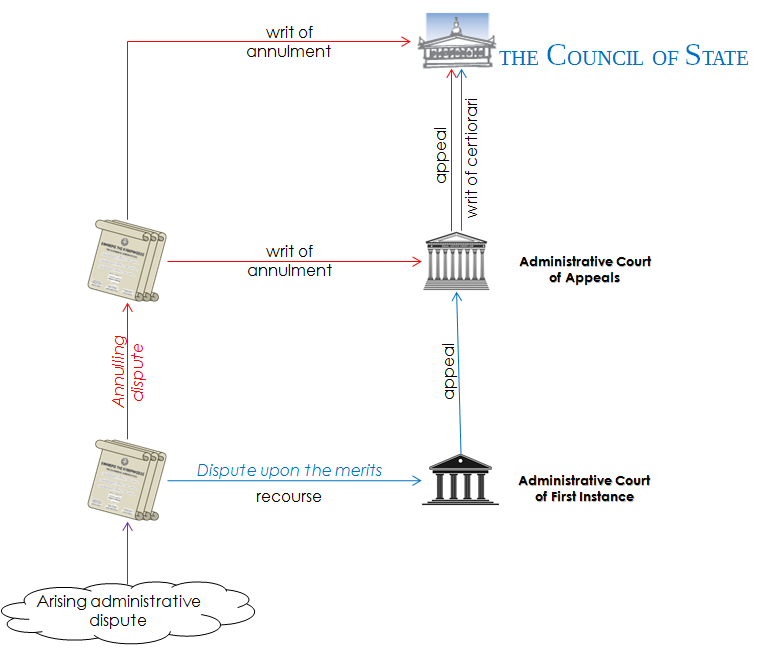
Brief block diagram of the litigation needed for resolving an arising administrative dispute in Greece.

The Council is the head of the system of administrative justice and it constitutes the Supreme Administrative Court. A case is introduced into the Council with the following legal means or remedies:

- the recourse (αίτηση ακύρωσης; the accurate translation is writ of annulment), with which the annulment of an administrative act is pursued. The Council judges only the legal aspects of the case and not the true facts. Its decision includes a judgement about legality and not a control upon the merits.
- the writ of certiorari (αίτηση αναιρέσεως) against the decisions of the lower administrative courts (Administrative Courts of First Instance and Administrative Courts of Appeals), which judge recourses (προσφυγές) and their decisions include a control upon the merits. The writ of certiorari is constitutionally consolidated (article 95 of the present constitution) and places the Council at the top of the administrative branch of justice, because it has the last word in the legal aspects of every administrative litigation.
- the clerical recourse, with which disputes between the State and the civil servants are introduced into the Council. The decision of the Council includes a judgement both about the legality and upon the merits of the case.
- the appeal against the decisions of the Administrative Court of Appeals, which judges at first instance certain writs of annulment (according to the provisions of the Law 702/1977). In this case, the Council judges as a court of appeals and the Administrative Court of Appeals as a court of first instance.

=== Acts of government ===
Following the jurisprudence of the French Conseil d'État, the Council refuses to examine the legality of certain administrative acts, which are called "acts of government". The Council includes in this limited category:

- acts regulating the relationships between the executive branch and the Parliament, such as the dissolution of the Parliament or the act proclaiming a referendum.
- acts connected with the foreign policy of Greece, such as international conventions, acts promulgated for the application of international treaties, acts relevant to the diplomatic protection of Greek citizens abroad, etc.
- the declaration of mobilisation.
- the granting of pardons.

=== Procedure ===
The procedure is based on the principles of the "inquisitorial system" and of the initiative of the litigant. According to this last principle the litigant is responsible for the commencement of the procedure.

== International relations ==
The Council of State is a founding member of the International Association of Supreme Administrative Courts and, since Greece’s accession to the European Union, of the Association of the Councils of State and Supreme Administrative Jurisdictions of the European Union. It also participates to the Venice Commission, the Council of Europe's advisory body on constitutional matters.

== Presidents ==
- Konstantinos Raktivan (1929–1935)
- Stamos Papafrangos (1935–1941)
- Panagiotis Triantafyllakos (1941–1943)
- Panagiotis Poulitsas (1943–1951), interim Prime Minister in April 1946
- Sotirios Souliotis (1951–1961)
- Charilaos Mitrelias (1961–1966), Deputy Prime Minister in October–November 1973
- Michail Stasinopoulos (1966–1969), interim President of the Republic in 1974–1975
- Alexandros Dimitsas (1969–1974)
- Georgios Marangopoulos (1974–1976)
- Othon Kyriakos (1976–1977)
- Nikolaos Bouropoulos (1977–1981)
- Angelos Iatridis (1981–1983)
- Themistoklis Kourousopoulos (1983–1988)
- Vasileios Rotis (1988)
- Vasileios Botopoulos (1988–1999)
- Christos Geraris (1999–2005)
- Georgios Papangiotopoulos (2005–2010)
- Panayiotis Pikrammenos (2010–16 May 2012), interim Prime Minister in May–June 2012
- Konstantinos Menoudakos (17 May 2012 – 30 June 2013)
- Sotirios Rizos (2013–2015)
- Nikolaos Sakellariou (2015–2018)
- Katerina Sakellaropoulou (2018–2020)
- Athanasios Rantos (2020)
- Mary Sarp (2020–2021)
- Demetrius Skaltsounes (2021–2022)
- Evangelia Nika (2022–current)

== See also ==
- Judicial system of Greece
