= Special Permanent Committee on Institutions and Transparency =

Committee of the Hellenic Parliament

The Special Permanent Committee on Institutions and Transparency (Greek: Επιτροπή Θεσμών και Διαφάνειας) is one of the four Special permanent committees of the Hellenic Parliament.

== 15th legislature (2012–14) ==
In the 15th legislature, the committee initially consisted of the following 13 MPs:

President

- Anastasios Nerantzis (Nea Dimokratia)

Vice Presidents

- Theodoros Dritsas (Syriza)
- Ioannis Dimaras (ANEL)

Initial members

- Nikos Tsoukalis (DIMAR)
- Zoi Konstantopoulou (Syriza)
- Panagiotis Lafazanis (Syriza)
- Manolis Kefalogiannis (Nea Dimokratia)
- Vyron Polydoras (Nea Dimokratia)
- Prokopis Pavlopoulos (Nea Dimokratia)
- Ioannis Tragakis (Nea Dimokratia)
- Michail Arvanitis-Avramis (Golden Dawn)
- Liana Kanelli (KKE)
- Apostolos Kaklamanis (PASOK)

In July 2013, the committee was enlarged, now encompassing 19 members. It was joined by the following MPs:

- Nikos Voutsis (Syriza)
- Theodora Tzakri (Syriza)
- Athanasios Bouras (Nea Dimokratia)
- John A. Kefalogiannis (Nea Dimokratia)
- Andreas Koutsoumbas (Nea Dimokratia)
- Dimitrios Tsoumanis (Nea Dimokratia)
- Panagiotis Rigas (PASOK)
