= Greek constitutional amendment of 2019 =

At the end of 2018, the then Prime Minister of Greece Alexis Tsipras announced his intention to amend the Constitution of Greece.

In total, 49 provisions were proposed for amendment, of which 16 were passed by a qualified majority (at least 180 votes) and in the following (Revision) Parliament need a simple majority (at least 151 votes) while a simple majority approved the remaining 33, but not by a qualified majority and will need a qualified majority by the (Revision) Parliament. The first phase of the revision took place on 15 February 2019 and the second one month later, on 15 March 2019, with a repeat vote, which finalized the provisions that would be revised, which were put to vote by the (Revision) Parliament (third and final phase) in the following months.

One of the main proposals is the decoupling of the election of the President of the Republic from snap elections, the exclusive ownership of national road networks and the provision of basic goods, such as electricity and water supply, by the state, the limitation of parliamentary immunity, the abolition of the Religious Oath by elected officials, the religious neutrality of the state, the establishment of simple proportional representation in national and local elections, the creation of a legislative framework for the holding of a referendum following the request of 500 thousand members of the electorate, and the exclusivity of the parliamentary office for the role of Prime Minister.

Also, two proposals by New Democracy did not qualify for revision, for the operation of private universities with the abolition of Article 16 and the election of the judiciary by parliament and not by government appointments.

The final vote was held on November 25. The Constitution was published in Government Gazette A 211/24.12.2019.

== Results ==
The most important change is the decoupling of the dissolution of the Parliament in case of failure to elect a President in the third vote. Specifically, according to Article 32 of the new Constitution, 5 votes are held, the first two with 200 votes and the third with 180 votes. If after 3 votes the President is not elected, the fourth will require 151 votes and the fifth will elect the candidate with the most votes.

Also, a new paragraph was added to Article 54 to potentially allow Greeks residing outside the Country to vote in their place of residence. The requirements would be the connection with Greece, previous live presence at a polling station, time of absence from Greece or presence in Greece for a certain period in the past. It also allows certain positions on the National Level ballot of each party to be occupied by Greeks living abroad, as well as the votes of voters who vote in polling stations outside of Greece not to be counted in a specific electoral district but only at the National Level.

Other important provisions include the amendments to Articles 68 and 86 regarding the liability of ministers and the compensation for their offences.

The proposed changes to Article 3 regarding the religious neutrality of the State and to Articles 13, 33 and 59 on the official recognition of the Civil Oath and the separation of state and church didn't pass.
