= Greek constitutional amendment of 2001 =

The Amendment of 2001 constituted the most important amendment of the Constitution of 1975. The Amendment of 1986 was much more limited, as it led to the modification of just a few articles concerning the President's powers.

The parliamentary procedure inaugurating the process of the Amendment was initiated by the government of PASOK and prime minister, Costas Simitis, in 1998. Three years later the 7th Revisionary Parliament decided on 83 proposed amendments and rejected 4 of them. Seven proposed amendments demanded a majority of 3/5. The 3/5 majority was already achieved for the other 76 proposals during the initial vote before the legislative elections of 2000. The amendment was officially concluded on the 17th of April 2001.

== Modifications ==
Some of the most important modifications were the following:

- Recognition of new Constitutional rights, such as the protection of personal data or access to information.
- Constitutional recognition of 5 Independent authorities.
- Addition of new provisions for the transparency of the operation of mass media.
- Constitutional consolidation of the doctrines of Proportionality and Vertical power of human rights.
- Provision of stringent preconditions for the modification of the electoral law.
- Prohibition of any professional occupation of the members of the Hellenic Parliament.
- Provision of a special organ, which will control any expenditure of the candidates during the elections.
- The creation of new consultative organs of the executive branch.
- The adoption of a new legislative framework for the criminal prosecution of the members of the Cabinet.
- The re-organization of the operation of the Parliament through the strengthening of the role of the parliamentary committees.
- The adoption of a 4-year term for all the heads of the Supreme Courts.
- The adoption of new provisions concerning the constitutional control of laws.
