= Constitution of Greece =

Fundamental law of Greece, in effect since 1975

- Coat of arms of Greece

Overview
- Original title: Σύνταγμα της Ελλάδος (1975, 1986); Σύνταγμα της Ελλάδας (2001, 2008, 2019)
- Jurisdiction: Greece
- Date effective: June 11, 1975
- System: Unitary, parliamentary, constitutional republic

Government structure
- Branches: 3
- Head of state: President of Greece (Note: holds legislative and executive powers according to article 26, paragraphs 1 and 2)
- Chambers: Unicameral (Hellenic Parliament)
- Executive: President of Greece; Government of Greece
- Judiciary: Supreme Civil and Criminal Court of Greece; Court of Audit; Supreme Administrative Court; Special Highest Court

History
- Amendments: 4 (1986, 2001, 2008, 2019)
- Last amended: 25 November 2019 (published 24 December)
- Supersedes: Constitution of 1952

Full text
- Constitution of Greece at Wikisource

The Constitution of Greece (Greek: Σύνταγμα της Ελλάδας, romanized: Syntagma tis Elladas) is the supreme law of Greece. It was drafted by the Fifth Revisionary Hellenic Parliament in 1974–1975, following the collapse of the Greek junta and the restoration of democracy under the Third Hellenic Republic. It came into force on 11 June 1975 (formally adopted on 9 June) and has since been amended four times: in 1986, 2001, 2008 and 2019.

The constitutional history of Greece goes back to the Greek War of Independence (1821–1832), during which the first three Greek constitutions were adopted by the revolutionary national assemblies. Syntagma Square (Plateia Syntagmatos) in Athens is named after the Constitution of 1843, which was the first constitution adopted in the modern Greek State following the 3 September 1843 Revolution.

== Structure ==
The Constitution consists of 120 articles, organised in four parts:

- The first part (articles 1–3), Basic Provisions, establishes Greece as a presidential parliamentary democracy (or republic — the Greek word δημοκρατία can be translated either way), and confirms the prevailing status of the Greek Orthodox Church as the dominant religion of the country. Article 3 specifically designates the Eastern Orthodox Christian faith as the "prevailing religion" of Greece, while guaranteeing freedom of religious conscience to all.
- The second part (articles 4–25), Individual and Social Rights, constitutes a bill of rights covering both civil and political and economic, social and cultural rights. The protection of these rights was significantly reinforced by the 2001 revision, which introduced new provisions on the protection of personal data, the right to the environment, and the role of independent authorities.
- The third part (articles 26–105), Organisation and Functions of the State, describes the structure and functioning of the three branches of government and the judiciary. Notably, Article 28 formally integrates international law and international conventions into the Greek legal order, giving them precedence over ordinary legislation.
- The fourth part (articles 106–120), Special, Final and Transitional Provisions, includes provisions on the social role of the state in the economy, as well as transitional arrangements.

== Key constitutional principles ==
The Constitution establishes several foundational principles:

- Popular sovereignty: Article 1 declares that "all powers derive from the People", who constitute the foundation of government.
- Separation of powers: Article 26 distributes legislative power to the Hellenic Parliament, executive power to the President of Greece and the Government of Greece, and judicial power to the courts.
- Rule of law: Article 25 provides for the protection of fundamental rights and obliges the State to guarantee effective judicial protection.
- Parliamentary confidence: The Government is accountable to Parliament and must enjoy its confidence (article 84).
- Unamendable provisions: Certain core provisions — including the republican form of government and the guarantees of fundamental rights — may never be revised (article 110).

== Constitutional amendments ==
The Constitution of 1975 has been revised four times:

- The 1986 amendment significantly reduced the powers of the President of Greece, shifting Greece from a semi-presidential system toward a more purely parliamentary republic. Most presidential powers of direct governance were transferred to the Prime Minister and cabinet.
- The 2001 amendment was the most extensive revision to date, affecting over 70 articles. It strengthened individual rights (including personal data protection and environmental rights), and established or reinforced several independent administrative authorities, including the Hellenic Data Protection Authority and the Greek Ombudsman.
- The 2008 amendment made targeted changes to a smaller number of articles, primarily concerning higher education (removing the constitutional prohibition on private universities) and reinforcing anti-corruption provisions.
- The 2019 amendment introduced changes relating to, among other things, the reduction of the parliamentary term for certain electoral effects, provisions on meritocracy in public administration, and new environmental protections.

== Constitutional revision procedure ==
Parliament has the right to revise or amend the Constitution, subject to explicit limits. The articles dealing with the republican "Form of the State" and those safeguarding fundamental human rights and freedoms are declared unalterable by Article 110.

The revision procedure is as follows:

1. A proposal for revision must be supported by at least one-sixth (1/6) of all Members of Parliament.
2. The proposal must be approved by a supermajority of three-fifths (3/5) of all MPs in two separate votes, held at least one month apart.
3. The power of revision is then transferred to the next Parliament, elected after the following legislative elections.
4. The new Parliament may ratify the revision by an absolute majority (50%+1). If the original proposal only achieved a simple majority (rather than the 3/5 threshold), then the new Parliament must approve it by a 3/5 supermajority.
5. A minimum of five years must elapse after the conclusion of a revision before a new one may be initiated.

A Parliament entrusted with the power of revision is officially designated a "Revisional Parliament" and is enumerated separately from ordinary parliamentary terms. The 1974–1975 Parliament was designated the "5th Revisional Parliament"; the 1986 Parliament the "6th Revisional"; and the 2001 Parliament the "7th Revisional Parliament". The 2007 Parliament was the "8th Revisional Parliament", and the Parliament that enacted the 2019 revision was the "9th Revisional Parliament".

== Constitutional history of Greece ==
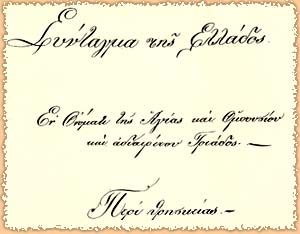
First words of the Greek Constitution of 1844.

During the modern history of Greece, the Constitution of 1975/1986/2001/2008/2019 is the most recent in a series of democratically adopted constitutions. The only exceptions were the constitutions of 1968 and 1973, which were imposed by the military dictatorship. The first modern Greek constitution was adopted in 1822, during the Greek War of Independence.

The current constitution is formally a major revision of the Constitution of 1952, as enacted by the 5th Revisional Parliament. In practice, however, it represents an essentially new constitutional order, incorporating the results of the 1974 referendum that definitively abolished the monarchy and established the republic.
