= Court of Audit (Greece) =

Highest Greek audit court, based in Athens

Hellenic Court of Audit
- Interactive map of Hellenic Court of Audit
- Established: 1833
- Jurisdiction: Greece
- Location: Athens
- Website: www.elsyn.gr/en

President: Sotiria Ntouni

The Hellenic Court of Audit is the supreme audit institution of the Hellenic Republic, auditing the use of public funds in Greece according to the principles of legality, regularity and sound financial management.

HCA is also the Supreme Financial Court, one of the three Supreme Courts of Justice, grounded on the Constitution, provides for its jurisdictional, advisory and auditing competences.

== History ==
The Hellenic Court of Audit (Ελεγκτικό Συνέδριο in Greek) – is one of the oldest institutions the Greek State has today. It was founded with the Decree of 27 September 1833, and it is modeled on the French Cour des comptes. Before the Hellenic Court of Audit, there was the earlier "Accounting and Auditing Council". This was a special body for the audit of public expenditures founded by the Governor Ioannis Kapodistrias, and which came into being with the Resolution of the Fourth National Assembly of 23 September 1829. It was accountable directly to the Governor. This institutional forerunner of the Hellenic Court of Audit (HCA) was entrusted with the revision of the Public Economy Accounts, as well as with the audit of the legality and regularity of the State expenditure. Ioannis Kapodistrias entrusted the organization of the "Council" to A. Regny, an envoy sent by the French Government. He came to Greece for this purpose in 1831. The inaugural meeting of the HCA took place in Nafplio on 14 October 1833.

A milestone in the development of the HCA was the Constitution of 1844 which stipulated in its Article 87 that the judges of the Court of Audit serve for life.

Law MΓ'/13.3.1864 followed, with which the regulation of pensions of the State was assigned to the HCA. It held this competence until 31.12.1968, when with Law 599/1968 it was removed and assigned to the then newly established Pension Service of the General Accounts of the State, and the HCA kept only its judicial duties in the field of Pensions,

Law AYOZ of 1887 assigned the a priori audit of the State expenditure to the HCA.

Then followed Law 400/1914. It regulates various issues concerning the persons and duties of the HCA staff, as well as the composition of its Departments. With this law, more responsibilities were given to the HCA. In 1919, with Law 1634, the municipal accounts audited until that time by the Prefectures came under the audit of the HCA.

The Constitution issued in 1925 further improved, with its article 103, the powers of the HCA.

An improvement of the HCA also takes place following the provisions of Article 98 of the 1952 Constitution, according to which its decisions can no longer be subject to the appellate control of the Council of State. The HCA thus acquires its own appeal procedure with Decree 2712/1953 for its Plenary Session, and it adjudicates exclusive jurisdiction cases concerning the imputation of accountants and the award of pensions.

Later on, the work of the HCA has been supplemented by a number of decrees, including Decree 321/1969 on Governmental Accounting, clearly establishing the principle that budget expenditure should be reported in detail and money was to be used only for intended purposes, and then including Decree 1265/1972 which classifies the judicial audit of public money into a priori and a posteriori audit.

The 1968 and the 1973 Constitutions redefine the responsibilities of the HCA. This had already occurred in the 1952 Constitution, but now it becomes more detailed.

The role of the HCA was outlined in the 1975 Constitution. Under article 98, the HCA is primarily responsible for auditing expenditure and monitoring the revenue of the State, as well as that of Local Government Agencies or of other Legal Entities. The HCA is also required to submit to Parliament both an Annual Report on the State's Annual Financial Statements and a Balance Sheet. Under the same article, the HCA adjudicates on cases concerning the audit of the accounts, pension grants and the civil liability of public servants. Furthermore, the HCA provides an expert opinion on laws regulating pensions, as well as on any other issue defined by law.

According to Law 2741/1999, the HCA carries out a legality audit of public works, procurements and services contracts made by the State, Public Entities or Public Enterprises, whenever the budget exceeds a certain amount. This competence has been upgraded to a constitutional level, according to the April 2001 constitutional reform.

Throughout the last years, the Hellenic Court of Auditors also participates in shaping a common design and planning cooperation with the European Court of Auditors and the audit institutions of the other Member States.

== Remits ==
The Court's jurisdictional, auditing and advisory competences are grounded on the Constitution of Greece.

HCA carries out audits of the expenditure and accounts of the State, local agencies and legal entities as provided for by law. It may also audit private entities if they are in receipt of public money.

HCA is required to submit to the Parliament the State's Budget Execution Report and Financial Statements (the Statement of Assurance) as well as an Annual Activity Report.

== Organisation ==
The Head of the Court of Audit is the President.

The Plenum of the Court is the governing body and is composed of the President, eight actively-serving vice-presidents and 33 Judge Counsellors. It conducts its proceedings in a Μajor and three Μinor formations.

=== Seven jurisdictional chambers ===
The First Chamber hears legal cases regarding imputation disputes related to the State, legal entities of private law that belong to the State, as well as the disputes from grants and any kind of financing of the State to private legal entities or individuals.

The Second Chamber hears legal cases regarding imputation disputes related to local governments, other legal entities under public law, private legal entities that belong to them, as well as disputes from grants and any kind of financing of the above to private legal entities or individuals.

The Third and the Fourth Chamber hear legal remedies related to pensions of civil servants and public officers. The Fifth and the Sixth Chamber hear legal remedies related to pensions of military officers and personnel.

The Seventh Chamber, which holds the presumption of jurisdiction, hears, in particular, resources against acts of the Court's Sections regarding pre-contractual audit, as well as legal remedies on imputation differences arising from financial corrections regarding EU funds & recoveries at the expense of public accounting officers.

The Audit Chamber: Chaired by the President himself, it is responsible for determining the Court's audit strategy, planning and monitoring of the annual and multiannual audit program, issuing all types of audit reports, planning and monitoring targeted audits, as well as elaborating the State's Budget Execution Report and Financial Statements (the Statement of Assurance) as well as the Annual Report.

=== Six jurisdictional sections ===
Three are responsible for pre-contractual audits, two deal with cases related to auditing and imputation, whilst the last one mainly deals with the Court's international relations.

=== The Advocate General Office ===
Inextricably embedded in the Court's organisational structure is the layer of the Advocate General, comprising the Advocate General, the Deputy Advocate General, and three Sub-Deputy Advocate Generals. These are all judges of the Court.

=== Organisational Structure – Audit Directorate ===
Three General Coordinators’ Services:

(a) General Coordinator's Service “Administration”, which is responsible for the secretarial support of the Court's formations and for the preparation and processing of the Court's personnel administrative affairs as well as for welfare and safety issues.

(b) General Coordinator's Service “Audit I”, which is responsible for Audit Planning and Support, Quality Control for the Court's regional units as well as for Documentation and Methodology.

(c) General Coordinator's Service “Audit II”, which is responsible for Audit Planning and Support and Quality Control with respect to the Court's units in Athens and Thessaloniki as well as Information Technology Audit and the Audit of the State's Budget Execution Report and Financial Statements. 55 Central Units 56 Regional Units.

=== The people of the Hellenic Court of Audit ===
- The President
- 10 actively-serving Vice-presidents
- 39 Judge-Counsellors
- 63 Appeal Judges
- 41 Junior Judges
- The Advocate General
- The Deputy Advocate General
- 3 Sub-Deputy Advocate Generals
- 14 General Directors
- 90 Directors
- 106 Chiefs of Division
- 443 Auditors
- 139 Secretaries
- 10 Bailiffs

== Products ==
The Hellenic Court of Audit as the Hellenic Supreme Financial Court and Audit Institution produces:

=== As the Supreme Audit Institution ===
==== Audit reports ====
Annual report on the Court's audit activities, including the results of its activities, observations stemming from its work, suggestions on reforms and improvements (including relevant laws).

Statement of Assurance on the State's Budget Execution Report and Financial Statements (the Statement of Assurance).

HCA conducts financial, compliance, internal control and performance audits and publishes the relevant audit reports according to its Annual Work Programme; It also produces reports as part of its cooperation with peer SAIs.

It reports on issues of general interest such as those arising from systemic weaknesses of public administration.

==== Administrative acts ====
Arising from ex post audits of the accounts of the accounting officers of the state and of the local government agencies or other legal entities, resulting in a decision of the competent HCA's Commissioner by which the accounts are either accepted as sound or rejected as illegal. In this latter case an administrative/or judicial act (depending on the financial importance of the deficit) will follow in order to recover the deficit.

==== Overviews ====
Monitoring of policy issues in various fields e.g. PFM

=== As the Supreme Financial Court ===
==== Judgements ====
in Cases arising from: – pensions; – audit of accounts; – civil liability of public employees for losses caused by them to the State, local agencies or public legal entities, intentionally or through gross negligence, in the course of their duties; and – liability of officials for unjustified increases in their wealth deemed to be the product of corruption (and unjustified according to the audit of their annual declarations of financial interests).

==== Judicial acts/judgements ====
in Cases arising from audits prior to the conclusion of contracts with a high financial value, awarded by the state or any other equivalent legal entity, as specified by law (pre-contractual audit).

==== Opinions on Legislation ====
The Court provides opinions on drafts of laws regarding pensions or on the recognition of service for pension entitlements, on any issue falling within its constitutional competence either at the request of Ministers or as deemed by law (e.g. opinions on PFM issues).

== See also ==
- Judicial system of Greece
