= 1985 Greek constitutional crisis =

- Date: 6 March – July 1985
- Location: Greece
- Result: Removal of Konstantinos Karamanlis as head of state; Election of a new president under dubious procedures; Constitutional amendments, strengthening the powers of the Prime Minister at the expense of the President, were passed

Lead figures
| Andreas Papandreou; Christos Sartzetakis | Konstantinos Mitsotakis; Konstantinos Karamanlis |

The Greek constitutional crisis of 1985 was the first constitutional dispute to occur in the newly formed Third Hellenic Republic after the fall of the country's military government in 1974. The crisis arose following a political gamble by the Prime Minister Andreas Papandreou, who suddenly announced he would not support the re-election of Konstantinos Karamanlis, President of Greece, for a second term. Papandreou had proposed constitutional amendments that would further increase the powers of the Prime Minister by reducing the presidential powers, which were acting as checks and balances against the executive branch.

Papandreou supported the presidential candidacy of Supreme Court justice Christos Sartzetakis, who was popular with left-leaning voters for his investigation of the politically motivated murder of Grigoris Lambrakis in 1963. The Hellenic Parliament elected Sartzetakis amid tensions and confrontations stemming from constitutionally questionable procedures initiated by Papandreou. The opposition, New Democracy, Karamanlis' former party that was led by Konstantinos Mitsotakis, deemed the vote illegal and threatened to remove Sartzetakis from the presidency if New Democracy won the upcoming elections, intensifying the crisis.

The polarized confrontation continued into the general election campaigns. Sartzetakis' election to the presidency helped Papandreou and his socialist party PASOK win the general election despite Papandreou's failure to address Greece's economic decline. After the election, all political parties accepted Sartzetakis as president, ending the constitutional crisis. The Greek constitutional amendment of 1986 transformed the liberal democracy of Greece based on the constitution of 1975 into a populist democracy with a majoritarian parliamentary system and a prime minister acting as a "parliamentary autocrat".

Soon after the constitutional amendments took effect, Papandreou's premiership was engulfed by corruption scandals, the most significant of which was the Koskotas scandal. With no constitutional restraints, Papandreou abused his position to prevent the Koskotas case from advancing in the courts, and he promised to deplete the state's finances to his loyal supporters. After he lost the June 1989 general election, a coalition government consisting of conservative New Democracy and united leftist parties under Synaspismos indicted Papandreou and four of his ministers. The new government also ended the state's monopoly on mass media, and partially dismantled the state's surveillance capabilities to prevent any future prime minister from exploiting them for political advantage. Since then, constitutional scholars have suggested partially reversing the removal of presidential powers to mitigate the negative effects of majoritarian politics while avoiding potential conflicts between the president and prime minister.

== Brief history of Constitutional crises in Greece ==
=== Early constitutional struggles ===
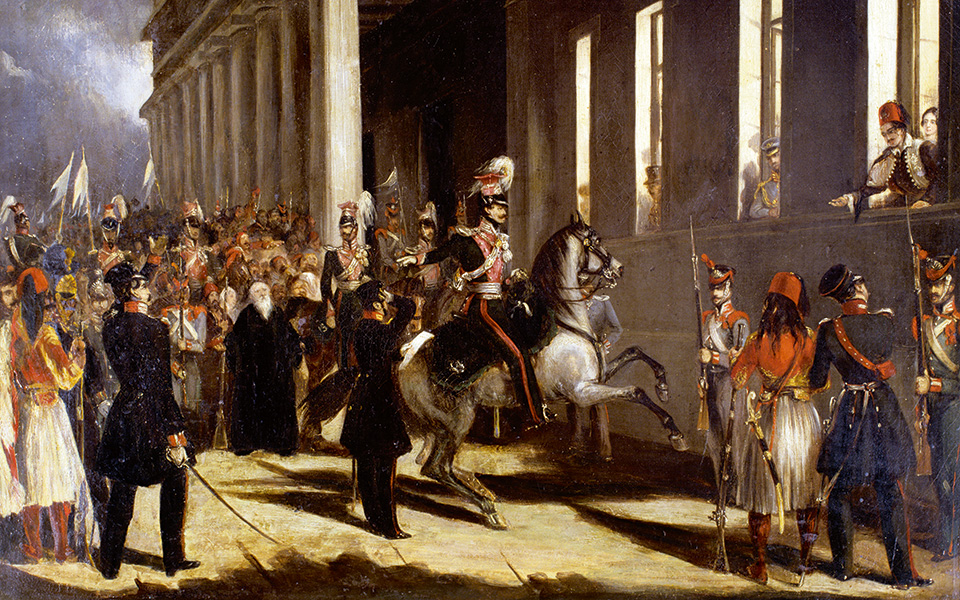
General Dimitrios Kallergis on horseback approaching King Otto and his wife Amalia at the windows of the Old Royal Palace to demand for a Greek constitution

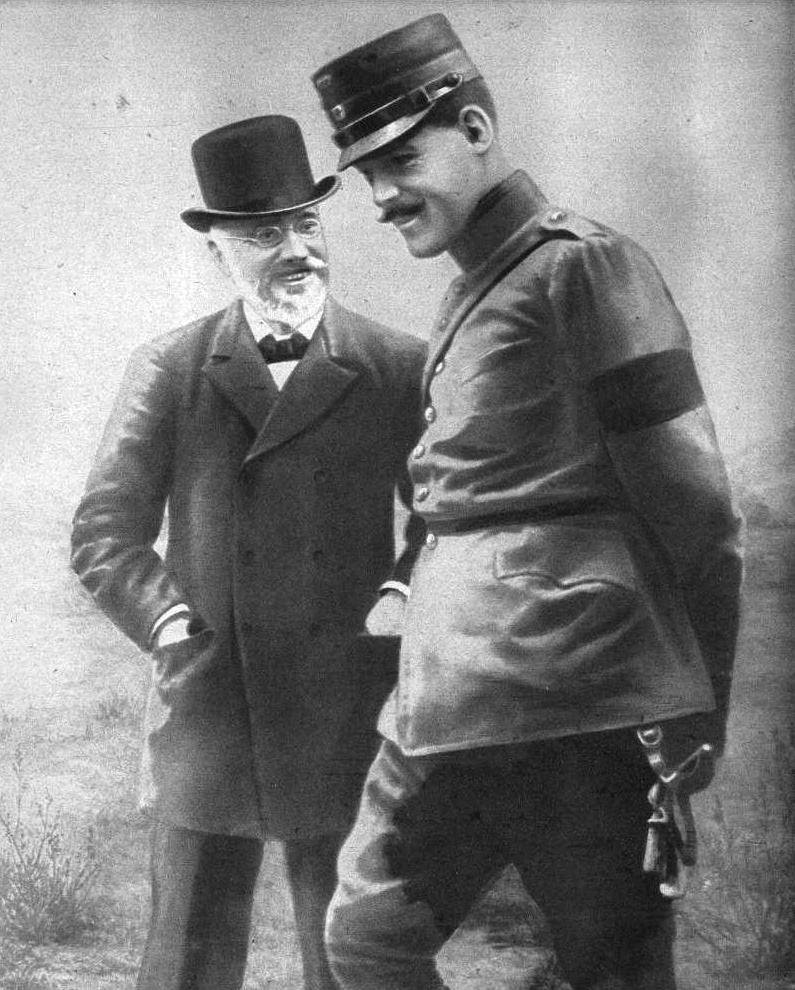
Constantine I of Greece and Eleftherios Venizelos. Their disagreement caused the National Schism that echoed over decades in the history of Greece.

Since gaining independence in 1821, Greece has experienced persistent instability. Early governments were weak and burdened by debt from the independence struggle, while rivalries among elites and limited political cohesion led to conflict with Prime Minister Ioannis Kapodistrias, ending in his assassination. Soon after, foreign creditors and the European Great Powers imposed a foreign monarchy with absolute authority. Throughout the 19th century, tensions deepened between citizens seeking broader political participation and elites aligned with the crown and external interests, contributing to repeated military interventions and a series of coups into the 20th century.

Early military movements secured reforms, notably the 3 September 1843 Revolution, which established a constitutional monarchy. The 1909 Goudi coup brought Eleftherios Venizelos to power, modernized the country and expanded its territory. However, his clash with King Constantine I over Greece's entry into World War I divided Greek society and the armed forces, and became known as the National Schism. This turmoil produced a short-lived republic (1924–1935) before the monarchy was restored, followed by further authoritarian rule under Ioannis Metaxas in 1936.

=== Conservative rule (1946–1963) ===
The Axis occupation of Greece in World War II and the 1944–1949 Civil War between the Communist-led uprising against the monarchist establishment caused severe economic damage and deep social divisions. After martial law ended, weak post-civil-war governments relied heavily on US aid through the Marshall Plan and focused on containing communism during the Cold War. Political dialogue in the following decades revolved around shifting power from the right to the center, however, reconciliation remained a lower priority than economic reconstruction. Shifting control of the military from the king to the elected government was another difficult subject.

The 1952 Constitution, though based on that of 1911, was effectively a new constitution. It established a parliamentary monarchy with the monarch as head of state and the army, based on the principle of the separation of powers. The prime minister was elected as the leader of the government and to carry out executive functions. However, the king retained significant powers to control the government, including the power to dissolve parliament and appoint and dismiss ministers. The latter led to confusion since two prime ministers in the 1950s asked whether the king or the prime minister governed the country, echoing the disagreements between Venizelos and Constantine I during the National Schism.

From 1955 to 1963, the governorship of Konstantinos Karamanlis brought relative stability and economic prosperity to Greece. He also sought to reduce the monarch's prerogatives but failed to gain sufficient political support to overcome the king's resistance. By the early 1960s, repressive postwar policies were increasingly questioned, especially after the death of left-wing Member of Parliament (MP) Grigoris Lambrakis, which implicated state officials in the assassination or in its cover-up. Although not blamed, Karamanlis resigned and went into self-exile in France.

=== Rise of center-left and friction with the king ===
Georgios Papandreou and his political party, Center Union, had a moderate reformist platform; it gained considerable traction and rose to power in the parliamentary elections of 1963 and 1964. Papandreou advocated for the liberalization of Greek society, which was rapidly urbanizing, resulting in large salary increases for police, judges, and teachers. Papandreou's government also released all political prisoners as a first step toward reconciliation from the Civil War. Resentment toward Papandreou from the military grew because they were excluded from salary increases. He also attempted to bring parts of the military that operated independently under government control. This action alarmed many officers without weakening them. Papandreou's move created friction with King Constantine II, who wanted the monarchy to retain command of the army.

At the same time, the son of Georgios Papandreou, Andreas Papandreou, who had joined Greek politics after a 23-year academic career in the United States, was campaigning on an anti-monarchy and anti-American platform, destabilizing the political equilibrium. Andreas Papandreou's uncompromising militant stance made him a target of conspiratorial accusations from ultra-rightists, who feared that following new elections, which the nearly 80-year-old Georgios Papandreou would likely win, his son would be the focus of power in the party. These incidents caused a dispute between Georgios Papandreou and King Constantine II, leading to the resignation of the former.

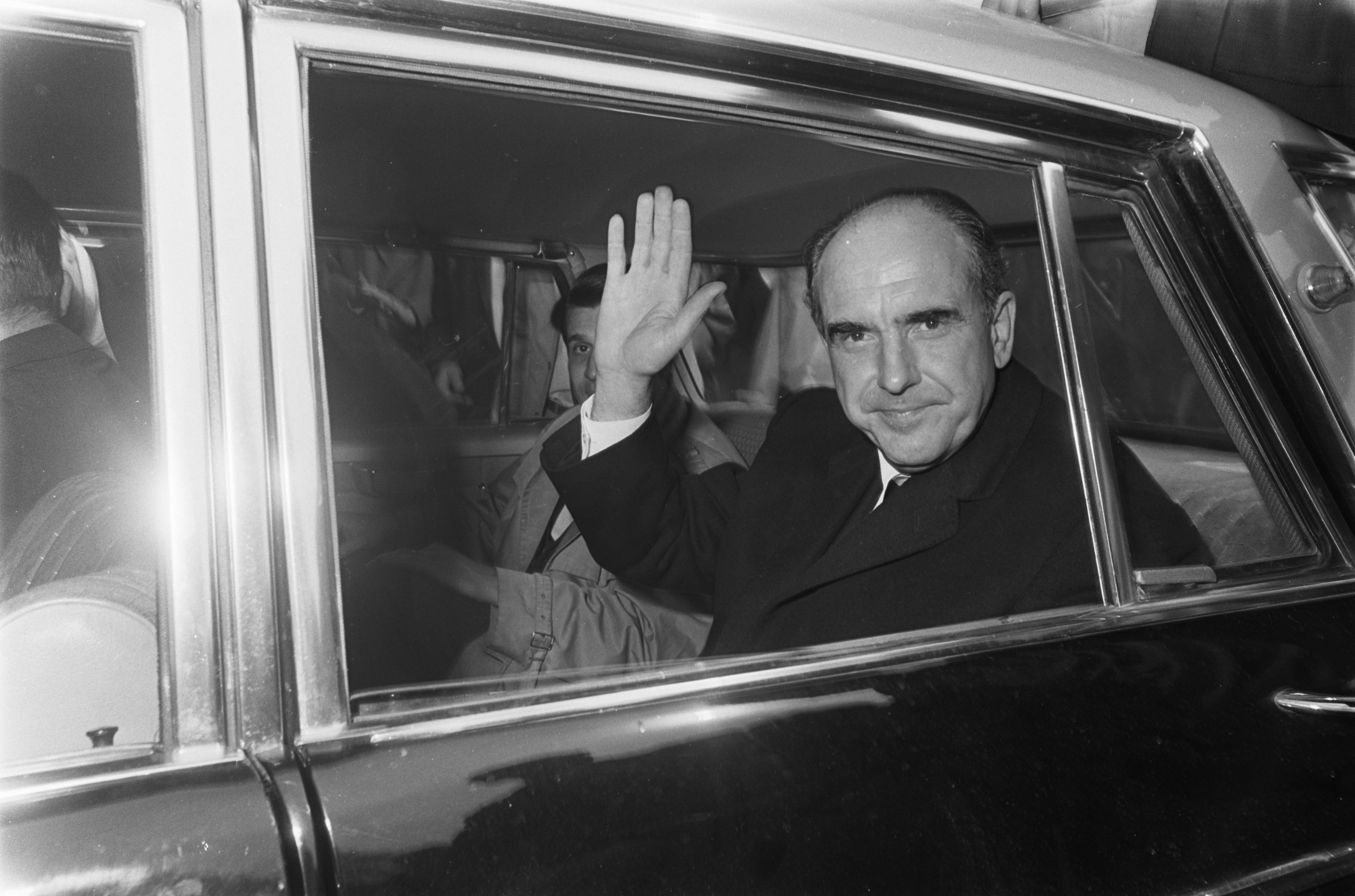
Andreas Papandreou in exile

For the next twenty-two months, Greece had no elected government, and hundreds of demonstrations took place, with many being injured and killed in clashes with the police. The king, potentially acting within his constitutional rights but politically dubious approach, tried to gain support from members of the Center Union party and form a government, leading to the Iouliana (July events) of 1965. Constantine temporarily succeeded in gaining the support of 45 members, including Konstantinos Mitsotakis, who were later called "apostates" by supporters of the elder Papandreous. To end the political deadlock, Georgios Papandreou attempted a more-moderate approach with the king, but Andreas Papandreou publicly rejected his father's effort and attacked the whole establishment, attracting the support of 41 Center Union members in an effort to gain the party's leadership and prevent any compromise.

The prolonged political instability between the parliament and the monarchy led to a military coup in which a junta of colonels seized power and ruled Greece for seven years. The junta expelled prominent political figures, including Andreas Papandreou, Mitsotakis, and King Constantine. The political world almost universally blamed Andreas Papandreou, and even his father disowned him, as the person primarily responsible for the end of Greek democracy. In exile, the younger Papandreou, cut off from those working for the restoration of democracy in Greece, developed and disseminated an anti-American, conspiratorial narrative of events in which he was a victim of larger forces. Following the junta's collapse, caused by its failure to handle the Turkish invasion of Cyprus, the dominant political figure, Karamanlis, returned to restore democratic institutions in Greece.

== Restoration of democracy and Constitution of 1975 ==
=== Return of Karamanlis ===
With the return of civilian rule under Karamanlis, the new government issued a "Constituting Act" that voided the junta's Constitution of 1973. Pending a referendum on a new constitution, the 1952 constitution was temporarily restored, "except for the articles dealing with the form of the State"; the last phrase referred to whether the monarchy would be restored. In the meantime, the functions of the monarch were to be carried out by the incumbent President, Phaedon Gizikis, whom the junta had appointed as a nominal figurehead.

=== Features of the new constitution and first objections ===
In the November 1974 parliamentary election, Karamanlis received 54.37% of the vote and a mandate to set the foundations of the new state. In the following month's republic referendum, 69% of voters chose a parliamentary republic with a president as head of state and commander-in-chief of the armed forces, effectively ending 150 years of monarchical rule. This led to the foundation of the Third Hellenic Republic with the new Constitution of 1975, which reinforced the executive branch's power, represented by the prime minister, while the president would act as the head of state with sufficient reserve powers, the right to call elections, appoint a government, dissolve Parliament, and call referendums on important national questions. The president could also veto any legislation that did not reflect the popular will, and this veto could only be overturned by a three-fifths parliamentary majority. The presidential powers, which exceeded those of the monarch under the 1952 Constitution, were inspired by the recent Gaullism reforms in France.

Despite vocal resistance from leftist parties, which wanted a purely parliamentary system with a ceremonial president, Karamanlis insisted these powers would act as checks and balances to avoid an omnipotent prime minister who could accumulate executive and legislative powers with no restraint. Parliament adopted the new constitution and it was promulgated on 11 June 1975. Andreas Papandreou, along with the communists, boycotted the promulgation; he publicly described it as "totalitarian", advocating instead for a socialist constitution.

=== Reforms by Karamanlis ===
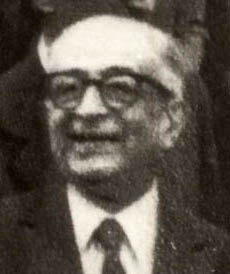
Konstantinos Tsatsos, the first president of the Third Hellenic Republic

From 1975 to 1980, Karamanlis and his close associate Konstantinos Tsatsos governed Greece as prime minister and president, respectively. The reconciliation of the Civil War was becoming urgent; Karamanlis had legitimized the Communist Party of Greece (KKE), which was outlawed since November 1947 during the Civil War, re-ratified the European Convention on Human Rights, and allowed exiled Greeks who had fled the junta and Civil War, including Melina Mercouri, Mikis Theodorakis, and Cornelius Castoriadis, to return home. Approximately 25,000 Greeks returned from 1974 to 1981. Karamanlis' governments, however, maintained the country's anti-communist stance. Minister of Interior Konstantinos Stefanopoulos said: "Greeks would never forgive those who had taken up arms against the Nation".

=== EEC membership and rise of PASOK ===
Papandreou and his newly formed political party, PASOK, rose in popularity due to pressure from the 1973 and 1979 oil crises on the Greek economy, and Papandreou's radical, mostly anti-American and anti-EEC. In 1980, after Karamanlis secured the entry of Greece into the European Economic Community (EEC), he became president and Georgios Rallis became prime minister. Andreas Papandreou won the 1981 Greek parliamentary election and became prime minister. In the views of Greece's allies, Karamanlis, as president, would act as a restraining factor on radical departures in foreign and domestic affairs if Papandreou realized his campaign promises.

=== Reforms by Papandreou ===
Papandreou took further steps toward social reconciliation by allowing the potential return of another 22,000 Greeks by ending security screening; the most notable was Markos Vafiadis. In 1985, Papandreou introduced a law allowing civil servants dismissed for political reasons to restore their pensions. All formal Civil War commemorations were abolished. The first, 1949 law recognizing the Greek Resistance excluded left-leaning partisan groups that fought against the Greek State in the Civil War. On 20 September 1982, Papandreou's government abolished this exception, allowing EAM/ELAS members war-veteran status and pension rights.

Papandreou, unlike Karamanlis's inclusive approach, instrumentalized Greece's divided past by regularly invoking the memories of the Civil War ("right the wrongs of the past") and "revenge of the losers [of the Civil War]" (Greek: "η ρεβάνς των ηττημένων") to maintain the support of left-leaning supporters by demonstrating to them PASOK's faithfulness to its campaign promises and left-wing roots. For Papandreou, polarization was necessary to distract his supporters from his mishandling of the chronic stagflation of the Greek economy, despite the country receiving economic aid from the EEC. Nevertheless, the cohabitation of the two men from 1981 to 1985 was successful because Papandreou's governance was more pragmatic compared to his radical, polarizing rhetoric, and many of his campaign promises were reversed.

== Constitutional crisis ==
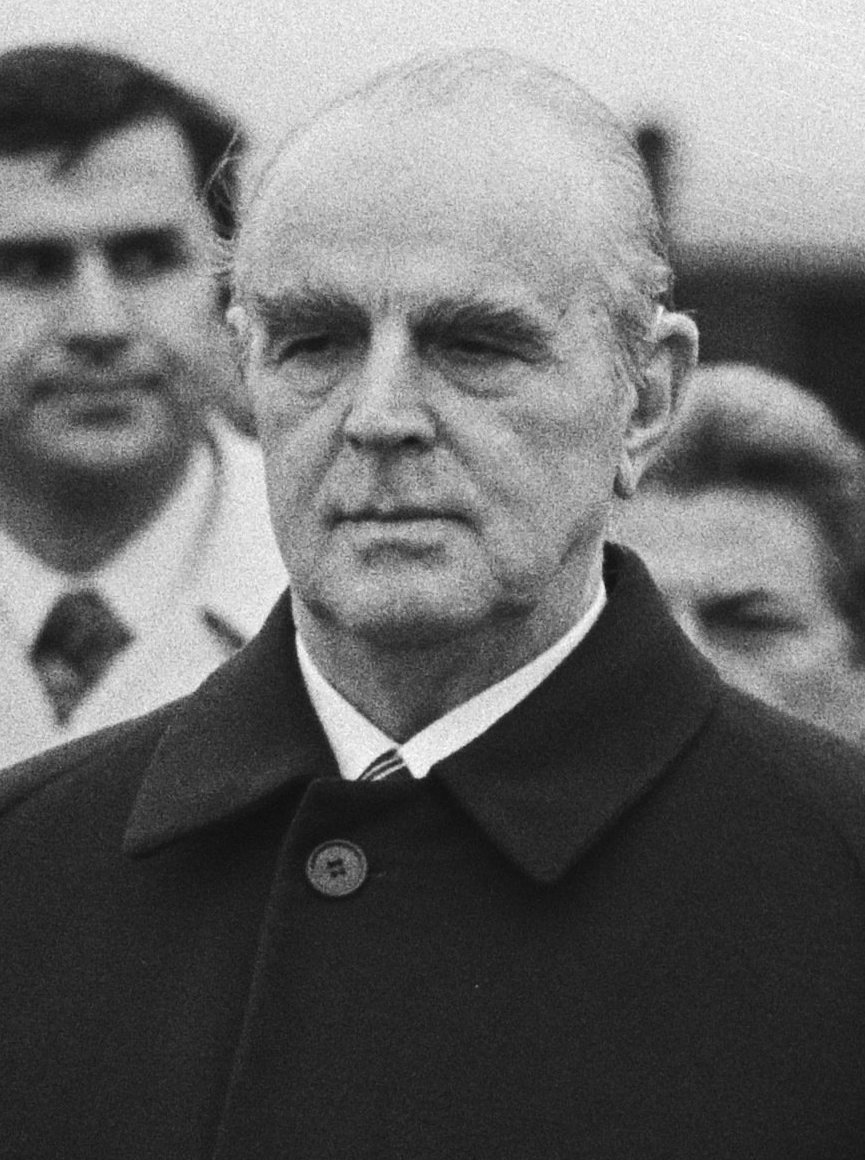
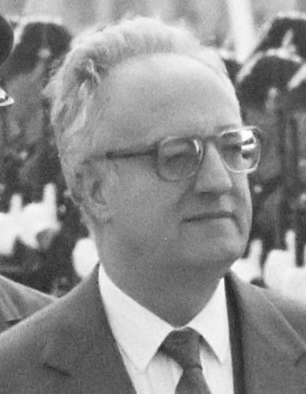
Presidents of the Hellenic Republic, Konstantinos Karamanlis (left) and Christos Sartzetakis (right)

=== First stage ===
On 6 March 1985, New Democracy announced it would support Karamanlis' second Presidency term, while on the same day, the KKE party announced it would put forward its candidate. The press anticipated Papandreou would also support Karamanlis, because he had personally assured Karamanlis of his support. Papandreou, however, changed his mind at the last moment, siding with the left wing of PASOK, which did not want Karamanlis, and instead backed Christos Sartzetakis, a Supreme Court judge known for his principled handling of the 1963 murder of left-wing deputy Grigoris Lambrakis and favorably viewed by the left. The announcement occurred at the Central Committee of PASOK on 9 March. This move surprised some of Papanderou's ministers, much of his party's rank-and-file, and Sartzetakis himself, who was not consulted in advance. Later, it was revealed that the supposedly spontaneous change of mind was to camouflage Papandreou's long-held constitutional designs because Sartzetakis knew about it well in advance, and because two other judicial figures had rejected Papandreou's offer. At the same time, Papandreou announced plans for a constitutional reform, which restarted the debate about the form of the republic, and further polarized the political environment by damaging the consensus between the two dominant political parties, PASOK and New Democracy, that existed between 1981 and 1985.

Papandreou also argued it would be illogical for Karamanlis to preside over any constitutional reform because he had influenced much of the 1974 constitution. Mitsotakis accused Papandreou of creating a constitutional crisis to remove Karamanlis from office and establish a totalitarian constitution. Papandreou informed Karamanlis of his decision via his deputy, Antonios Livanis, because he could not bring himself to do so in person. In response, Karamanlis resigned from the Presidency on 10 March 1985, two weeks before the end of his term, and was replaced by PASOK's Speaker of the Hellenic Parliament, Ioannis Alevras, as acting president.

Scholars differ on the motive behind Papandreou's actions. According to the historians John Koliopoulos and Thanos Veremis, and political scientist Kevin Featherstone, the crisis was motivated by Papandreou's desire to divert the Greek electorate's attention from the worsening state of the Greek economy; unemployment increased under PASOK from 2.7% in 1980 to 7.8% in 1985, annual inflation of the order of 20%, widening trade deficits. According to a public-opinion survey by Eurobarometer, the number of Greeks who believed the economic situation worsened increased from 37.7% in 1983 to 70.2% in 1985, while those who believed the economy improved fall from 31.5% to 12.8% in the same period. Constitutional scholar Aristovoulos Manesis argued that the constitutional revision was a pretext to justify the removal of Karamanlis, which would remind left-leaning voters, as the elections were approaching, that PASOK remained faithful to its revolutionary left-wing origins.

=== Vote eligibility of the acting president ===
The opposition questioned whether Alevras could participate in the parliamentary vote for his successor, requesting to be precluded from the presidential vote and his deputy rights while acting president. The Constitution of 1975 states the president's office is incompatible with any other office (Article 30). Constitutional scholars supported this view. Academic Nikolaos Saripolos said only the Constituent Assembly could determine whether Alevras could vote. PASOK said there was no explicit provision in the constitution, so this issue should be resolved in Parliament, an opinion from Grigorios Kasimatis, a friend of Papandreou. Ultimately, the PASOK-dominated parliament decided to allow the vote, and New Democracy deputies vacated the chamber. PASOK deputy Agamemnon Koutsogiorgas later said in Parliament the issue raised by constitutional scholars on Alevras' ineligibility to vote due to Article 30 in the Constitution applies only to elected presidents, and therefore did not apply to Alevras.

=== Parliamentary votes for president and colored ballots ===
According to the Constitution of 1975, up to three rounds of a parliamentary vote were permitted for presidential candidates; the first two rounds required more than 200 votes out of 300 MPs, and in the third round, 180 votes out of 300. If all three rounds failed, new elections would be held. Papandreou, who since 1981 had expelled six PASOK MPs for criticizing him, could only rely upon approximately 164 MPs; 13 MPs from the KKE, and five independent MPs (about 182). The first two rounds, which took place on 17 and 23 March, failed to elect Sartzetakis as president. The elections were carried out in conditions of high political tension; at one point, a New Democracy deputy momentarily grabbed the ballot box.

As in the previous rounds, in the third round on 29 March, colored ballots in blue for Sartzetakis and semi-transparent envelopes were used. New Democracy chairman Mitsotakis accused Papandreou of violating the constitutional principle of secret ballot (Article 32), by forcing his deputies to cast their vote with colored ballots. However, Mitsotakis' concern was dismissed in Parliament. Mitsotakis and Papandreou argued verbally; Mitsotakis said Papandreou had no respect for the Parliament, and Papandreou responded by invoking Mitsotakis' role in the Iouliana and said Mitsotakis was the last person entitled to speak about respect. Despite vigorous protests from the opposition, PASOK members used colored ballots under strict surveillance to spot potential defectors. PASOK supporters chanted outside the Parliament building.

Sartzetakis was voted president with a decisive vote from Alevras because two MPs from Papandreou's party, whom Papandreou accused of taking bribes from Mitsotakis' party, defected. Mitsotakis considered the vote illegal and said that if New Democracy won the elections, Sartzetakis would not be president, by bringing the legality of the process to the Council of State (Greek: Συμβούλιο Επικρατείας), further deepening the constitutional crisis.

=== Foreign policy dimension ===
Foreign observers were worried that Papandreou had taken a risk with potentially dire consequences for Greece and its allies. According to McDonald, a victory for Mitsotakis in the upcoming elections would destabilize Greece over the presidency question. Alternatively, an electorally-weakened Papandreou might lead to a collaboration with the communist party to form a government, which according to John C. Loulis, a conservative Greek political analyst, "raised a potential danger to the balance of power in the Mediterranean" due to the possibility of communists shaping Greece's foreign policy and disrupting the communications in the North Atlantic Treaty Organization (NATO).

=== Constitutional proposals and debate ===
With Sartzetakis as president, Papandreou could formally submit the constitutional amendment proposals by adding to the previous one the removal of the secret ballot for president. In contrast with constitution violations raised in Sartzetakis's election, PASOK's procedure for proposing constitutional amendments complied with the constitution. The surprising announcement of constitutional reform under already tense political conditions and limited input from constitutional scholars on the nature of amendments increased the possibility of the crisis becoming widespread. Papandreou's proposals were designed to ease future changes to the constitution's Article 110 by requiring the approval of amendments by a parliamentary majority in one rather than two successive parliaments, and reducing the powers of the President. The former proposal was eventually abandoned due to its controversial nature, but Papandreou was determined to eliminate the presidential powers. Papandreou cited the hypothetical case of an activist president, mimicking the tendency of monarchs to intervene in political life since the creation of the modern Greek state. PASOK minister Anastasios Peponis introduced the constitutional amendment package to the Parliament with the following argument:

Invoking the lack of use of some provisions, their lack of implementation is by no means an argument to keep them in the current constitution. The question is what is our guiding principle? When provisions directly or indirectly contradict the principle of popular sovereignty, we object to them. [...] We support that the president is neither directly appointed by nor elected by the people. We are not a presidential, we are a parliamentary democracy. It is not the president who resorts to the people, so that the people deliver a verdict by majority voting. It is the legitimate government. It is the political parties. If the president resorts to the people, then he inevitably either sides with one party against others or attempts to substitute himself for the parties and impose his own solution. Nevertheless, as soon as he attempts to substitute himself for the parties and impose his own solution, then he embarks upon the formation of his own decisions of governmental nature. Then the government, directly or indirectly, fully or partially, is abolished.

Scholars considered such constitutional changes unnecessary because no president had used these powers in the course of the Third Hellenic Republic until Papandreou raised the issue. Anna Benaki-Psarouda, New Democracy's rapporteur, presented in the parliament the following argument against the proposed reforms:

And this is the achievement of the 1975 Constitution: A miraculous balance between the Parliament, the Government and the President of the Republic, namely these state organs which express popular sovereignty and always pose the risk of de facto usurping it. [...] It is also interesting to see where these competencies of the President of the Republic are transferred. They are removed from him, but where do they go? To popular sovereignty and the Parliament, as the parliamentary majority claims? Dear colleagues, all of them go to the government, either directly or indirectly through the parliamentary majority controlled by it. Because the parliament is now subjugated to the parliamentary majority through party discipline. [...] Dear colleagues, the conclusion from the amendments suggested by the government or the parliamentary majority is the following: Power is transferred completely to the government. Hence, we have every reason to be afraid and suspect and mistrust about the future of Greece. [...] I want to stress the following, so that we, the Greek people, understand well: that with the suggested amendments you turn government and government majority into superpowers.

Benaki-Psarouda said this type of majoritarianism would damage Greek democracy. Scholars also noted the proposed changes would make the prime minister the most powerful position in the Greek state because there would no constitutional restraints.

=== Election campaign of 1985 ===
The logo of PASOK depicts a rising sun. Papandreou implied in his election campaign in 1985 that PASOK represented the "forces of light" while the opposition the "forces of darkness".

The confrontation from the presidential election continued into the general election campaigns and increased the political polarization in Greek society. Papandreou invoked memories of the Civil War (1946–1949) and Junta (1967–1974), associating New Democracy with the authoritarian right of the past, with the slogan: "Vote PASOK to prevent a return of the Right". The communists, persecuted by the right in the 1950s, protested against Papandreou's dwelling on the past, saying the 1980s were not the same as the 1950s. Papandreou further characterized the upcoming elections as a fight between light and darkness in his rallies, implying PASOK represented the "forces of light" because its logo was a rising sun. On the other side, Mitsotakis said: "In voting, the Greek people will also be voting for a president", and warned that there was a danger of moving toward an authoritarian, one-party state.

Two days before the elections, Karamanlis urged Greeks to be cautious with their votes, saying PASOK had brought "confusion and uncertainty". Karamanlis' statement was not broadcast on television or radio, which were controlled by the state and PASOK, the governing party.

In the election, PASOK was re-elected with 45.82% of the vote, losing approximately 2.3% of its support from 1981, while New Democracy increased its share of the vote by 4.98% to 40.84%. Papandreou's gamble worked to his benefit because he gained from far-left voting blocks, covering the losses from centrist voters, and appealed to socialist voters who rejected Karamanlis's perceived hindrance of PASOK's policies. Papandreou held an advantage over Mitsotakis by portraying him as a threat to the existing constitutional order and suggesting that Mitsotakis intended to place the former king Constantine as the head of state, convincing a significant fraction of Greek voters. Historian Richard Clogg said the large-scale rally by Mitsotakis on 2 June at Syntagma Square may have panicked communists into voting for PASOK; the communist parties lost a significant share of the vote.

== Aftermath ==
After the election results, Mitsotakis accepted Sartzetakis as president and head of state. Papandreou's constitutional proposals took effect in 1986.

=== Court ruling ===
The case reached the courts. The plenary session of the Council of State ruled the direct judicial review of the election of the President was inadmissible. The Athens One-member Magistrates' Court's ruling in passing that the election of the President was irregular and "amounted to an abrogation of popular sovereignty", while it held that the political legitimacy granted by PASOK's 1985 election victory did not negate the unconstitutionality of the act. Constitutional scholar Christos Papastylianos called the latter an example that displays the limits of judicial jurisdiction in Greece; the courts can deem an action as unconstitutional but are unable to prevent it.

=== Disillusionment and abuse of power ===
Papandreou began his second administration with a comfortable majority in parliament and increased powers granted by the amended constitution. However, economic and social conditions in Greece deteriorated. His premiership was interspersed with financial and corruption scandals, such as the Koskotas scandal, a money-laundering operation that threatened the PASOK government because it implicated Papandreou and many senior PASOK ministers. In 1985, Papandreou accepted a loan from the EEC and implemented austerity measures as a condition of the loan. After two years, Papandreou, shaken by PASOK's waning popularity, reversed the austerity measures, resulting in a further deterioration of the Greek economy. After the repeal of anti-terrorism legislation in the early 1980s and controversial foreign policy decisions a number of significant terrorist incidents in Greece took place, culminating in the 1989 assassination of Member of Parliament Pavlos Bakoyannis.

The lack of constitutional restraints made Papandreou the embodiment of this concentration of power and the target of blame for everything that went wrong in the country. Papandreou took a number of actions to further secure his position:

- Papandreou changed the electoral law shortly before the June 1989 general election, a move designed to prevent New Democracy from winning an absolute majority.
- Bestowing public appointments to about 90,000 people to gain additional votes six months before the 1989 election; the party Synaspismos called this a "recruitment orgy". The public sector, which had already been bloated and a burden on the economy before Papandreou's rule, became even more so during the 1980s. Papandreou's blatant patronage was exemplified by him, at one of his rallies, publicly commanding his Minister of Finance Dimitris Tsovolas to "give it all [to them]" (Greek: Τσοβόλα δώσ'τα όλα) and ordering, "Tsovolas, empty the coffers [of the state]", and the crowd chanted these back.
- During judicial inquiries into the Koskotas scandal, it was revealed that Papandreou used the Junta's surveillance infrastructure, including filing and wiretapping, against any Greek citizen who was not loyal to him. The list of "suspected terrorists", according to Papandreou, included prominent politicians across the political spectrum, his ministers, publishers, police chiefs, and PASOK's governmental spokesman.
- Judicial independence was damaged when Papandreou passed a law via emergency procedures despite opposition from lawyers, judges, and clerks, to prevent the judicial investigation of the Koskotas scandal from advancing to the Athens Appeals Court.

=== Catharsis ===
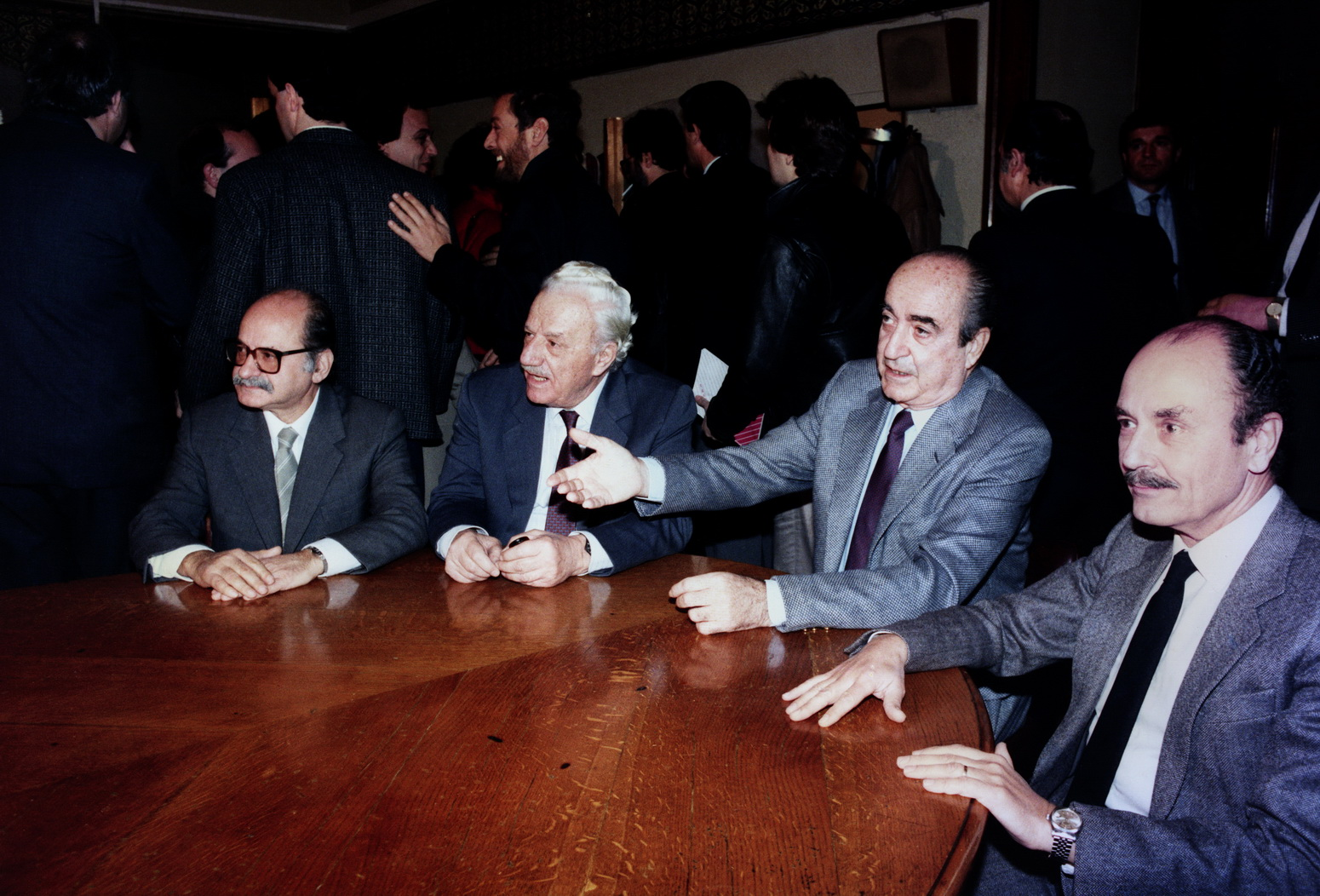
Two Greek communists and two conservative politicians (L-R: Leonidas Kyrkos, Charilaos Florakis, Konstantinos Mitsotakis, Konstantinos Stephanopoulos) discuss a time after the Papandreou indictment for the Koskotas scandal. Papandreou called them the "gang of four".

Papandreou lost the June 1989 election, mainly due to the Koskotas scandal. Mitsotakis' party won 43% of the vote, but it was insufficient to form a government because Papandreou's last-minute change of the electoral law required a party to win 50% of the vote to govern alone. Papandreou hoped that while PASOK might come second in voting, it could form a government with the support of the other leftist parties, but he was rejected. Instead, the right-wing New Democracy collaborated with the united leftist parties under Synaspismos, led by Charilaos Florakis, to form a government. Although they belonged to opposite ideological camps and had fought one another in the Civil War, both parties sought a "catharsis": an investigation into PASOK's corruption and a trial. The new government indicted Papandreou and four of his ministers. To avoid political exploitation by any future omnipotent prime minister, the new government dismantled some of the junta's surveillance infrastructure and, as a counterbalance to state media, granted the first private television broadcast license to publishers critical of PASOK.

In the election of April 1990, Mitsotakis received sufficient support to form a government, and Papandreou became the leader of the opposition, marking the end of PASOK's political dominance in its first era.

== Constitutional crisis evaluation and political consensus ==
=== Comparison to previous constitutional crises ===
In 1989, contemporary constitutional scholar Aristovoulos Manesis provided a detailed assessment of the constitutional crisis and made an extensive comparison with previous constitutional crises. While the 1985 constitutional revision was not the result of a violent confrontation, nor did it lead to one, as happened in the revisions of 1911 with the Goudi coup, in 1952 after the Civil War, and in 1975 after the military coup, all of these constitutional revisions were imposed by the governing political party without the participation or consent of the minority parties. Manesis also made the following distinctions in this comparison. While all political parties were invited and participated in the creation of the Constitution of 1975, in the end, due to the disagreement on the extent of presidential powers, the minority political parties (PASOK and the communist parties) did not vote, leaving Karamanlis, as he said, "debating with absentees." In this narrow sense, Manesis argued, the Constitution of 1975 was imposed by a single political party but asserts that Karamanlis had a sufficiently strong mandate. The constitutional revision in 1985, apart from dubious constitutional procedures in the presidential election that were necessary for the revision to take place, also features characteristics of single-party imposition since the objections of the minority, this time Karamanlis' former party (New Democracy), were sidelined.

=== Constitution legitimacy and populist democracy ===
Manesis considered the manner in which the presidential election was announced and conducted, and the nature of the constitutional amendments, had the potential of political rupture, while the latter also decreased the Constitution's democratic character due to the concentration of power in the prime minister's position, along with the emerging statist bureaucracies and technologies aimed at controlling the popular will. At the end of his criticism, Manesis advocated for strengthening individual rights and institutions as a counter to the executive branch led by the prime minister.

Nikos Alivizatos, a constitutional scholar, considered the methods PASOK used to elect Sartzetakis in 1985 unacceptable; he did not blame the change in the presidency in 1985 for the "corruption and moral crisis" that became apparent in the following years, and said the removal of constitutional restraints caused PASOK "to neglect the rules of the parliamentary game", and that PASOK "would not hesitate to overcome any obstacle in its aim to retain power". The political scientist Stathis Kalyvas and the historian Richard Clogg note that Papandreou's actions did not directly threaten the democratic form of the constitution, but they undermined its long-term legitimacy. The political scientist Dimitrios Katsoudas wrote that the constitutional revision was unnecessary and damaged the constitution's established legality, and said Papandreou had long-term constitutional designs to reinforce his government party against an impotent parliament.

Takis Pappas, a political scientist, stated PASOK's general strategy in the 1980s involved state grabbing, institution bending, and political polarization. According to Pappas, the constitutional reform was state grabbing, while the presidential election was bending or disregarding liberal institutions to the will of popular sovereignty that gradually changed Greece from a liberal democracy based on the Constitution of 1975 into a "populist democracy". Political polarization became most prominent during elections through political mobilization, which was aided by the press, and state-controlled television and radio, creating divisions in society.

=== Proposed constitutional reforms ===
As a result of the 1985 crisis, Greek constitutional reformers commonly include in their proposals the return of some prerogatives to the president to reduce the negative effects of majoritarian politics, i.e., "winner takes all", while avoiding conflicts between the president and prime minister in the executive branch. In a collaboration headed by former Finance Minister Stefanos Manos involving Alivizatos and others, it was proposed the president would have the right to dissolve Parliament to counterbalance the omnipotent prime minister. Under this plan, the president's term would be six years long and non-renewable.

=== Political norms ===
The 1985 crisis became a reference point regarding the process of choosing a presidential candidate. In the 1990 Greek presidential election, Parliament (with only New Democracy votes) elected Karamanlis to a second term as president after five rounds of voting. PASOK and Synaspismos supported their candidates. Following this, a political consensus that the governing party should choose a presidential candidate who is acceptable to the opposition (i.e., is not a party pick) has been publicly speculated, especially following the election of Konstantinos Tasoulas in the 2025 presidential election. Tasoulas, who had been elected as President of the Hellenic Parliament in 2019, was deemed in 2025 undesirable by the opposition because of his alleged interference or inaction in the investigation into the wiretapping scandal, the Pylos migrant boat disaster and the causes of the Tempi train crash. Kostas Tsoukalas, PASOK's press spokesperson invoked the norm, accusing the Prime Minister Kyriakos Mitsotakis of acting "in a one-party manner" and "breaking with political traditions". Adonis Georgiadis, speaking on government's behalf, rejected the existence of such a norm.

Overall, presidents have consistently been elected either with the backing of the governing coalition or through broad agreement between the country's two principal parties. This consensual, cartel-like approach to presidential selection is considered a stabilizing aspect of Greece's party system.

== Notes ==
1. The integration of the liberated Greek people into the newly formed state was slow, leaving parts of rural Greece outside state control. Of particular concern was the activity of irregular troops, some of whom acted as bandits, e.g., livestock rustling, robbery, and kidnapping of foreigners for ransom; the most notable incident was the Dilessi murders of 1870, which inspired the 1980 movie Alexander the Great by Theo Angelopoulos.
2. The first royal family was King Otto from Bavaria. However, he was deposed in 1862, and the Great Powers replaced him with George I from Denmark.
3. Scholars are cautious in taking sides regarding the constitutionality of the king's actions. Of those who take a side, there are two schools of thought: the strict and legal interpretation of the Constitution (the letter of the law) and the emphasis on the constitutional conventions and principles (the spirit of the law). In the former school of thought, the king acted within his constitutional rights, while in the latter, the king's actions violated the Constitution of 1952.
4. Andreas Papandreou admits that his father, on the night of the Colonels' coup, blamed Andreas for the coup, and Andreas himself wondered whether he had crossed the line with his radical campaign.
5. There is a long-standing debate on whether the Johnson administration gave the green light for the 1967 coup in Greece. Andreas Papandreou and his academic colleagues frequently accused the US administration of being responsible for the coup, and since then, Andreas Papandreou and other Greek elites have sold this to the masses as part of nurturing anti-American sentiment, making it a widespread belief among Greeks. Others are more skeptical due to the lack of smoking gun evidence. Louis Klarevas, based on the declassified documents of the US government and an extensive literature review, concluded that there was no official action for the coup; however, additional evidence is required to determine any unofficial activities.
6. The referendum of December 1974 was the sixth one on the issue of the Crown in the twentieth century (1920, 1924, 1935, 1946, and 1973).
7. The legitimation of the communist party had far-reaching implications. In the following years, a whole range of institutions that were founded for the persecution of Communists that had existed since the 1920s disappeared. Police, along with vigilante groups and spies whom they had employed, could no longer threaten everyone's civil rights or stigmatize them on ideological grounds.
8. For example, it was challenging to get a civil-service job as a communist.
9. According to constitutional scholar Aristovoulos Manesis, the constitutional principle of the secret ballot was violated in three different ways: by PASOK's use of colored ballots, by the opposition refusing to vote but being present, and by the last ballot of Alevras.
10. While Andreas Papandreou and Konstantinos Mitsotakis started from the same political party, and both competed for the leadership of the Center Union, Andreas had vilified Mitsotakis for Iouliana of 1965 (siding with the king and in the view of Andreas betraying his father) as a "traitor" and a "nightmare" effectively stigmatizing the life-long career of Mitsotakis in Greek politics. In 1984, Mitsotakis became leader of New Democracy because he was the only active politician (Karamanlis was President at the time) who could rival Andreas Papandreou. From 1984 until 1990, the political conflict between Papandreou and Mitsotakis was both personal and polarized. After winning the elections of 1990, Mitsotakis lacked the political capital and sufficient majority to implement his policies, despite his long-term ministerial experience, resulting in Mitsotakis's tenure being short.
11. "[...] κατάργηση στη συγκεκριμένη περίπτωση του Εκλογικού Σώματος ως οργάνου εξουσίας και κατάλυση στην πράξη της αρχής της λαϊκής κυριαρχίας."
12. "[...] ανεξάρτητα του ζητήματος της θεμελίωσης της νομιμοποιήσεως της εξουσίας του Προέδρου της Δημοκρατίας στη κανονιστική δύναμη των πραγμάτων που ρύθμισαν οι εκλογές και της αναγνωρίσεως του αποτελέσματος της ρυθμίσεως".
13. The opening to radical and anti-Western elements within the Arab world was controversial because it entailed the danger of alienating Western allies, which Greece could not afford to lose after the Turkish invasion of Cyprus.
14. It is frequent in Greek history for the governing party to change the electoral law for its purposes. Papandreou's electoral law change in 1989 was unique as it personally benefited him (whether intentionally or not) to avoid an indictment for the Koskotas scandal and be sentenced to life in prison if convicted.
15. Minas Samatas also highlighted PASOK's use of the junta's military surveillance for political gains. This was accompanied by populist rhetoric and patronage networks aimed at mobilizing and controlling the masses, ultimately safeguarding Andreas Papandreou's position both within the party and as prime minister.

== Sources ==
Constitutions of Greece

- "Greek Constitution of 1952". Government Gazette (Greece) ΦΕΚ A 1/1952 (in Greek). National Printing Office.
- "Greek Constitution of 1975". Government Gazette (Greece) ΦΕΚ A 111/1975 (in Greek). National Printing Office.
- "Greek Constitution of 1986". Government Gazette (Greece) ΦΕΚ A 23/1986 (in Greek). National Printing Office.

Proposed Constitutions for Greece

- Alivizatos, Nicos C.; Vourloumis, Panagis; Gerapetritis, Georgios; Ktistakis, Yannis [in German]; Manos, Stefanos; Spyropoulos, Philippos (2016). Ένα Καινούργιο Σύνταγμα για την Ελλάδα: Κείμενα Εργασείας [An Innovative Constitution for Greece: Working Papers] (PDF). Athens: Μεταίχνιο.

Court rulings

- 2862/1985 Plenary decision (Council of State 1985).
- 84464/1985 Αρχείον Νομολογίας (Magistrate's Court (Μονομελούς Πλημμελειοδικείου Αθηνών) 1985).

Books

- Alivizatos, Nikos (2011). Το Σύνταγμα και οι εχθροί του στη νεοελληνική ιστορία 1800-2010 (in Greek). Athens: ΠΟΛΙΣ. ISBN 9789604353064.
- Manesis, Aristovoulos (1989). Η συνταγματική αναθεώρηση του 1986 [Constitutional resivion of 1986] (in Greek). Athens: Παρατηρητής. ISBN 9789602603543.
- Anastasiadis, George (1981). Ο διορισμός και η παύση των κυβερνήσεων στην Ελλάδα: από την "αρχή της δεδηλωμένης" στο Σύνταγμα του 1975 [The appointment and dismissal of governments in Greece: From the 'principle of declared confidence' to the 1975 Constitution] (in Greek). Athens: University Studio Press. ISBN 9780001208902.
- Carabott, Philip; Sfikas, Thanassis D., eds. (2004). The Greek Civil War: essays on a conflict of exceptionalism and silences. Surrey: Ashgate. ISBN 9780754641322.
  - Close, David. "The road to reconciliation". In Carabott & Sfikas (2004), pp. 257–278.
- Chilcote, Ronald H.; Hadjiyannis, Stylianos; Lopez, Fred A. III; et al. (2015). Transitions from Dictatorship to Democracy, Comparative Studies of Spain, Portugal, and Greece. New York: Taylor & Francis. ISBN 978-1-317-84104-3.
- Clogg, Richard (1987). Parties and elections in Greece: the search for legitimacy. North Carolina: Duke University Press. ISBN 0822307944.
- Clogg, Richard, ed. (1993). Greece, 1981–89: The Populist Decade. London & New York: Palgrave Macmillan. ISBN 9781349230563.
  - Alivizatos, Nikos C. "The Presidency, Parliament and the Courts in the 1980s". In Clogg (1993), pp. 65–77.
- Clogg, Richard (2013). A Concise History of Greece. Cambridge: Cambridge University Press. ISBN 9781107656444.
- Close, David H. (2014). Greece since 1945: Politics, Economy and Society. London & New York: Taylor & Francis. ISBN 9781317880011.
- Curtis, Glenn E. (1995). Greece, A Country Study. Maryland: Library of Congress. ISBN 1490436235.
- Dervitsiotis, Alkis (2019). Η έννοια της Κυβέρνησης (in Greek). Athens: P.N. Sakkoulas SA. ISBN 9789604208005.
- Featherstone, Kevin; Katsoudas, Dimitrios K., eds. (1987). Political change in Greece: Before and after the colonels. London & New York: Taylor & Francis. ISBN 9781000992144.
  - Katsoudas, Dimitrios K. "The Constitutional framework". In Featherstone & Katsoudas (1987), pp. 14–33.
- Featherstone, Kevin; Papadimitriou, Dimitris (2015). Prime Ministers in Greece, The Paradox of Power. Oxford: Oxford University Press. ISBN 9780198717171.
- Featherstone, Kevin; Sotiropoulos, Dimitri A., eds. (2020). The Oxford Handbook of Modern Greek Politics. Oxford: Oxford University Press. ISBN 978-0198825104.
  - Alivizatos, Nikos C. "Greek constitutionalism and patterns of government". In Featherstone & Sotiropoulos (2020), pp. 103–116.
- Gallant, Thomas W. (2016). Modern Greece: From the war of independence to the present. London: Bloomsbury Publishing. ISBN 9781350014510.
- Garrard, James; Newell, John, eds. (2006). Scandals in past and contemporary politics. Manchester: Manchester University Press. ISBN 9780719065514.
  - Koutsoukis, Kleomenis S. "Political scandals and crisis management in Greece, 1821-2001". In Garrard & Newell (2006), pp. 123–136.
- Grigoriadis, Ioannis N., ed. (2017). Democratic transition and the rise of Populist Majoritarianism: Constitutional Reform in Greece and Turkey. Cham: Palgrave Macmillan. ISBN 9783319575551.
  - Grigoriadis, Ioannis N. "The Rising Tide of Populist Majoritarianism in Greece". In Grigoriadis (2017), pp. 41–52.
- Gunther, Richard; Diamandouros, Nikiforos; Sotiropoulos, Dimitri, eds. (2006). Democracy and the state in the new southern Europe. Oxford: Oxford University Press. ISBN 9780191513961.
  - Magalhaes, Pedro C.; Guarnieri, Carlo; Kaminis, Yorgos. "Democratic consolidation, judicial reform, and the judicialization of politics in Southern Europe". In Gunther, Diamandouros & Sotiropoulos (2006), pp. 138–196.
- Hatzivassiliou, Evanthis [in Greek] (2006). Greece and the Cold War Front Line State, 1952-1967. London & New York: Taylor & Francis. ISBN 9781134154883.
- Koliopoulos, John S.; Veremis, Thanos M. [in Greek] (2009). Modern Greece A History Since 1821. Oxford: Wiley-Blackwell. ISBN 9781444314830.
- Kofas, Jon V. (2005). Independence from America: global integration and inequality. Burlington: Ashgate. ISBN 9780754645085.
- Lagos, Katerina; Othon, Anastasakis, eds. (2021). The Greek Military Dictatorship Revisiting a Troubled Past, 1967-1974. New York & London: Berghahn Books. ISBN 9781800731752.
  - Lagos, Katerina. "The political and ideological origins of the Ethosotitios Epanastasis". In Lagos & Othon (2021), pp. 34–72.
- Liakos, Antonis [in Greek]; Doumanis, Nicholas (2023). The Edinburgh History of the Greeks, 20th and Early 21st Centuries: Global Perspectives. Edinburgh: Edinburgh University Press. ISBN 978-1474410847.
- Magone, José (2003). The Politics of Southern Europe Integration Into the European Union. Santa Barbara: ABC-CLIO. ISBN 9780313051678.
- Miller, James (2009). The United States and the Making of Modern Greece. Chapel Hill: The University of North Carolina Press. ISBN 978-1469622163.
- Mouzelis, Nicos P. (1978). Modern Greece: facets of underdevelopment. London: The Macmillan Press Ltd. ISBN 978-0333226155.
- Pantelis, Antonis (2007). Εγχειρίδιο Συνταγματικού Δικαίου [Constitutional Law handbook] (PDF) (in Greek). Livanis Publications.
- Papandreou, Andreas (1971). Democracy at Gunpoint. New York: Deutsch. ISBN 9780233963013.
- Pappas, Takis S. (2009). Το χαρισματικό κόμμα: ΠΑΣΟΚ, Παπανδρέου, Εξουσία (in Greek). Athens: Patakis. ISBN 978-960-16-3256-8.
- Pappas, Takis (2014). Populism and crisis politics in Greece (in Greek). New York: Palgrave Macmillan. ISBN 9781137410580.
- Pappas, Takis S. (2019). Populism and liberal democracy: A comparative and theoretical analysis. Oxford: Oxford University Press. ISBN 9780192574893.
- Papastylianos, Christos (2023), Σύνταγμα, Ερμηνεία κατ' άρθρο, Άρθρο 120 [Constitution, Interpretation per Article, Article 120] (in Greek)
- Pridham, Geoffrey, ed. (1990). Securing Democracy, Political Parties and Democratic Consolidation in Southern Europe. London & New York: Routledge. ISBN 9780415023269.
  - Featherstone, Kevin. "Political Parties and democratic consolidation in Greece". In Pridham (1990), pp. 179–202.
- Siani-Davies, Peter (2017). Crisis in Greece. Oxford: Oxford University Press. ISBN 9780190911539.
- Spyropoulos, Philippos C.; Fortsakis, Theodore P. (2017). Constitutional Law in Greece. Netherlands: Wolters Kluwer. ISBN 9789041192448.
- Stergiou, Andreas (2021). Greece's Ostpolitik Dealing With the 'Devil'. Cham: Springer International Publishing. ISBN 9783030611293.

Journals

- Bértoa, F.C; Weber, T. (2024). "Presidential elections and European party systems (1848–2020)". British Journal of Political Science. 54 (3): 874–891. doi:10.1017/S0007123423000704.
- Clive, Nigel (1985). "The 1985 Greek Election and its Background". Government and Opposition. 20 (4): 488–503. doi:10.1111/j.1477-7053.1985.tb01100.x. JSTOR 44483257.
- Clive, Nigel (1990). "The Dilemmas of Democracy in Greece". Government and Opposition. 25 (1): 115–122. doi:10.1111/j.1477-7053.1990.tb00750.x. JSTOR 44482490.
- Clogg, Richard (1975). "Karamanlis's cautious success: the background". Government and Opposition. 10 (3): 332–255. doi:10.1111/j.1477-7053.1975.tb00644.x. JSTOR 44483305.
- Clogg, Richard (1985). "The 1985 Constitutional Crisis in Greece". The Journal of Modern Hellenism. 2 (1): 103–112.
- Clogg, Richard (1996). "Andreas Papandreou – A political profile". Mediterranean Politics. 1 (3): 382–387. doi:10.1080/13629399608414596.
- Dimitras, Panayote E. (1989). "Greece". Electoral Studies. 8 (3): 270–280. doi:10.1080/01402389008424782.
- Dobratz, Betty A.; Whitfield, Stefanie (1992). "Does Scandal Influence Voters' Party Preference? The Case of Greece during the Papandreou Era". European Sociological Review. 8 (2): 167–180. doi:10.1093/oxfordjournals.esr.a036630. JSTOR 522295.
- Featherstone, Kevin (1990b). "The 'party-state' in Greece and the fall of Papandreou". West European Politics. 13 (1): 101–115. doi:10.1080/01402389008424782.
- Fytili, Magdalini; Avgeridis, Manos; Kouki, Eleni (2023). "Heroes or Outcasts? The Long Saga of the State's Recognition of the Greek Resistance (1944–2006)". Contemporary European History. 33 (4): 1365–1383. doi:10.1017/S0960777323000395.
- Grigoriadis, Ioannis N.; Tsourapas, Gerasimos (2024). "Understanding Greece's new foreign policy towards the Arab world: Instrumentalisation, balancing, and emerging opportunities". Mediterranean Politics. 29 (3): 307–330. doi:10.1080/13629395.2022.2148193.
- Kallivretakis, Leonidas (2018). "The King, the Junta and the "Impartial Broker": A microscopic approach to the Johnson-Constantine meeting on 11 September 1967". The Historical Review/La Revue Historique. 14: 211–240. doi:10.12681/hr.16301.
- Kaloudis, George (2000). "Transitional democratic politics in Greece". International Journal on World Peace. 17 (1): 35–39. JSTOR 20753241.
- Kalyvas, Stathis N. (1997). "Polarization in Greek Politics: PASOK's First Four Years, 1981-1985". Journal of the Hellenic Diaspora. 23 (1): 83–104.
- Klarevas, Louis (2006). "Were the eagle and the phoenix birds of a feather? The United States and the Greek coup of 1967". Diplomatic History. 30 (3): 471–508. doi:10.1111/j.1467-7709.2006.00562.x. JSTOR 24915022.
- Karamouzi, Eirini (2015). "A strategy for Greece: Democratization and European integration, 1974-1975". Cahiers de la Méditerranée. 90 (90): 11–24. doi:10.4000/cdlm.7858.
- Kassimeris, George (1993). "The Greek state response to terrorism". Terrorism and Political Violence. 5 (4): 288–310. doi:10.1080/09546559308427230.
- Larrabee, F. Stephen (1981). "Dateline Athens: Greece for the Greeks". Foreign Policy. 45 (45): 158–174. doi:10.2307/1148318. JSTOR 1148318.
- McDonald, Robert (1985). "Greece after PASOK's Victory". The World Today. 41 (7): 133–136. JSTOR 40395748.
- Michas, Takis (2002). "America the despised". The National Interest. 67 (67): 94–102. JSTOR 42897404.
- Nafpliotis, Alexandros (2018). "From radicalism to pragmatism via Europe: PASOK's stance vis-à-vis the EEC, 1977-1981". Southeast European and Black Sea Studies. 18 (4): 509–528. doi:10.1080/14683857.2018.1519686.
- Papathanassopoulos, Stylianos (1990). "Broadcasting, politics and the state in Socialist Greece". Media, Culture & Society. 12 (3): 387–397. doi:10.1177/016344390012003007.
- Pappas, Nicholas C. (2018). "Brigands and brigadiers: the problem of banditry and the military in nineteenth-century Greece". Journal of History. 4 (3): 179–183. doi:10.30958/AJHIS.4-3-2. S2CID 186900394.
- Samatas, Minas (1993). "The Populist Phase of an Underdeveloped Surveillance Society: Political Surveillance in Post-Dictatorial Greece". Journal of the Hellenic Diaspora. 19 (1): 31–70.
- Siani-Davies, Peter; Katsikas, Stefanos (2009). "National reconciliation after civil war: The case of Greece". Journal of Peace Research. 46 (4): 559–575. doi:10.1177/0022343309334611. JSTOR 25654436.
- Tsarouhas, Dimitris (2005). "Explaining an activist military: Greece until 1975" (PDF). Southeast European Politics. 6 (1): 1–13.

Newspapers and magazines

- Jonathan C. Randal (13 March 1985). "Greek Opposition Leader Gladdened by Papandreou's Shift". The Washington Post.
- Jonathan C. Randal (29 May 1985). "Leader of Greek Communist Party Assails Ruling Socialists, Opposition". The Washington Post.
- Marlise Simons (17 January 1992). "Greek Ex-Premier Not Guilty in Bank Scandal". The New York Times.
- Nellas, Demetris (29 May 2017). "Former Greek Prime Minister Constantine Mitsotakis dies". Kathimerini.
- "Πρόεδρος της Βουλής με 283 ψήφους ο Κώστας Τασούλας". Η Ναυτεμπορική (in Greek). 18 July 2019.
- "Μητσοτάκης: Μία εξαετή θητεία για τον Πρόεδρο της Δημοκρατίας – Η πρόταση ενόψει συνταγματικής αναθεώρησης". in.gr (in Greek). 15 January 2025.
- "Κ. Τσουκαλάς: Το ΠΑΣΟΚ θα προτείνει δικό του πρόσωπο για την Προεδρία της Δημοκρατίας" (in Greek). Capital. 15 January 2025.
- "Αδ. Γεωργιάδης για ΠτΔ: Όταν ο Ανδρέας Παπανδρέου πρότεινε τον Χρήστο Σαρτζετάκη, ήταν από άλλη παράταξη;". Νaftemporiki (in Greek). 16 January 2025.
- Μιχάλης Στούκας (19 January 2025). "Από τον Μιχαήλ Στασινόπουλο στον Κωνσταντίνο Τασούλα - Όλοι οι ένοικοι του Προεδρικού Μεγάρου". Proto Thema (in Greek).
- "Κωνσταντίνος Τασούλας / Ο ρόλος του στη συγκάλυψη του σκανδάλου υποκλοπών και της τραγωδίας των Τεμπών" (in Greek). Η Αυγή. 16 January 2025.
- "Οι αντιδράσεις των κομμάτων της αντιπολίτευσης για την εκλογή του Κ. Τασούλα στο αξίωμα του Προέδρου της Δημοκρατίας". ertnews.gr (in Greek). ERT. 12 February 2025.

Web and other sources

- "Greece's unemployment (%)". International Monetary Fund.
- "Greece's inflation rate (%)". International Monetary Fund.
