= 1985 Greek presidential election =

- 17, 23, 29 March 1985
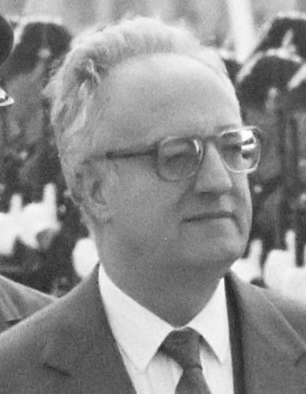
Nominee	Christos Sartzetakis
Party	Independent
Round 1	179 (needed 200)
Round 2	181 (needed 200)
Round 3	180+1 (needed 180)
President before election
Konstantinos Karamanlis
ND
President after election
Christos Sartzetakis
Independent

The 1985 Greek presidential election was an indirect election for the position of President of the Hellenic Republic and was held by the Hellenic Parliament in March 1985. The election became central stage of the first constitutional crisis of the Third Hellenic Republic triggered by the Prime Minister Andreas Papandreou, who suddenly declared not to support Konstantinos Karamanlis for a second term as President of the Republic.

Papandreou instead chose to back Christos Sartzetakis, a Supreme Court of Greece judge popular to Left voters. Papandreou's choice was controversial because it was accompanied by proposals for constitutional reforms designed to further increase the power of his position by reducing the presidential powers, which were acting as checks and balances against the powerful executive branch led by the prime minister. The election was conducted under a tense and confrontational atmosphere due to Papandreou's constitutionally dubious tactics. The opposition, New Democracy, led by Konstantinos Mitsotakis and Karamanlis' former party, deemed the vote illegal, with Mitsotakis threatening to remove Sartzetakis from the presidency if they won the upcoming parliamentary elections, thereby intensifying the constitutional crisis.

The confrontation dominated and polarized the upcoming parliamentary election campaigns. However, Sartzetakis' election helped Papandreou and his socialist party (PASOK) to secure the June election despite Papandreou's failure to address Greece's worsening economy. After the election, all political parties accepted Sartzetakis as president, ending the constitutional crisis, despite a later court ruling that declared Sartzetakis's election unconstitutional. The constitutional amendments took effect in 1986.

== Background ==
After coming to power in 1981, Papandreou began implementing an ambitious social, economic, and foreign agenda. Despite many achievements in updating the Greek laws, especially on the social issues, he failed to address the mounting structural problems of the Greek economy with trade deficits widening, unemployment increasing from 2.7% in 1980 to 7.8% in 1985, and annual inflation reaching 20%. Public perception of Greece's economy worsened sharply during this period. (Note: According to a public opinion survey by Eurobarometer, Greeks who believed that the economy worsened than before increased from 37.7% in 1983 to 70.2% in 1985, while those who believed that the economy improved fell from 31.5% to 12.8% in the same period.)

On 6 March 1985, New Democracy announced that it would support Konstantinos Karamanlis's second term as President, and the communist party (KKE) declared that it would put forward its own candidate. The press anticipated that Papandreou would also support Karamanlis, having previously assured Karamanlis his support in person. However, Papandreou changed his mind at the last moment, siding with the left wing of PASOK, which did not want Karamanlis, and instead backed Christos Sartzetakis, who was a Supreme Court judge known for his principled handling of the 1963 murder of left-wing deputy Grigoris Lambrakis and viewed favorably by the Left. Sartzetakis's investigation became the main plot in Costas Gavras's 1969 movie Z based on the novel of Vassilis Vassilikos.

Papandreou announced this at the PASOK Central Committee on 9 March, surprising some of his ministers, much of his party's rank-and-file, and even Sartzetakis himself, who had not been told in advance. Later on, it was revealed that the supposedly spontaneous change of mind was to camouflage Papandreou's long-held constitutional designs since Sartzetakis not only knew about it well in advance but also that there had been two other judicial figures who rejected Papandreou's offer. At the same time, Papandreou announced plans for a constitutional reform, which rekindled the debate about the form of the republic and further polarized the political environment by damaging the consensus between the period's two dominant political parties, PASOK and New Democracy.

Scholars considered the proposal unnecessary and autocratic, reflecting the weakness of the Greek political system. Foreign observers were also worried that Papandreou unleashed a high-stakes gamble over the president question with potentially dire consequences for Greece and its allies. An electoral weakened Papandreou might lead to a collaboration with the communist party to form a government, in which communists shaping Greece's foreign policy and disrupting the communications in North Atlantic Treaty Organization influence the balance of power in the Mediterranean.

Papandreou argued that it would be illogical for Karamanlis, who had influenced much of the Constitution of 1975, to preside over any constitutional reform, and informed him of this via his deputy, Antonios Livanis. In response, Karamanlis resigned from the Presidency on 10 March 1985, two weeks before the termination of his term, and the Speaker of the Hellenic Parliament, Ioannis Alevras of PASOK, filling in as acting president. Mitsotakis accused Papandreou of creating a constitutional crisis to remove Karamanlis from office to establish a totalitarian constitution.

== Parliamentary votes for president ==
Sartzetakis was the sole candidate since the political opposition from New Democracy, led by Mitsotakis, abstained. According to the Constitution of 1975, up to three rounds of a parliamentary vote were permitted for presidential candidates; the first two rounds required more than 200 votes out of 300 members of parliament, and the third, 180 votes out of 300. If all three rounds failed, then new elections would be held. Having expelled six PASOK MPs for criticizing him, he could only rely on 164 of his own MPs, 12 MPs from KKE, and five independent MPs (about 181). The opposition raised the issue of whether Alevras should be precluded from the presidential vote and his deputy's rights while acting president, as Article 30 of the Constitution of 1975 stated that the president's office was incompatible with other offices. On the advice of Grigorios Kasimatis, PASOK argued that there was no explicit provision in the constitution and put it to the PASOK-controlled Parliament, which allowed it. PASOK deputy Agamemnon Koutsogiorgas later argued in Parliament that the issue raised by constitutional scholars on Alevras' ineligibility to vote due to Article 30 in the Constitution applied only to elected presidents and would not have applied to Alevras.

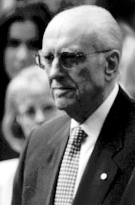
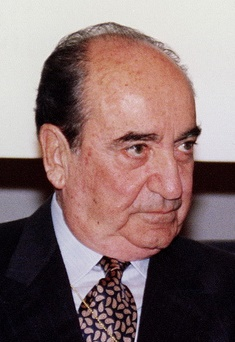
Portraits of (left) Andreas Papandreou and (right) Konstantinos Mitsotakis, who had an oral confrontation in the Parliament regarding the constitutional violations by Papandreou.

The first two rounds, held on 17 and 23 March, failed to elect Sartzetakis. The elections were held amid high political tension; at one point, a New Democracy deputy briefly grabbed the ballot box. The third round took place on 29 March amid chanting PASOK supporters surrounding the building. Like in previous rounds, colored ballots (in blue color for Sartzetakis) and semi-transparent envelopes were used, which led New Democracy chairman Mitsotakis to accuse Papandreou of violating the constitutional principle of secret ballot (Article 32). His concern was dismissed because PASOK controlled the majority in the Parliament, prompting Mitsotakis to confront Papandreou. Mitsotakis claimed Papandreou had no respect for the Parliament, and Papandreou responded, with Mitsotakis' role in the Iouliana of 1965 in mind, that the latter was the last person entitled to speak about respect. Despite vigorous protests from the opposition, PASOK members used colored ballots under strict surveillance to spot potential defectors.

In the third round of voting on 29 March, Papandreou's party lost the support of two MPs, who Papandreou accused of taking bribes from Mitsotakis' party. Sartzetakis received 180 votes, which was the minimum stipulated by the constitution, and Alevras, as Speaker of the Parliament, cast the decisive vote. Mitsotakis denounced the vote as illegal, vowing that he would bring the legality of the process to the Council of State if New Democracy won the upcoming election. With Sartzetakis as president, Papandreou formally submitted the proposals for constitutional amendments by adding to the previous one the removal of a secret ballot for president.

Candidate	Party	17 March		23 March		29 March	
Candidate	Party	Votes	%	Votes	%	Votes	%
Christos Sartzetakis	Independent	179	61.51	181	62.20	180	61.64
Present but not voted		112	38.49	110	37.80	112	38.36
Total		291	100.00	291	100.00	292	100.00
Valid votes		291	97.98	291	98.64	292	97.99
Invalid/blank votes		6	2.02	4	1.36	6	2.01
Total votes		297	100.00	295	100.00	298	100.00
Registered voters/turnout		300	99.00	300	98.33	300	99.33
Source: Richard Clogg

== Aftermath ==
=== Election campaign of 1985 ===
The logo of PASOK in the elections of 1981

Both parties continued their confrontations during the campaign for the June election, where political polarization reached new heights. Mitsotakis declared, "In voting, the Greek people will also be voting for a president" and also warned that there is a danger of sliding towards an authoritarian one-party state. Papandreou invoked the association of the opposition with the oppressive conservative governments with the slogan "Vote PASOK to prevent a return of the right." The communists, persecuted by the Right in the 1950s, protested against Papandreou's dwelling on the past, pointing out that the 1980s were not the same as the 1950s. The Economist magazine described Greece as a "country divided," tearing itself apart and opening the wounds of Greek Civil War.

In the event, PASOK was re-elected with 45.82% of the vote, losing approximately 2.3% from 1981, while New Democracy increased its share of the vote by 4.98% to 40.84%. Papandreou's gamble worked to his benefit because he gained from far-left voting blocks covering the losses from the centrist voters, and appealed to socialist voters who rejected Karamanlis's perceived hindrance of PASOK's policies.

=== Fallout ===
After the election results, Mitsotakis accepted Sartzetakis as president and the head of state. Despite the political legitimacy of the president, the case also reached the courts. The plenary session of the Council of State ruled that the direct judicial review of the election of the President was inadmissible, however, the Athens One-member Magistrates' Court ruled in passing that the election of the President was "irregular" and "amounted to an abrogation of popular sovereignty". (Note: "[...] κατάργηση στη συγκεκριμένη περίπτωση του Εκλογικού Σώματος ως οργάνου εξουσίας και κατάλυση στην πράξη της αρχής της λαϊκής κυριαρχίας.") The court also considered that the subsequent political legitimacy (following the victory of PASOK in the 1985 election) did not negate the unconstitutionality of the act. (Note: "[...] ανεξάρτητα του ζητήματος της θεμελίωσης της νομιμοποιήσεως της εξουσίας του Προέδρου της Δημοκρατίας στη κανονιστική δύναμη των πραγμάτων που ρύθμισαν οι εκλογές και της αναγνωρίσεως του αποτελέσματος της ρυθμίσεως".) The latter ruling is considered by constitutional scholar Christos Papastylianos as an example of the courts being able to deem an action as unconstitutional but unable to prevent it. Papandreou's constitutional proposals took effect in 1986.

== Scholarly assessment ==
Nikos Alivizatos, a constitutional scholar, considered the methods employed by PASOK to elect Sartzetakis in 1985 "unacceptable," and arguing that although blame the change in the presidency in 1985 did not cause the "corruption and moral crisis" that became apparent in the following years, the ousting of Karamanlis caused PASOK "to neglect the rules of the parliamentary game" and signaled that it "would not hesitate to overcome any obstacle in its aim to retain power." In similar lines, Richard Clogg and political scientist Stathis Kalyvas noted that while the actions by Papandreou did not directly threaten the democratic form of the Constitution but undermined its long-term legitimacy. Takis Pappas, a political scientist, considered the events surrounding Sartzetakis's election as part of PASOK's strategy in the 1980s to bend or even disregard liberal institutions to the will of popular sovereignty that transformed Greece from a liberal democracy based on the Constitution of 1975 into a "populist democracy."

While Papandreou contended that Karamanlis' removal was necessary for the constitutional revision, contemporary constitutional scholar Aristovoulos Manesis argued the reverse that the constitutional revision was merely a pretext to justify the removal of Karamanlis, which would remind left-leaning voters, as the elections were approaching, that PASOK remained faithful to its revolutionary left-wing origins. Kevin Featherstone argued that Papandreou instigated a constitutional crisis, centered on the presidential election, just before the 1985 elections to divert the Greek electorate's attention away from the economic decline.

Historians John S. Koliopoulos and Thanos Veremis argued that Papandreou's removal previous constitutional guardrails did not benefited him in improving the economy. His government applied to the EEC for a $1.75 billion loan to deal with the widening foreign trade deficit (8.7% of GDP). Papandreou touted the loan as a life savior for the economy of Greece because if they had not, then the International Monetary Fund would have imposed more severe austerity measures. However, in 1987 Papandreou reversed course and Greek economy started to fall behind in terms of convergence with EEC goals and economic competitiveness.

Political scientist Stylianos Hadjiyannis argued that the concentration of power did not promote "democratic socialism" or ease the troubles of the Greeks, and instead became increasingly personalized around one person, Papandreou. As a result, supporters and opponents alike attributed to him responsibility for everything from economic crises and forest fires to international conflicts and even traffic jams. This public perception was amplified by the mounting corruption scandals, especially the Koskotas and Yugoslav corn affairs. The scandals drew common criticism from both the right and the left, culminating after the June 1989 elections in a coalition government tasked with investigating PASOK's corruption (known as "katharsis") and leading to Papandreou's indictment.

== Sources ==
Constitutions of Greece

- "Greek Constitution of 1975". Government Gazette (Greece) ΦΕΚ A 111/1975 (in Greek). National Printing Office.
- "Greek Constitution of 1986". Government Gazette (Greece) ΦΕΚ A 23/1986 (in Greek). National Printing Office.

Court decisions

- 2862/1985 Plenary decision (Council of State 1985).
- 84464/1985 Αρχείον Νομολογίας (Magistrate's Court (Μονομελούς Πλημμελειοδικείου Αθηνών) 1985).

Books

- Alivizatos, Nikos (2011). Το Σύνταγμα και οι εχθροί του στη νεοελληνική ιστορία 1800-2010 (in Greek). Athens: ΠΟΛΙΣ. ISBN 9789604353064.
- Carabott, Philip; Sfikas, Thanassis D., eds. (2004). The Greek Civil War: essays on a conflict of exceptionalism and silences. Surrey: Ashgate. ISBN 9780754641322.
  - Close, David. "The road to reconciliation". In Carabott & Sfikas (2004), pp. 257–278.
- Chilcote, Ronald H.; Hadjiyannis, Stylianos; Lopez, Fred A. III; et al. (2015). Transitions from Dictatorship to Democracy, Comparative Studies of Spain, Portugal, and Greece. New York: Taylor & Francis. ISBN 978-1-317-84104-3.
- Clogg, Richard (1987). Parties and elections in Greece: the search for legitimacy. North Carolina: Duke University Press. ISBN 0822307944.
- ——————, ed. (1993). Greece, 1981–89: The Populist Decade. London & New York: Palgrave Macmillan. ISBN 9781349230563.
  - Alivizatos, Nikos C. "The Presidency, Parliament and the Courts in the 1980s". In Clogg (1993), pp. 65–77.
- —————— (2013). A Concise History of Greece. Cambridge: Cambridge University Press. ISBN 9781107656444.
- Close, David H. (2014). Greece since 1945: Politics, Economy and Society. London & New York: Taylor & Francis. ISBN 978-1-317-88001-1.
- Featherstone, Kevin; Katsoudas, Dimitrios K., eds. (1987). Political change in Greece: Before and after the colonels. London & New York: Taylor & Francis. ISBN 9781000992144.
  - Katsoudas, Dimitrios K. "The Constitutional framework". In Featherstone & Katsoudas (1987), pp. 14–33.
- ——————; Papadimitriou, Dimitris (2015). Prime Ministers in Greece, The Paradox of Power. Oxford: Oxford University Press. ISBN 9780198717171.
- Featherstone, Kevin; Sotiropoulos, Dimitri A., eds. (2020). The Oxford Handbook of Modern Greek Politics. Oxford: Oxford University Press. ISBN 978-0198825104.
  - Alivizatos, Nikos C. "Greek constitutionalism and patterns of government". In Featherstone & Sotiropoulos (2020), pp. 103–116.
- Grigoriadis, Ioannis N., ed. (2017). Democratic transition and the rise of Populist Majoritarianism: Constitutional Reform in Greece and Turkey. Cham: Palgrave Macmillan. ISBN 9783319575551.
- Kalyvas, Stathis N. (1997). "Polarization in Greek Politics: PASOK's First Four Years, 1981-1985". Journal of the Hellenic Diaspora. 23 (1): 83–104.
- Koliopoulos, John S.; Veremis, Thanos M. [in Greek] (2009). Modern Greece A History Since 1821. Oxford: Wiley-Blackwell. ISBN 9781444314830.
- Liakos, Antonis [in Greek]; Doumanis, Nicholas (2023). The Edinburgh History of the Greeks, 20th and Early 21st Centuries: Global Perspectives. Edinburgh: Edinburgh University Press. ISBN 978-1-4744-1084-7.
- Manesis, Aristovoulos (1989). Η συνταγματική αναθεώρηση του 1986 [Constitutional resivion of 1986] (in Greek). Athens: Παρατηρητής. ISBN 9789602603543.
- Pantelis, Antonis (2007). Εγχειρίδιο Συνταγματικού Δικαίου [Constitutional Law handbook] (PDF) (in Greek). Livanis Publications.
- Pappas, Takis (2014). Populism and crisis politics in Greece (in Greek). New York: Palgrave Macmillan. ISBN 9781137410580.
- Papastylianos, Christos (2023), Σύνταγμα, Ερμηνεία κατ' άρθρο, Άρθρο 120 [Constitution, Interpretation per Article, Article 120] (in Greek)
- Pridham, Geoffrey, ed. (1990). Securing Democracy, Political Parties and Democratic Consolidation in Southern Europe. London & New York: Routledge. ISBN 9780415023269.
  - Featherstone, Kevin. "Political Parties and democratic consolidation in Greece". In Pridham (1990), pp. 179–202.
- Siani-Davies, Peter (2017). Crisis in Greece. Oxford: Oxford University Press. ISBN 9780190911539.

Journal

- Clogg, Richard (1985). "The 1985 Constitutional Crisis in Greece". The Journal of Modern Hellenism. 2 (1): 103–112.
- Featherstone, Kevin (1990b). "The 'party‐state' in Greece and the fall of Papandreou". West European Politics. 13 (1): 101–115. doi:10.1080/01402389008424782.
- Matsaganis, Manos (1999). "Welfare Policies in Greece since the early 1980s" (PDF). Oficina do CES. 149: 1–23.
- McDonald, Robert (1985). "Greece after PASOK's Victory". The World Today. 41 (7): 133–136. JSTOR 40395748.

Web sources

- "Greece's unemployment (%)". International Monetary Fund.
- "Greece's inflation rate (%)". International Monetary Fund.
- "Οι Πρόεδροι της Ελληνικής Δημοκρατίας". sansimera.gr. Archived from the original on 2025-02-20.
- Μιχάλης Στούκας (19 January 2025). "Από τον Μιχαήλ Στασινόπουλο στον Κωνσταντίνο Τασούλα - Όλοι οι ένοικοι του Προεδρικού Μεγάρου". Proto Thema (in Greek).
- Jonathan C. Randal (29 May 1985). "Leader of Greek Communist Party Assails Ruling Socialists, Opposition". The Washington Post.
