= Greek constitutional amendment of 1986 =

First constitutional reform of the Third Hellenic Republic

The amendment of 1986 was a proposed amendment to the Constitution of Greece to limit the powers of the president of the Republic. Eleven articles were amended, primarily targeting the responsibilities of the president of the Republic, transposing the text of the Constitution into demotic Greek, and the removal of the secret ballot for the presidential elections. These amendments transformed the liberal democracy of Greece—based on the constitution of 1975—into a populist democracy with a majoritarian parliamentary system and a prime minister acting as a "parliamentary autocrat."

The proposal was a political gamble by Prime Minister Andreas Papandreou, who suddenly withdrew his backing for President Konstantinos Karamanlis's second term and instead promoted his own choice, Christos Sartzetakis. At the same time, Papandreou announced a constitutional revision to remove the powers of the president that acted as checks and balances against an already dominant office of the prime minister.

Despite the political and constitutional crisis that emerged from the unconstitutional procedures in electing Sartzetakis, as later court rulings concluded, the revised Constitution of 1975/1986 was accepted by all political powers after the polarized 1985 Greek parliamentary election.

== Background ==
=== First stage ===
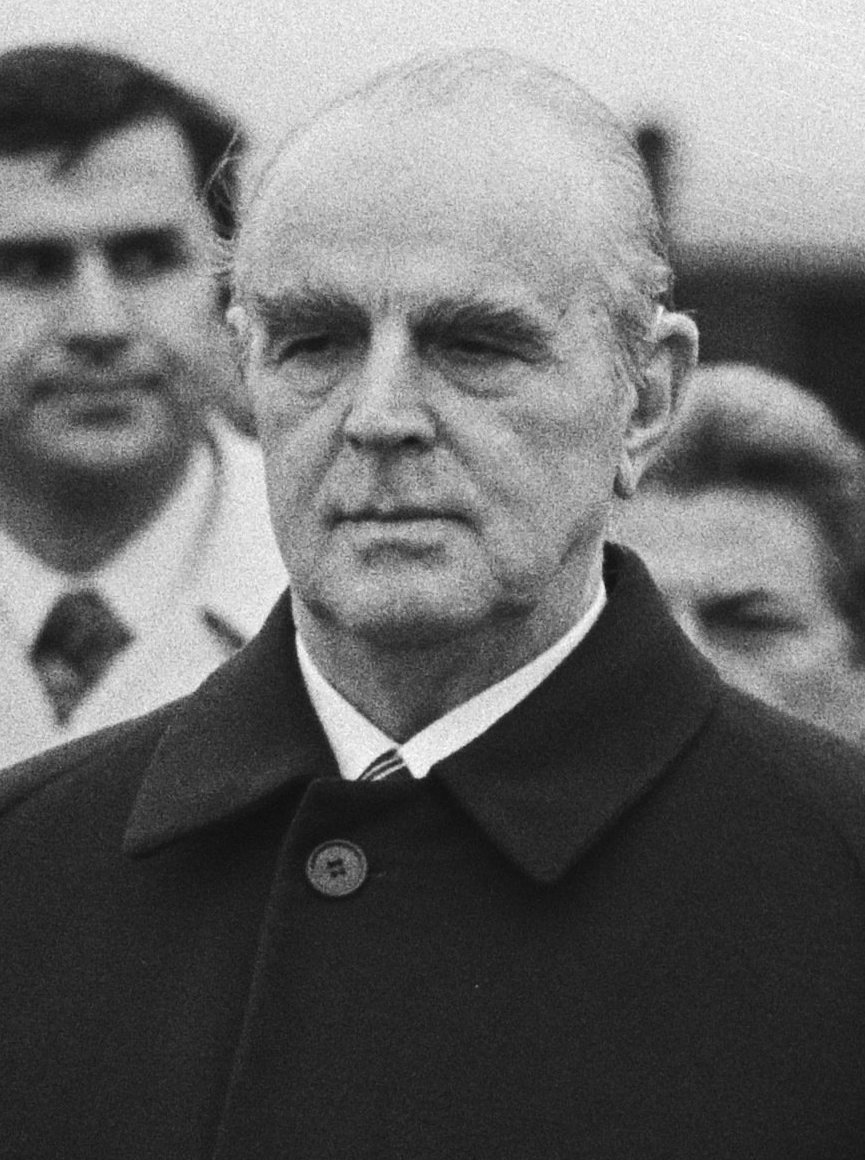
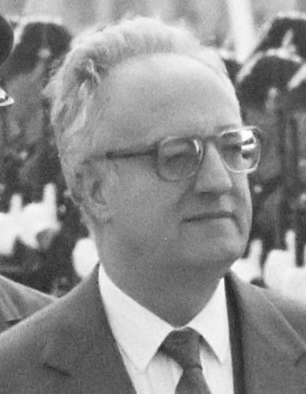
Photographs of the Presidents of the Hellenic Republic, Konstantinos Karamanlis (left) and Christos Sartzetakis (right).

On 6 March 1985, the centre-right New Democracy party announced that it would support Konstantinos Karamanlis's second term as president, while on the same day, the Communist Party of Greece (KKE) declared that it would put forward its candidate. The press anticipated that Prime Minister Andreas Papandreou would also support Karamanlis, since he had assured Karamanlis of his support in person. However, on 9 March, at the meeting of the Central Committee of Panhellenic Socialist Movement (PASOK), Papandreou sided with the left wing of the party, which instead backed Supreme Court justice Christos Sartzetakis. Sartzetakis, known for his handling of the 1963 murder of left-wing deputy Grigoris Lambrakis, was viewed favorably by the left. The announcement occurred at the Central Committee of PASOK on 9 March.

The move surprised some of Papandreou's ministers, much of his party's rank-and-file, and Sartzetakis himself, who was not consulted in advance. Journalist Robert McDonald reported that Papandreou claimed that the choice was done without Sartzetakis's knowledge to present his decision as spontaneous, however, Sartzetakis knew in advance in addition to the two senior judicial figures who had refused the nomination. At the same time, Papandreou announced plans for constitutional reform, which rekindled debate on the type of republic Greece should be and damaged the existing consensus between PASOK and New Democracy that had existed since 1981.

Papandreou also argued that it would be illogical for Karamanlis to preside over any constitutional reform since much of the 1974 constitution was influenced by Karamanlis. Mitsotakis accused Papandreou of creating a constitutional crisis in order to remove Karamanlis from office and establish a totalitarian constitution. Papandreou informed Karamanlis of his decision via his deputy, Antonios Livanis, as he could not bring himself to do so in person. In response, Karamanlis resigned from the presidency on 10 March 1985, two weeks before the termination of his term, and was replaced by PASOK's speaker of the Hellenic Parliament, Ioannis Alevras, who served as constitution of 1974.

=== Parliamentary votes for president & colored ballots ===
The presidential vote was conducted by the Hellenic Parliament in a tense and confrontational atmosphere due to constitutionally questionable procedures by Papandreou. Mitsotakis accused Papandreou of violating the constitutional principle of secret ballot (Article 32) by forcing his deputies to cast their vote with colored ballots. However, Mitsotakis' concern was dismissed because PASOK controlled the majority in the Parliament. Despite vigorous protests from the opposition, PASOK members used colored ballots under strict surveillance to spot potential defectors. Sartzetakis received 180 votes, which was the minimum stipulated by the constitution, and Alevras, as president of the Hellenic Parliament, cast the decisive vote. Mitsotakis deemed the vote illegal and threatened to remove Sartzetakis from the presidency if they won the upcoming elections, intensifying the constitutional crisis.

== Constitutional proposals & debate ==
In contrast with the constitutional violations raised during Sartzetakis' election, PASOK's procedure in proposing constitutional amendments was constitutional. However, the surprising announcement of constitutional reform amidst tense political conditions with limited input from constitutional scholars increased the possibility of the crisis intensifying. An additional constitutional amendment was added following the controversial presidential vote: the removal of a secret ballot for president. Papandreou's proposals were designed to ease future changes to the constitution in Article 110, requiring amendments to be approved by a parliamentary majority in one rather than two successive parliaments and reducing the powers of the president. While the former proposal was eventually abandoned due to its controversial nature, he was determined to eliminate presidential powers. His argument was the hypothetical case of an activist president, mimicking the tendency of kings of Greece to intervene in political life since the creation of the modern Greek state. PASOK minister Anastasios Peponis introduced the constitutional amendment package to parliament with the following argument:

Invoking the lack of use of some provisions, their lack of implementation is by no means an argument to keep them in the current constitution. The question is what is our guiding principle? When provisions directly or indirectly contradict the principle of popular sovereignty, we object to them. [...] We support that the president is neither directly appointed by nor elected by the people. We are not a presidential, we are a parliamentary democracy. It is not the president who resorts to the people, so that the people deliver a verdict by majority voting. It is the legitimate government. It is the political parties. If the president resorts to the people, then he inevitably either sides with one party against others or attempts to substitute himself for the parties and impose his own solution. Nevertheless, as soon as he attempts to substitute himself for the parties and impose his own solution, then he embarks upon the formation of his own decisions of governmental nature. Then the government, directly or indirectly, fully or partially, is abolished.

Scholars considered such changes unnecessary since no president had used these powers in the course of the Third Hellenic Republic until Papandreou raised the issue. Anna Benaki-Psarouda, New Democracy's rapporteur, presented the following argument against the proposed reforms in parliament:

This is the achievement of the 1975 Constitution: A miraculous balance between the Parliament, the Government and the President of the Republic, namely these state organs which express popular sovereignty and always pose the risk of de facto usurping it. [...] It is also interesting to see where these competencies of the President of the Republic are transferred. They are removed from him, but where do they go? To popular sovereignty and the Parliament, as the parliamentary majority claims? Dear colleagues, all of them go to the government, either directly or indirectly through the parliamentary majority controlled by it. Because the parliament is now subjugated to the parliamentary majority through party discipline. [...] Dear colleagues, the conclusion from the amendments suggested by the government or the parliamentary majority is the following: Power is transferred completely to the government. Hence, we have every reason to be afraid and suspect and mistrust about the future of Greece. [...] I want to stress the following, so that we, the Greek people, understand well: that with the suggested amendments you turn government and government majority into superpowers.

Benaki-Psarouda effectively argued that this type of majoritarianism would damage the quality of Greek democracy. Scholars also noted that the proposed changes would make the prime minister the most powerful, "autocratic," position in the Greek state, as there would not be any constitutional restraints to their authority.

== Revised provisions ==
Summary of the 1986 constitutional amendments
Chapter One: Election of the President
Provision subject to revision		Result after revision
Article 32	§§1, 4	Establishment of a roll-call vote instead of a secret ballot for the election of the President of the Republic, both in the first and subsequent ballots, in the event of the dissolution of Parliament, the calling of elections, and the formation of a new Parliament.; The provision for the dissolution of Parliament if the required majority is not achieved in the third ballot was repealed by the Ninth Revisionary Parliament in 2019.
Article 32	§2	The reference to the presidential authority, following an unsuccessful third vote for the election of a new president, to have the decree dissolving the Parliament signed by the incumbent president alone, was moved to a subsequent article, without explicitly assigning the authority to sign this decree to the President of the Hellenic Parliament in the absence of the President of the Republic.
Chapter Two: Powers and responsibility arising from the President's acts
Provision subject to revision		Result after revision
Article 35	§1	Repeal of the new prime minister's competence to countersign the decree dissolving the previous government, if the previous prime minister refuses to countersign it.; Delegation of presidential competence, in the event that the Government is relieved of its duties, so that the relevant decree is signed only by the President of the Republic if the outgoing prime minister refuses to countersign it.
Article 35	§2	Abolition of uncountersigned presidential decrees convening the Council of Ministers and the President's statutory advisory body, the Council of the Republic.; Abolition of uncountersigned presidential decrees dissolving the Parliament, following obvious discord with public sentiment, and decrees calling for a referendum on critical issues.; Provision for presidential decrees without countersignature regarding the dissolution of Parliament, following two resignations or votes of no confidence against governments during the same parliamentary term and provided there is no parliamentary composition conducive to governmental stability, provided that the Prime Minister refuses to countersign, and for the dissolution of Parliament following the normal expiration of the parliamentary term, provided that the Cabinet refuses to countersign.
Article 35	§3	Provision for the President of the Parliament to sign the decree calling for a legislative referendum.
Article 37	§§2-4	Reordering of the clauses of the paragraphs concerning the procedure for electing a leader by a parliamentary group, in the exceptional case where the party lacks a leader and representative or its leader was not elected as a member of parliament, so that it may receive a mandate to form a government or an exploratory mandate. Establishment of the timeframe for assigning the mandate.
Article 37	§3	Abolition of the presidential prerogative, provided that the exploratory mandate of the party with the largest parliamentary representation has failed, to either assign a second exploratory mandate to the leader of the second-largest party, or the appointment of a parliamentary or non-parliamentary figure as prime minister, following a relevant opinion from the Council of the Republic.; Granting the President the binding authority to successively assign exploratory mandates to party leaders until one is successful; otherwise, to appoint as Prime Minister the candidate proposed by a national unity government to conduct elections; otherwise, a caretaker prime minister should be appointed, with the option to choose from among the widely accepted presidents of the three supreme courts to conduct elections.
Article 38	§1	Abolition of the presidential prerogative, in the event that the Prime Minister has resigned or the government has lost a vote of confidence, either to entrust the mandate to form a new government to another member of Parliament, or to appoint a parliamentary or non-parliamentary figure as Prime Minister in order to conduct elections.; Granting the President the authority to appoint a new Prime Minister, provided that the Government has resigned or lost a vote of confidence, to the leader of another party, following the procedure for exploratory mandates.
Article 38	§2	Abolition of the presidential power to dissolve the Government following a relevant opinion from the Council of the Republic.; Provision for the President's authority to appoint a new Prime Minister from among the candidates proposed by the parliamentary group to which the previous Prime Minister belonged, provided that the latter has died or resigned (for personal reasons), while the Government remains in office.; This provision was amended again by the Seventh Revisionary Parliament in 2001.
Article 38	§3	Abolition of the presidential prerogative to convene the Council of Ministers under his chairmanship in extraordinary circumstances.
Article 39	§§1-2	Abolition of the presidential prerogative to convene the Council of the Republic - abolition of the institution.
Article 41	§1	Abolition of the presidential prerogative to dissolve the Parliament, following a relevant opinion of the Council of the Republic, due to the Parliament's manifest discord with public sentiment.; Granting the President the authority to dissolve Parliament if, during the current legislative session, two governments have resigned or been voted out of office and the composition of Parliament does not ensure governmental stability, in which case, the last government shall be responsible for holding elections. Otherwise, the procedure for exploratory mandates shall be followed.
Article 41	§2	Rearrangement of the provision stipulating that a Parliament, which was convened following the dissolution of the previous Parliament, upon a government proposal, to renew the popular mandate in order to address a national issue of exceptional importance, may not be dissolved again for the same issue.
Article 41	§4	Abolition of the presidential authority to sign a decree dissolving Parliament, following a relevant opinion from the Council of the Republic.; The exceptions to the rule prohibiting the dissolution of Parliament before one year has elapsed since the commencement of its session are modified. Thus, the early dissolution of Parliament is permitted: a) when, during the same parliamentary term, two governments have resigned or been voted down and the parliamentary composition does not ensure governmental stability, b) after it has been established that it is impossible to form a government that enjoys the confidence of the House, following a fruitless process of assigning exploratory mandates.
Article 41	It is expressly stated that the decree dissolving Parliament in any case (not only that initiated by the government) must mandatorily include the calling of elections within thirty days and the convening of the new Parliament within thirty days thereafter.	
Article 42	§§1-3	Abolition of the President's legislative authority to ratify (or veto) laws passed by the Parliament.; This authority is vested exclusively in the Parliament.; Henceforth, the President may only review them formally (i.e., regarding their legality) and not substantively (i.e., regarding their appropriateness), while retaining the exercise of administrative powers either to issue and publish them or to refer them back to the Parliament with a statement of reasons for possible re-voting with an increased majority (that of an absolute majority of the total number of members of Parliament).
Article 43	§3	Abolition of the presidential authority, following an opinion from a supreme council composed in part of judicial officials, to issue organizational decrees regulating matters concerning the internal structure and operation of state agencies and public organizations.
Article 44	§2, para. a	Abolition of the presidential initiative to call a consultative referendum on a critical national issue.; Transfer of this initiative to the Council of Ministers and the decision to the Parliament, which decides by an absolute majority of its total number of members.
Article 44	§2, subparagraph b	Provision for a legislative referendum on passed bills that address a serious social issue, other than fiscal matters, provided that this is decided by three-fifths of all members of Parliament, following a proposal by two-fifths of the total. Prohibition on introducing a second proposal for a legislative referendum during the same parliamentary session. The deadline for the enactment and publication of the approved bill begins on the day the referendum is held.
Article 44	§3	Abolition of the presidential authority to address the people in completely exceptional circumstances without prior countersignature by the Prime Minister.
Article 47	§3	Abolition of the presidential authority to issue decrees granting amnesty for political crimes upon the recommendation of the Council of Ministers.; Transfer of this authority to the Parliament, which decides on the granting of amnesty by law, passed by a three-fifths majority of the total number of members of Parliament.
Article 48	§§1, 4	Abolition of the presidential authority to issue a decree, countersigned by the Council of Ministers or the Prime Minister, suspending certain constitutional provisions in all or part of the territory, the establishment of special courts, and the application of the existing law on a state of siege due to war or internal threats; such a decree was in effect until the end of the war, or revoked by another presidential decree, or in any other case after thirty days, or extended only by a relevant decision of a majority of the members of Parliament present, even after the dissolution or expiration of the term of Parliament.; Assignment of this authority to the Parliament. The decision is taken by a three-fifths majority, following a government proposal, and is published by the President of the Republic. In the exceptional case where there is no Parliament or it is not possible to convene one immediately, the authority is vested in the President, who issues the relevant decree upon a proposal by the Council of Ministers; this decree must be submitted to the Parliament for approval as soon as possible and no later than fifteen days, even if the parliamentary term has expired. The measures are automatically lifted upon the end of the war or, in any other case, after fifteen days have elapsed, provided that after this period the decision to extend the measures is not renewed by a majority of the total number of members of Parliament, even after the dissolution or expiration of the term of the Parliament.
Article 48	§2	Abolition of the presidential authority to issue decrees containing the necessary regulatory and legislative measures in order to address urgent needs and restore the functioning of constitutional institutions more quickly.; Recognition of the presidential authority to issue legislative acts (Πράξεις Νομοθετικού Περιεχομένου), upon a government proposal, which must be submitted to Parliament for ratification within fifteen days of their publication and voted on within fifteen days of their submission, otherwise they cease to be in force. Provision prohibiting the amendment of the law on the state of siege while it is in effect.

== Aftermath ==
=== Elections of 1985 ===
The logo of PASOK displaying a rising sun. Papandreou implied in his election campaign in 1985 that PASOK represented the "forces of light" while the opposition the "forces of darkness."

The confrontation from the presidential election continued into the general election campaigns and polarized Greek society. On one hand, Papandreou invoked memories of the Greek Civil War of 1946 until 1949 and the junta of 1967 until 1974, associating New Democracy with authoritarian right-wingers of the past with the slogan "Vote PASOK to prevent a return of the Right." The communists, persecuted by right-wing parties in the 1950s, protested against Papandreou's rhetoric, pointing out that the 1980s were not the same as the 1950s. Papandreou further characterized the upcoming elections as a fight between light and darkness in his rallies, implying that PASOK represented the "forces of light" since its logo was a rising sun. On the other side, Mitsotakis declared that "in voting, the Greek people will also be voting for a president," also warning of the danger of sliding towards an authoritarian one-party state.

In the election, PASOK was re-elected with 45.82% of the vote, losing approximately 2.3% from 1981, while New Democracy increased its share of the vote by 4.98% to 40.84%. Papandreou's gamble worked to his benefit because he gained from far-left voting blocs, covering the losses from centrist voters, and appealed to socialist voters who rejected Karamanlis's perceived hindrance of PASOK's policies. Papandreou had the upper hand over Mitsotakis in that he argued that a vote for Mitsotakis is a vote for a constitutional anomaly for threatening to remove the president once elected, convincing a significant fraction of Greek voters.

After the election results, Mitsotakis accepted Sartzetakis as president and head of the state. Papandreou's constitutional proposals took effect on 14 March 1986.

=== Court ruling ===
The case also reached the courts, with the plenary session of the Council of State ruling that the direct judicial review of the election of the president was inadmissible and the Athens One-member Magistrates' Court ruling in passing that the election of the president was "irregular" and "amounted to an abrogation of popular sovereignty", (Note: κατάργηση στη συγκεκριμένη περίπτωση του Εκλογικού Σώματος ως οργάνου εξουσίας και κατάλυση στην πράξη της αρχής της λαϊκής κυριαρχίας.") while it considered that the subsequent political legitimacy assumed by PASOK's victory in the 1985 election did not negate the unconstitutionality of the act. (Note: "[...] ανεξάρτητα του ζητήματος της θεμελίωσης της νομιμοποιήσεως της εξουσίας του Προέδρου της Δημοκρατίας στη κανονιστική δύναμη των πραγμάτων που ρύθμισαν οι εκλογές και της αναγνωρίσεως του αποτελέσματος της ρυθμίσεως.") Constitutional scholar Christos Papastylianos noted this as an instance which marked the limits of judicial jurisdiction in Greece: the courts can deem an action as unconstitutional but unable to prevent it.

== Scholarly assessment ==
Scholars generally view the constitutional revision of 1985 as a calculated maneuver which aimed to consolidate power and reshape Greece's democratic institutions, criticized as "unnecessary" and driven by partisan motives rather than genuine institutional reform. Specifically, constitutional scholar Aristovoulos Manesis argued that the constitutional amendments weakened the democraticness of the constitution due to the concentration of power in the prime minister's position along with the emerging statist bureaucracies and technologies aimed at controlling the popular will. Political scientist Minas Samatas also contested that the constitutional reforms enabled Papandreou to restructure the government and personally direct the National Defence council. This also enabled PASOK to consolidate its power by repurposing the junta's military surveillance for political ends, combined with populist rhetoric and extensive patronage networks aimed at mobilizing and controlling the electorate. These practices aimed at safeguarding Papandreou's leadership both within his party and as prime minister. Political scientist Takis Pappas argued that the Greek constitutional reforms marked a shift from a liberal democracy to a "populist democracy," characterized by a more centralized and populist model of governance.

Analysts outlined different motives behind this move. Manaesis argues that the constitutional revision was a pretext for removing a respected conservative figure from head of state, a move that appealed to left-wing voters eager for change after decades of conservative rule in the lead-up to the national elections. Historians John S. Koliopoulos, Thanos M. Veremis, and Kevin Featherstone consider that the public discourse was dominated by the nature of the constitutional revisions and the dubious conduct of the presidential election, effectively diverting public attention from worsening economic conditions, marked by high inflation, growing trade deficits, and surging unemployment. Political scientist Dimitrios Katsoudas wrote that Papandreou had long-term constitutional designs to reinforce his government party against an impotent parliament.

Scholars Stathis Kalyvas and Richard Clogg note that the constitutional revision was not a direct threat to democracy; however, it eroded the long-term legitimacy of the constitutional order. Manesis advocated for strengthening individual rights and institutions as a counterweight to the executive branch led by the prime minister. Former Finance Minister Stefanos Manos and constitutional scholar Nikos Alivizatos have suggested partially reversing the removal of presidential powers to mitigate the negative effects of majoritarian politics while avoiding potential conflicts between the president and prime minister.

== Sources ==
Constitutions of Greece

- "Greek Constitution of 1975". Government Gazette (Greece) ΦΕΚ A 111/1975 (in Greek). National Printing Office.
- "Voting, publication, and entry into force of the revised provisions of the Constitution". Government Gazette (Greece) ΦΕΚ A 22/1986 (in Greek). National Printing Office.
- "Greek Constitution of 1986". Government Gazette (Greece) ΦΕΚ A 23/1986 (in Greek). National Printing Office.

Court decisions

- 2862/1985 Plenary decision (Council of State 1985).
- 84464/1985 Αρχείον Νομολογίας (Magistrate's Court (Μονομελούς Πλημμελειοδικείου Αθηνών) 1985).

Books

- Carabott, Philip; Sfikas, Thanassis D., eds. (2004). The Greek Civil War: essays on a conflict of exceptionalism and silences. Surrey: Ashgate. ISBN 9780754641322.
- Clogg, Richard (1987). Parties and elections in Greece: the search for legitimacy. North Carolina: Duke University Press. ISBN 0822307944.
- Clogg, Richard, ed. (1993). Greece, 1981–89: The Populist Decade. London & New York: Palgrave Macmillan. ISBN 9781349230563.
  - Alivizatos, Nikos C. "The Presidency, Parliament and the Courts in the 1980s". In Clogg (1993), pp. 65–77.
- Clogg, Richard (2013). A Concise History of Greece. Cambridge: Cambridge University Press. ISBN 9781107656444.
- Featherstone, Kevin; Katsoudas, Dimitrios K., eds. (1987). Political change in Greece: Before and after the colonels. London & New York: Taylor & Francis. ISBN 9781000992144.
  - Katsoudas, Dimitrios K. "The Constitutional framework". In Featherstone & Katsoudas (1987), pp. 14–33.
- Featherstone, Kevin; Papadimitriou, Dimitris (2015). Prime Ministers in Greece, The Paradox of Power. Oxford: Oxford University Press. ISBN 9780198717171.
- Featherstone, Kevin; Sotiropoulos, Dimitri A., eds. (2020). The Oxford Handbook of Modern Greek Politics. Oxford: Oxford University Press. ISBN 978-0198825104.
  - Alivizatos, Nikos C. "Greek constitutionalism and patterns of government". In Featherstone & Sotiropoulos (2020), pp. 103–116.
- Γρηγοριάδης, Ιωάννης N., ed. (2017). Democratic transition and the rise of Populist Majoritarianism: Constitutional Reform in Greece and Turkey. Cham: Palgrave Macmillan. ISBN 9783319575551.
  - Grigoriadis, Ioannis N. "The Rising Tide of Populist Majoritarianism in Greece". In Γρηγοριάδης (2017), pp. 14–33.
- Koliopoulos, John S.; Veremis, Thanos M. [in Greek] (2009). Modern Greece A History Since 1821. Oxford: Wiley-Blackwell. ISBN 9781444314830.
- Manesis, Aristovoulos (1989). Η συνταγματική αναθεώρηση του 1986 [Constitutional resivion of 1986] (in Greek). Athens: Παρατηρητής. ISBN 9789602603543.
- Pappas, Takis (2014). Populism and crisis politics in Greece (in Greek). Palgrave Macmillan. ISBN 9781137410580.
- Papastylianos, Christos (2023), Σύνταγμα, Ερμηνεία κατ' άρθρο, Άρθρο 120 [Constitution, Interpretation per Article, Article 120], archived from the original on 24 February 2023
- Pridham, Geoffrey, ed. (1990). Securing Democracy, Political Parties and Democratic Consolidation in Southern Europe. London & New York: Routledge. ISBN 9780415023269.
  - Featherstone, Kevin. "Political Parties and democratic consolidation in Greece". In Pridham (1990), pp. 179–202.

Journals

- Clogg, Richard (1985). "The 1985 Constitutional Crisis in Greece". The Journal of Modern Hellenism. 2 (1): 103–112. Archived from the original on 21 March 2020.
- Featherstone, Kevin (1990b). "The 'party-state' in Greece and the fall of Papandreou". West European Politics. 13 (1): 101–115. doi:10.1080/01402389008424782.
- Kalyvas, Stathis N. (1997). "Polarization in Greek Politics: PASOK's First Four Years, 1981-1985". Journal of the Hellenic Diaspora. 23 (1): 83–104. Archived from the original on 13 April 2024.
- McDonald, Robert (1985). "Greece after PASOK's Victory". The World Today. 41 (7): 133–136. JSTOR 40395748.
- Samatas, Minas (1993). "The Populist Phase of an Underdeveloped Surveillance Society: Political Surveillance in Post-Dictatorial Greece". Journal of the Hellenic Diaspora. 19 (1): 31–70. Archived from the original on 29 February 2024.

Web and other sources

- "Greece's unemployment (%)". International Monetary Fund. Archived from the original on 22 March 2025.
- "Greece's inflation rate (%)". International Monetary Fund. Archived from the original on 13 June 2024.
