= Greek Constitution of 1952 =

1952 Greek Constitution in Government Gazette

The Greek Constitution of 1952 established the constitutional framework for a parliamentary monarchy, defining the relationship between the monarchy, the Hellenic Parliament, and the government. It took effect on 1 January 1952, following a turbulent period of the Civil War (1946–1949). Largely based on the Constitution of 1911, it reinforced the principle of the separation of powers while retaining considerable authority for the king, which included powers to appoint and dismiss ministers, and also to dissolve parliament. It was also the first constitution recognizing women's right to vote and to stand for parliamentary office; women participated in national elections for the first time in 1956. The constitution also introduced provisions to facilitate foreign investment, reflecting Greece's efforts to promote economic development.

Although it contributed to political stability in the 1950s, the constitutional framework left tensions between elected governments and the monarchy unresolved. This friction became central during the 1960s with the rise of Georgios Papandreou and his son Andreas Papandreou. Both challenged the authority of King Constantine II on various fronts, but this led to a constitutional crisis that lasted two years, known as Iouliana. The failure to resolve these divisions culminated in the military coup of 1967, which suspended the constitution. The constitution was temporarily restored after the collapse of military rule in 1974 before being superseded by the Constitution of 1975.

== Background ==
Since gaining independence in 1821, Greece has experienced persistent instability. Early governments were weak and burdened by debt from the independence struggle. Throughout the 19th century, tensions deepened between citizens seeking broader political participation and elites aligned with the crown and external interests, contributing to repeated military interventions and a series of coups extending into the 20th century.

Early military movements secured reforms, notably the 3 September 1843 Revolution, which established a constitutional monarchy. The 1909 Goudi coup brought Eleftherios Venizelos to power as the prime minister; he modernized the country through a series of liberal reforms and expanded its territory. However, the clash between the two poles of executive power, the prime minister and the king as head of state (King Constantine I at the time), became visible over Greece's entry into World War I, which divided Greek society and the armed forces, and became known as the National Schism. This turmoil produced a short-lived republic between 1924 and 1935 before the monarchy was restored, followed by further authoritarian rule under Ioannis Metaxas in 1936.

Metaxas's dictatorship was followed by the devastation of the Axis occupation of Greece from 1941 to 1945, and then the Greek Civil War from 1946 to 1949, both of which caused severe economic damage and created deep social divisions; in the former, between Greeks who resisted Axis occupation and those who collaborated, and in the latter, between the communist resistance groups who refused to hand over power to the Greek royalist government upon its return from Cairo, Egypt, where it was stationed during the Second World War. After the defeat of the communists in the Civil War in 1949, the country was under martial law for three years, and the subsequent governments relied heavily on U.S. aid through the Marshall Plan while focusing on containing communism during the Cold War.

== New constitutional order ==
In 1952, the Greek government, under Nikolaos Plastiras as prime minister and King Paul of Greece, established a new constitution that provided for a parliamentary monarchy. The King served as head of state and commander of the Hellenic Army. The constitution formally enshrined the principle of the separation of powers. Although largely based on the Constitution of 1911, it effectively constituted a new constitutional framework, as its adoption did not follow the revision procedure stipulated in the earlier constitution.

The new constitution introduced several new provisions, including universal suffrage, which allowed women to vote for the first time in the 1956 parliamentary elections. To attract foreign capital, Article 112 was introduced to provide a special legal status for legislation protecting foreign capital invested in Greece. In 1953, the Hellenic Parliament enacted Legislative Decree 2687, establishing a legal framework that provided protections to foreign investment through special legal guarantees. Because of its constitutional recognition, its provisions could not be amended or repealed without a constitutional reform, providing the highest level of legal protection to investors. While political dialogue revolved around shifting power from the right to the center, reconciliation remained a lower priority than economic reconstruction.

While the new constitution brought stability in the 1950s compared to the previous decade, the king retained considerable powers. A king could dissolve the government and call new elections. Moreover, Article 31 stated that the king hires and fires ministers. (Note: Specifically, the Article 31 states: Greek: Ο βασιλεύς διορίζει και παύει τους υπουργούς αυτού.) This created confusion as the prime minister was chosen by popular election, but the elected prime minister could not select the government's ministers without the king's approval. Two prime ministers in the 1950s had raised the question of who governed the state, the king or the prime minister, echoing the disagreements between Eleftherios Venizelos and Constantine I during the National Schism.

From 1955 to 1963, Greece was governed by Prime Minister Konstantinos Karamanlis, who was widely acknowledged for bringing political stability to Greece along with rapid economic growth. However, in the early 1960s, there was a growing awareness that the repressive measures taken due to the civil war and its aftermath were no longer needed. This became clear with the assassination of a left-wing member of parliament Grigoris Lambrakis, in which several high state officials were found to be involved either in the assassination or in its cover-up. While no one, even from the severest of his left-wing critics, blamed Karamanlis for the incident, he resigned and self-exiled to France.

== Rise of Center Union and friction with the King ==
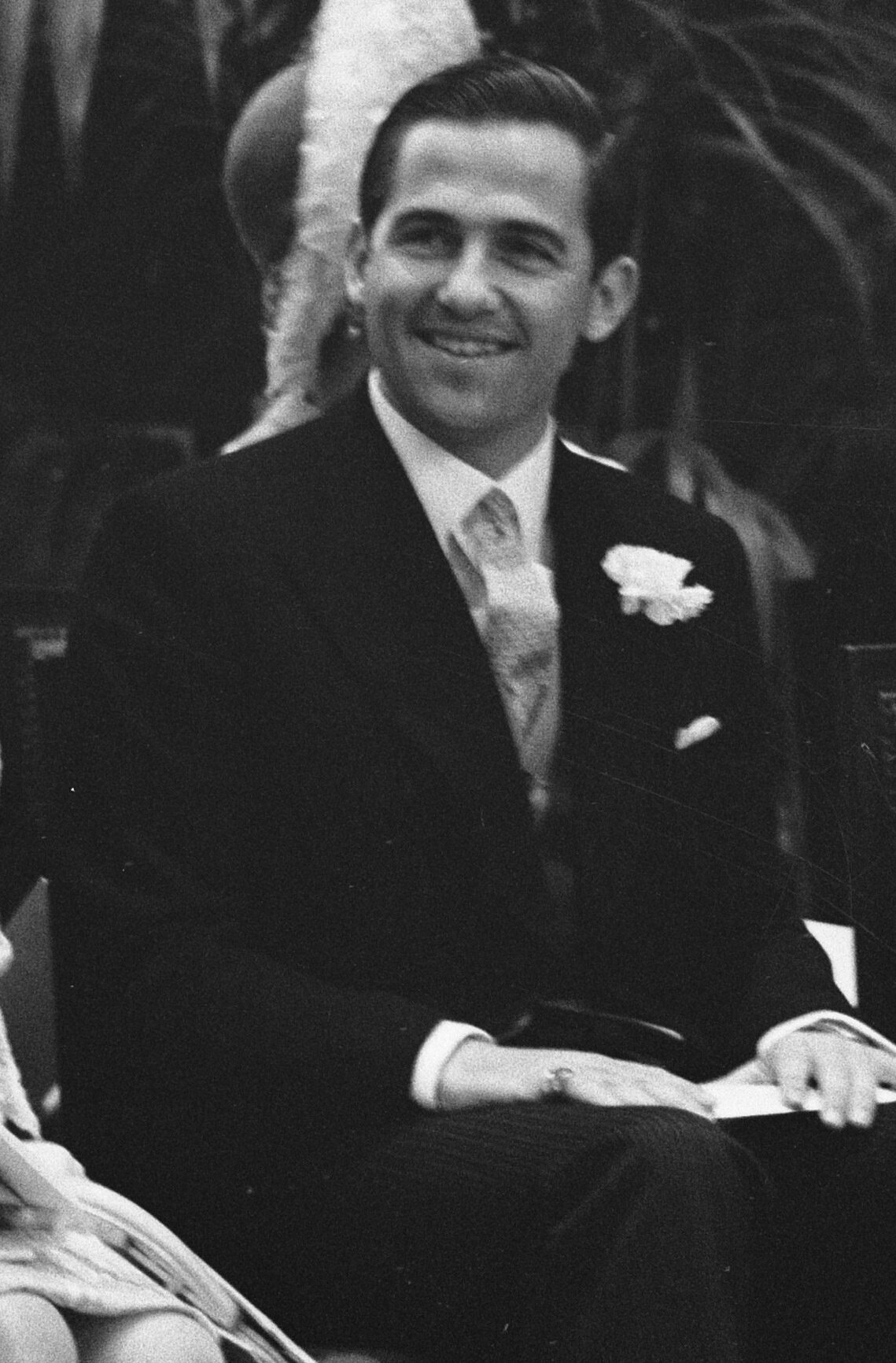
Constantine as king in 1966, a year before the junta

Georgios Papandreou and his political party, Center Union, having a moderate reformist platform, gained considerable traction and rose to power in the elections of 1963 and later in the elections of 1964. However, seeds of resentment towards Papandreou from the military grew as they were excluded from salary increases. He also made a faint attempt to gain control of the military by attempting to purge it of rightist officers, which alarmed many officers without weakening them. The latter created friction with King Constantine II, who wanted to command the army rather than the elected government. In the meantime, the son of Georgios Papandreou, Andreas Papandreou, who had joined Greek politics after 23 years in the United States as a prominent academic, was campaigning with fierce anti-monarchy and anti-American rhetoric. His stance put him at odds with the Americans, the Palace, and the conservative establishment, but also with his father, who sought a more moderate approach. Andreas's militant and uncompromising stance destabilized the fragile political equilibrium. Andreas being supported by his father for the leadership of Center Union made him a target of conspiratorial accusations from ultra-rightists who feared that following any new elections, which the nearly 80-year-old Georgios Papandreou would likely win, his son would be the actual focus of power in the party. These incidents caused a dispute between Georgios Papandreou and King Constantine II, leading to the resignation of the former.

For the next twenty-two months, there was no elected government, and hundreds of demonstrations took place, with many being injured and killed in clashes with the police, a series of events that was named Iouliana. The king, potentially acting within his constitutional rights but with a politically dubious approach, tried to bring members of the Center Union party to his side and form a government. He temporarily succeeded in getting 45 members to his side, including Konstantinos Mitsotakis, a prominent Center Union member and considered a potential successor to Georgios Papandreou for the party leadership. Papandreous' supporters later called these defectors 'apostates'. To end the political deadlock, Georgios Papandreou attempted a more moderate approach with the king, but Andreas Papandreou publicly rejected his father's effort and attacked the whole establishment, attracting the support of 41 members of the Center Union in an effort designed to gain the party's leadership and prevent any compromise.

== Junta, revival and new constitution ==
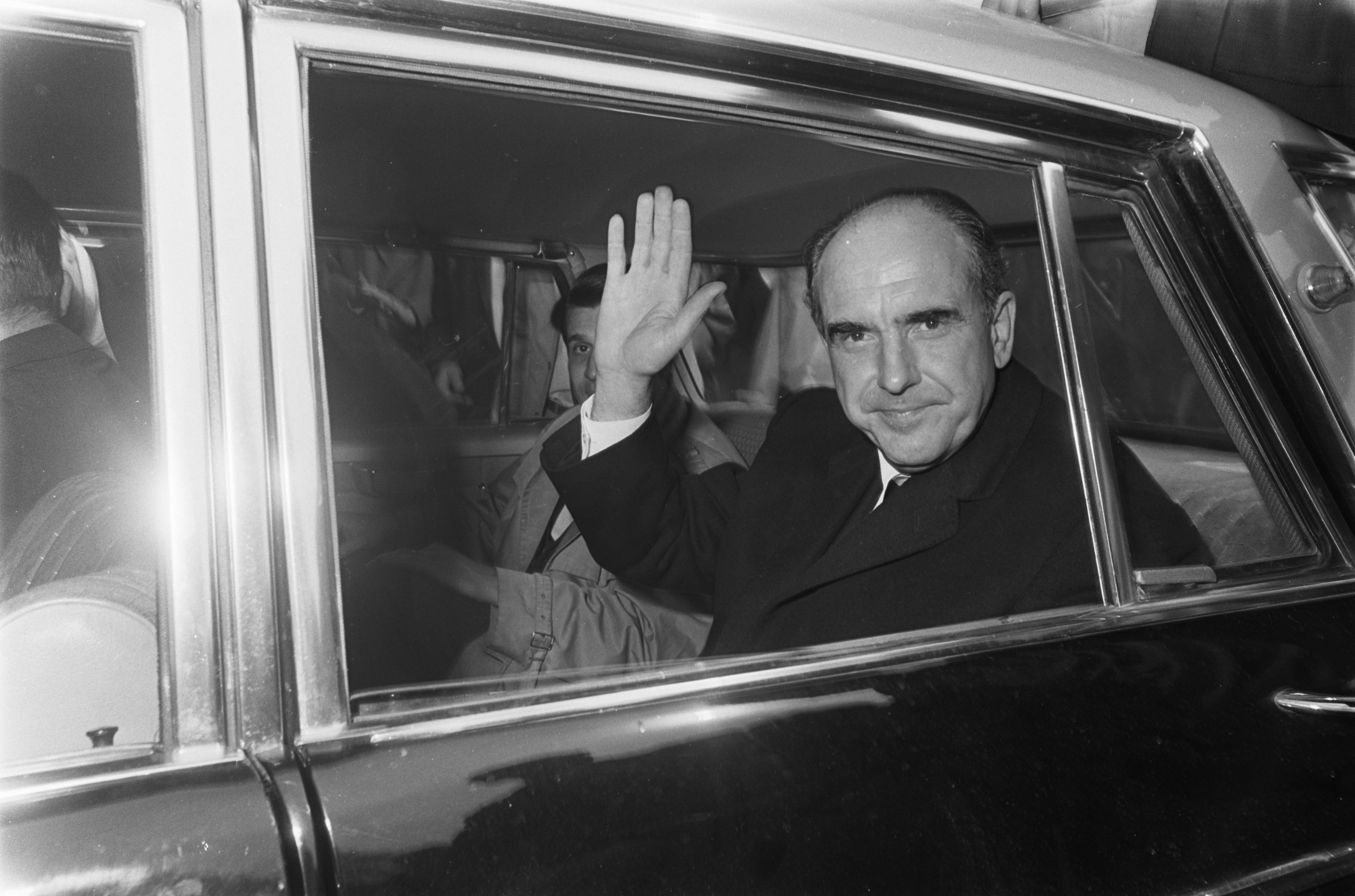
Andreas Papandreou in exile

The prolonged political instability between the politicians and the king in finding a solution led a group of Colonels to intervene. On 21 April 1967, a coup took place by right-wing officers, which established a dictatorship known as the Colonels' Regime. King Constantine II attempted a counter-coup in December, but it failed, forcing him to leave the country in exile. Several prominent politicians were either imprisoned or exiled, including Andreas Papandreou and Mitsotakis. A new constitution was adopted by referendum in 1968. King Constantine was officially retained as head of state, though he would not be allowed to return until the first parliamentary election unless the government recalled him sooner. Many of the guarantees of civil rights were suspended. A modified constitution was proposed in 1973 to exclude the monarchy from the constitution.

In 1974, the Colonels were unable to prevent the Turkish invasion of Cyprus, breaking the internal cohesion of the military regime. The invasion further made the regime widely unpopular, leading the military leaders to hand power to politicians, who invited Kalamanlis back to Greece from exile. With the return of civilian rule under Karamanlis, the new government, acting under extraordinary circumstances, issued a "Constituting Act" which voided the junta's Constitution of 1973. Pending a referendum on a new constitution, the 1952 constitution was temporarily restored, "except for the articles dealing with the form of the State"; the last phrase referred to whether the monarchy would be restored. In the meantime, the functions of the king were to be discharged by the incumbent President Phaedon Gizikis, who was appointed by the junta's regime as a nominal figurehead. In the November 1974 parliamentary election, Karamanlis received 56% of the vote and a mandate to set the foundations of the new state. In the December 1974 republic referendum, 69% of voters chose a parliamentary republic with a president as head of state and commander-in-chief of the armed forces, while 30% chose constitutional monarchy. The outcome of the referendum effectively ended 150 years of monarchical rule. This led to the foundation of the Third Hellenic Republic with the new Constitution of 1975.

== Sources ==
Constitutions of Greece

- "Greek Constitution of 1952". Government Gazette (Greece) ΦΕΚ A 1/1952 (in Greek). National Printing Office.

Books

- Clogg, Richard (2013). A Concise History of Greece. Cambridge: Cambridge University Press. ISBN 9781107656444.
- Close, David H. (2014). Greece since 1945: Politics, Economy and Society. London & New York: Taylor & Francis. ISBN 9781317880011.
- Curtis, Glenn E. (1995). Greece, A Country Study. Maryland: Library of Congress. ISBN 1490436235.
- Dervitsiotis, Alkis (2019). Η έννοια της Κυβέρνησης (in Greek). Athens: P.N. Sakkoulas SA. ISBN 9789604208005.
- Featherstone, Kevin; Papadimitriou, Dimitris (2015). Prime Ministers in Greece, The Paradox of Power. Oxford: Oxford University Press. ISBN 978-0198717171.
- Hatzivassiliou, Evanthis [in Greek] (2006). Greece and the Cold War Front Line State, 1952-1967. London & New York: Taylor & Francis. ISBN 9781134154883.
- Kofas, Jon V. (2005). Independence from America: global integration and inequality. Burlington: Ashgate. ISBN 9780754645085.
- Koliopoulos, John S.; Veremis, Thanos M. [in Greek] (2009). Modern Greece A History Since 1821. Oxford: Wiley-Blackwell. ISBN 9781444314830.
- Lagos, Katerina; Othon, Anastasakis, eds. (2021). The Greek Military Dictatorship Revisiting a Troubled Past, 1967-1974. New York & London: Berghahn Books. ISBN 9781800731752.
- Liakos, Antonis [in Greek]; Doumanis, Nicholas (2023). The Edinburgh History of the Greeks, 20th and Early 21st Centuries: Global Perspectives. Edinburgh: Edinburgh University Press. ISBN 978-1474410847.
- Mouzelis, Nicos P. (1978). Modern Greece: Facets of Underdevelopment. London: The Macmillan Press Ltd. ISBN 978-0333226155.
- Spyropoulos, Philippos C.; Fortsakis, Theodore P. (2017). Constitutional Law in Greece. Netherlands: Wolters Kluwer. ISBN 9789041192448.
- United Nations (1954). Yearbook on Human Rights for 1952 (PDF). New York: United Nations.

Journals

- Clive, Nigel (1985). "The 1985 Greek Election and its Background". Government and Opposition. 20 (4): 488–503. JSTOR 44483257.
- Clogg, Richard (1975). "Karamanlis's cautious success: the background". Government and Opposition. 10 (3): 255–332. JSTOR 44483305.
- Clogg, Richard (1996). "Andreas Papandreou – A political profile". Mediterranean Politics. 1 (3): 382–387. doi:10.1080/13629399608414596.
- Efthyvoulou, Georgios; Kammas, Pantelis; Sarantides, Vassilis (2020). "Gender voting gap in the dawn of urbanization: evidence from a quasi-experiment with Greek special elections" (PDF). LSE Research Online Documents on Economics (146).
- Kaloudis, George (2000). "Transitional democratic politics in Greece". International Journal on World Peace. 17 (1): 35–39. JSTOR 20753241.
- Karamouzi, Eirini (2015). "A strategy for Greece: Democratization and European integration, 1974-1975". Cahiers de la Méditerranée. 90 (90): 11–24. doi:10.4000/cdlm.7858.
- Markesinis, Basil S. (1973). "Reflections on the Greek Constitution". Parliamentary Affairs. 27 (1973September): 8–27. doi:10.1093/parlij/27.1973sep.8.
- Terlexis, Pantazis (1971). "The Military and the Greek Constitution: a Comparison Between the New and the Old Document". Western Political Quarterly. 24 (3): 449–455. doi:10.1177/106591297102400305.
- Steiner, P.O. (1967). "Foreign capital investment in Greece". Balkan Studies. 8 (2): 339–352.
- Tsarouhas, Dimitris (2005). "Explaining an activist military: Greece until 1975" (PDF). Southeast European Politics. 6 (1): 1–13.
