= Panagis =

Panagis is the name of:

- Panagis Kalkos (1818–1875), Greek architect
- Panagis Tsaldaris (1868–1936), Greek politician
- Panagis Vourloumis (1867–1950), Greek politician

== See also ==
- Panagi, surname
