= Clogg =

Clogg as a surname can refer to:

- Richard Clogg (born 1939), British historian
- Tramun Clogg, fictional character created by Brian Jacques
