= Modern Greece: A History Since 1821 =

2009 book by John S. Koliopoulos

- Author: John S. Koliopoulos; Thanos Veremis
- Published: 1 January 2009
- Publisher: John Wiley & Sons
- ISBN: 978-1-4443-1483-0

Modern Greece: A History Since 1821 is a book written by John S. Koliopoulos and Thanos Veremes. This book was first published on 1 January 2009.

== Synopsis ==
The book provides a chronological narrative of the social, political and economic history of modern Greece, beginning with the outbreak of the Greek War of Independence in 1821 until 2008. The book is divided into thirteen chapters.
