= Panagi =

Panagi is a surname. Notable people with the surname include:

- Antonis Panagi (born 1983), Cypriot footballer
- Constantinos Panagi (born 1994), Cypriot footballer
- Giorgos Panagi (born 1986), Cypriot footballer
- Nektaria Panagi (born 1990), Cypriot long jumper

== See also ==
- Panagis, given name
