= Panagis Vourloumis =

Greek politician, lawyer, economist and finance minister

- Born: 1867; Koumani, Olympia, Elis, Greece
- Died: 1950 (aged 82–83); Athens, Greece
- Occupation: politician

Panagis Vourloumis (Greek: Παναγής Βουρλούμης; 1867–1950) was a Greek politician, lawyer and economist. He was a finance minister and one of the main collaborators of Eleftherios Venizelos. He studied law at the University of Athens and worked in Marseille as the director of a raisin export company. In 1893, he founded his own business in Patras. He was first elected into the Hellenic Parliament on the Liberal Party ticket in the 1910 elections. He served as Food Supply Minister in 1918-1920 and as Minister of National Economy in the last Venizelos cabinet of 1928-1932. His tenure in the Ministry of National Economy was significant, as he promoted the foundation of a number of institutions: the Autonomous Tourism Organization, the Workers' Home and the Textiles Organization. He also led the reorganization of the National Statistical Service of Greece, and prepared the legislation for the eventual Social Insurance Institute. He failed to be elected in the 1933 elections, and withdrew from politics following Venizelos' death in 1936.

He also served for a time as chairman of the Panachaiki sports club.
