= Nikos Alivizatos =

Greek jurist, academic and politician (born 1949)

- Νίκος Αλιβιζάτος
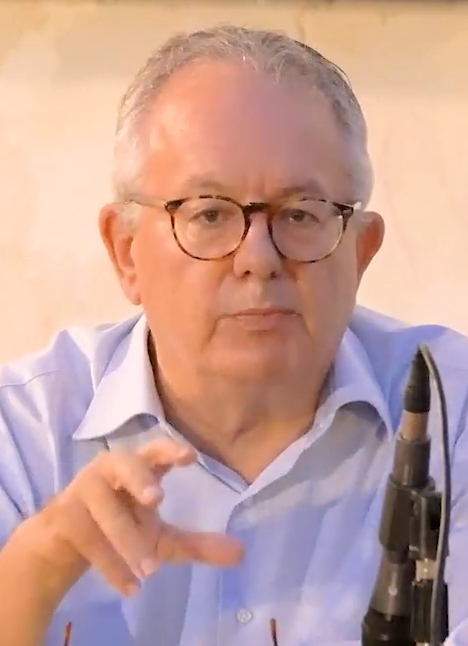

Minister of the Interior
- In office 13 February 2004 – 10 March 2004
- Prime Minister: Costas Simitis
- Preceded by: Kostas Skandalidis
- Succeeded by: Prokopis Pavlopoulos

Personal details
- Born: 1949 (age 76–77) Athens, Greece

Nikos Alivizatos (Greek: Νίκος Αλιβιζάτος; born 1949) is a Greek jurist, academic and politician. He is currently a professor of Constitutional Law at the University of Athens. Alivizatos served as the Minister of the Interior for one month in the Third Cabinet of Costas Simitis.

== Education ==
Alivizatos completed an LLB at the University of Athens in 1972. He completed an LLM at the Panthéon-Assas University in 1973 and a doctorate from the same university in 1977. His doctoral supervisor was Georges Vedel.

== Political career ==
On 13 February 2004, in the run-up to the 7 March legislative election, he was appointed interim Minister for the Interior, Public Administration and Decentralization in the cabinet of Kostas Simitis. Following the electoral victory of the opposition New Democracy party, he resigned along with the rest of the cabinet on 10 March.

On 17 February 2015, he was nominated by The River party as a candidate for the presidency of the Republic in the Greek presidential election, 2014–15. He stood against Prokopis Pavlopoulos, a veteran New Democracy politician, nominated by Syriza and supported by ND, Syriza and the latter's coalition partner, ANEL. Alivizatos was also supported by the socialist PASOK. On 18 February, Pavlopoulos was elected as the new President of the Republic with 233 votes in favour, while 30 were for Alivizatos, and 32 MPs (from the Communists and Golden Dawn) voted "present".

Political offices
| Preceded by Kostas Skandalidis | Minister of the Interior; 2004 | Succeeded by Prokopis Pavlopoulos |
