= Nicholas Doumanis =

Australian historian

Nicholas Doumanis is a historian of Europe and the Mediterranean world. Born in Australia in 1964, he studied at the University of Sydney and the University of New South Wales, where he acquired his PhD.

Nicholas is Hellenic Foundation and Illinois Chair in Hellenic Studies and Professor of History at the University of Illinois Chicago. He was an associate professor of history at the University of New South Wales, an ARC Research Fellow at the University of Sydney, and lecturer in European history at the University of Newcastle. He was awarded the Fraenkel Prize (London) in Contemporary European History for Myth and Memory in the Mediterranean. He has also published: Italy, Inventing the Nation with Arnold Press, A History of Greece with Palgrave Macmillan, which covers the span of Paleolithic to contemporary Greece, and Before the Nation with Oxford University Press, which describes everyday life in the late Ottoman Greek world. He edited The Oxford Handbook of Europe 1914–1945 in 2016, and most recently co-authored The Edinburgh History of the Greeks, 1909 to 2012: A Transnational History with Antonis Liakos. He is now writing a history of the Eastern Mediterranean from the Palaeolithic to the present for Wiley Blackwell in its History of the World series. Doumanis is the founder and director of the Greek-Australian Archive of NSW, Australia, is a member of the Australian Committee for the Return of the Parthenon Sculptures, and was the editor of The Journal of Religious History.

== Bibliography ==
- Nicholas Doumanis & Antonis Liakos, The Edinburgh History of the Greeks, 20th and early 21st centuries: Global Perspectives, Edinburgh University, Edinburgh, 2023.
- Before the Nation: Muslim-Christian Coexistence and Its Destruction in Late-Ottoman Anatolia (Oxford: Oxford University Press, 2013)
- A History of Greece (Essential Histories Series) (UK: Palgrave Macmillan, 2009)
- Italy: Inventing the Nation (London and New York: Arnold and Oxford University Press, 2002)
- Una faccia, una razza (Il Mulino, 2003)
- Myth and Memory in the Mediterranean: Remembering Fascism's Empire (London and New York: Macmillan and St. Martin's Press, 1997),
- 'The Ottoman Empire' The Age of Empires, Robert Aldrich (ed), (Thames and Hudson, 2007), pp. 26–43
- 'Europe and the Wider World' Robert Gerwath (ed), Twisted Paths: Europe 1915-1945 (Oxford University Press, Oxford, 2007), pp. 355–80
- 'Durable Empire: State virtuosity and social accommodation in the Ottoman Mediterranean', The Historical Journal 49.3 (2006), pp, 953-66
- 'History Writ Large', Australian Journal of Politics and History, 51.1 (2005), pp. 114–124
- 'Trading Patterns, The Mediterranean', Berkshire Encyclopaedia of World History, edited by William H. McNeill, (Boston, 2005), pp. 1870–73
- 'Italians as "Good" Colonizers', Ben Ghiat and Mia Fuller (eds), Italian Colonialism (Palgrave, 2005), pp. 221–232
- 'The Greeks in Australia', in Richard Clogg (ed.), The Greek Diaspora in the Twentieth Century (Macmillan, London, 1999), pp 58–86
- ‘The Italian Empire and brava gente: Oral History and the Dodecanese Islands, in R.J.B. Bosworth and Patrizia Dogliani (ed), Italian Fascism: History, Memory and Representation (Macmillan, London, 1999), pp. 161–77
- 'Grand History in Small Places: Social Protest on Castellorizo (1934)', Journal of Modern Greek Studies, 15.1 (1997), pp. 103–123
- 'Eastern Orthodoxy and Migrant Conflict', Journal of Religious History 17.1 (1992), pp. 60–77
