= Government Gazette (Greece) =

Official publication of the government of Greece

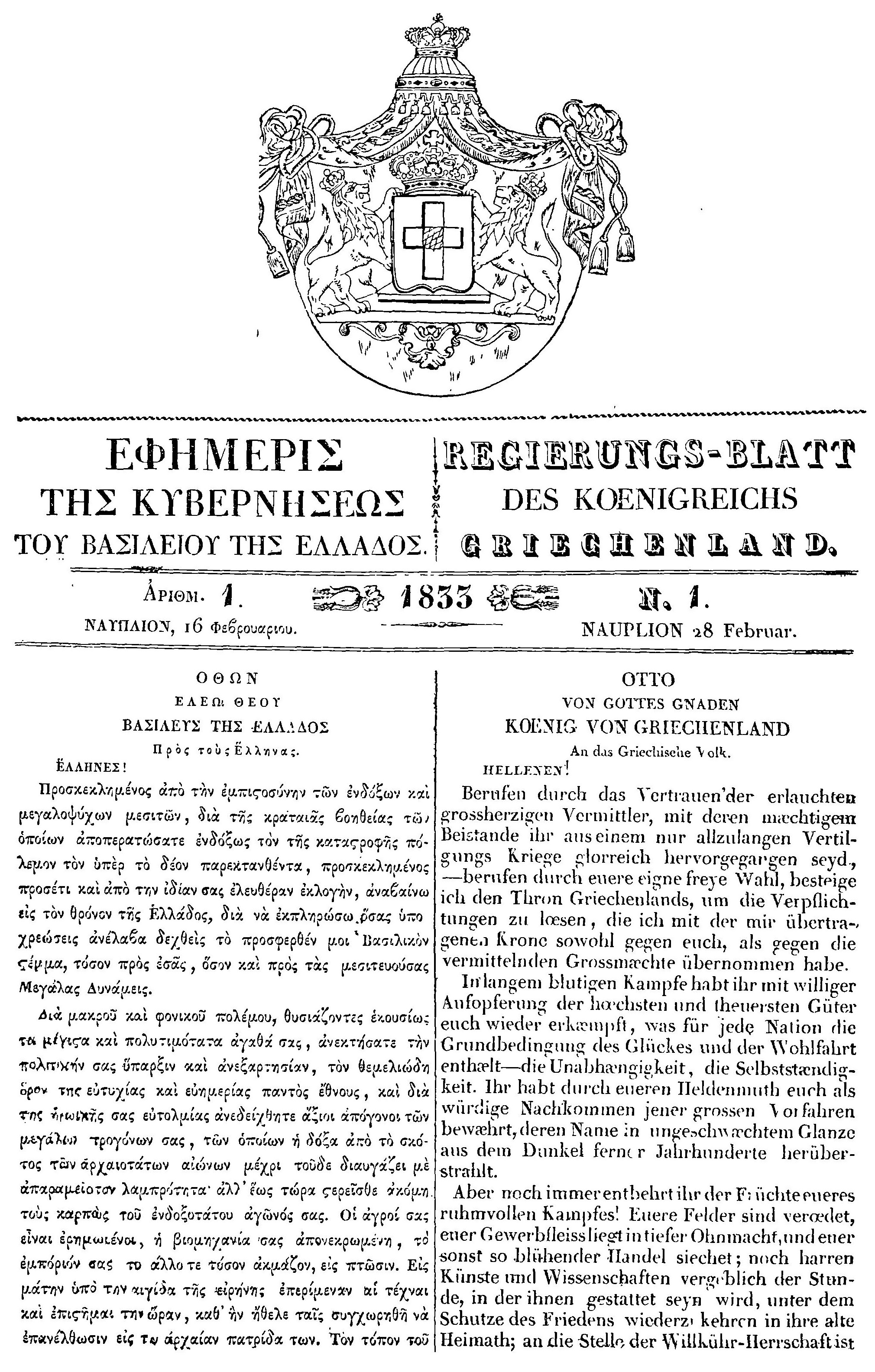
The front page of the first issue with the proclamation of King Otto to the Greek people, 1833

The Government Gazette (Greek: Εφημερίδα της Κυβερνήσεως, romanized: Efimerida this Kyverniseos, lit. 'Government Gazette'; Katharevousa: Ἑφημερίς τῆς Κυβερνήσεως) is the official journal of the Government of Greece which lists all laws passed in a set time period ratified by Cabinet and President. It was first issued in 1833. Until 1835, during the regency on behalf of King Otto, the gazette was bilingual in Greek and German. No law in Greece is valid until its publication in this journal. Foundations, duties, and rights of juridical persons are also published in this journal.

The printed issues of the Government Gazette are sold by the National Printing House of Greece. They can also be searched and downloaded from the official site of the House. An issue of the gazette is called "Government Gazette Issue" (Greek: Φύλλο Εφημερίδας Κυβερνήσεως, romanized: Fyllo Efimeridas Kyverniseos, lit. 'Government Gazette Issue', ΦΕΚ, FEK), Each issue is separated into volumes called «Τεύχος» with distinct roles.

The front page of the issue of Government Gazette (2018)
