= John S. Koliopoulos =

Greek historian (1942–2022)

Ioannis or John S. Koliopoulos (Greek: Ιωάννης Σ. Κολιόπουλος, 1942–2022) was a Greek historian, born in the village of Votani, Kastoria in 1942.

He was the author of Plundered loyalties: Axis occupation and civil strife in Greek West Macedonia, 1941-1949, Brigands with a Cause and other books on Greek history, and co-author of Greece: A Modern Sequel with Thanos Veremis, Professor of Political History at Athens University and President of the board of ELIAMEP.

He was Professor Emeritus of Modern Greek History at Aristotle University of Thessaloniki.
