= Richard Clogg =

British historian

Richard Clogg (born 1939 at Rochdale) is a British historian.

== Life ==
Richard Clogg studied history at the University of Edinburgh, where he graduated as Master in 1963. From 1969 on, he was teaching modern Greek history at King's College London, first as lecturer, then reader, finally from 1988 to 1995 as professor of Balkan history. In 1995, he became senior research fellow as well as fellow of the governing board of St Antony's College, Oxford.

== Work ==
Clogg's best-known work A Concise History of Greece (1992) set new standards in the field, was translated into several languages, and was awarded with the Runciman Award in 1993. Clogg himself was decorated with the Gold Cross of the Greek Order of Honour by the President of Greece in 2002.

== Publications ==
=== As author ===
- Parties and elections in Greece. The search for legitimacy, Durham: Duke University Press 1987.
- A short History of modern Greece, Cambridge: Cambridge University Press 1979.
- (with Mary Jo Clogg) Greece, Oxford: Clio 1980.
- A concise History of Greece, Cambridge: Cambridge University Press 1992 (²2002).
- Anatolica. Studies in the Greek east in the 18th and 19th centuries, Aldershot: Variorum 1996.
  - I kath'imas Anatoli. Studies in Ottoman Greek history, Istanbul: Isis Press 2004.
- Minorities in Greece. Aspects of a plural society, London: Hurst 2002.

=== As editor ===
- The Correspondence of Adhamantios Korais with Thomas Burgess 1789-1792, Vienna: Österreichische Akademie der Wissenschaften 1969.
- The struggle for Greek independence. Essays to mark the 150. anniversary of the Greek War of Independence, London: Macmillan 1973.
- (with Phyllis Auty) British policy towards wartime resistance in Yugoslavia and Greece, London: Macmillan 1975.
- The movement for Greek independence, 1770-1821. A collection of documents, London: Macmillan 1976.
- Greece in the 1980s, London: Macmillan 1980.
- Balkan society in the age of Greek independence, London: Macmillan 1981.
- The Greek diaspora in the twentieth century, Basingstoke: Macmillan 1999.
- Greece 1940-1949. Occupation, resistance, civil war. A documentary history, Basingstoke et alib.: Palgrave Macmillan 2002.
- Bearing gifts to Greeks. Humanitarian aid to Greece in the 1940s, Basingstoke: Palgrave Macmillan 2008.
