= 2024 in archaeology =

This page lists significant events of 2024 in archaeology.

== Finds ==
=== January ===
- 4 – A rock-cut tomb dating back to the Second Dynasty was uncovered in Saqqara by a team of Japanese and Egyptian archaeologists. The tomb contained artifacts from various periods, spanning over the Late Period, the Ptolemaic period, and the 18th Dynasty. Among the findings were remains of an adult with a colored mask and a small child, in addition to two terracotta statues depicting Isis and Harpocrates.
- 11 –
  - The Upano Valley sites were discovered as the oldest known complex Amazonian society, predating other such societies by over a millennium. They are located in the Upano River valley in eastern Ecuador, and are a cluster of archaeological sites in the Amazon rainforest. The sites comprise several cities; they are believed to have been inhabited as early as 500 BC.
  - Discovery of a 1st-century A.D. Roman villa in Bacoli during the works for the new public park, likely belonged to Pliny the Elder.
- 13 – Two Doric Greek temples discovered in Paestum.

=== February ===
- 1 – The discovery of 13 Homo sapiens bone fragments, dating back approximately 47,500 years and identified through ancient DNA, was announced near Ranis, Germany. This research has provided new insights into the arrival of modern humans in Northwestern Europe, indicating they arrived earlier than previously thought.
- 20 – Discovery of the ruins of the medieval church of San Geminiano and rectangular stone-lined tombs dated to the seventh or eighth century under Piazza San Marco in Venice during stone paving restoration works was announced.
- A storm uncovered timbers from a shipwreck on Sanday, Orkney, Scotland, subsequently identified as almost certainly the British whaler Earl of Chatham, built as frigate HMS Hind (1749), and wrecked in 1788.

=== March ===
- 4 –
  - A 1,200-year-old tomb of the Gran Coclé culture containing the remains of an elite lord, as many as 31 sacrificial victims, and gold artifacts has been discovered in Panama's El Caño Archaeological Park.
  - The top half of a statue of Ramesses II was found in an archaeological site at the ancient city of Hermopolis, now Al-Ashmunin, Egypt.
- 7 – The discovery of approximately seven thousand human bones along with grave goods, as well as a Bronze Age human skull with a hole likely created through a procedure called trepanation, was announced in Cova dels Xaragalls, Spain.
- 8 – A piece of bread dating back to 6,800 BC was found in Konya, Turkey, at the site of the Neolithic site of Çatalhöyük. This is believed to be the world's oldest known bread. It was found in a destroyed oven structure in the "Mekan 266" area. Archaeologists also found wheat, barley, pea seeds, and a round "spongy" residue.
- 11 – Discovery of a 1,800 year old marble head of Apollo by Aristotle University of Thessaloniki in Philippi was announced.
- 20 – A piece of a medieval leaden papal bull was discovered by members of the Saint Cordula Exploration Association near Wysoka Kamieńska, Poland.
- 25 – A 12th-century grave containing 170 silver bracteates are found at the site of the Christian church of Brahekyrkan on Visingsö, Sweden. The excavation also uncovered 24 graves and 20 hearths, dating back to at least the Roman Iron Age.
- 29 – A partially complete set of 17th century Hussar armor is discovered in the village of Mikułowice, Poland. The set will go on display at the Castle Museum in Sandomierz after inspection and conservation.
- 30 – A mediaeval settlement and Roman furnaces with more than 150 objects were discovered in Rimavská Sobota, Slovakia.

=== April ===
- 1 – A submerged late Bronze Age fort was uncovered on an island in Clew Bay, located off the north Mayo coast of Ireland.
- 2 – An 8,200-year-old campsite known as Gomolak Overlook was discovered on Holloman Air Force Base in southern New Mexico.
- 3 – 640-year-old castle Château de l'Hermine, built by John IV the Conqueror in the 1380s, is discovered under the courtyard of Hotel Lagorce in Vannes, Brittany, France.
- 5 – A 4.5 m (15 ft) by 3 m (9.8 ft) Mycenaean building along with over 30 ceramic vessels were uncovered on the summit of Mount Ellanio on the Greek island of Aegina. The ceramic vessels were dated back to the Mycenaean palatial period, between 1200 and 1050 BC.
- 7 – 30 unmarked graves were found outside the William P. Johnston Memorial Cemetery, a previously colored cemetery, in Graham, Texas.
- 8 – Archaeologists found a 7th-century hermitage of Guthlac and his sister Pega, which stands on the site of a much older henge dating back to between 1502 and 1323 BCE.
- 11 –
  - Roman frescos depicting mythical Greek figures such as Helen of Troy and Apollo and Cassandra are found in a new excavation in Pompeii, Italy.
  - A bronze fitting belonging to a shield, depicting Alexander the Great, was found on Zealand island in Denmark. It is being examined and analyzed at the Museum Vestsjælland on the island.
  - A collection of glassware dating back to the Roman period was uncovered in Nîmes, France. Nîmes was known as Nemausus in antiquity and emerged as a Roman colony during the 1st century BC. The collection includes strigils, ornate glass vases, ceramics, a glass paste cup, lamps, and fragments of funerary monuments and amphorae.
- 12 – A shoe buckle, musket balls, and grapeshot were uncovered in Scotland at the site of the 1746 Battle of Culloden. The buckle is thought to have belonged to Donald Cameron of Lochiel, the hereditary chief of Clan Cameron and a Jacobite.
- 16 – Three ancient Roman graves dating to the 5th or 6th century AD were found in the ancient Roman city of Ossónoba, in what is now Faro, Portugal. The graves were sealed with limestone labs, believed to be reused parts from older buildings in the area. The graves are of a man between the ages of 39 and 45 years old, a woman under the age of 25, and a baby under six months old. Archaeologists also recovered other Roman artifacts near the graves: ceramics, a bone dice, nails, pins, a spoon, evidence of a dye factory, and coins minted between A.D. 306–307.
- 18 – Archaeologists discover a horseshoe-shaped monument and a collection of weapons and ornaments dating back to the Neolithic at a site in Marliens, France.
- 19 – A 2,500-year-old Greek-Illyrian helmet was discovered at the "Gomila" site in Zakotorac, Pelješac Peninsula, Croatia.
- 25 – A papyrologist at the University of Pisa finds information about Plato's burial place in the Herculaneum papyri.
- 28 – Two glass bottles containing a mysterious liquid are found at George Washington's Mount Vernon estate in Virginia, United States. Experts believe the bottles were originally filled with cherries and were placed in the ground to refrigerate between 1758 and 1776.

=== May ===
- 1 –
  - A stone sculpture dating back to the 16th or 17th century belonging to a Paulist missionary was found in Panaji, Goa state, India.
  - A 7,000-year-old Late Neolithic settlement is uncovered near the Timiš River, Banat, northeastern Serbia. The area covers roughly 11 to 13 hectares and is surrounded by up to six ditches. The settlement is associated with the Vinča culture, dating back to between 5400 and 4400 BC.
- 2 – Five human skeletons missing their hands and feet are found underneath a house that belonged to Nazi leader Hermann Goering, in Gierłoż, Poland. The remains are of a baby, a 10-year-old child, and three adults. One of the skeletons had a deformed jaw and a twisted spine.
- 5 – A medieval village is discovered in Kaiserpfalz, Saxony-Anhalt, Germany, near the site of the Memleben Abbey monastery. So far, the discovery includes two buildings, a church, and a residential building.
- 11 – A Roman service station along with artefacts dating back to 12,000 years are found in the Cotswolds, England. The artefacts include a Cupid figurine, a nail cleaner, pottery, coins, and jewelry. The pieces will go on display at an event at the Gloucester Guildhall.
- 20 – An Egyptian-Japanese archaeological team has discovered a pair of underground structures near the Great Pyramid of Giza. Using ground-penetrating radar and electrical resistivity tomography, they identified a shallow L-shaped structure measuring 10 meters wide by 15 meters long.
- 22 – Tiburon Subsea CEO Tim Taylor and the Lost 52 Project announce that they have discovered the wreck of submarine USS Harder (SS-257) (sunk 1944) largely intact in the South China Sea near the Philippines' northern island of Luzon.
- 31 – Discovery of the 2,000-year-old crescent-shaped gold earrings, arrowheads, and a large, bronze mirror discovered in the Turkistan region of Kazakhstan by the archaeologists from Ozbekali Zhanibekov University and the Turkistan Regional Administration.

=== June ===
- 7 – Discovery at Pompeii of a shrine with rare blue-painted walls covered with paintings of females thought to represent the four seasons (Horae) was announced. 15 amphorae, two bronze jugs and two bronze lamps were among the findings. The 8 sq.m. room is thought to be a sacrarium (the sanctuary of a church).
- 11 – The Greek Ministry of Culture announces the discovery of the Papoura Hill Circular Structure, a large Bronze Age-era Minoan architectural construction used between 2000 and 1700 BC in Kasteli, Crete.
- 12 – Discovery of the ship Quest (on which Antarctic explorer Ernest Shackleton died in 1922) where she sank off Newfoundland and Labrador in 1962 is announced.
- 12 – The discovery of eight 13th-century stone catapult shots outside the walls of Kenilworth Castle was announced. The stones are believed to date back to the reign of King Henry III.
- 13 – A historic settlement and cemetery of at least 52 individuals with more than 18,800 artefacts have been uncovered by Border Archaeology at Calthorpe Gardens, in Bretch Hill, Banbury, Oxfordshire.
- 15 – Discovery of a large Roman necropolis containing more than 250 burials of infants, stillborn babies and grave goods was announced by the French National Institute for Preventive Archaeological Research in Place du Maréchal Leclerc, Auxerre, France. Some remains were buried in ceramic vessels and wooden coffins, while others were wrapped in textiles.
- 19 –
  - Identification of a lost Assyrian military camp from circa 700 B.C which was detailed in the Hebrew Bible was announced by an independent researcher Stephen Compton by creating a virtual map to specify the site of the camp.
  - University of Córdoba (Spain) announced the discovery of a 2,000-year-old white wine in a glass funerary urn in a tomb in Carmona, Andalusia, Spain. The urn also contained the skeletal remains of two men.
- 20 – Discovery of 3,500-year-old bones of infants and adults, along with a variety of pottery remains, in the Cave of the Dead Man, Spain was announced by the Autonomous University of Barcelona.
- 20 – Discovery of the remains of a Viking ship with numerous rivets and two horse crampons was announced using a penetrating radar at Jarlsberg Manor in Norway.
- 21 – Discovery of an 18th-century brass ring which is commonly known as "Jesuit Rings" at historic Michigan fort was announced. The ring was uncovered among 1781 demolition rubble at House E of the museum's Southeast Rowhouse.
- 21 – The Israel Antiquities Authority (IAA) announced the discovery of a well-preserved shipwreck dating back 3,300 years. The wreck, found about 90 kilometers (55 miles) off Israel's Mediterranean coast at a depth of 1,800 meters (1.1 miles), contained hundreds of intact Canaanite jugs used for transporting wine, food oils, fruit, and other goods across the Mediterranean.
- 21 – Archaeologists announce the discovery of six 9,000-year-old stone sewing needles in expeditions near the shore of Lake Xiada Co in western Tibet, making them the oldest stone tools made via grinding on the Tibetan Plateau.
- 22 – Discovery of a 5,300-year-old burial mound with several graves and grave offerings was announced by the archaeologists from the University of Hradec Králové. This finding was made during a recent highway construction project northeast of Prague, Czechia. The mound measured approximately 190 meters in length and up to 15 meters in width.
- 23 – Discovery of a Golden Primrose flower decoration along with at least seven large wall remains at Auckland Castle was announced by the archaeologists from the Auckland Project.
- 24 – An archaeological mission combining Egyptian and Italian efforts announced the discovery of 33 Graeco-Roman family tombs, which were uncovered early that month, near the Mausoleum of Aga Khan on the west bank of Aswan.
- 26 – Discovery of a 1,500-year-old ivory reliquary pyx beneath the marble altar was announced in southern Austria by the University of Innsbruck.
- 28 – Archaeological Institute of America announced the discovery of a stone wall and Roman defensive ditch in the Dossone della Melia forest, Calabria, Italy, containing numerous broken iron weapons, sword handles and some metal remains. The wall is believed to have been built by Roman general Marcus Licinius Crassus to contain the slave rebellion leader Spartacus and his forces.

=== July ===
- 3 – Scientists announced the discovery of the world's oldest cave painting, depicting three people gathered around a large red pig, estimated to be at least 51,200 years old, in Leang Karampurang cave in the Maros-Pangkep region, South Sulawesi, Indonesia.
- 4 – The National Trust has announced the discovery of two large Roman villas with cemeteries and numerous early Iron Age farmsteads at the Attingham Park estate in Shropshire, United Kingdom, using ground scanning technology.
- 6 – Discovery of a well-preserved 2-meter-tall marble statue depicting the Greek god Hermes near the village of Rupite in Bulgaria was announced.
- 7 – Discovery of the 3.500 year-old dining room with lots of ceramic remains was announced in Tava Tepe in Agstafa, Azerbaijan by the archaeologists from the University of Catania and the National Academy of Sciences of Azerbaijan.
- 8 – Bulgarian archaeologists discovered, at the site of the ancient city of Heraclea Sintica, a well-preserved, marble statue depicting the Greek god Hermes.
- 9 – The discovery of a 4,000-year-old ceremonial temple and a theater with a huge stone depicting a mythological bird figure was announced at the archaeological site La Otra Banda, Cerro Las Animas, in Peru.
- 14 – Archaeologists announced the discovery of an ancient city, the capital of the Kimak Khaganate, including a Kimak chariot, a necropolis from the Golden Horde era near the Irtysh River in present-day Pavlodar Region.
- 17
  - Archaeologists unearthed remains of a medieval papal palace in the square outside the Archbasilica of Saint John Lateran in Rome, Italy.
  - A joint French-Egyptian archaeological mission from the Supreme Council of Antiquities and Paul Valéry University uncovered stelae, inscriptions, and miniature images of Pharaohs Amenhotep III, Thutmose IV, Psamtik II, and Apries beneath the Nile waters in Aswan. These artifacts were initially discovered during the Nubian Monuments Rescue Campaign in the 1960s.
- 23 – Egypt's Ministry of Tourism and Antiquities announced the discovery of 63 tombs at Tal al-Deir in Damietta. These tombs contained funerary amulets and ushabti statues dating back to the 26th Dynasty, as well as 38 bronze coins found within a ceramic vase from the Ptolemaic era.
- 24
  - Polish divers announced the discovery of a 19th-century shipwreck in the Baltic Sea, 37 kilometres (23 mi) off the coast of Öland, Sweden, containing crates of champagne from the French producer Louis Roederer, porcelain, and clay bottles of mineral water from the German brand Selters.
  - LiDAR technology unveiled a Roman-era circus in Iruña-Veleia, Spain, where 5,000 spectators once watched horse-drawn chariot races.
- 31 – The Lublin Voivodeship Conservator of Monuments announced the discovery of a cache of 2nd and 3rd-century Roman silver denarii and jewelry near Księżpol, Poland, uncovered by metal detectorists and providing evidence of an undocumented ancient trade site.

=== August ===
- 3 – A pebble mosaic floor dated back to the mid-4th century BC was unearthed in Eretria, Euboea, Greece.
- 6 – Discovery of a 3,400-year-old well-preserved clay tomb with two Minoan Bronze Age men was announced on Crete, Greece. The individuals were uncovered with a bowl and 14 ornamented jars, or amphorae.
- 7
  - Results were published from the first archaeological work in space, the Sampling Quadrangle Assemblages Research Experiment (SQuARE) on the International Space Station. The experiment was carried out in early 2022. It documented six sample locations with daily photography by the ISS crew. Two locations were analyzed: a "Maintenance Work Area" (shown by the archaeologists to have been used for storage rather than maintenance), and a wall near exercise equipment and the latrine (where a crew member stored their toiletry kit).
  - Discovery of a 7,000-year-old prehistoric settlement, inhabited by early European farmers was announced by the Archaeological Institute of the Academy of Sciences of the Czech Republic in the Central Bohemian Region of the country. Several longhouses and pits full of Neolithic pottery remains and tools were also revealed during the excavation.
- 13 – Discovery of the stela which describes the founding of an ancient Maya city by the archaeologists from the National Institute of Anthropology and History (INAH) in the Cobá archaeological zone in the eastern Yucatán Peninsula. The stela is over 11 meters long and contains 123 carved hieroglyphics arranged in quadrants. The inscriptions on it reveals the name of a previously unrevealed ruler, K'awiil Ch'ak Chéen.
- 16 – Discovery of the 2,000 year old prehistoric settlement with 16 roundhouse was announced during the construction of a new prison in northeastern Scotland by members of AOC Archaeology Group. A variety of prehistoric artefacts, stone whetstones, pottery and worked flint were also revealed.
- 22 – Archaeologists from the Regional Archaeological Museum in Plovdiv announced the discovery of a well-preserved Thracian temple dated to the third century BCE in Plovdiv, Bulgaria. The 10-metre-long temple is made of dry joints and clay-sand mortar and has 2 rooms.
- 23 – An Egyptian archaeological mission uncovered an astronomical observatory from the 6th century BCE at the Buto Temple, located at the Tell El-Faraeen archaeological site in the Kafr El Sheikh Governorate.
- 23 – Excavations at the Ness of Brodgar Neolithic site in Orkney, Scotland, come to an end after 20 years of archaeological investigations.

=== September ===
- 4 – Discovery of two warrior pit graves cut into the cemetery strata along with the funeral pyre was announced by the archaeologists led by Dr. Marek Florek from the Office for the Protection of Monuments during excavations of an ancient cemetery in Ostrowiec County, Poland. Cremated human remains were uncovered with funerary objects including swords, shield elements, an umbo (shield boss), iron spearheads, and fragments of burnt clay vessels.
- 6
  - The discovery of a 10th-century burial ground was announced by the archaeologists from the Institute of Archaeology of the Russian Academy of Sciences on the eastern bank of the Oka river, Nizhny Novgorod Region, Russia. 8 of the burials contained the remains of four children, two women, and two men. The men's burials were adorned with an ornate collection of grave goods, including arrowheads, a whetstone, bronze bracelets, iron plates, knives and a bronze buckle.
  - Archaeologists have announced the discovery of human skeletons, bone pits, and personal items at a site on Galgenberg, or Gallows Hill, near Quedlinburg, Germany, which was used for public executions between 1662 and 1809. Archaeologists found a well-preserved male skeleton buried in a wooden coffin with folded hands and a rosary chain, and the other skeleton was buried with large stones placed across its chest.
- 8 – Discovery of a Bronze helm from the 4th century BC, along with 300 Celtic treasures including axes, spearheads, a sword, and decorative horse harness was announced by the State Archaeological Museum in partnership with the University of Warsaw at Łysa Góra in Mazovia, Poland.
- 9
  - Discovery of 2,700 year-old bronze shields from the Urartu kingdom dedicated to Haldi at the site of a temple complex and sanctuary beneath collapsed mudbrick walls was announced by the Archaeology Department of the Atatürk University, Türkiye.
  - The discovery of 5th-century millefiori plaques with depicted flowers in variety of colours and shapes during excavations of ancient Andriake, modern Demre of Antalya, Türkiye, was announced by the archaeologists from the Ministry of Culture and Tourism, working in collaboration with Akdeniz University.
- 16 – Archaeologists from the University of Aberdeen completed further excavations at the Pictish fort in Burghead, Moray, Scotland. A rare Pictish ring was one of the discoveries.
- 22 – Archaeologists from the "Uncovering Roman Carlisle" project announced the discovery of a stone head depicting a woman with a Classical Roman hairstyle from Roman period in Carlisle, England.
- 23 – Scientists discovered more than 300 new Nazca Lines figures in Peru.
- 25 – Scientists found the world's oldest cheese, 3500 years old, buried with mummies in the Tarim Basin, Xinjiang.

=== October ===
- 2 – A joint Egyptian-German archaeological team from Sohag and Berlin Universities have uncovered the burial chamber of a woman named Edi, the daughter of Jifai-Hapi, who served as governor of Asyut in Upper Egypt during the reign of King Senusret I of the 12th dynasty.
- 5 – Archaeologists find the remains of nearly four dozen children in Trujillo, Peru. Historians believe that they belonged to the local Chimu group who may have participated in child sacrifices as an attempt to appease their gods after heavy rains and flooding. The remains of two adults and nine llamas are also found nearby.
- 12 – Archaeologists discover a tomb in Petra, Jordan, with 12 human skeletons and artifacts about 2,000 years old. This discovery is featured by the TV show Expedition Unknown.
- 13 – Christopher Columbus' mortal remains are located in Seville, Spain, forensic scientists confirm using DNA analysis. The same analysis points to a Spanish-Jewish origin for Columbus.
- 14 – Scientists discover fossils of a reptile species, Gondwanax paraisensis, in southern Brazil, that lived 237 million years ago.
- 24 – A richly decorated small house called "The House of Phaedra" was discovered in Pompei.
- 25 – Archaeologists announced to have found the remains of two medieval cities (Tugunbulak and Tashbulak) in the mountains of eastern Uzbekistan, believed to be part of the ancient Silk Road.

=== November ===
- 11 – The excavation of a WWII German soldier’s grave near Grzybek, Poland revealed a multi-period archaeological site containing Mesolithic tools, Neolithic pottery, and Roman to Byzantine coins, highlighting long-term human activity in the area.
- 12 – A team of researchers from Durham University and University of Al-Qadisiyah identified the site of the Battle of al-Qadisiyyah in Iraq using historical texts and 1970s spy satellite images.
- 14 - A 2000 years old knife handle in copper alloy founded in the river Tyne.
- 17 – Kuwaiti and Polish archaeologists uncovered a jewelry workshop at the Bahra 1 site in Kuwait, dating to the Ubaid period.
- 21 – Researchers from the Johns Hopkins University uncovered 4,400-year-old clay cylinders with the oldest known alphabetic writing in a Syrian tomb at Umm el-Marra, predating earlier scripts by 500 years.
- 24 – A joint Egyptian-German team discovered a 167-foot-wide temple pylon at Athribis in Sohag, Egypt, dating back to King Ptolemy VIII.
- 25 – A shipwreck off the coast of Malindi, Kenya, which was initially discovered in 2013, was suggested to be possibly the São Jorge from Vasco da Gama's 1524 voyage, as one of the earliest European shipwrecks in the Indian Ocean.

=== December ===
- 4 – Clay bowls dating back 5,000 years, used to distribute food rations to workers, were discovered at some of the earliest public buildings in Shakhi Kora, Iraqi Kurdistan.
- 6 – A 2,000-year-old tomb of a Roman soldier named "Flaccus" was unearthed at Heerlen, the Netherlands.
- 8 – A foundation deposit containing an abundance of ceremonial and religious artifacts was discovered on the southern side of the temple complex at Taposiris Magna, Egypt.
- 9 – The American Geophysical Union (AGU) announced the discovery of 2,700-year-old structures including a massive villa and royal gardens in Khorsabad, Iraq in a magnetic survey.
- 11 – A 2,500-year-old shipwreck was discovered in the waters of Santa Maria del Focallo at the southern tip of Sicily, Italy.
- 12 – Fragments of sculptures associated with the statue of Hermes were discovered near the Acropolis of Athens, Greece.
- 20 – Two shrines at Nimrud's Ninurta Temple, built 2,600 years ago, were uncovered, revealing artifacts such as a cuneiform-inscribed dais and temple record tablets.
- 26 – A sixth-century sword with a silver-and-gilt hilt was discovered in an Anglo-Saxon burial site at Oare, Kent, United Kingdom.

== Events ==
=== January ===
- 15 – The Ministry of Defence (United Kingdom) use an underwater robotic vehicle to salvage the ship's bell of U.S. Navy destroyer USS Jacob Jones (torpedoed in 1917) off the Isles of Scilly at the request of the U.S. Navy's Naval History and Heritage Command.

=== April ===
- 3 – A Māori cloak made from the feathers of critically endangered kākāpō goes on display at the British Museum.
- 17–21 – The 5th Annual World Cultural Heritage Youth Symposium takes place in Athens, Greece, with the theme "This is my living Heritage!". The symposium brings together students and teachers to engage with the Intangible World Cultural Heritage.
- 21 – The United Kingdom returns 32 gold and silver treasures taken from the Asante Kingdom in what is Ghana today, on a six-year loan. The treasures were taken in the 19th century. 17 items were held at the British Museum and 17 at the Victoria and Albert Museum. The relics will be showcased at the Manhyia Palace Museum in Kumasi, the capital of the Ashanti region.
- 26 – An exhibition honoring the 200-year anniversary of Lord Byron's death opens at the Acropolis Museum in Athens. The exhibition highlights Lord Byron's authentic Sultanic passport and firman, annotated traveler images from the Acropolis and the Parthenon, and excerpts from Byron's poems "The Curse of Minerva" and "Childe Harold's Pilgrimage."

=== May ===
- 3 – The Knaresborough Heritage Centre is launched in Knaresborough, North Yorkshire, England. The centre has been worked on for four years by a large group of volunteers, and features artefacts from the region.
- 5 – Sheikha Bodour bint Sultan bin Muhammad Al Qasimi is named an ambassador of the Faya Palaeolandscape by the Sharjah Archaeology Authority.

=== November ===
- 4–8 – The 2024 World Neolithic Congress is set to take place in Şanlıurfa, Türkiye. The conference brings together discussion of diverse Neolithic formations and provides a platform for comparing increasing Neolithic social complexity in different parts of the world.
- 18 – UNESCO gives enhanced protection to 34 cultural sites in Lebanon in view of the 2024 Lebanon war.

== Deaths ==
- January 7 – William Edward Kettler, 101, American archaeologist, discoverer of prehistoric American Indian village and burial ground
- January 8 – Djabrail Chahkiev, 68, Russian archaeologist, historian and ethnographer
- February 1 – Carlota Sempé, 81, Argentine archaeologist
- April 14 – Yan Wenming, 91, Chinese archaeologist
- April 28 – Petro Tolochko, 86, Ukrainian historian, archaeologist and politician
- May 23 – Sir John Boardman, English classical archaeologist and art historian (born 1927)
- August 1 – Patty Jo Watson, 92, American archaeologist
- October 5 – Timothy Darvill, 66, British archaeologist
- November 24 – Colin Renfrew, 87, British archaeologist

== See also ==
- List of years in archaeology
