= Aga Khan III =

48th imam of the Nizari Isma'ili community

His Highness Aga Khan III GCSI GCMG GCIE GCVO PC
- Muhammad Shah in 1920

48th Hereditary Imam of the Nizari Isma'ilism Muslim
- In office 17 August 1885 – 11 July 1957
- Preceded by: Aga Khan II
- Succeeded by: Aga Khan IV

Permanent President of the All-India Muslim League
- In office 1906–1957
- Preceded by: Khwaja Salimullah (Interim)

President of the League of Nations
- In office 1937–1938
- Preceded by: Tevfik Rüştü Aras
- Succeeded by: Éamon de Valera

Member of the Assembly, League of Nations
- In office 1932–1937

Personal life
- Born: Prince Sultan Muhammad Shah; 2 November 1877 Karachi, Bombay Presidency, British India
- Died: 11 July 1957 (aged 79) Versoix, near Geneva, Switzerland
- Resting place: Mausoleum of Aga Khan, Aswan, Egypt
- Spouse: Shahzadi Begum; Cleope Teresa Magliano; Andrée Joséphine Carron; Om Habibeh Aga Khan (born Yvonne Blanche Labrousse)
- Children: Giuseppe Mahdi Khan; Aly Aga Khan; Sadruddin Aga Khan
- Parents: Aqa Ali Shah (father); Nawab A'lia Shams ol-Moluk (mother)
- Other name: Sultan Mohammad Shah

Religious life
- Religion: Shia Islam
- Denomination: Isma'ilism
- School: Nizari Ismaili
- Lineage: Fatimid

Sir Sultan Muhammad Shah (Note: (Persian: سلطان محمد شاه, romanized: Sulṭān Muḥammad Shāh) (2 November 1877 – 11 July 1957), known as Aga Khan III, (Note: (Persian: آقا خان سوم, romanized: Āqā Khān Suwwūm)) was the 48th imam of the Nizari Ism'aili branch of Shia Islam. He is considered one of the founding fathers of Pakistan, serving as the first permanent president and founder of the All-India Muslim League (AIML). He also served as the first Pro-Chancellor and founder of Aligarh Muslim University from 1920 till 1930.

Shah sought the advancement of Muslims and the protection of Muslim rights in British India. The League, until the late 1930s, was not a large organization but represented landed and commercial Muslim interests as well as advocating for British education during the British Raj. Shah advocated for the recognition of Muslims in India as a distinct political and cultural community, a position that would later align with the principles underlying the two-nation theory. Even after he resigned as president of the AIML in 1912, he still exerted a major influence on its policies and agendas. He was nominated to represent India at the League of Nations in 1932 and served as President of the 18th Assembly of The League of Nations (1937–1938).

== Early life ==
He was born in Karachi, Sindh (now in Pakistan), in British India in 1877 to Aga Khan II (who had emigrated from Qajar Iran) and his third wife, Nawab A'lia Shams ol-Moluk, a granddaughter of Fath-Ali Shah Qajar. After attending Eton College, he studied at the University of Cambridge.

== Career ==
In 1885, at the age of seven, he succeeded his father as Imam of the Shi'a Isma'ili Muslims.

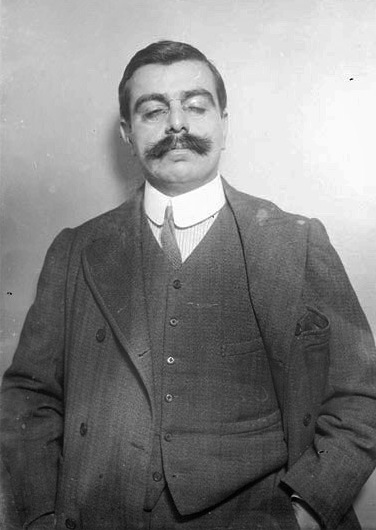
Muhammad Shah in Chicago, 1907 while on a tour of the United States.

The title of the Knight Commander of the Indian Empire (KCIE) was conferred upon him by Queen Victoria in 1897, and he was promoted to Knight Grand Commander (GCIE) in the 1902 Coronation Honours list and invested as such by King Edward VII at Buckingham Palace on 24 October 1902. He was made a Knight Grand Commander of the Order of the Star of India (GCSI) by George V (1912) and appointed a GCMG in 1923. He received recognition for his public services from the German Emperor, the Sultan of Turkey, the Shah of Iran, and other potentates.

In 1906, Shah was a founding member and first president of the All India Muslim League, a political party that pushed for the creation of an independent Muslim nation in the north-west regions of India, then under British colonial rule, and later established the country of Pakistan in 1947.

During the three Round Table Conferences (India) in London from 1930 to 1932, he played an important role in bringing about Indian constitutional reforms. In 1934, he was made a member of the Privy Council.

== Titular leader of the Ismaili Muslims ==
The first half of the 20th century was a period of significant development for the Ismā'īlī community. Numerous institutions for social and economic development were established in the Indian subcontinent and in East Africa.

In India and later Pakistan, social development institutions such as the Diamond Jubilee Trust and Platinum Jubilee Investments Limited were established to support cooperative societies. The Diamond Jubilee High School for Girls was founded in the northern areas of present-day Pakistan, and scholarship programs initiated during the Golden Jubilee were expanded to assist students in need. In East Africa, social and economic development institutions were created, including schools, community centres, and a hospital in Nairobi. Economic initiatives included the Diamond Jubilee Investment Trust (now Diamond Trust of Kenya) and the Jubilee Insurance Company, both listed on the Nairobi Stock Exchange and active in national development.

Shah implemented a series of organisational reforms intended to enable Ismāʿīlī communities to administer their own communal affairs through formal structures and regulations. These were built on the Muslim tradition of a communitarian ethic on the one hand and a responsible individual conscience with the freedom to negotiate one's own moral commitment and destiny on the other. In 1905, he created the first Ismā'īlī Constitution for the social governance of the community in East Africa. The new administration for the community's affairs was organised into a hierarchy of councils at the local, national, and regional levels. The constitution also set out rules in such matters as marriage, divorce, and inheritance, guidelines for mutual cooperation and support among Ismā'īlīs, and their interface with other communities. Similar constitutions were promulgated in India, and all were periodically revised to address emerging needs and circumstances in diverse settings.

In 1905, Shah was involved in the Haji Bibi case, where he was questioned about the origin of his followers. In his rejoinder, in addition to enumerating Ismāʿīlīs in Iran, Russia, Afghanistan, Central Asia, Syria and other places, he claimed that “In Hindustan and Africa there are many Guptis who believe in me… I consider them Shi’i Imami Ismailis; by caste they are Hindus”.

== Religious and social views ==
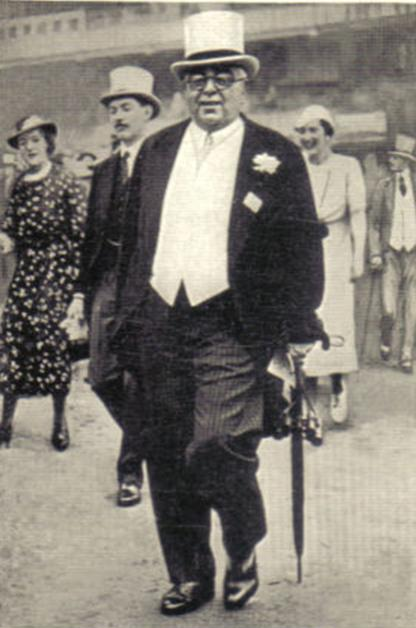
Muhammad Shah in 1936.

Shah was deeply influenced by the views of Sir Sayyid Ahmad Khan. Sir Khan was the founder of what would eventually become the Aligarh Muslim University. Shah later became a supporter of the institution, contributing funds and advocating for its role in Muslim education. Shah himself can be considered an Islamic modernist and an intellectual of the Aligarh movement.

From a religious perspective, Shah followed a modernist approach to Islam. He believed there to be no contradiction between religion and modernity, and supported Muslims in their endeavour to embrace modernity. Although he opposed a wholesale replication of Western society by Muslims, Shah did believe increased contact with the West would be overall beneficial to Muslim society. He was intellectually receptive to Western philosophy and ideas, and believed engagement with them could lead to a revival and renaissance within Islamic thought.

Like several other Islamic modernists of his time, Shah was critical of the traditional religious establishment (the Ulamā), particularly their emphasis on formalism, legalism, and literal interpretations of scripture. Instead, he advocated for renewed ijtihād (independent reasoning) and ijmāʿ (consensus), the latter of which he understood in a modernist way to mean consensus-building. According to him, Muslims should go back to the original sources, especially the Qurʾān, in order to discover the true essence and spirit of Islam. Once the principles of the faith were discovered, they would be seen to be universal and modern. Islam, in his view, had an underlying liberal and democratic spirit. He also called for full civil and religious liberties, peace and disarmament, and an end to all wars.

Shah opposed sectarianism, which he believed sapped the strength and unity of the Muslim community. In specific, he called for a rapprochement between Sunnism and Shīʿism. This view did not imply a belief that religious distinctions would disappear; he continued to emphasize the importance of doctrinal commitment, instructing his Ismāʿīlī followers to remain dedicated to their own teachings. However, he believed in unity through accepting diversity, and by respecting differences of opinion. On his view, there was strength to be found in the diversity of Muslim traditions.

He called for social reform in Muslim society, and he was able to implement them within his own Ismāʿīlī community. Shah argued that Islamic principles supported social justice and the alleviation of poverty, and he advocated for efforts aimed at reducing economic inequality. Like Sir Sayyid Ahmad Khan, Shah was concerned that Muslims had fallen behind the Hindu community in terms of education. He was an advocate for compulsory and universal primary education, and also for the creation of higher institutions of learning.

In terms of women's rights, Shah was more progressive in his views than Sir Sayyid and many other Islamic modernists of his time. Shah advocated for women's rights not solely on the basis of their roles as mothers or wives, but as a matter of individual empowerment and social equity. He endorsed the spiritual equality of men and women in Islam, and he also called for full political equality. This included the right to vote and the right to an education. In regards to the latter issue, he endorsed compulsory primary education for girls. He also encouraged women to pursue higher university-level education, and saw nothing wrong with co-educational institutions. Whereas Sir Sayyid prioritized the education of boys over girls, Shah instructed his followers that if they had a son and daughter, and if they could only afford to send one of them to school, they should send the daughter over the boy.

Shah campaigned against the institution of purda and zenāna, which he felt were oppressive and un-Islamic institutions. He completely banned the purda and the face veil for his Ismāʿīlī followers. Shah also restricted polygamy in his community, encouraged marriage to widows, and banned child marriage. He also made marriage and divorce laws more equitable to women.

Today, the Ismāʿīlī community maintains a network of institutions focused on education, healthcare, and economic development, many of which were established during or after the tenure of Shah.

== Racehorse ownership and equestrianism ==
Muhammad Shah and his horse Blenheim, ridden by Wragg, winner of the Epsom Derby (4 June 1930)

He was an owner of Thoroughbred racing horses, including a record equaling five winners of The Derby (Blenheim, Bahram, Mahmoud, My Love, Tulyar) and a total of sixteen winners of British Classic Races. Shah was a British flat racing Champion Owner thirteen times. According to Ben Pimlott, biographer of Queen Elizabeth II, Shah presented the British monarch with a filly called Astrakhan, who won at Hurst Park Racecourse in 1950.

In 1926, Shah gave a cup (the Aga Khan Trophy) to be awarded to the winners of an international team show jumping competition held at the annual horse show of the Royal Dublin Society in Dublin, Ireland, every first week in August. It attracts competitors from all of the main show jumping nations and is carried live on Irish national television.

== Marriages and children ==
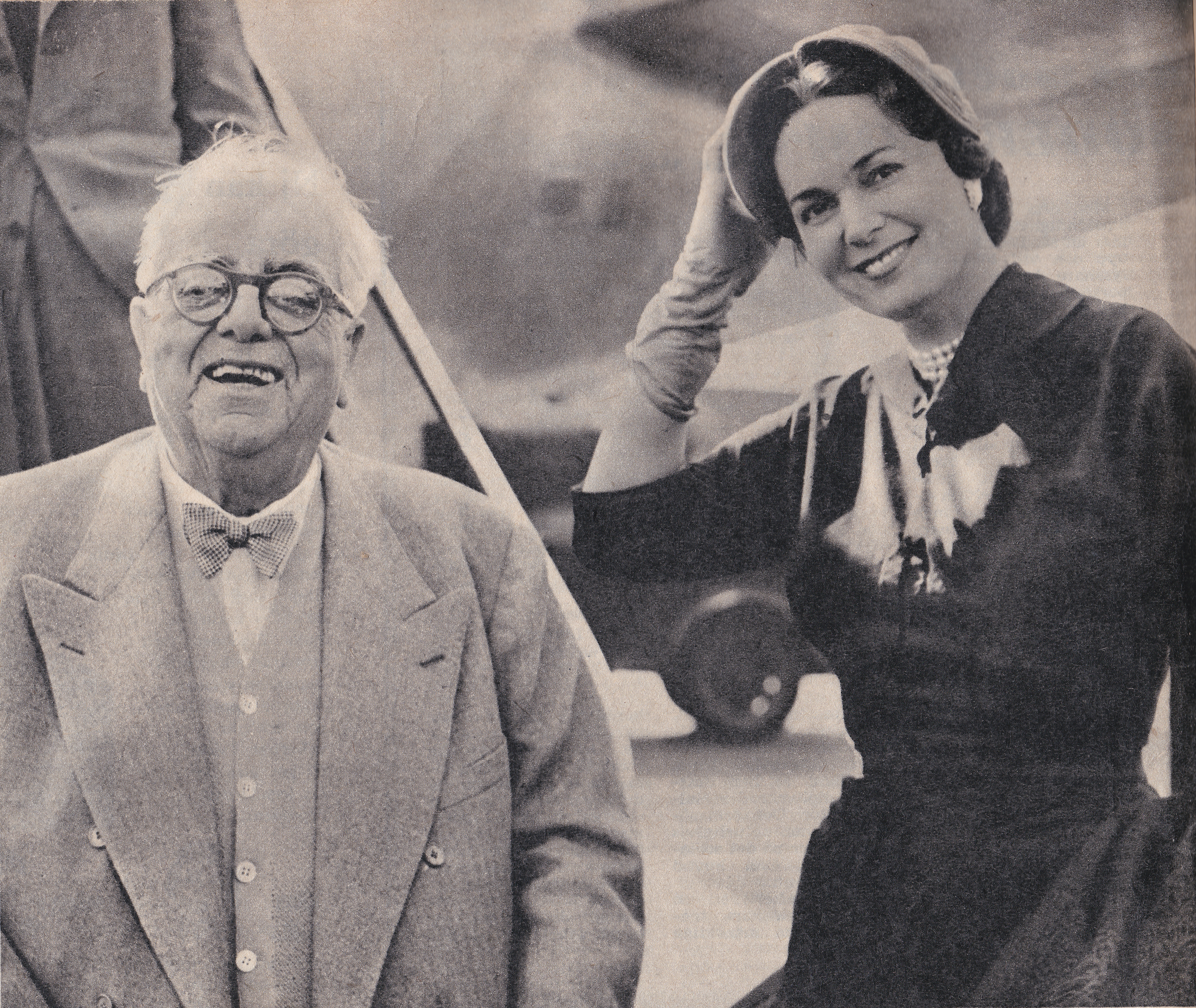
Muhammad Shah and Yvonne, 1954.

- He married, on 2 November 1896, in Pune, India, Shahzadi Begum, his first cousin and a granddaughter of Aga Khan I. She was the daughter of Aga Jungi Shah (1835–1896; the second son of Aga Khan I) and a sister of Captain Aga Abdul Samad Shah al-Hussaini, a British intelligence agent in Chini-Bagh, Kashgar.
- He married in 1908, Cleope Teresa Magliano (1888–1926). They had two sons: Giuseppe Mahdi Khan (d. February 1911) and Aly Khan (1911–1960). She died in 1926, following an operation on 1 December 1926.
- He married, on 7 December 1929 (civil), in Aix-les-Bains, France, and 13 December 1929 (religious), in Bombay, India, Andrée Joséphine Carron (1898–1976). A co-owner of a dressmaking shop in Paris, she became known as Andrée Aga Khan. By this marriage, he had one son, Sadruddin Aga Khan (1933–2003). The couple divorced in 1943.
- He married, on 9 October 1944, in Geneva, Switzerland, Om Habibeh Aga Khan (Yvonne Blanche Labrousse) (15 February 1906 – 1 July 2000).

=== Publications ===
He authored several books and papers, including India in Transition (1918), which broached the subject of the political conditions in pre-Partition India, and his autobiography, The Memoirs of Aga Khan: World Enough and Time (1954). In his book India in Transition, Shah proposed the idea of a South Asiatic Federation in which India would be reorganized into autonomous states within a federal framework. His proposal was among the early detailed plans advocating federalism in colonial India.

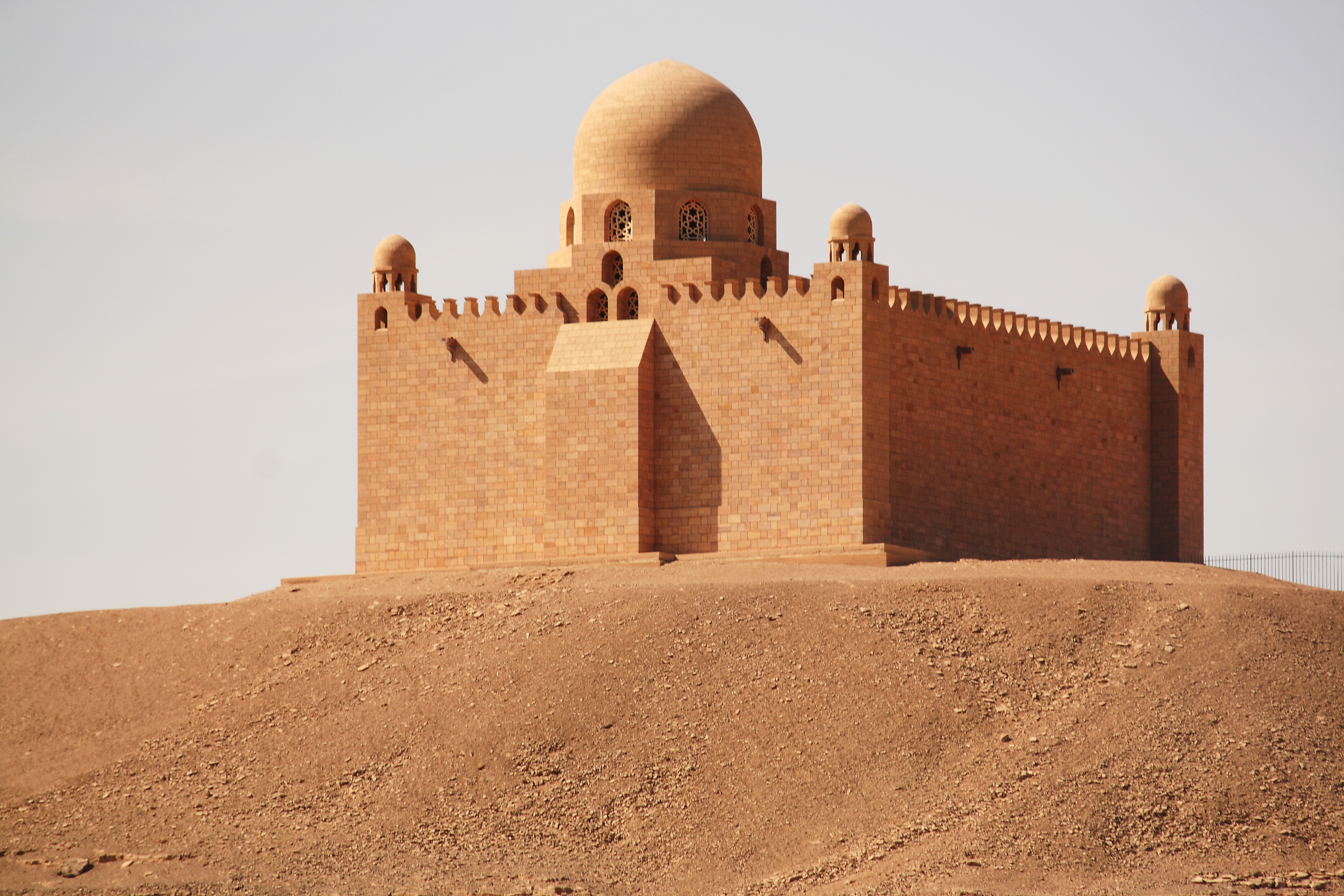
Muhammad Shah's mausoleum in Aswan, Egypt.

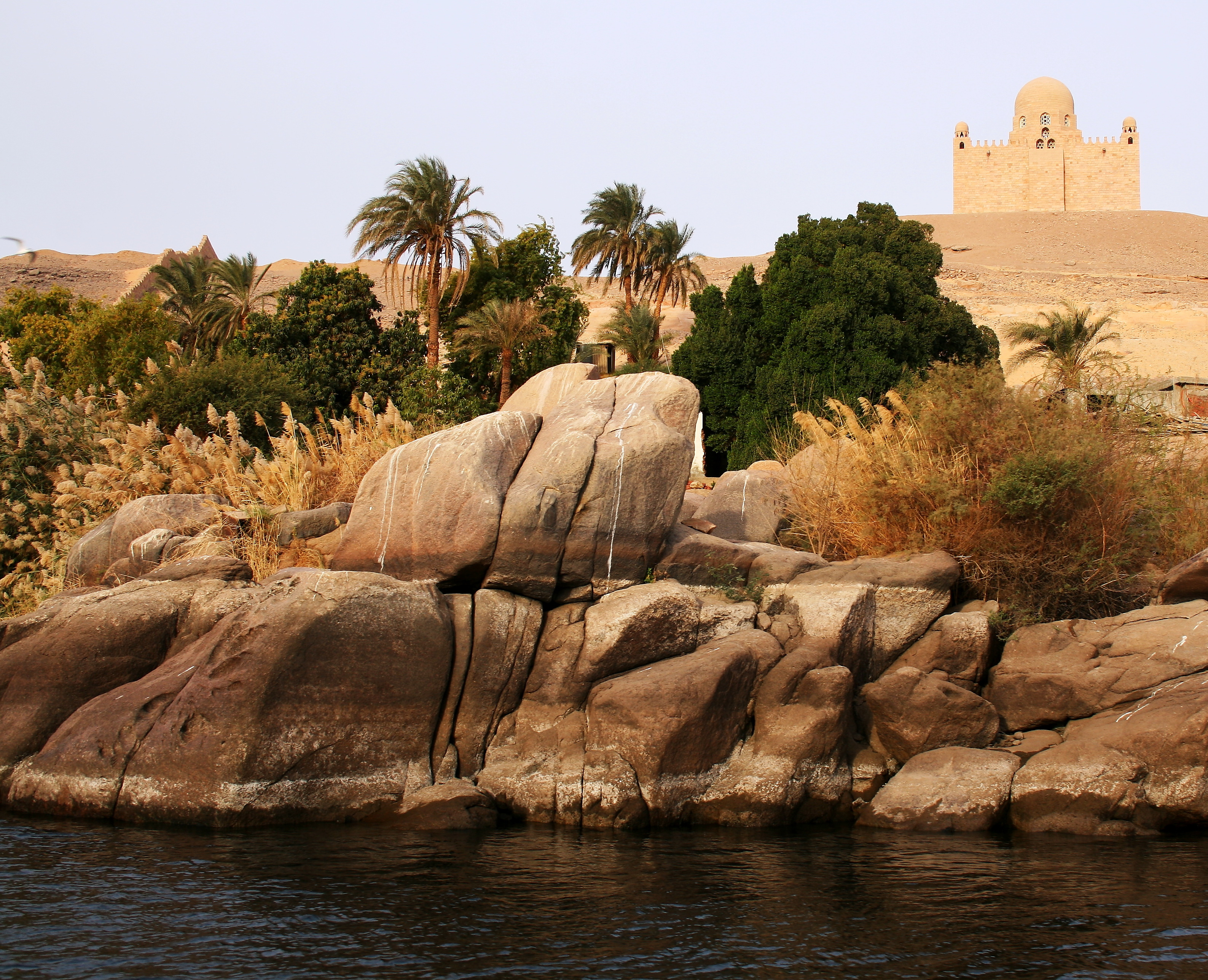
Mausoleum of Muhammad Shah on the Nile.

== Death and succession ==
Shah was succeeded by his grandson, Karim al-Husseini, who became the 49th Imam of the Nizari Ismaili Muslims and assumed the title Aga Khan IV. At the time of his death on 11 July 1957, he was surrounded by his family members in Versoix. His last words were repeating the verses of the Quran.

On 12 July, a solicitor brought Shah's will from London to Geneva and read it before the family:

"Ever since the time of my ancestor Ali, the first Imam, that is to say over a period of thirteen hundred years, it has always been the tradition of our family that each Imam chooses his successor at his absolute and unfettered discretion from amongst any of his descendants, whether they be sons or remote male issue and in these circumstances and in view of the fundamentally altered conditions in the world in very recent years due to the great changes which have taken place including the discoveries of atomic science, I am convinced that it is in the best interest of the Shia Muslim Ismailia Community that I should be succeeded by a young man who has been brought up and developed during recent years and in the midst of the new age and who brings a new outlook on life to his office as Imam.
For these reasons, I appoint my grandson Karim, the son of my own son, Aly Salomone Khan to succeed to the title of Aga Khan and to the Imam and Pir of all Shia Ismailian followers.
I desire that my successor shall, during the first seven years of his Imamat, be guided on questions of general Imamat Policy, by my said wife, Yvette called Yve Blanche Labrousse Om Habibeh, the Begum Aga Khan, who has been familiar for many years with the problems facing my followers, and in whose wise judgment, I place the greatest confidence. I warn my successor to the Imamat, never to do anything during his Imamat that would reduce the responsibility of the Imam for the maintenance of the true Shia Imami Ismaili faith, as developed historically from the time of my ancestor Ali, the founder until my own."

He was initially buried in Versoix, Switzerland before being exhumed and reburied in the Mausoleum of Aga Khan, on the Nile in Aswan, Egypt (at 24.088254°N 32.878722°E) on 20 February 1959.

== Legacy ==
Pakistan Post issued a special "Birth Centenary of Agha Khan III" postage stamp in his honor in 1977. Pakistan Post again issued a postage stamp in his honor in its 'Pioneers of Freedom' series in 1990.

== Honours ==
- 21 May 1898 Knight Commander of the Order of the Indian Empire, KCIE
- 1901 First Class of the Royal Prussian Order of the Crown – in recognition of the valuable services rendered by His Highness to the Imperial German Government in the settlement of various matters with the Mohammedan population of German East Africa
- 26 June 1902 Knight Grand Commander of the Order of the Indian Empire, GCIE
- 12 December 1911 Knight Grand Commander of the Order of the Star of India, GCSI
- 30 May 1923 Knight Grand Cross of the Royal Victorian Order, GCVO – on the occasion of the King's birthday
- 1 January 1934 Appointed a member of His Majesty's Most Honourable Privy Council by King George V
- 1 January 1955 Knight Grand Cross of the Order of St Michael and St George, GCMG –

== Sources ==
- Brown, Frank Herbert (1922). "Aga Khan III" . In Chisholm, Hugh (ed.). Encyclopædia Britannica (12th ed.). London & New York: The Encyclopædia Britannica Company.
- Daftary, F., The Isma'ilis: Their History and Doctrines, Cambridge University Press, 1990.
- Khoja-Moolji, Shenila. “Redefining Muslim women: Aga Khan III’s reforms for women’s education.” South Asia Graduate Research Journal 20, no. 1, 2011, 69-94.
- Khoja-Moolji, Shenila. Forging the Ideal Educated Girl. The Production of Desirable Subjects in Muslim South Asia. Oakland: University of California Press, 2018.
- Naoroji M. Dumasia, A Brief History of the Aga Khan (1903).
- Aga Khan [III], The Memoirs of Aga Khan: World Enough and Time, London: Cassel & Company, 1954; published the same year in the United States by Simon & Schuster, with a foreword by William Somerset Maugham
- Edwards, Anne (1996). Throne of Gold: The Lives of the Aga Khans, New York: William Morrow, 1996
- Naoroji M. Dumasia, The Aga Khan and His Ancestors, New Delhi: Readworthy Publications (P) Ltd., 2008
- Valliani, Amin; "Aga Khan's Role in the Founding and Consolidation of the All India Muslim League", Journal of the Pakistan Historical Society (2007) 55# 1/2, pp 85–95.

Aga Khan III of the Ahl al-Bayt Banu Hashim Clan of the Banu Quraish Born: 1877 CE Died: 1957 CE
Shia Islam titles
Preceded by Aqa Ali Shah	48th Imam of Nizari Ismailism; 1885–1957	Succeeded by Karim al-Hussayni
