= Kasteli Airport =

Kasteli International Airport Αεροδρόμιο Καστελίου
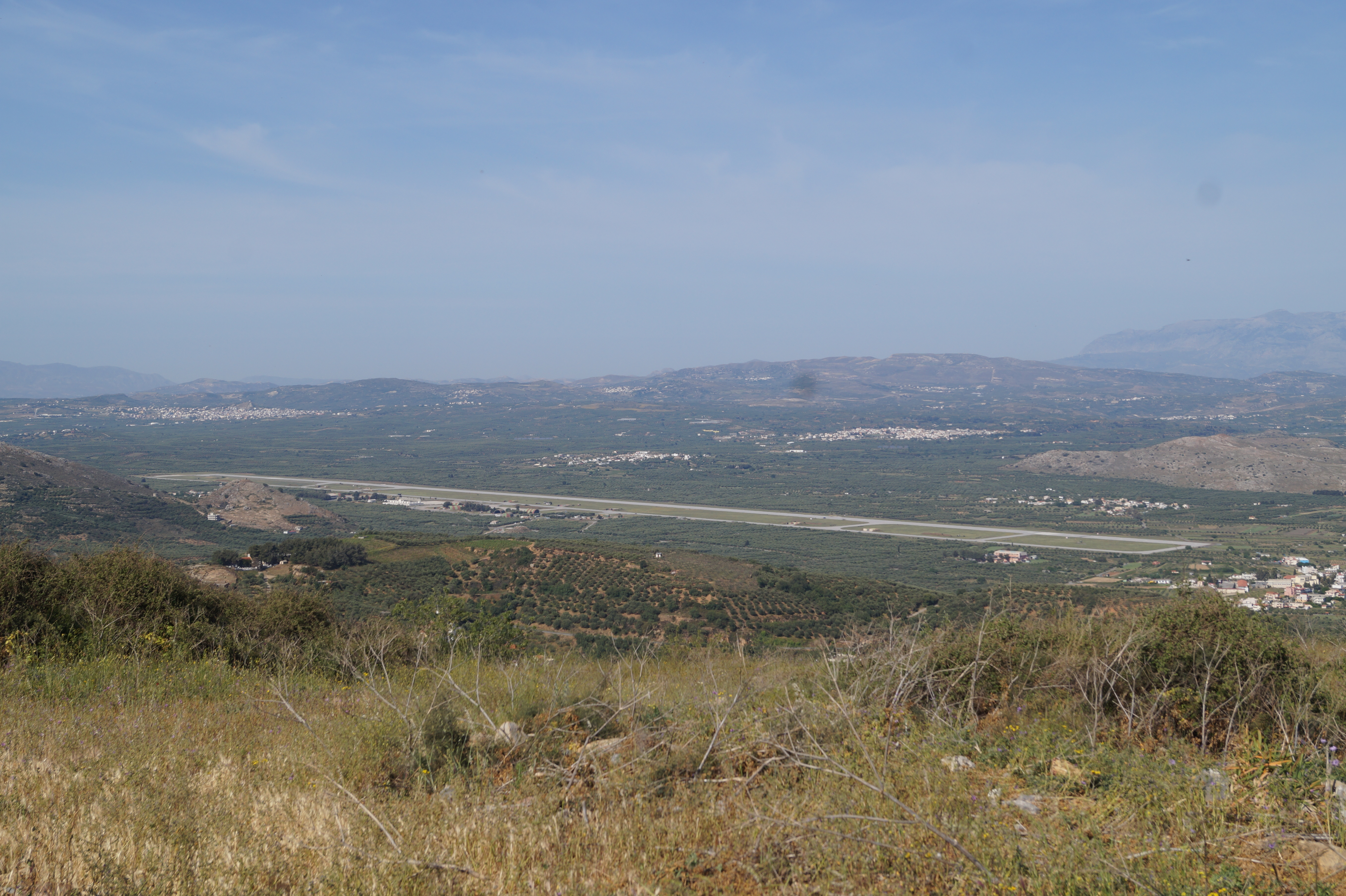
- View from the east
- IATA: none; ICAO: LGTL (Note: The ICAO code is currently shared with the existing air force base north of the facility.)

Summary
- Airport type: Under construction
- Operator: International Airport Heraklion Crete Concession S.A.
- Serves: Heraklion
- Location: Kasteli, Heraklion, Crete, Greece
- Elevation AMSL: 360 m (1,180 ft)
- Coordinates: 35°11′36.40″N 25°19′41.10″E
- Website: www.heraklion-airport.gr/en/the-new-airport

Map
- Location in Greece

Runways
Direction	Length		Surface
Direction	m	ft	Surface
02/20	3,220	10,563	Concrete
- Source: AIP Greece, SkyVector

Kasteli International Airport (IATA: HER, ICAO: LGTL) — also known as the New International Airport of Heraklion, Crete (Νέος Διεθνής Αερολιμένας Ηρακλείου Κρήτης) — is an international airport under construction on the Greek island of Crete. Located in Kasteli, 39 km (24 mi) southeast of Heraklion, this new airport will replace the existing Heraklion International Airport and is expected to open by 2028. Kasteli Hellenic Air Force Base currently operates at this location as a military facility for the Hellenic Air Force, housing F-16 Fighting Falcon fighter aircraft from the 133 Combat Group.

Initially, the new airport will have the capacity to handle nine million local and international passengers per year, with a maximum handling capacity of 18 million passengers annually. The foundation laying ceremony for the project was held in February 2020, marking the official start of construction. The Ariadne Airport Group consortium, which includes GEK Terna in partnership with the Indian GMR Group, is developing, and will operate and manage the new international airport on this site. The airbase will continue to function adjacent to the new airport.

The airport currently features a single operational runway measuring 2,991 m (9,813 ft). A 3,200 m (10,500 ft) runway, capable of handling commercial aircraft such as the Airbus A380, will be built 450 m parallel to the existing military runway.

== History as an Air Force Base ==
Kastelli Airbase was established in November 1940, shortly after the onset of World War II in Greece. Initially constructed by British and Greek technicians, the taxiway was destroyed prior to the Battle of Crete. Following the German occupation in June 1941, the airbase was reconstructed, and a squadron of reconnaissance aircraft was established, using forced labour from the local population. Between 1941 and 1943, the base conducted 200 to 440 sorties per day for German reconnaissance and supply missions to North Africa.

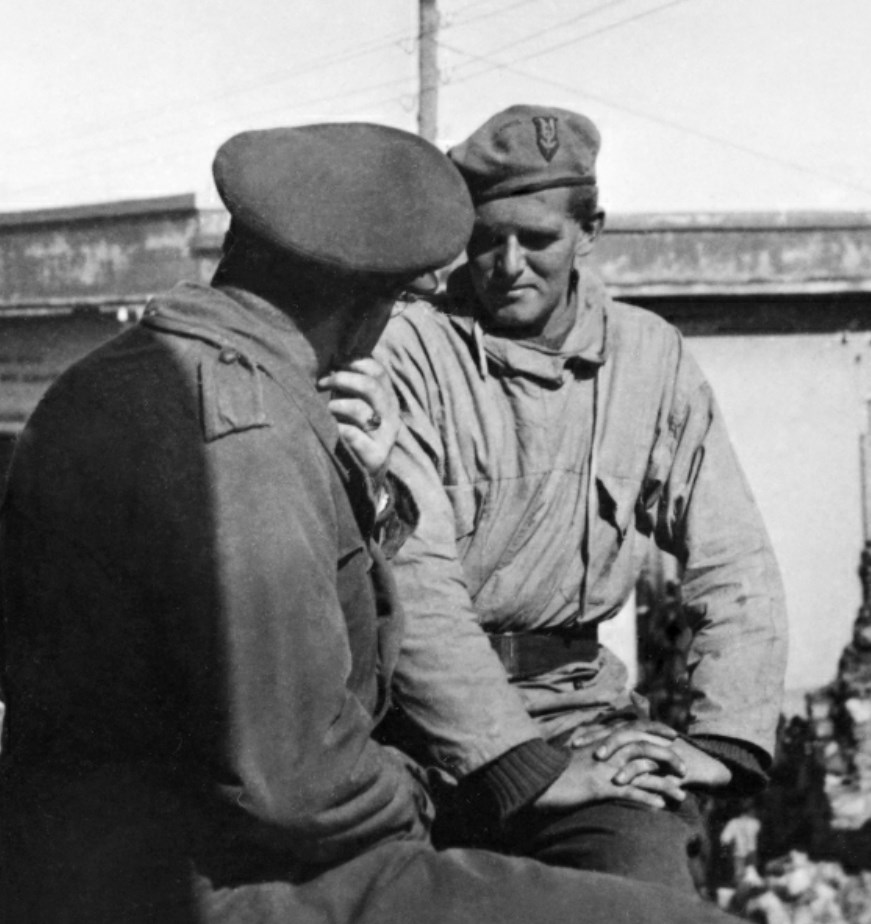
Major Anders Lassen

On 4 July 1943, a British Special Air Service (SAS) raiding party led by Danish military officer Anders Lassen attacked Kastelli Airfield to divert German attention during the Allies' preparations for the invasion of Sicily. The raiders marched over sixty miles across Crete, successfully placing explosives on multiple aircraft before retreating under heavy fire.

After the liberation of Crete in November 1944, the airbase operated as the Air Detachment of the Hellenic Air Force's 115 Combat Wing. From March 1951 to November 1952, the Airforce Construction Unit (MAK) carried out reconstruction and modernisation. In November 1968, the unit became part of the 126 Combat Group.

In July 1974, it was renamed the 133 Combat Group and came under the Hellenic Tactical Air Force Headquarters. It became an independent unit in July 1978, primarily hosting F-84, A-7, and F-4 aircraft until 1986. From June 1995 to 1997, the 206 Air Force Infrastructure Wing oversaw the upgrade of the runway and other facilities at the airbase. Today, Kasteli Airbase operates with F-16 aircraft in the Hellenic Air Force.

The airbase remains active and will continue to function adjacent to the newly constructed airport.

== Establishment as a Civilian Airport ==
=== Background ===
The idea for a civilian airport at Kastelli was first introduced in 1986 by then-Prime Minister Andreas Papandreou. Severe overcrowding at Heraklion International Airport has long been an issue for the existing airport, which has operated at 60% over its designed capacity during peak summer months. From 2015 to 2019, the airport handled between 6.1 and 8.1 million passengers annually, consistently exceeding its original design capacity. This has led to dissatisfaction among travellers, with the current airport being ranked among the worst airports in Europe. Strain on its facilities, along with the airport's proximity 5 km (3.1 mi) east of central Heraklion restricts expansion options of the existing airport.

In 2016, the Greek government officially tendered the construction of a relocated Heraklion airport adjacent to Kastelli Air Force Base to address the capacity and expansion issues. The new location almost 40 km from Heraklion, allows for a longer runway, a commercial cone, and a larger passenger terminal designed to accommodate 10-18 million passengers annually.

=== Planning ===
It is planned that the new airport will be situated on the southwestern side of Kasteli Hellenic Air Force Base, from which the air force currently operates F-16 Fighting Falcon jet fighters. The idea was first proposed in 1986 by then-Prime Minister Andreas Papandreou. The project has officially entered the implementation phase, and tenders have been invited. The new airport was planned to become operational in 2014. The existing airport at Heraklion will be closed and an area of 278 ha (690 acres) there will be returned to local communities for a large urban regeneration plan. The creation of the new airport will require new road, water and sanitation works, as well as the transfer of settlements located within the proposed runway zone (Archangelos, Roussochoria). The construction of a 17 km (11 mi) road will connect the airport with the A90 motorway along the north coast of Crete, in the neighbourhood of Chersonissos. When finished, the distance from the city of Heraklion to the new airport will be approximately 40 km (25 mi). Complaints have been filed for lack of a new road linking the new airport to the south coast of Crete.

The new airport will be constructed over an area of 600 ha (1,500 acres), adjacent to the current military airport in Kasteli. It will have a runway 3,200 m (10,500 ft) long to accommodate larger aircraft than can presently be operated into Heraklion airport. An additional area of 22 hectares (54 acres) is reserved for commercial activity south-west of the new airport. This is a very large project with a budget of €1.2 billion for construction costs alone, and together with purchase costs including loans and other expenses, will reach €1.5 billion.

Initially, four candidates had appeared for the Kasteli airport construction and management project, from Greece, China, France and Spain.

- China State Construction Engineering Corp. with the firm Archirodon and Zürich Airport.
- Aktor is in a second consortium with France-based Vinci.
- J&P Avax teamed up with Bouygues and Aéroports de Paris.
- GEK Terna in partnership, initially, with the Spanish Grupo ACS and later with Indian GMR Airports.

However, the Ariadne Airport Group consortium was declared the provisional winner of the international tender in May 2017. Ariadne is a joint venture formed by Greece-based Terna and New Delhi-headquartered GMR Airports. According to the Greek Secretary General of the Ministry of Infrastructure and Transport, Mr. Giorgos Dedes, €10 million have been approved for expropriations and the contract for the airport has been approved by the Court of Auditors, so that infrastructure works can begin in January 2019, even if there are great concerns about the environmental pollution from airplane fumes to the underground water deposits that provide water to 1/4 of the city of Heraklion. On February 21, 2019, the Ministry of Infrastructure and Transport signed a concession allowing the Greek-Indian Ariadne Airport Group consortium to build the airport. The concession needs clearance from Parliament and competition authorities before construction begins. In May 2019, the Parliament approved by a wide majority the necessary legislation, ratifying the concessions contract.

=== Construction ===
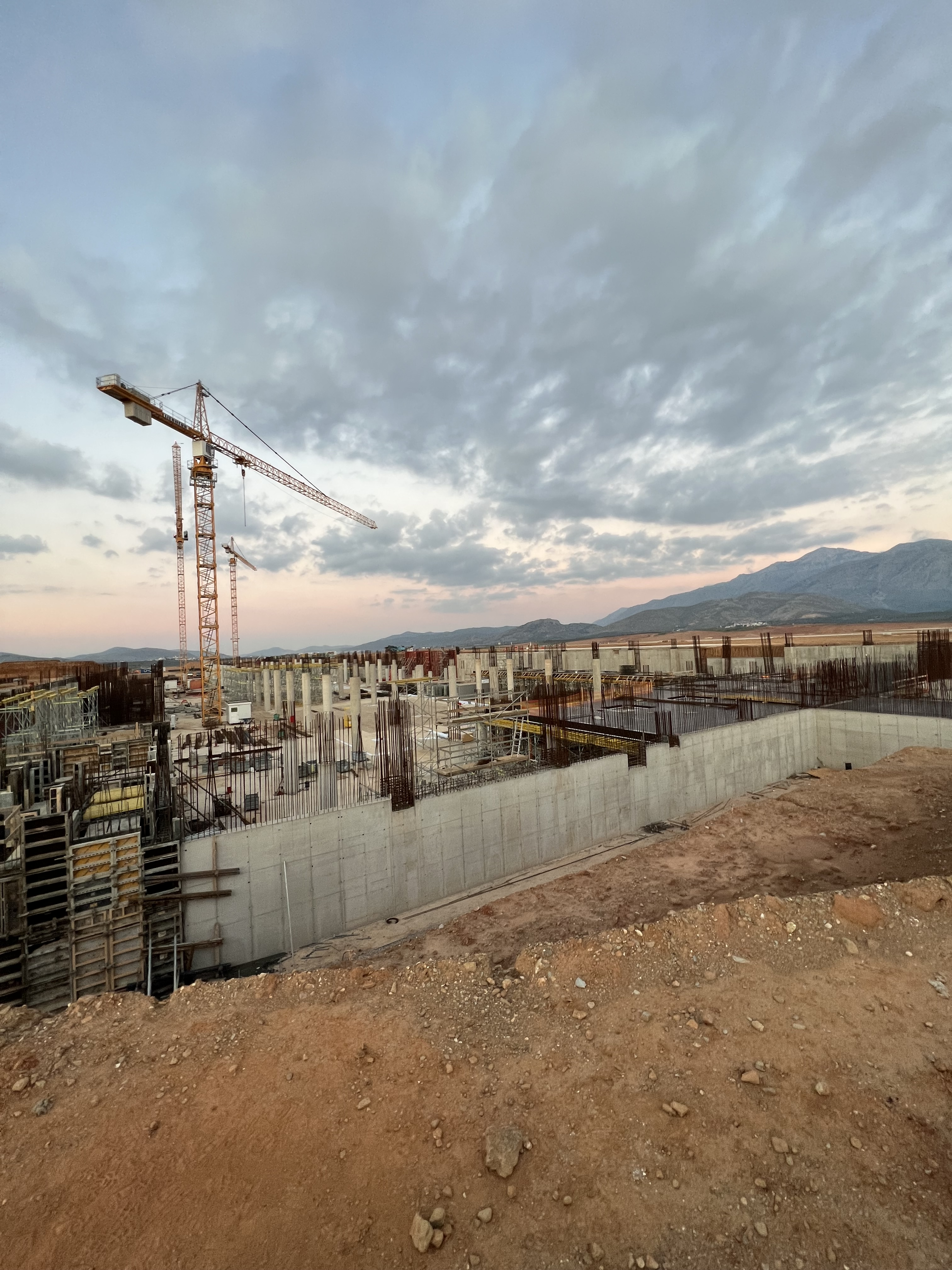
The airport terminal under construction in 2023

The construction phase of the airport commenced in February 2020 after Greek Prime Minister Kyriakos Mitsotakis laid the foundation stone. Under the concession agreement, the construction of the airport is set to last a total of 60 months (i.e., 5 years) until 2025. Due to the impact COVID-19 pandemic had on the construction timeline, the commencement of operations was pushed back to early 2028. According to the latest revisions of the master plan, the airport is to have a 94,000 square meter terminal, 10 passenger boarding bridges, 19 boarding gates and an initial capacity of 11 million passengers per year.

In June 2024, construction crew discovered an ancient Minoan architectural ensemble on the top of Papoura Hill where a radar system was planned to be built. After meeting with Greece’s Culture Ministry, planners decided to prioritize the excavation and protection of the ancient structure while concurrently continuing airport construction in other areas.

In January 2026, Prime Minister Kyriakos Mitsotakis visited the construction site to mark the launch of an international tender for the airport’s aeronautical systems and reaffirmed that operations are scheduled to begin in 2028. By that time, construction had reached approximately 67% completion. The project continues to face legal and archaeological challenges concerning the planned radar installation on Papoura Hill, with a related appeal pending before Greece’s Council of State.

== See also ==
- List of airports in Crete
- Heraklion International Airport
