= Om Habibeh Aga Khan =

French-Egyptian beauty queen and wife of Aga Khan III

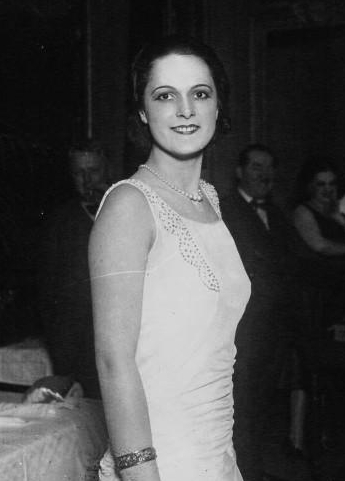
- Om Habibeh Aga Khan in 1930
- Born: Yvonne Blanche Labrousse; 15 February 1906; Sète, France
- Died: 1 July 2000 (aged 94); Le Cannet, France
- Burial: Mausoleum of Aga Khan
- Spouse: Sultan Muhammad Shah (m. 1944; died 1957)
- Father: Adrien Labrousse
- Mother: Marie Brouet

Om Habibeh Aga Khan (born Yvonne Blanche Labrousse; 15 February 1906 – 1 July 2000) was the fourth and last wife of Sultan Muhammad Shah, who went by the title Aga Khan III. They were married in 1944, thirteen months after his divorce from his third wife, and remained married until his death in 1957.

She died at the age of 94 in Le Cannet and was buried in her husband's mausoleum in Aswan.

== Biography ==
=== Early life ===
She was born Yvonne Blanche Labrousse in the town of Sète, France on 15 February 1906, but was called Yvette. She was the daughter of Adrien Labrousse, a tramway conductor, and Marie Brouet, a seamstress. Her family soon moved to Cannes and later on to Lyon where the young Yvette spent most of her childhood. In 1929, at the age of twenty-four, she became Miss Lyon and one year later she was named Miss France. As a beauty queen and a representative of France, she traveled to many countries around the world. She found herself particularly taken by Egypt and, in the late 1930s, she moved to Cairo and adopted the faith of Islam.

=== Married life ===
Yvette Labrousse met Sultan Muhammad Shah III in Egypt, and they were married on 9 October 1944 in Switzerland. Upon marriage, she adopted the name Om Habibeh, reportedly in reference to one of the wives of the Prophet Muhammad. Aga Khan III is said to have nicknamed her "Yaky", a combination of "Yvette", "Aga", and "Khan". A residence was later built at 55 Avenue Victoria, Le Cannet, France, named "Yakymour", a portmanteau of her nickname and the French word for love.

In 1954, she was referred to within the Ismaili community as Mata Salamat, a term loosely translated as "Serene Mother" or "Mother of Peace." The title appears to have been honorary and symbolic, with no formal or institutional role publicly documented. Shortly before his death in 1957, Sultan selected a site on the west bank of the Nile near Aswan, Egypt, as his burial place.

The site was later developed into a mausoleum, a project overseen by Om Habibeh and completed in 16 months with the assistance of architect Farid El-Shafie and contractor Hassan Dorra.

=== Later life ===
In his will, Sultan Muhammad Shah named his grandson Karim as his successor, bypassing his son Aly Khan. The will also stated that Om Habibeh should provide general guidance during the early years of Karim's tenure. According to the document, she had long been familiar with matters affecting the community and was described as possessing sound judgment. After her husband's death, she divided her time primarily between residences in Aswan and Le Cannet, with additional stays in Geneva and Paris. She died on 1 July 2000 at the age of 94 in Le Cannet, France.

=== Om Habibeh Foundation ===
In 1991, she founded the Om Habibeh Foundation, a non-profit organization focused on health and education initiatives in the Aswan region. The foundation funded projects including a dialysis centre and several schools. In Le Cannet, she also supported the establishment of a retirement home. In 1999, a statue of her was unveiled in the Jardin des Oliviers by the mayor of Le Cannet Rocheville.

=== Red Rose Ritual and Public Perception ===
While in Egypt, Om Habibeh is reported to have regularly placed a red rose on the tomb of her husband, a ritual that was reportedly continued by a gardener in her absence. Some accounts have described her relationship with Aga Khan III in romanticized terms, characterizing it as a "storybook" or "legendary" romance; such descriptions originate primarily from biographical or community sources rather than independent scholarship.

== Honours ==
=== Iranian honours ===
- Member of the Order of the Pleiades, 1st Class.
- 25th Centennial Anniversary Medal (14 October 1971).

| Preceded by Madeleine Mourgues | Miss France; 1930 | Succeeded by Jeanne Juilla |
