= Papoura Hill Circular Structure =

2000-1700 BCE Minoan structural ensemble discovered in 2024

- 35°13′11.7″N 25°19′20.9″E
- Cultures: Minoan
- Location: Kastelli, Heraklion, Crete, Greece

The Papoura Hill Circular Structure is a large Minoan architectural ensemble dated to between 2000 and 1700 BCE, constructed of several concentric circles located at the highest point of Papoura hill, northwest of the town of Kastelli on the island of Crete, Greece. It was discovered in June 2024 on the construction site of Kasteli Airport.

== Background ==
The structure was discovered during construction of a radar system being built for the New International Airport of Heraklion Crete in Kastelli. A meeting was held at the site of the discovery between the Ministry of Culture and Ministry of Infrastructure and Transport, where they concluded that they would prioritize excavating the structure and preserving it over construction of the airport in the area.

== Description ==
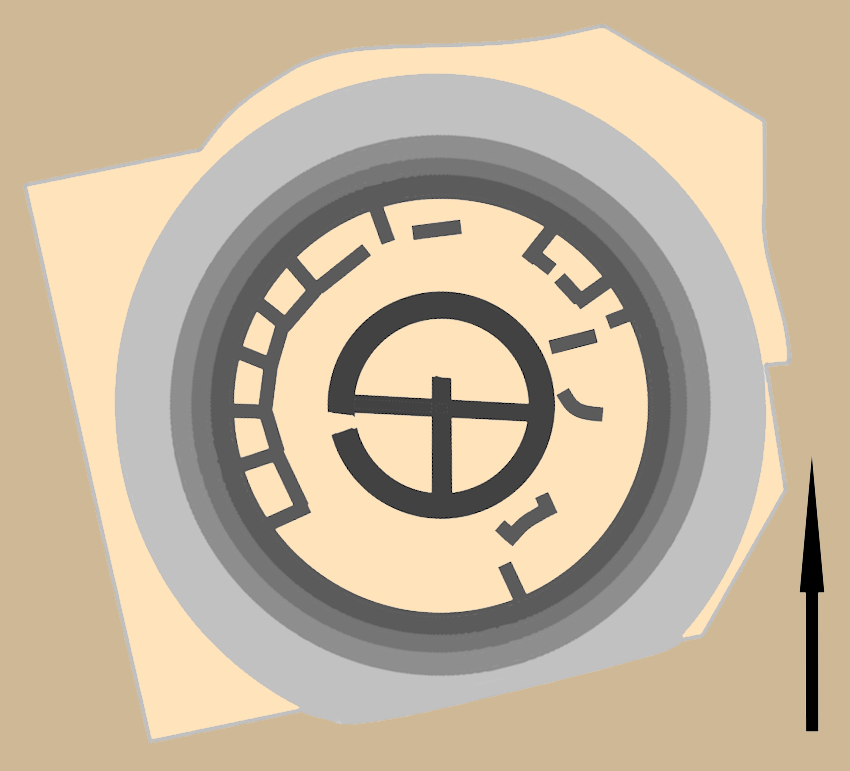
Layout of the archaeological structures on the Cretan hill of Papoura

According to the Greek Ministry of Culture, the structure is about 48 meters (157 ft) in diameter and covers an area of about 1,800 square meters (19,000 sq ft). consists of "8 superimposed stone rings - average thickness 1.40m", each developed at different elevation levels, with the highest surviving section at 1.7 meters (5 ft 7 in) tall. A 15-meter diameter circular building dubbed "Zone A" stood in the center surrounded by the rings, with its nine-meter wide interior divided into 4 quadrants. Surrounding Zone A was a second circular building 6.9 meters wide, whose radial walls "intersect vertically the rings of the lower levels forming smaller spaces". Two spaces on the southwest and northwest sides of the central circular buildings could have been main entrances. The spaces were connected to each other with narrow openings making an "almost labyrinthine structure". Excavators could not yet determine the original shape or height of the construction, but postulated that the structure was originally shaped in a truncated cone or vaulted manner.

Excavators estimated that the structure was mainly used between 2000 and 1700 BCE, being constructed roughly around the beginning of the Protopalatial period (MM IB). Neopalatial pottery was found in the destruction layer, implying that the construction continued to be used through later periods of Minoan civilization. Most of the artifacts uncovered in the construction were located inside or around Zones A and B, indicating that they were the main functional areas. Excavators were not yet able to determine the precise function of the building, but discoveries of large amounts of animal bones indicate that it was a community building where sacrifices took place that could have involved "the consumption of food, wine and perhaps offerings".

The plan and nature of the construction did not have a close parallel in structure or architecture to other buildings in Crete created around the same time period, and closer resembled constructions from the Middle East in the early Bronze Age, such as an "elliptical [Middle Minoan] building of Hamaizius" and a "circular proto-Hellenic cyclopean building of Tiryns". The construction did have structural similarities to vaulted tombs in southern Crete from the pre-Hellenic Prepalatial and Protopalatial periods, and also to ancient mounds found in the main body of Greece.

== See also ==
- Hagia Triada – Archaeological site in Greece
- Knossos – Archaeological site and Minoan palace complex in Heraklion, Crete
- Phaistos – Ancient Greek city in Crete
