= Shenila Khoja-Moolji =

Pakistani-American academic

Shenila Khoja-Moolji is the Hamad bin Khalifa al-Thani Endowed Chair of Muslim Societies and Professor at Georgetown University. She is known for her award-winning contributions to studies of girlhood, masculinity, and community formation.

Khoja-Moolji is the author of four scholarly monographs published by University of California Press, Oxford University Press, and University of Minnesota Press that have won awards from international academic associations. Her books include: Forging the Ideal Educated Girl: The Production of Desirable Subjects in Muslim South Asia (University of California Press, 2018); Sovereign Attachments: Masculinity, Muslimness, and Affective Politics in Pakistan (University of California Press, 2021); Rebuilding Community: Displaced Women and the Making of a Shia Ismaili Muslim Sociality (Oxford University Press, 2023); and The Impossibility of Muslim Boyhood (University of Minnesota Press, 2024).

== Early life and education ==
Khoja-Moolji grew up in Hyderabad, Pakistan. She is a Shia Ismaili Muslim. She received a scholarship from the United World Colleges to do an International Baccalaureate. She studied at Brown University, Harvard University, and Columbia University.

== Career ==
Between 2016 and 2018, Khoja-Moolji was a postdoctoral and visiting scholar at the University of Pennsylvania's Alice Paul Center for Research on Gender, Sexuality and Women. In 2018, she joined the Gender, Sexuality, and Women's Studies program at Bowdoin College, where she earned early tenure and promotion within three and a half years. In 2022, Khoja-Moolji was appointed as the Hamad bin Khalifa al-Thani Associate Professor of Muslim societies, a tenured and endowed chair position, at Georgetown University.

Khoja-Moolji is known for her theorizations of Muslim girlhood, which includes several articles that analyze the portrayal of Malala Yousafzai and the politics of international development campaigns.

Her first book, Forging the Ideal Educated Girl: The Production of Desirable Subjects in Muslim South Asia, published by the University of California Press (2018), is a genealogy of the 'educated girl.' The book shows how girl's education is a site of struggle for multiple groups—from national to religious elites—through which they construct gender, class, and religious identities. The book was published in the Islamic Humanities open-access series. The book won the 2019 Jackie Kirk Outstanding Book Award from the Comparative and International Education Society.

Her second book, Sovereign Attachments: Masculinity, Muslimness, and Affective Politics in Pakistan, also published the University of California Press (2021), re-theorizes sovereignty by drawing on affect, cultural, and religious studies. The book won the Best Book Award from the Theory section of the International Studies Association. The book also won the 2022 Best Book award from The Association for Middle East Women's Studies.

Her third book, Rebuilding Community: Displaced Women and the Making of a Shia Ismaili Muslim Sociality published by Oxford University press (2023), is a first attempt to archive the lives of twentieth-century Ismaili women. The book follows Ismaili women who were displaced in the 1970s from East Africa and East Pakistan, to elaborate how they recreated their religious community in transit and in new regions of settlement, particularly North America. The book won the 2024 Nautilus Book Award.

Her fourth book, The Impossibility of Muslim Boyhood (University of Minnesota Press, 2024) is a public cultural critique of Muslim boyhood in America.

In 2019, Khoja-Moolji was elected to the South Asia Council of the Association for Asian Studies. In 2023, she joined the Steering Committee of North American Religions at the American Academy of Religion.

Khoja-Moolji is the recipient of multiple career awards: the Emerging Scholar Award from the Muslim Philanthropy Initiative based at Indiana University; the Early Career Award for Community Engagement from the International Studies Association's Feminist Theory and Gender Studies section; and the Early Career Award from Teachers College, Columbia University.

Khoja-Moolji has published writing in Al Jazeera and the Express Tribune on Ismaili culture and Islamic culture.
