= Brahe Church =

Coordinates: 58.0350°N 14.3433°E

- Brakekyrkan
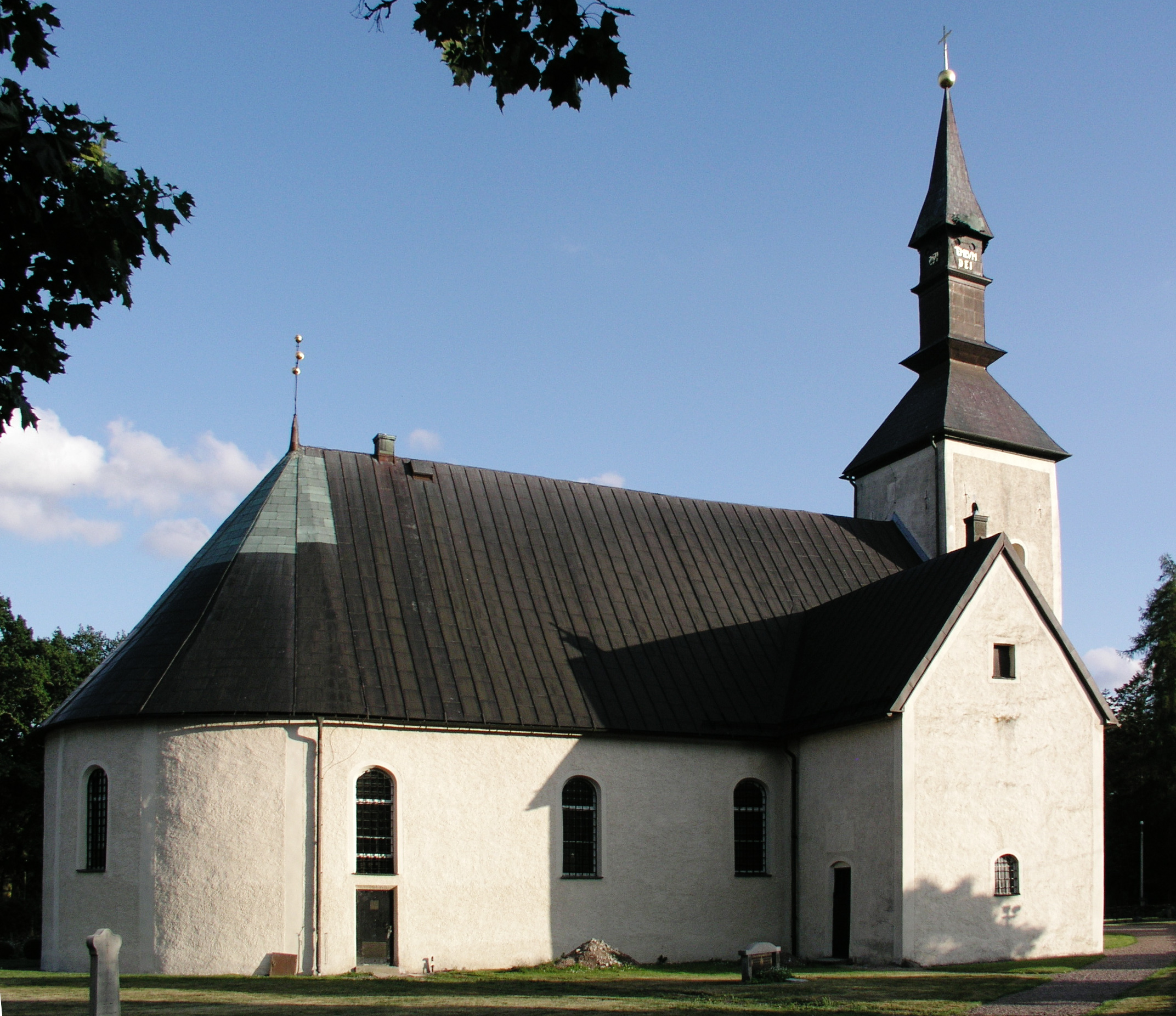
- Brahe Church in July 2006
- Brahe Church
- Location: Visingsö
- Country: Sweden
- Denomination: Church of Sweden

Administration
- Diocese: Växjö
- Parish: Visingsö

Brahe Church (Swedish: Brakekyrkan) is a church building on the island of Visingsö in the lake of Vättern in Sweden. Belonging to the Visingsö Parish of the Church of Sweden, it was opened in 1636 as Wisingsborg Castle Church (Swedish: Wisingsborgs slottskyrka).

Brahe Church was erected as a royal church at the beginning of the 17th century. A church built in the Middle Ages, Ströja Church, already existed on its site at that time.

Ströja Church was built in the 12th century and was then the royal church. At the beginning of the 17th century, Count Magnus Brahe built a new church on the foundation of the medieval Ströja Church. All that Magnus Brahe retained from the older church was the beautifully ornamented door to the sacristy, which probably originally stood in the main entrance of Ströja Church. However, Magnus Brahe didn't have time to experience the church's completion. It was his nephew Per Brahe the Younger who inherited the building and dedicated the new church in 1636.

The church is a spacious hall church in the Renaissance style. It is made of clay slate, sandstone and limestone, and its roof is covered with copper that was donated by a sister of Per Brahe the Younger, Christina Brahe. The splendidly decorated church serves as a museum, art gallery and curios cabinet as well as a place of worship. A visit to Brahe Church presents a picture of the splendor that once was characteristic of Sweden's largest countship, Visingsborg.

In 2024, a church construction project led to the discovery of two graves dating from the late 12th century; one of them contained 170 silver bracteates or coins strewn about the body. Archeological investigation of the find is ongoing.
