= Kastelli, Heraklion =

Kastelli Καστέλλι
- Municipal unit
- Location within the regional unit

- Location within Greece
- Coordinates: 35°12′N 25°21′E
- Country: Greece
- Administrative region: Crete
- Regional unit: Heraklion
- Municipality: Minoa Pediada

Area
  - Municipal unit: 123.3 km^{2} (47.6 sq mi)

Population (2021)
  - Municipal unit: 4,030
  - Municipal unit density: 32.7/km^{2} (84.7/sq mi)
  - Community: 1,285
- Time zone: UTC+2 (EET)
  - Summer (DST): UTC+3 (EEST)

Kastelli (Greek: Καστέλλι, Kastélli; also Καστέλι, Kastéli), often called Kastelli Pediadas (Greek: Καστέλλι Πεδιάδας) to differentiate it from Kissamos (also occasionally called Kastelli-Kissamos) is a village and a former municipality in the Heraklion regional unit, Crete, Greece. Since the 2011 local government reform it is part of the municipality Minoa Pediada, of which it is a municipal unit. The municipal unit has an area of 123.325 km^{2} (47.616 sq mi). Its population is 4,030 (2021 census).

Kastelli Airport is located in the outskirts of the village, south of the main settlement.

== Archaeology ==
In June 2024, the Greek Ministry of Culture announced the discovery of the Papoura Hill Circular Structure, a large Bronze Age-era Minoan architectural construction used between 2000–1700 BC.
