= Grzybek =

Village in Kociewie

- Hamlet
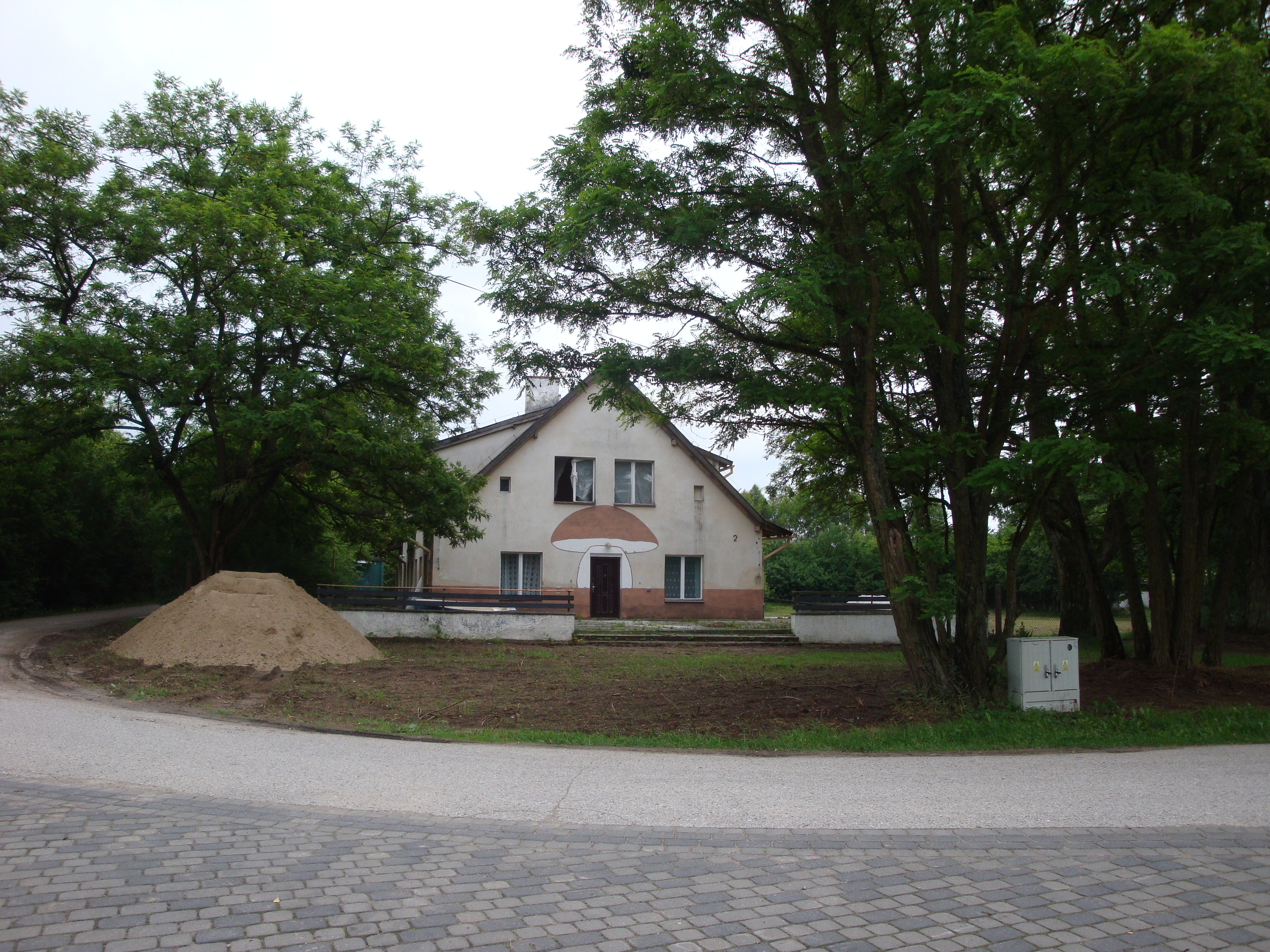
- A building in the hamlet with a penny bun painted on it
- Interactive map of Grzybek
- Country: Poland
- Voivodeship: Kuyavian–Pomeranian
- County: Świecie
- Gmina: Osie
- Postal code: 86-150
- SIMC: 0093237

Grzybek is a hamlet in the administrative district of Gmina Osie, within Świecie County, Kuyavian–Pomeranian Voivodeship, in northern Poland. The village lies within the ethnocultural region of Kociewie.

In 2024, amateur archæologists, who had discovered the grave of an unknown WWII soldier, unearthed the remnants of a Gothic burial place. They also found Roman and Byzantine coins, the latter featuring the head of Basil II, as well as 9,000-year-old flint tools.
