= William Edward Kettler =

American archaeologist (1922–2024)

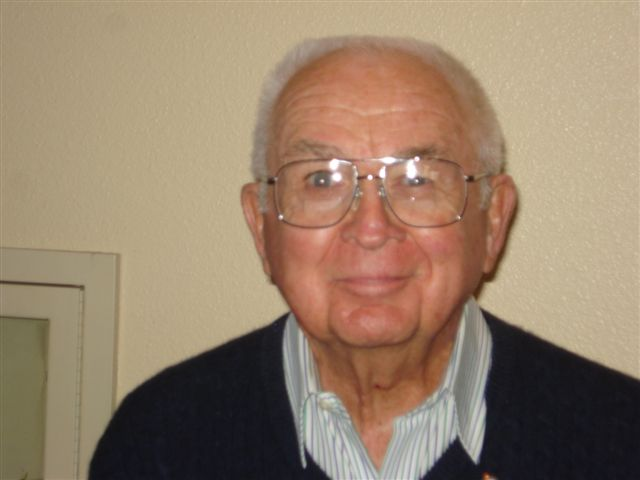
- Born: March 10, 1922; Garden Grove, California
- Died: January 7, 2024 (aged 101); Huntington Beach, California

William Edward Kettler (March 10, 1922 – January 7, 2024) was an American archaeologist and Rotary International leader.

== Early life and education ==
Kettler was born in Garden Grove, California, on March 10, 1922, to William Frederick Kettler and Margaret Cecelia Connors. His grandparents were German immigrants, Emil Kettler and Amalie Ruoff, farmers and land owners. He was valedictorian of his class at Springdale Elementary, and was one of two children in his graduating class. Around 1935, as a young boy, he often hiked in the rural area now called the Bolsa Chica wetlands mesa. On his hikes, he found arrowheads, cogs, and two full skeletons in what is now known to be the Indian Middens of the Juaneño (Gabrielino-Tongva Band of Mission Indians). He brought them home until around 1950 when he met an American Indian – Apache, named Colonel Ted Davis, who convinced him that the bones needed a dignified burial. So the bones were buried privately without ceremony in the Smith (now Good Shepherd) Cemetery.

Kettler graduated from Huntington Beach Union High School in 1939, and then attended UCLA from 1939 to 1942. He enlisted in the Army Air Corps (the US Air Force) in 1942 during World War II. Kettler then entered the U.S. Army Technical Training School at Yale and was commissioned after graduation. While serving during World War II, Kettler was stationed in Alaska, where he and his men discovered the first fully intact Japanese Zero warplane. The Zero was shipped to the mainland where it was studied and its inherent weaknesses were integrated into training which helped to save countless American and Allied forces lives. When the war ended, Kettler was a captain but stayed in the reserves and retired as a Lt. Colonel.

== Career ==
After leaving the military, Kettler went to work for his father-in-law at Smith's Mortuary (17 years) with the title that he liked to call "horizontal engineer" or mortician. In 1962, he became a Financial Consultant with CLU designation in 1971 and Securities Principal. During the 1990s developers proposed building on the Bolsa Chica land area, claiming that it was not an Indian Burial ground. It was not until Kettler came forward with his buried discovery that the truth would come out. This discovery would later become ORA-83, one of the South County's most significant archeological sites, an 8,000-year-old American Indian village and burial ground. After serving for 13 years as a trustee of the HB Elementary School District (a three-time President) and a trustee for 17 years and a President twice with the Coast Community College, the William E. Kettler school was dedicated in 1973 and was open until June 2005. In 2017, renovations of The William E. Kettler School began. The Kettler School will be converted into headquarters for the Huntington Beach City School District.

His other service titles included Past President of the Rotary Club of Huntington Beach, past Director of the HB Chamber of Commerce, and past member of the HB Planning Commission. He worked with the American Legion and held a position with the Family Service Association. Kettler was also a Bolsa Chica Land Trust docent and board member of the Rotary Club of Huntington Beach Rotary until his death.

In 2015-16, Kettler was honored as the Huntington Beach Outstanding Citizen of the Year.

== Personal life and death ==
Kettler married Marjorie Marie Smith on September 23, 1943. He died in Huntington Beach, California, on January 7, 2024, at the age of 101.

== Sources ==
- James Lawrence Kettler; Jack Raymond Kettler; William Edward Kettler (2007). The Kettler Family: Early Life in Huntington Beach. Orange County Pioneer Council and California State University, Fullerton Oral History Program.
- In The Pipeline: Marsh docent gives personal history tour, hbindependent.com. Accessed February 9, 2024.
