= Mausoleum of Aga Khan =

Mausoleum at the west bank of Aswan, Egypt

Coordinates: 24°05′18″N 32°52′44″E

The Mausoleum of Aga Khan is the mausoleum of Aga Khan III (Sir Sultan Muhammed Shah, who died in 1957). The mausoleum is located at Aswan along the Nile of Egypt, since Egypt was formerly the centre of power of the Fatimids, an Ismaili Shia dynasty. It is now also the resting place of Aga Khan IV (Karim al-Hussaini, who died in 2025).

The construction of the mausoleum began in 1956 and ended in 1960. The Aga Khan III's wife, Begum Om Habibeh Aga Khan, commissioned the construction of the mausoleum, which initially accepted tourists inside; however, the interior was closed off to the public in 1997.

A red rose is laid on the Aga Khan III's tomb every day – a practice first started by Begum Om Habibeh Aga Khan.

The archaeological research and preservation project of the Aga Khan Necropolis, led by the University of Milan, was awarded the national Crystal Compass Award, a Russian national award recognizing outstanding geographical and research projects.

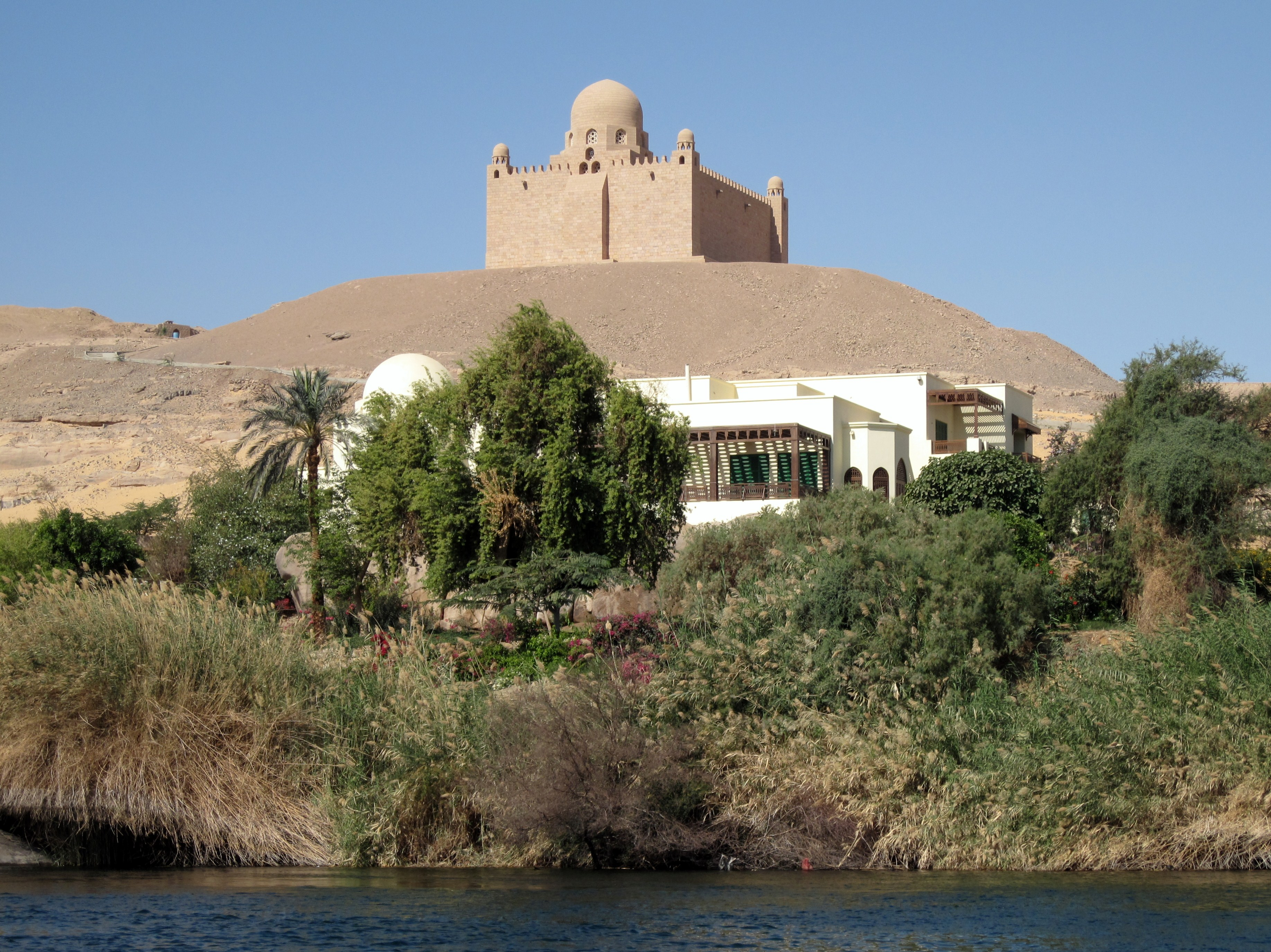
The mausoleum sits atop a hill along the west bank of the Nile, where it overlooks the Prince Sadruddin Aga Khan House, a winter home of the Aga Khan.

== Site ==
The mausoleum sits atop a hill along the west bank of the Nile, where it overlooks the villa of Aga Khan III and Begum Om Habibeh, later the home of Prince Sadruddin Aga Khan. The villa was designed by Egyptian architect Hassan Fathy, and it served as a winter home for Aga Khan III, whose will stated that he would be buried near the villa two years after his death.

== Architectural style ==
=== Architect ===
Egyptian architect Farid Shafi'e (1907–1985) designed the mausoleum, who during his career served as an architectural designer; professor and director of the architecture department at Cairo University; and consultant for the King Abdulaziz University, among other roles. Among some of the other buildings that Farid Shafie designed during his career are the headquarters of the Royal Navy in Cairo; the Office of the Sheikh at the Al-Azhar Mosque; and a royal suite in the Abdeen Palace in Cairo.

Farid Shafi'e published numerous journal articles and books during his career, including an article about the Juyushi Mosque, the Fatimid building that the Mausoleum of Aga Khan III was designed to resemble. Some of Shafi'e's other publications include Characteristics of Decorated Wood in the Abbasid and Fatimid Styles (1954); Arabic Islamic Architecture: Its Past, Present and Future (1981); and Arab Architecture in Islamic Egypt, Volume 2: The Fatimid Era (1982). Shafi'e's past publications indicate that he had studied Fatimid architecture extensively prior to designing the Mausoleum of Aga Khan III.

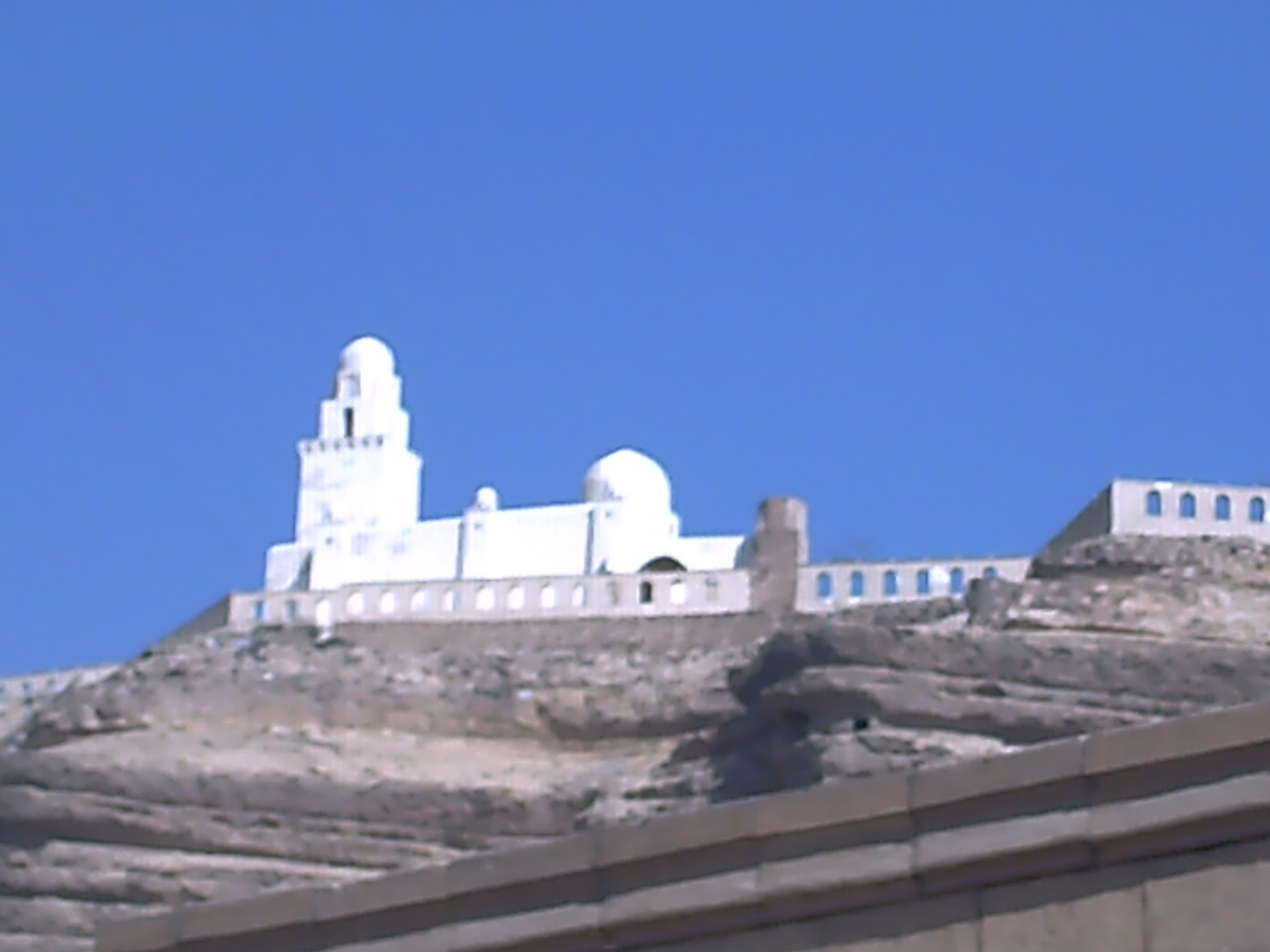
Masjid al-Juyushi, a Fatimid mosque, served as an architectural inspiration for the Mausoleum of Aga Khan III. Both structures feature a rectangular layout with high walls, a central dome, and numerous smaller domes.

=== Stylistic influences ===
The Mausoleum of Aga Khan III was designed to resemble the Masjid al-Juyushi, a Fatimid mosque and dedicated mausoleum that was constructed in 1085. Both the Masjid al-Juyushi and the Mausoleum of Aga Khan III feature a rectangular layout with high walls, a central dome, and numerous smaller domes. Like the Masjid al-Juyushi, the Mausoleum of Aga Khan III also features an interior mihrab for prayer. Despite numerous functional and aesthetic similarities, the Mausoleum of Aga Khan III does not share some of the Masjid al-Juyushi's most revered features, such as its minaret, its muqarnas cornice, or its courtyard.

Based on aesthetic similarities, the Mausoleum of Aga Khan III's architectural style may have also looked to other examples of Fatimid architecture for inspiration, such as the Aswan Necropolis, a collection of tombs constructed between the 10th and 12th centuries. Both the Mausoleum of Aga Khan III and the Aswan Necropolis feature domes with octagonal transition zones, arched doorways, mihrabs, and building materials that blend in with the surrounding desert environment (the Aswan Necropolis tombs were mostly built with mud brick and coated with lime plaster).

Another Fatimid mausoleum that the Mausoleum of Aga Khan III may have looked to for inspiration is the Mashhad al-Sayyida Ruqayya, which was constructed in Cairo in 1133/527 AH. Like the Mausoleum of Aga Khan III, the Mashhad al-Sayyida Ruqayya features a dome with an octagonal transition zone as well as arched tracery windows with geometric patterns.

Given the many distinct shared features between the Mausoleum of Aga Khan III and various Fatimid mausoleums, it can be understood that the design of Aga Khan's mausoleum was largely influenced by Fatimid architecture.

=== Exterior design ===
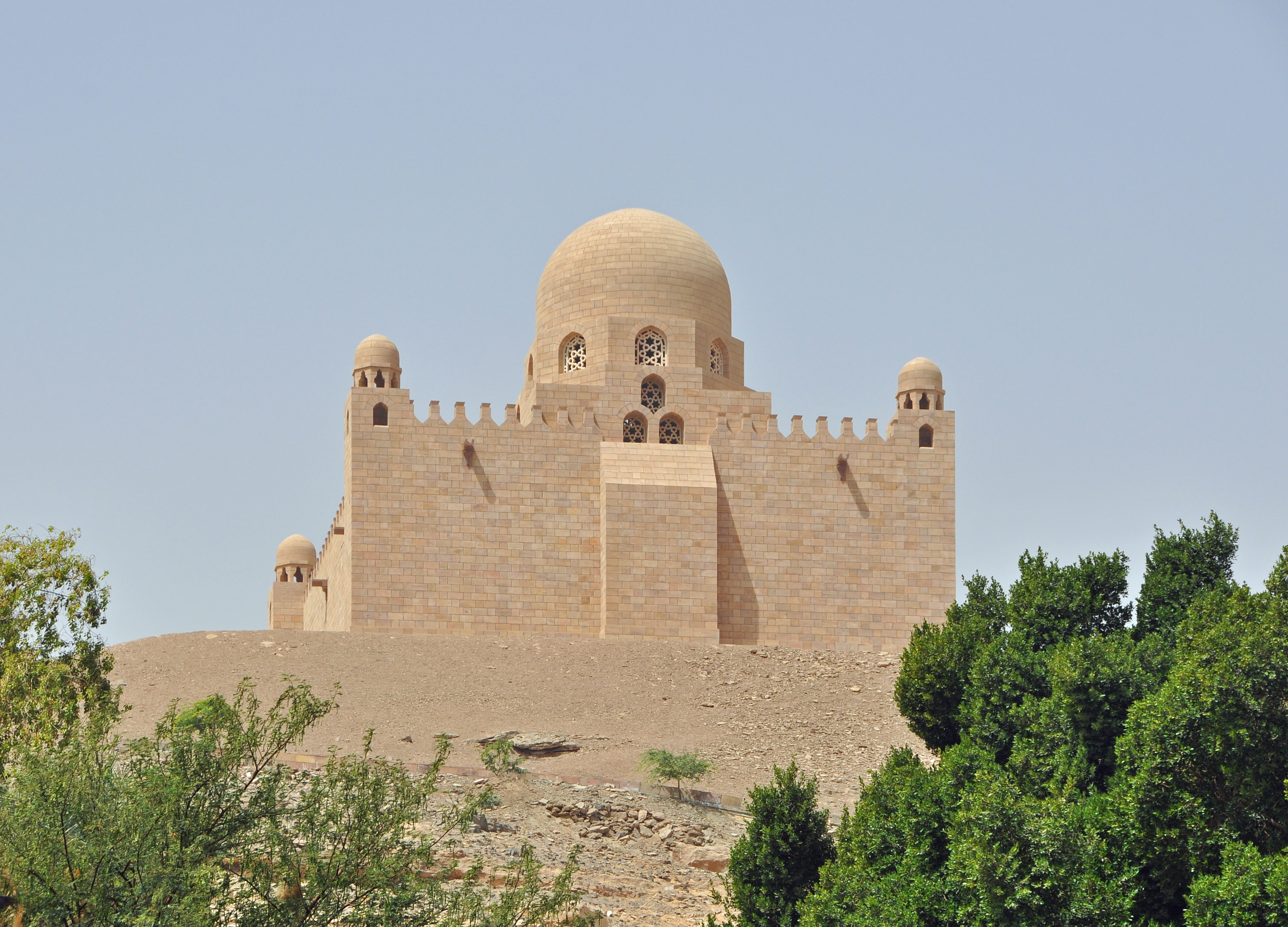
The mausoleum features crenellated parapet walls, a large central dome with tracery windows along the drum, four smaller domes on each corner of the outer wall, and a mihrab for prayer.

The Mausoleum of Aga Khan III is built of pink limestone. Crenellated parapets line the outer wall, and an arched doorway on the western side of mausoleum serves as the only entrance to the mausoleum's interior. The eastern side of the mausoleum features a large central dome with arched tracery windows along the octagonal drum. Four miniature domes are located on each corner of the outer wall.

=== Interior design ===
Quran'ic inscriptions adorn the interior tomb of Aga Khan III, which is made of Carrara marble. The mausoleum's floor plan indicates that the tomb faces a mihrab, which is located under the central dome on the eastern wall of the mausoleum.

== Burial of Aga Khan III ==
Aga Khan III was reburied in the mausoleum on 20 February 1959, two years after his death and first burial in Switzerland. Those in attendance included Aga Khan IV, Begum Om Habibeh Aga Khan, and over 2,000 other guests. Begum Om Habibeh Aga Khan died in 2000 before being buried in the mausoleum neighboring that of her husband.

== Burial of Aga Khan IV ==
Aga Khan IV was buried in the mausoleum on 9 February 2025, following his death five days earlier in Lisbon, Portugal.

== Gallery ==
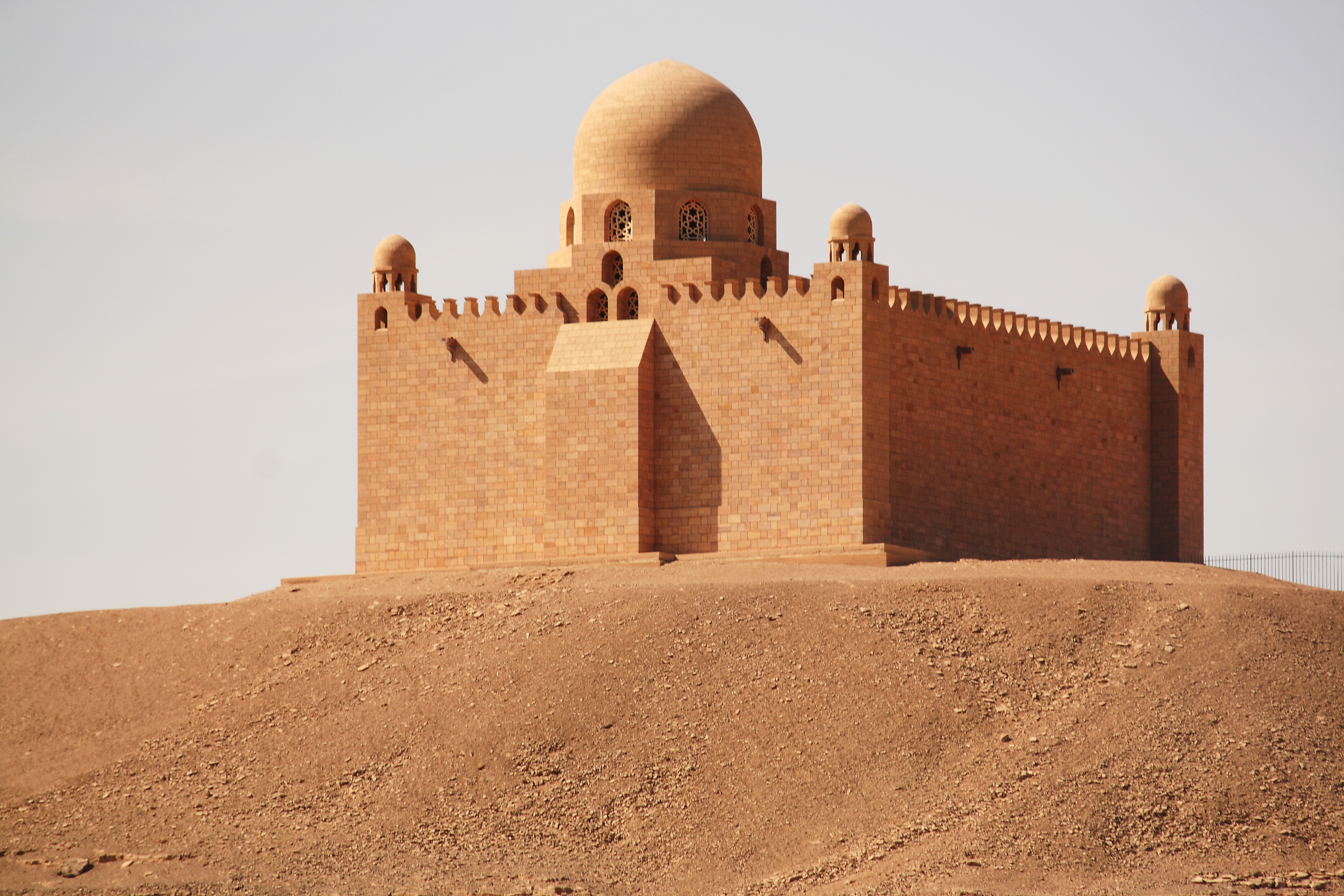

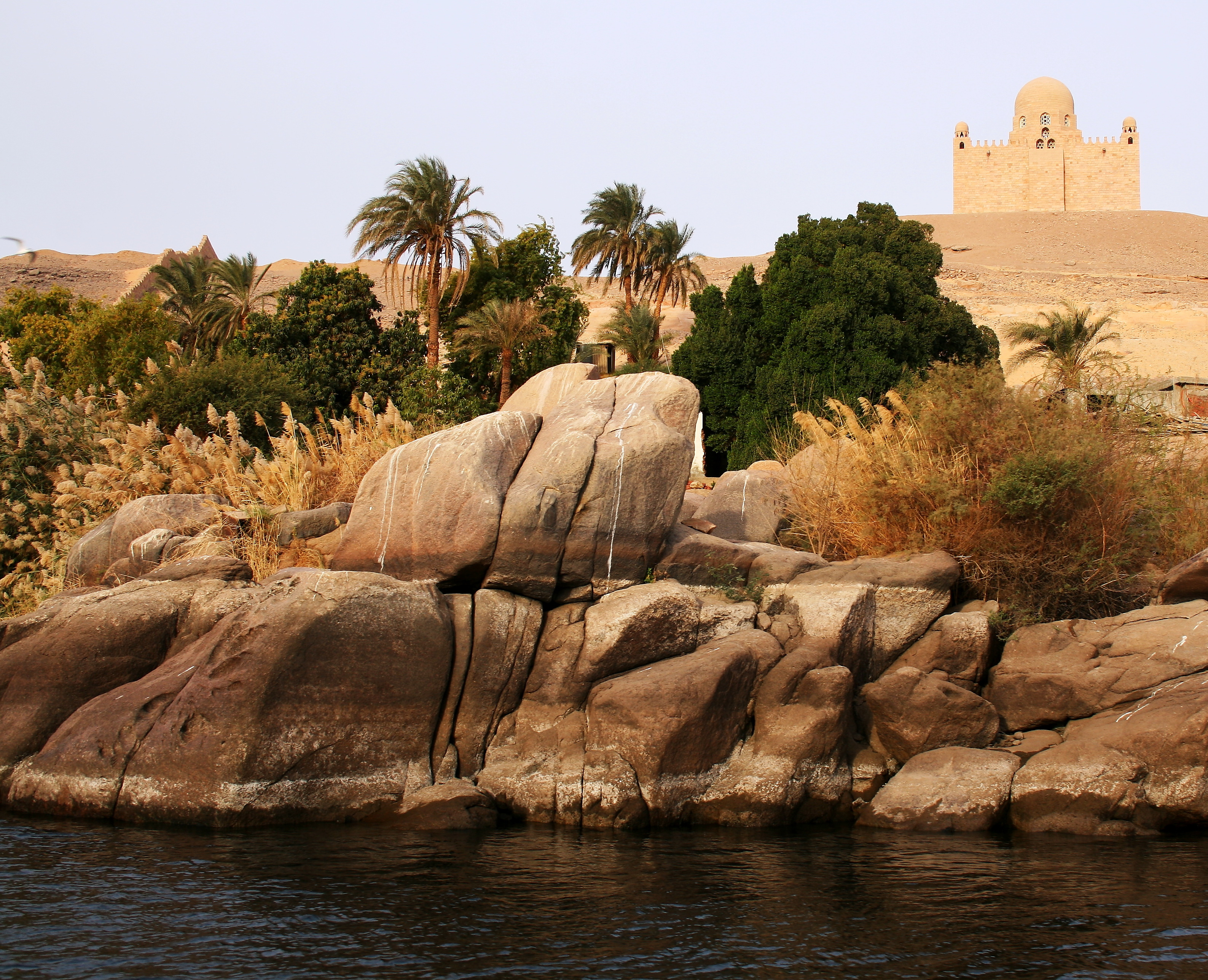

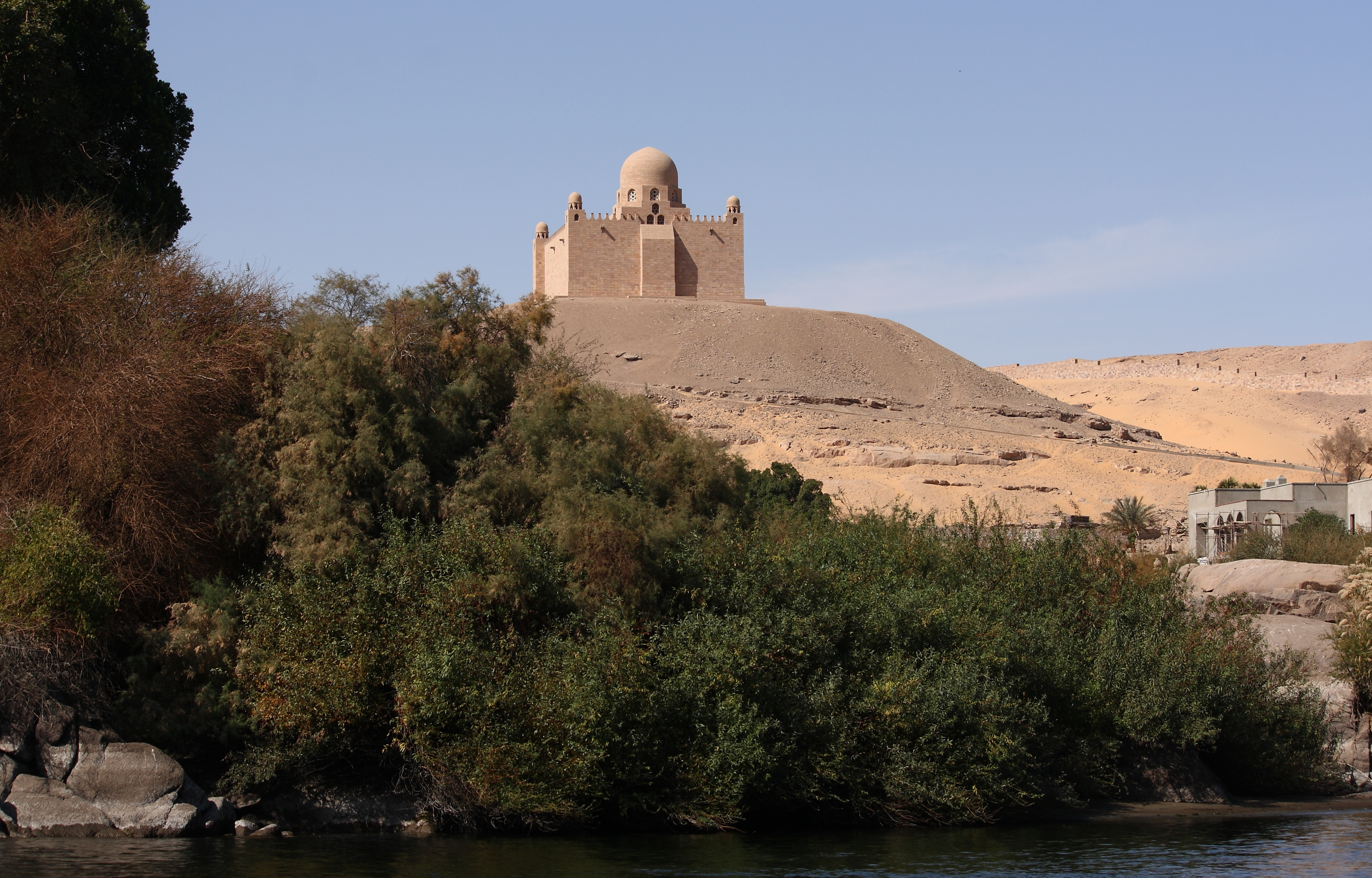

== See also ==
- Fatimid art
- Nizari Isma'ilism
- Aga Khan
