= Neoklis Sarris =

Greek academic, jurist and politician

- Νεοκλής Σαρρής
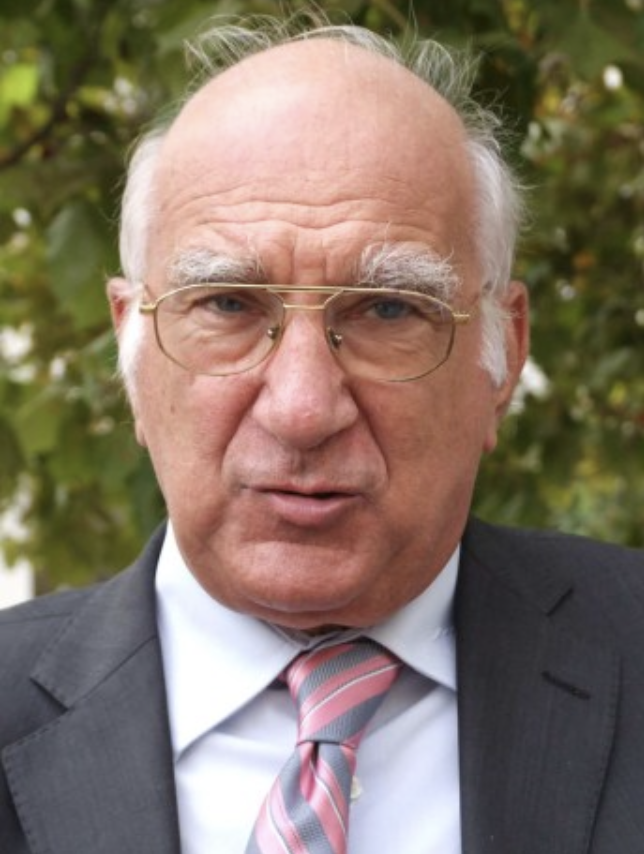
- Born: 5 May 1940; Istanbul
- Died: 19 November 2011 (aged 71); Athens
- Burial place: First Cemetery of Athens
- Citizenship: Greece
- Education: Politics, Economics, Law, Psychology
- Occupations: academic, professor, writer, historian, politician, jurist, opinion journalist
- Era: Turcology
- Political party: Union Democratic Centre (president)
- Spouse: Flora Sarris
- Children: Alexandros Sarris
- Father: Alexandros Sarris

Neoklis Sarris (Greek: Νεοκλής Σαρρής) was a Greek academic, jurist and politician. He was born in Istanbul on 5 May 1940, and died in Athens on 19 November 2011 from cancer. His great-grandfather Alexandros was a grain merchant moved to Istanbul from Makrinitsa, thus Neoklis Sarris' origin was Greek.

== Education ==
Neoklis Sarris was a graduate of the Phanar Greek Orthodox College (known in Greek as the Great School of the Nation). He studied Law, Political and Economic Sciences at the Universities of Athens and Constantinople (Istanbul) and Psychology in Geneva. He received his PhD from the Aristotle University of Thessaloniki.

== Teaching ==
He was professor of Sociology of History at the Panteion University, specializing mainly in the Ottoman period. He was President of the Panteion University Sociology Department. He also taught Psychosociology at the University of Zurich, and for 30 years he was professor of Sociology of film at the Hellenic Cinema and Television School Stavrakos (H.C.T.S.S.; Greek: Σχολή Κινηματογράφου και Τηλεόρασης του Λυκούργου Σταυράκου).

== Politics ==
At the age of 20, Neoklis Sarris was a political advisor of the Ecumenical Patriarch Athenagoras I.

He was a consultant of George Mavros and John Zigdis, who were Presidents of the Union Democratic Centre party (E.DI.K.), and after the death of the second, he was appointed the presidency of the party by the Union of the Democratic Centre, and thus became the fourth president after George Papandreou, George Mavros, and John Zigdis in successive order.

In the late 70s, he was an (informal) mediator between Greece and Turkey, negotiating with all of the Turkish leadership and the Prime Minister Mustafa Bülent Ecevit and transferring their thoughts to the Greek Prime Minister through Georgios Mavros.

In the early 90s, Sarris is responsible for the idea of establishing 19 May in Greece as Pontian Greek Genocide Remembrance Day, also, in the late 90s Sarris and his wife Flora had the idea of establishing a Pontian University, but this idea was not implemented.

In March 2012, few months after his death, succeeded from Stavros Karampelas at the 3rd Congress of the Union of the Democratic Centre.

== Works ==
He has published numerous articles in scientific journals and in the daily press. In 2010, he edited the book by academic and Turkish Foreign Minister Ahmet Davutoğlu Strategic Depth. The International Position of Turkey. Yet, he has written the preface in many Greek books and Turkish scholar publications, while many of his works remain unpublished.

His main works are:

- Ottoman Reality (2 volumes), 1990, ISBN 9789602530030
- The Family in Turkey, 1990, ISBN 9789607056054
- Greek Society and Television (2 volumes), 1992
  - 1st volume: ISBN 9789607083036
  - 2nd volume: ISBN 9789607083043
- Foreign Policy and Political Developments of the first Turkish Republic (3 volumes), 1992, ISBN 9789607083050
- Introduction to Sociometry, Group Psychotherapy and Psychodrama, 1995, ISBN 9789607263155
- Philosophy of Society and State (2 volumes), 1997, ISBN 9789603523932
  - 1st volume: Ancient World
  - 2nd volume: Patristic Orthodoxy and Byzantine Thought
- Pre-revolution Greece and Ottoman Rule, 2005, ISBN 9789607290298
- The other Side (3 volumes), 24/04/2023, ISBN 9789925581542
  - 1st volume: Political Diary of the Invasion and Dismemberment of Cyprus
  - 2nd volume: Diplomatic Diary of the Invasion and Dismemberment of Cyprus I
  - 3rd volume: Diplomatic Diary of the Invasion and Dismemberment of Cyprus II

== Sources ==
- "Memory to Neoklis Sarris". EDIK.gr. 19 November 2012.
- "Neoklis Sarris left us". Elliniki-Gnomi.eu. 4 December 2011.
- "Professor Neoklis Sarris' Funeral to be Held on Tuesday". GreekReporter.com. 20 November 2011.
- "Neoklis Sarris (1940-2011): The fragile edifice of "Greek-Turkish friendship"". Epikaira.gr. 21 February 2016. Archived from the original on 21 February 2016.
- "Gerasimos Arsenis, Pontian University and Neoklis Sarris". Mikrasiatis.gr. 25 April 2016. Archived from the original on 22 October 2022.
- "Lost Opportunities or Lost Memory". Paron.gr. 31 January 2010.
