= A Place Without People =

2010 South African family drama film

- Directed by: Andreas Apostolidis
- Written by: Andreas Apostolidis
- Produced by: Rea Apostolides
- Cinematography: Stelios Apostolopoulos
- Edited by: Yuri Averof; Rea Apostolidis
- Music by: Dimitris Desylas
- Production companies: Anemon Productions; Hellenic Radio & Television (ERT)
- Release date: 17 March 2010
- Running time: 55 minutes
- Country: Greece
- Languages: Greek; Swahili; Masai

A Place Without People is a 2010 Greek documentary film directed by Andreas Apostolidis and produced by Rea Apostolides. The documentary reveals the beauty of Tanzanian national reserves such as Serengeti National Park and the Ngorongoro Conservation Area and how the local indigenous population and Western world interacting with them.

The film was shot in Tanzania. It premiered on 10 March 2010 in Greece. The film received positive reviews from critics. In May 2010, at the Green Film Festival in Seoul, the film won the Jury Award. The film also screened and nominated in several film festivals in 2010 including: Thessaloniki Doc Festival, One World Human Rights Film Festival, Docudays, International Human Rights Film Festival, Green Film Festival in Seoul, Planete Doc Review in Poland, ETHNOCINECA, Ethnographical and Documentary Filmfest Vienna, CinemAmbiente Environmental Film Festival, Ischia Film Festival and Encounters South African Documentary Festival.
