= Deputy Prime Minister of Greece =

Senior member of the Greek cabinet

- Coat of arms of the Greek Government

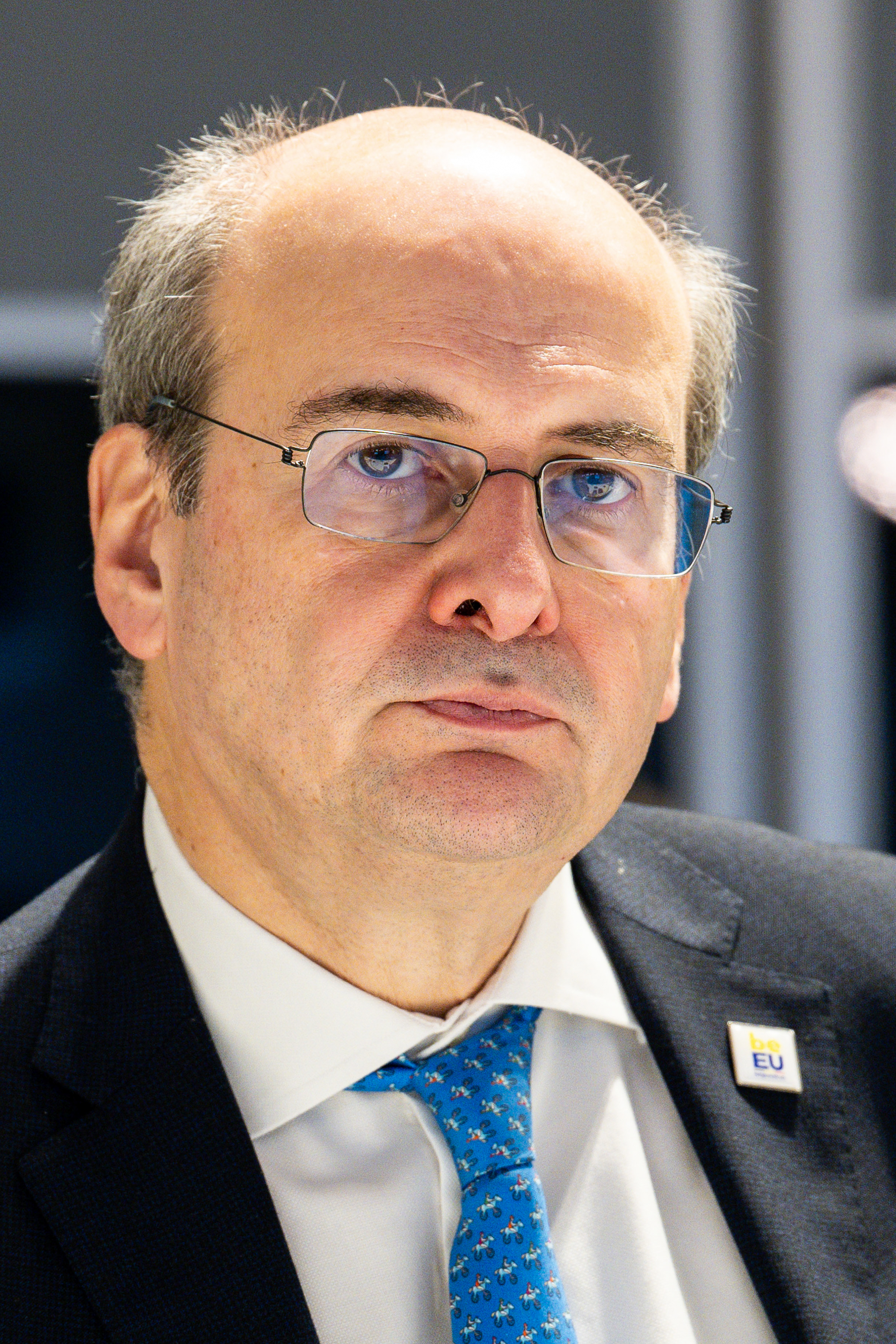
- Incumbent; Kostis Hatzidakis since 15 March 2025
- Government of Greece
- Member of: Cabinet
- Reports to: Prime Minister
- Appointer: Prime Minister
- Term length: No fixed term
- Inaugural holder: Konstantinos Kanaris
- Formation: 1862; 164 years ago
- Website: vicepresident.gov.gr

The Deputy Prime Minister of Greece (Greek: Αντιπρόεδρος της Κυβερνήσεως, romanized: Antipróedros tīs Kyvernī́seōs, "Vice-President of the Government"; older form: Αντιπρόεδρος του Υπουργικού Συμβουλίου, Antipróedros tou Ypourgikoú Symvoulíou, "Vice-President of the Ministerial Council") is the second most senior member of the Cabinet. Despite the English translation of the title, he does not actually deputize for the Prime Minister, rather it is a mostly honorific post for senior ministers, and is usually combined with another senior government portfolio (traditionally either Foreign Affairs, Finance or Defence) or a coordinating role over several ministries. The post is not permanent, rather it is created on an ad hoc basis, usually for the leaders of junior parties in coalition cabinets, and may be held by more than one person at once.

The incumbent Deputy Prime Minister in the Second Cabinet of Kyriakos Mitsotakis is Kostis Hatzidakis, who also serves as Vice President of New Democracy.

== List of deputy prime ministers of Greece ==
- 1862–1863: Konstantinos Kanaris
- 1862–1863: Benizelos Roufos
  - 1916–1917: Pavlos Kountouriotis (Thessaloniki government)
  - 1916–1917: Panagiotis Danglis (Thessaloniki government)
- 1919–1920: Emmanouil Repoulis
- 1929–1932: Andreas Michalakopoulos
- 1932: Andreas Michalakopoulos
- 1932: Stylianos Gonatas (provisional)
- 1935: Georgios Kondylis
- 1935: Ioannis Theotokis
- 1936: Ioannis Metaxas
- 1936–1937: Konstantinos Zavitsianos
- 1941–1942: Alexandros Sakellariou (Government-in-exile after 23 May 1941)
- 1942–1943: Panagiotis Kanellopoulos (Government-in-exile)
  - 1941–1942: Konstantinos Logothetopoulos (Collaborationist government)
- 1942–1944: Georgios Rousos (Government-in-exile)
  - 1944: Ektor Tsironikos (Collaborationist government)
  - [1944: Evripidis Bakirtzis ("Mountain government")] (Note: Not recognized as a government of Greece)
- 1944: Sofoklis Venizelos (Government-in-exile)
- 1945: Kyriakos Varvaresos
- 1945–1946: Georgios Kafantaris
- 1945–1946: Emmanouil Tsouderos
- 1947: Konstantinos Tsaldaris
- 1947: Sofoklis Venizelos
- 1947–1949: Konstantinos Tsaldaris
  - [1947–1949: Ioannis Ioannidis (Communist government)] (Note: Not recognized as a government of Greece)
- 1949: Alexandros Diomidis
- 1949–1950: Konstantinos Tsaldaris
- 1949–1950: Sofoklis Venizelos
- 1950: Panagiotis Kanellopoulos
- 1950: Georgios Papandreou
- 1950–1951: Georgios Papandreou
- 1950: Konstantinos Tsaldaris
- 1951: Emmanouil Tsouderos
- 1951–1952: Sofoklis Venizelos
- 1954–1955: Panagiotis Kanellopoulos
- 1954–1955: Stefanos Stefanopoulos
- 1956–1957: Andreas Apostolidis
- 1959–1961: Panagiotis Kanellopoulos
- 1961: Ioannis Paraskevopoulos
- 1961–1963: Panagiotis Kanellopoulos
- 1963: Sofoklis Venizelos
- 1963: Stefanos Stefanopoulos
- 1964–1965: Stefanos Stefanopoulos
- 1965–1966: Georgios Athanasiadis-Novas
- 1965–1966: Ilias Tsirimokos
- 1967: Grigorios Spandidakis
- 1967–1973: Stylianos Pattakos
- 1968–1971: Dimitrios Patilis
- 1971–1973: Nikolaos Makarezos
- 1973: Charilaos Mitrelias
- 1974: Georgios Mavros
- 1977–1981: Konstantinos Papakonstantinou
- 1981: Evangelos Averoff
- 1985–1988: Ioannis Charalambopoulos
- 1987–1988: Menios Koutsogiorgas
- 1990–1993: Tzannis Tzannetakis
- 1990–1992: Athanasios Kanellopoulos
- 2009–2012: Theodoros Pangalos
- 2011–2012: Evangelos Venizelos
- 2013–2015: Evangelos Venizelos
- 2015 (January–August): Yannis Dragasakis
- 2015–2019: Yannis Dragasakis
- 2019–2023: Panagiotis Pikrammenos
- 2025–present: Kostis Hatzidakis
