= Haulout (film) =

2022 short documentary film by Maxim Arbugaev and Evgenia Arbugaeva

- Official poster
- Russian: Выход
- Directed by: Maxim Arbugaev; Evgenia Arbugaeva
- Screenplay by: Maxim Arbugaev; Evgenia Arbugaeva
- Produced by: Maxim Arbugaev; Evgenia Arbugaeva
- Starring: Maxim Chakilev
- Cinematography: Maxim Arbugaev; Evgenia Arbugaeva
- Edited by: Evgenia Arbugaeva; Joshua Chadwick
- Production company: Albireo Films
- Distributed by: Rise and Shine; Gonella Productions
- Release date: February 2022 (Berlinale)
- Running time: 25 minutes
- Countries: United Kingdom; Russia
- Language: Russian

Haulout (Russian: Выход) is a 2022 Russian-British co-production short documentary film written, directed and produced by brother and sister duo Maxim Arbugaev, Evgenia Arbugaeva.

The documentary is about the Russian scientist Maxim Chakilev, who observes the life of walruses at Cape Heart-Stone in the Chukchi Sea. The international title of the film refers to the term hauling-out, which the science describes as the pinnipeds going ashore for resting or mating.

Produced by Albireo Films, the film had its world premiere in February 2022 at 72nd Berlin International Film Festival.

It was selected for Academy Award for Best Documentary Short Film and subsequently shortlisted and nominated for 95th Academy Awards in said category.

== Content ==
The film follows marine biologist Maxim Chakilev to his remote hut in Chukotka, nestled in the vast expanses of the Russian Arctic. Every autumn, he spends three months there. During his sojourn, at night the beach fills up with countless walruses year after year, but far too often ends in the death of some of the animals.

The oceanographer observes that the walruses need a rest period on land and also mate during that time. The warming of the sea and rising temperatures makes the ice recede, which results in the dwindling of living space available for them. Sometimes there are phases in which the water is completely ice-free.

We see raging seas, and are then confronted with an unmanageable crowd of walruses lying body to body. They are so dense that Chakilev is unable to leave his hut through the door and is forced to climb onto the roof of the building. The camera conveys to the viewer the enormous mass of animals pushing ashore. The researcher observing them is inferior to them in his position. A person also seems exceptionally small compared to the many animals and the forces of nature. The noise the walruses make is also nerve-racking. When it's all over, Chakilev can finally go out and count the animals that have been crushed by their own kind. He is sad because the number of deaths is increasing from year to year.

== Cast ==
- Maxim Chakilev (Marine Biologist)

== Production ==
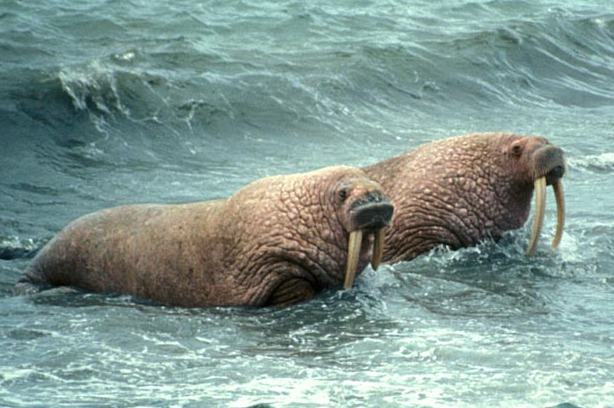
Two walruses go ashore

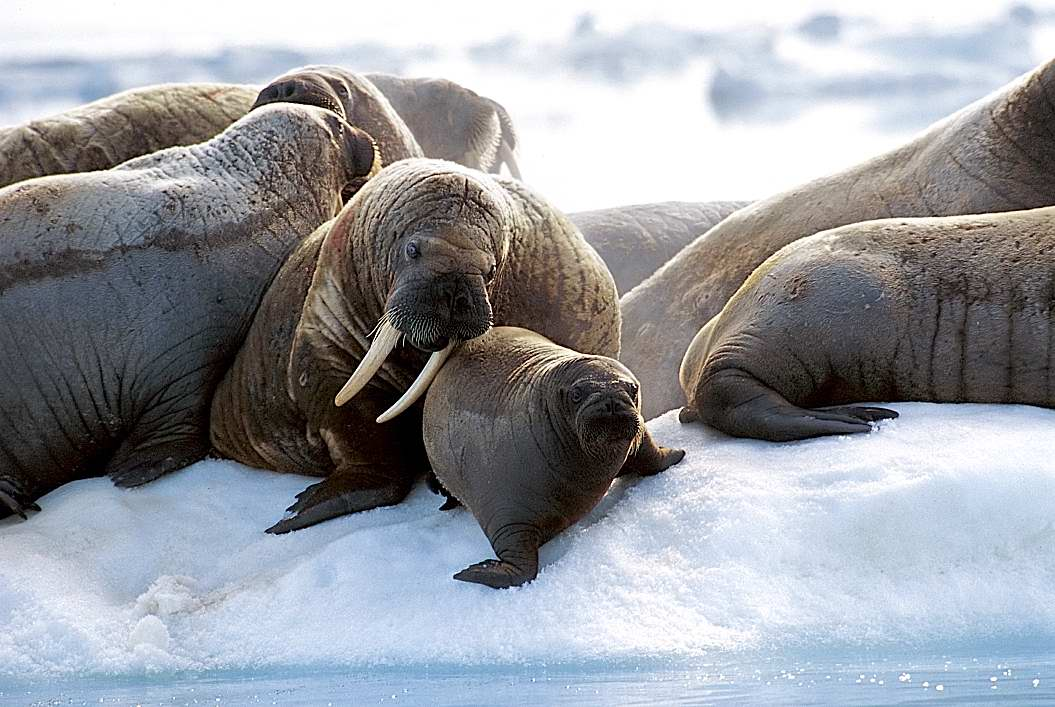
Walrus cow and calf in a herd

In 2018, the filmmakers Evgenia Arbugaeva and Maxim Arbugaev, a sister and brother duo, arrived on a strange beach, working on a photography project about Chukchi people. There they met a marine biologist, Maxim Chakilev, and his work became their documentary, Haulout, which they filmed in 2020. They filmed their documentary in the remote region of Chukotka, visiting walrus beach, called Cape Serdtse-Kamen, which translates to Cape Heart-Stone. Starting in mid-August, they stayed with Chakilev's covering his field season, until the first week of November. Incidentally, in 2020, there were record-high temperatures, and a record-high number of walrus deaths. In this three-month shoot, they were thrice surrounded by walruses tightly packed for about a week each time. They were unable to leave the hut and experienced claustrophobia and excruciating smells.

== Release ==
The film had its world premiere at the 72nd Berlin International Film Festival in February 2022, since then It has been featured in over 30 international venues. In June 2022, it was screened at Seoul International Eco Film Festival, and at Palm Springs International Festival of Short Films, where it won Special Jury and Special Mention Award respectively. In September, it was selected as opening film at International Documentary Film Festival Flahertiana, and was screened on 22 September 2022 in International Competition. It won Special Jury Mention award. In October 2022, it was screened at BFI London Film Festival in the "This is Planet Earth" section of short films.

It was shortlisted for Academy Award for Best Documentary Short Film.

== Reception ==
The film was featured in the American weekly magazine The New Yorker. Amber Wilkinson reviewing for Eye for Film rated the film with 4 stars out of 5 and wrote, "A melancholy tribute to Chakilev's dedication and further evidence of the damage the climate crisis is causing." Elisabeth Nagy reviewing for Riecks film reviews wrote that the focus of the film was on conveying the message of the climate change in the arctic sea, which was made clear with eerily beautiful pictures. Upcoming On Screen rated the film with 4 stars and stated that the tragic and sobering film is essential viewing. Elobrating, they wrote, "Haulout is a powerful documentary that shows the sheer overwhelming scale of the consequences of climate change on beautiful animals in the Arctic." Doreen Matthei reviewing at Berlinale graded the film 9/10 and wrote that Haulout is a portrait of a natural event giving out a strong plea for a better relationship with nature.

== Accolades ==
Award	Date of ceremony	Category	Recipient(s)	Result	Ref.
Seoul International Eco Film Festival	8 June 2022	Special Jury Award	Haulout	Won	
Palm Springs International Festival of Short Films	26 June 2022	Special Mention	Haulout	Won	
International Documentary Film Festival Flahertiana	23 September 2022	Special Mention	Haulout	Won	
Cork International Film Festival	20 November 2022	Grand Prix Documentary Short	Haulout	Won	
IDA Documentary Awards	10 December 2022	Best Short Documentary	Haulout	Won	
Academy Awards	12 March 2023	Best Documentary Short Film	Evgenia Arbugaeva, Maxim Arbugaev	Nominated	
Les Écrans de l'aventure	14 October 2023	Special Mention	Haulout	Won	

=== State honours ===
- Laurel branch-2022: Russian national award in the field of non-fiction films and television.
  - Best Non-Fiction Films of the Author: Haulout by Maxim Arbugaev and Evgenia Arbugaeva
