= Petros Koulaxidis =

Executed Greek serial killer

- Koulaxidis on death row
- Born: 1880; Russian Empire
- Died: August 3, 1932 (aged 51–52); Florina, Greece
- Cause of death: Execution by firing squad
- Other names: "The Vampire of Hamilos" "The Werewolf of Hamilos" "The Greek Bluebeard"
- Convictions: Murder; Assault
- Penalty: Death (murders); 3.5 years (assault)

Details
- Victims: 5+
- Span of crimes: 1917–1930
- Country: Greece, possibly Russia
- States: Kilkis, possibly Kherson and Kyiv
- Date apprehended: July 1930

Petros Koulaxidis (Greek: Πέτρος Κουλαξίδης; 1880 – August 3, 1932), known as The Vampire of Hamilos (Greek: βρυκόλαξ του Χαμηλού), was a Russian-born Greek serial killer and bigamist who killed at least five wives and girlfriends in Central Macedonia from 1917 to 1930. Confessing only to the final killing, which he claimed was done in the heat of the moment, Koulaxidis was convicted on all counts, sentenced to death and subsequently executed in 1932.

== Early life ==
Biographical information about Koulaxidis' early life is scarce. A Pontic Greek born in an undetermined region of the Russian Empire circa 1880, he was described as a charming and charismatic man, but also a womanizer with a very volatile personality and callous temper. It is claimed that Koulaxidis possibly claimed his first victims in Russia, since several of his love interests had died there - including a rich woman named Dubova in Kherson Oblast who kicked him out of the house and mysteriously died two weeks later, and a dancer named Marouska who was forced into prostitution in Kiev and then vanished - but as no official investigation took place, this remains speculatory.

Following the Russian Revolution, Koulaxidis emigrated to Greece, initially settling in Kavala, but he then started frequently moving around various settlements in Thessaloniki, Kilkis and Serres. During his stay at a small village in Kilkis, he married a woman named Kyriakoula and settled in a small house, but soon got involved in a fight with a fellow villager and was arrested. For this, he was sentenced to 3.5 years imprisonment, but was released early for good behavior.

== Murders and arrest ==
The day after his release, Koulaxidis returned to the village, and soon after, Kyriakoula was found dead. When questioned as to what had happened, Koulaxidis claimed that "she felt such joy from his return" that she suffered from a seizure and died. The villagers believed his claims and no further investigation took place. Six months later, Koulaxidis married Despina, the daughter of the village priest, but soon afterwards, she too died from what an autopsy determined was abdominal pains. This time, Koulaxidis claimed that his new wife died from stomach cancer, and since there was no evidence could disprove his claims, the matter was soon forgotten.

In 1930, Koulaxidis married again, this time to a woman named Efthymia. The newlyweds soon moved to Hamilos, a small village near the border with Bulgaria, where they lived together in relative peace for a short time. One day, however, Efthymia was found murdered in an old air raid shelter, but when local police went to inform Koulaxidis, they learned that he had left the area without telling anybody. When the couple's house was searched, authorities found several bloody knives, as well as numerous personal items and photographs depicting unknown women. Now considered the prime suspect in the murder, an arrest warrant was issued for Koulaxidis.

Unbeknownst to them, Koulaxidis had moved to another nearby village, Theodosia, where he was already planning his next wedding to another woman. However, his prospective father-in-law considered him way too mysterious and suspicious, and out of curiosity went around asking various villagers, policemen and farmers if they knew anything about him. When he inquired about him to the head of the local police department, the man was informed that an arrest warrant for murder had been issued in Koulaxidis' name. With this information, he led the authorities to Theodosia, where Koulaxidis was finally arrested.

== Trial, sentence, and imprisonment ==
A month after his arrest, Koulaxidis was put on trial for the murder of Efthymia. During the proceedings, numerous startling revelations occurred, as the prosecutors were able to confirm that he had had at least five known wives after his arrival in Greece, all of whom had died under suspicious circumstances. The first two confirmed were two women named Christina and Anatolia, who had supposedly died from influenza and another virus, respectively. There were also allegations that he had married and possibly killed numerous other women, perhaps as far back as his time living in Russia, but this could not be proven with certainty.

Koulaxidis denied most of the charges, with the only exception being the murder of his final wife, Efthymia, as his cousin Iakovos - who had helped him move the body - had already confessed to his part in the crime. However, Koulaxidis claimed that the murder was not premeditated, as he had caught her sleeping with their wedding's best man. Enraged by this, he got into a quarrel that resulted in him strangling Efthymia to death. This version of events was quickly dismissed by the courts, as a medical examiner determined that Efthymia's head had been crushed with a large stone, a cause of death that directly contradicted what Koulaxidis claimed had happened.

The trial lasted several days, and on November 8, 1931, Koulaxidis was found guilty on all counts and sentenced to death. In his closing statement, the prosecutor said that "society can only prosper when it is ruthlessly purged of such criminal bastards". Soon afterwards, Koulaxidis was transferred to the Heptapyrgion, which effectively served as the country's death row at the time.

== Execution ==
Nine months after his conviction, on August 3, 1932, Koulaxidis was brought to the execution grounds in Florina and executed by firing squad, along with three Communists convicted of killing an army officer. He reportedly spent his last day in prison singing patriotic songs and hymns, and while he was being escorted to the execution grounds, he sang a hymn dedicated to statesman Eleftherios Venizelos. Contemporary accounts claimed that Koulaxidis remained stoic and emotionless throughout the preparations, and that he had no final words.

It is claimed that for many years after his death, villagers in the region continued to be haunted by Koulaxidis's vicious acts and that the story of the "Vampire of Hamilos" continues to be told to this day.

== See also ==
- List of serial killers by country
