= Yiangos Pesmazoglou =

Greek politician

- Born: 1 March, 1918; Chios, Greece
- Died: 27 November, 2003; Athens, Greece

Ioannis Pesmazoglou (Greek: Ιωάννης Πεσμαζόγλου; 1 March 1918 – 27 November 2003), better known as Yiangos or Giangos Pesmazoglou (Greek: Γιάγκος Πεσμαζόγλου) was a Greek politician. He was well known for his activism against the Greek Military Junta (1967–1974) and his role in Greece's accession to the European Community in 1981.

== Early life ==
Pesmazoglou was born on the island of Chios on 1 March 1918. He studied law, Economics and Political Sciences at the University of Athens. After the Second World War, he completed a second doctorate in economics at St John's College, Cambridge. Upon his return to Greece, he taught Political Economy at the University of Athens.

== Political career ==
From 1951 to 1955, he served as Director General of the Ministry of Coordination in the government of Alexandros Papagos. In 1955, he began working as an economic advisor at the Bank of Greece. In 1958, he was appointed by the conservative prime minister Konstantinos Karamanlis to lead the team that negotiated the 1961 agreement with the EEC, which, in turn, prepared the way for Greece's accession to the European Community in 1981.

In 1965, Pesmazoglou became deputy governor of the Bank of Greece. In 1967, he lost his position at the Bank of Greece and his professorship at the University of Athens due to his opposition to the Greek Military Junta which came to power that year. He was described as a "fearless critic" of the Junta, openly criticising them in interviews with foreign journalists and testifying against them during trials of Junta opponents. He was the first president of the Society for the Study of Greek Problems (EMEP), which was founded to create a platform for critical debate during the dictatorial regime. In 1972, the Junta dissolved EMEP and exiled Pesmazoglou to the remote villages of Deskati and Thermo, while the following year he was arrested and imprisoned.

With the collapse of the Junta in 1974, he became the Minister of Finance in Karamanlis's Government of National Unity and participated in the 1974 elections with the Centre Union – New Forces, with which he was elected a member of parliament. In 1975, he was appointed by the Greek Parliament as chairman of the Committee for the Integration of Greece into the EEC. He was re-elected in 1977 with the Union of the Democratic Centre, while in 1979 he founded the Party of Democratic Socialism, with which he participated in the 1981 European elections, where he was elected as an MEP. He left the party in 1984, having failed to be re-elected. In 1989, he was re-elected as an MEP on the New Democracy ticket.

In 1977, he was proclaimed Archon Grand Orator of the Ecumenical Patriarchate. In 1992, he was elected a full member of the Academy of Athens, and became its president in 1996.

== Awards and honours ==
Pesmazoglou was honored many times by the State and by other bodies. In 1977, he was honored by the Greek State with the Order of the Phoenix.

== Personal life ==
He was married to Miranda Economou and had two sons. He died on 27 November 2003 and was buried in the First Cemetery of Athens.
