= Capital punishment in Greece =

Europe holds the greatest concentration of abolitionist states (blue). Map current as of 2022. Abolished for all offences Abolished in practice Retains capital punishment

Capital punishment in modern Greece was carried out using the guillotine (until 1913) or by firing squad. It was last applied in 1972 during the military junta. The death penalty was abolished in stages between 1975 and 2005.

== History ==
Executions during the Greek War of Independence were carried out by firing squad, although when the monarchy introduced the Penal Code in 1834, beheading by guillotine became the only mode of execution. In 1847, difficulties in making the guillotine available for every execution made the government establish the firing squad as an alternative mode of execution. Both would be used until the firing squad was established as the only means of execution in 1929 (the last execution by guillotine took place in 1913). Over 3,000 executions took place between 1946 and 1949 during the Greek Civil War. The last execution took place on 25 August 1972, when the 27-year-old Vassilis Lymberis was shot by firing squad for the murder of his wife, mother-in-law and two children (he burned them alive inside their house) on the island of Crete.

The three leading members of the Greek junta, Georgios Papadopoulos, Stylianos Pattakos, and Nikolaos Makarezos were sentenced to death for mutiny during the Greek Junta Trials, but these sentences were commuted to life imprisonment by the Karamanlis government. The 1975 Constitution abolished the death penalty for non-complex political crimes under article 7, paragraph 3.

In 1993, Law 2172 removed the capital punishment from the Criminal Code. Until then, offenders could be sentenced to death (for example, Kyriakos Papachronis was twice sentenced to death in 1984) but in practice all death sentences were commuted to life imprisonment. Four years later, Greece ratified the Second Optional Protocol to the International Covenant on Civil and Political Rights, aiming at the abolition of the death penalty; however, a reservation was made allowing for death penalty use for the most serious crimes, i.e. high treason, committed during wartime. Protocol No. 6 to the European Convention on Human Rights (ECHR), providing for the abolition of the death penalty in peacetime, was ratified in 1998. The Greek constitutional amendment of 2001 amended article 7, abolishing the death penalty except in the cases provided by law for felonies perpetrated in time of war and related thereto.

In 2004, Law 3289 On the Ratification of Protocol No. 13 to of the ECHR, concerning the abolition of the death penalty in all circumstances removed all relevant provisions from the Military Penal code and the Regulation on the external service of troops (its article 17 concerning the carrying out of executions). In 2005, Greece ratified Protocol No. 13 to the ECHR, concerning the abolition of the death penalty under all circumstances.

The Golden Dawn party called in 2013 for the restoration of the death penalty for immigrants convicted of violent crimes.
