= Charilaos Mitrelias =

Greek jurist and politician

- Χαρίλαος Μητρέλιας

Deputy Prime Minister of Greece
- In office 8 October 1973 – 25 November 1973
- Prime Minister: Spyros Markezinis
- Preceded by: Stylianos Pattakos; Nikolaos Makarezos
- Succeeded by: Georgios Mavros

Personal details
- Born: 1897 Lesbos, Ottoman Empire
- Died: 16 May 1988 (aged 90–91) Athens, Greece

Charilaos Mitrelias (Greek: Χαρίλαος Μητρέλιας; 1897–1988) was a Greek jurist and politician. He began a long career at the Council of State in 1929, culminating in his service as its president from 1961 until his retirement in 1966. He then served as Deputy Prime Minister in the government of Spyros Markezinis, a failed attempt to enact a transition to democracy during the Greek military junta of 1967–1974.

Political offices
Preceded by Stylianos Pattakos and Nikolaos Makarezos	Deputy Prime Minister of Greece; 8 October – 25 November 1973	Vacant Title next held by Georgios Mavros (in the August 1974 National unity government)
Legal offices
Preceded by Sotirios Souliotis	President of the Council of State; 1961–1966	Succeeded by Michail Stasinopoulos
