= Party of Democratic Socialism (Greece) =

Party of Democratic Socialism Κόμμα Δημοκρατικού Σοσιαλισμού
- Leader: Yiangos Pesmazoglou
- Founded: 11 January 1979
- Dissolved: 1989
- Split from: Union of the Democratic Centre
- Merged into: Synaspismos
- Ideology: Social democracy Social liberalism Radicalism
- Political position: Centre-left

The Party of Democratic Socialism (KODISO; Greek: Κόμμα Δημοκρατικού Σοσιαλισμού (ΚΟΔΗΣΟ), Komma Dimokratikou Sosialismou) is a former centre-left political party in Greece founded in 1979 by former members of the Union of the Democratic Centre (EDIK). Its first president was Yiangos Pesmazoglou. The KODISO was dissolved in 1989 into Synaspismos.

== History ==
The party participated in the 1981 legislative election in a coalition with Peasants and Workers Party, in which it gained 0.7% of the vote. In the 1981 European Parliament election, it earned a seat for its president Yiangos Pesmazoglou. The party was noted for its pro-European Union stance.

In the 1984 European Parliament election, the party won 0.8% of the vote and Pesmazoglou resigned. He was succeeded by Babis Protopapas. Shortly before the 1985 legislative election, the withdrawal of Sotiris Kouvelas and Virginia Tsouderou led the party to participate with New Democracy.

In 1986, the party chose a more leftist direction resulting in it becoming one of the parties which created the Coalition of the Left and Progress, also known as Synaspismos, in 1989.

== See also ==
- Synaspismos
