= Filippos Mavros =

Greek politician

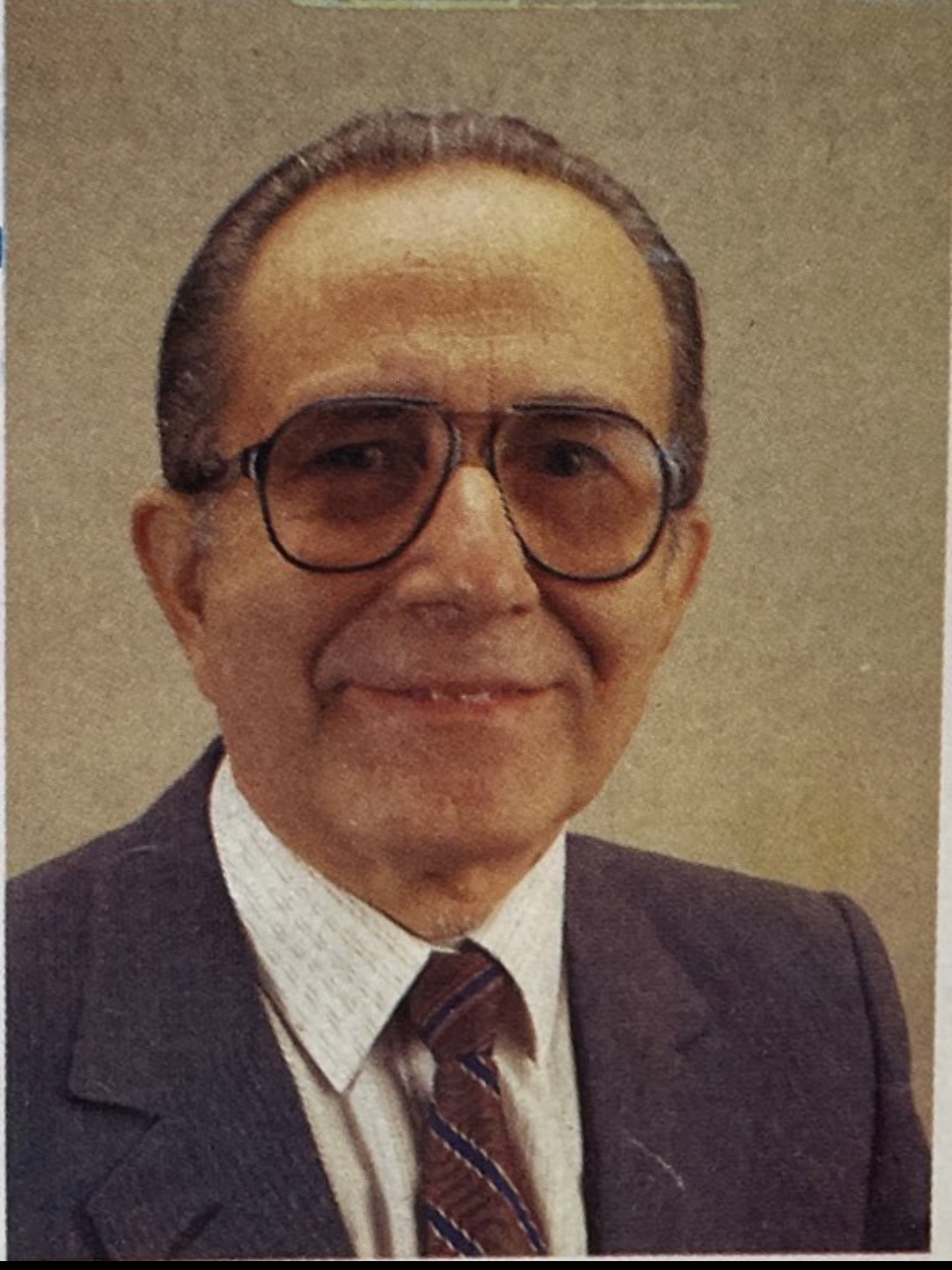
Filippos Mavros

Filippos Mavros (Greek: Φίλιππος Μαύρος, January 24, 1921 - December 22, 2016) was a Greek politician from Kastellorizo. He was the youngest son of Ioannis Mavros and brother of Georgios Mavros. He worked as a merchant and made his debut in politics in 1961, when he was elected as a Member of Parliament with the Centre Union in the Athens B electoral district. He was reelected in 1963 and 1964 with the Centre Union. He was again elected in the period 1974-1977 with the party of his brother, Centre Union – New Forces, later known as the Union of the Democratic Centre, in the Former Municipality of Athens–Remainder district. He was married with Lydia Papathanasiou with whom he had three daughters.
