= 1981 Greek parliamentary election =

- 18 October 1981

All 300 seats in the Hellenic Parliament 151 seats needed for a majority
- Registered: 7,059,778
- Turnout: 81.50% (▼0.39pp)
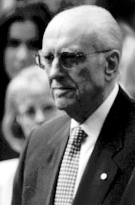

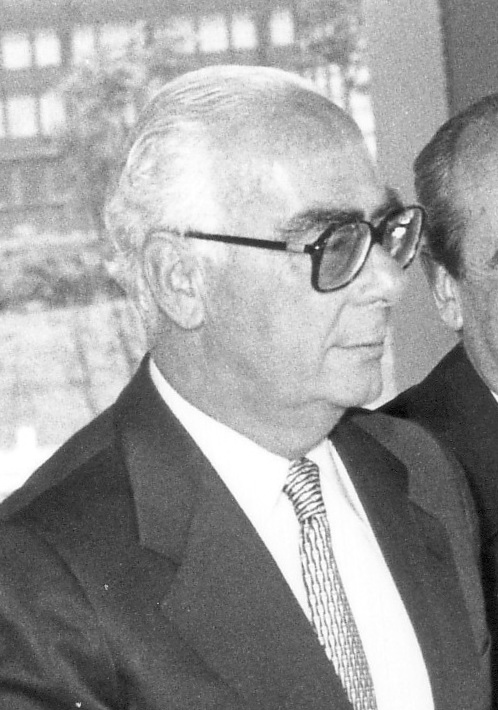

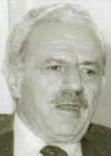
	First party	Second party	Third party
Leader	Andreas Papandreou	Georgios Rallis	Charilaos Florakis
Party	PASOK	ND	KKE
Last election	25.34%, 93 seats	41.84%, 171 seats	9.36%, 11 seats
Seats won	172	115	13
Seat change	▲79	▼56	▲2
Popular vote	2,726,309	2,034,496	620,302
Percentage	48.07%	35.88%	10.94%
Swing	▲22.73 pp	▼5.96 pp	▲1.58 pp
Prime Minister before election
Georgios Rallis
ND
Prime Minister after election
Andreas Papandreou
PASOK

Parliamentary elections were held in Greece on Sunday, 18 October 1981. PASOK, led by Andreas Papandreou, faced New Democracy, led by Georgios Rallis. Papandreou achieved a landslide victory and PASOK formed the first socialist government in the history of Greece (in 1963 Centrists had formed a government under the leadership of George Papandreou, Andreas' father, but their party, Centre Union, was not a socialist party but a centrist, social-liberal one).

Observers had expected a PASOK victory but were surprised by the size of the victory.

185 of the 300 seats were won by PASOK or the Communist Party: both openly eurosceptic. This was the high point of Greek euroscepticism, coming just months after the country's accession to the European Communities.

== Results ==
Party	Votes	%	Seats	+/–
PASOK	2,726,309	48.07	172	+79
New Democracy	2,034,496	35.88	115	–56
Communist Party of Greece	620,302	10.94	13	+2
Progressive Party	95,799	1.69	0	New
Communist Party of Greece (Interior)	76,404	1.35	0	New
KODISO–KAE	40,126	0.71	0	New
Union of the Democratic Centre	22,763	0.40	0	–16
Liberal Party	20,645	0.36	0	New
Christian Democracy	8,638	0.15	0	New
For a Revolutionary Left	6,595	0.12	0	New
EKKE – M-L KKE	4,700	0.08	0	0
International Workers' Union – Trotskyists	1,646	0.03	0	0
Democratic Social Party	1,100	0.02	0	New
Byzantine National Organisation	407	0.01	0	New
Olympic Democracy	95	0.00	0	0
Hellenic Universal Olympic Democracy	5	0.00	0	New
National Refugee Party of Greece "Kimon"	2	0.00	0	New
Independents	11,025	0.19	0	0
Total	5,671,057	100.00	300	0
Valid votes	5,671,057	98.57		
Invalid/blank votes	82,421	1.43		
Total votes	5,753,478	100.00		
Registered voters/turnout	7,059,778	81.50		
Source: Nohlen & Stöver

=== By constituency ===
Constituency	PASOK		ND		KKE		KP		KKE-ES (Note: Compared to Alliance)	
Constituency	%	±	%	±	%	±	%	±	%	±
Achaea	55.92	▲18.66	30.62	▼9.38	9.19	▲1.05	1.81	New	1.04	▼0.98
Aetolia-Akarnania	48.33	▲22.17	39.90	▼9.34	9.31	▲1.73	1.07	New	0.65	▼0.60
Argolis	44.53	▲19.03	46.83	▲0.82	5.29	▲1.84	1.79	New	0.69	▼0.30
Arkadia	44.91	▲23.46	42.90	▼5.84	7.45	▲2.42	3.32	New	0.77	▼0.34
Arta	42.41	▲14.50	46.52	▲7.20	9.26	▲2.40	0.72	New	0.76	▼0.43
Athens A	44.44	▲21.86	34.42	▼8.41	12.63	▲1.12	2.12	New	3.26	▼2.74
Athens B	48.73	▲21.15	26.36	▼9.78	18.04	▲1.95	1.51	New	2.75	▼2.43
Attica	49.58	▲21.51	34.85	▼10.25	10.73	▲3.11	1.08	New	0.87	▼0.93
Boeotia	52.86	▲21.90	35.05	▼4.35	9.16	▲1.79	1.09	New	1.07	▼0.64
Cephalonia	42.56	▲18.51	32.96	▼6.71	17.32	▲4.26	0.58	New	1.21	▼0.91
Chalkidiki	45.97	▲20.66	45.85	▼6.97	5.50	▲1.34	0.87	New	0.81	▼0.86
Chania	55.26	▲31.82	25.11	▲9.10	11.96	▲1.29	0.31	New	0.80	▼1.18
Chios	48.97	▲33.30	42.68	▼5.08	6.18	▲0.78	0.52	New	1.01	▼1.13
Corfu	50.78	▲18.71	34.04	▼1.40	11.62	▲1.59	0.30	New	1.45	▼1.42
Corinthia	50.91	▲21.05	40.31	▼6.78	4.61	▲0.73	2.38	New	0.76	▼0.73
Cyclades	47.02	▲24.10	45.75	▼9.20	4.56	▲1.11	1.10	New	0.67	▼1.71
Dodecanese	58.19	▲30.48	30.29	▼11.03	4.89	▲2.17	0.48	New	0.80	▼0.35
Drama	48.47	▲21.19	43.74	▲4.08	4.51	▲0.91	0.88	New	0.74	▼0.77
Elis	52.20	▲21.20	40.44	▲5.20	5.71	▲2.01	0.43	New	0.52	▼0.43
Euboea	55.05	▲27.37	32.07	▼10.65	7.50	▲2.22	1.78	New	0.63	▼0.32
Evros	45.82	▲24.06	40.85	▼13.88	5.38	▲1.68	6.03	New	0.73	▼0.97
Evrytania	53.16	▲24.72	41.23	▼5.20	4.23	▲1.18	0.70	New	0.36	▼0.19
Florina	39.51	▲23.89	48.69	▲1.66	6.63	▲1.83	3.81	New	0.63	▼0.30
Grevena	47.92	▲29.83	34.17	▲1.73	12.31	▲4.26	3.72	New	0.96	▼0.06
Heraklion	65.90	▲30.54	19.20	▼5.70	8.46	▲1.23	0.16	New	0.84	▼1.31
Imathia	50.23	▲19.61	36.06	▼7.28	10.21	▲1.76	1.63	New	0.84	▼1.19
Ioannina	45.81	▲21.03	39.88	▼6.38	11.68	▲3.57	0.76	New	1.13	▼1.38
Karditsa	43.85	▲17.29	40.97	▲4.45	12.14	▲1.18	1.45	New	0.75	▼0.26
Kastoria	39.78	▲20.29	52.36	▲8.15	4.18	▲1.36	1.01	New	0.64	▼0.38
Kavala	48.58	▲25.28	38.86	▼11.64	8.81	▲1.37	1.08	New	1.04	▼2.79
Kilkis	40.66	▲17.05	41.85	▼1.13	11.21	▲1.01	4.43	New	0.88	▼0.79
Kozani	45.09	▲21.39	44.11	▼5.71	7.46	▲1.86	1.44	New	0.82	▼0.95
Laconia	34.32	▲18.09	53.80	▼1.20	5.50	▲1.33	4.77	New	0.58	▼0.30
Larissa	45.06	▲22.75	36.20	▼0.70	15.30	▲0.24	1.45	New	1.02	▼1.29
Lasithi	63.24	▲37.06	29.25	▼0.36	5.74	▲1.55			0.42	▼0.25
Lefkada	39.86	▲23.28	37.59	▲5.70	19.04	▲0.99	0.42	New	2.22	▼2.30
Lesbos	39.90	▲19.11	31.39	▼11.38	26.04	▲1.67	0.57	New	1.43	▼0.77
Magnesia	46.39	▲26.85	35.27	▼7.15	14.48	▼0.04	1.00	New	1.23	▼2.09
Messenia	42.11	▲18.74	45.80	▲1.37	8.20	▲2.12	2.79	New	0.61	▼0.25
Pella	50.69	▲19.51	39.42	▼4.79	6.10	▲1.54	2.18	New	0.62	▼0.74
Phocis	46.30	▲22.34	43.23	▼11.65	6.54	▲1.64	2.31	New	0.64	▼0.38
Phthiotis	48.34	▲25.66	39.89	▼4.08	7.44	▲1.70	2.95	New	0.76	▼0.35
Pieria	48.06	▲24.25	40.79	▼3.25	7.71	▲1.15	2.19	New	0.78	▼1.12
Piraeus A	48.17	▲24.30	34.17	▼9.76	12.20	▲1.16	1.15	New	1.92	▼2.28
Piraeus B	51.16	▲24.69	23.09	▼9.32	21.28	▲1.94	0.60	New	2.09	▼3.09
Preveza	46.18	▲11.81	41.13	▼3.08	10.30	▲2.85	1.15	New	0.91	▼0.30
Rethymno	51.15	▲26.87	24.67	▼4.82	5.58	▲1.01			0.59	▼0.27
Rhodope	50.83	▲34.15	39.86	▲4.13	4.11	▲1.62	2.08	New	0.52	▼0.26
Samos	33.79	▲22.91	41.21	▼2.18	21.12	▲3.54			2.50	▼0.57
Serres	45.30	▲22.20	44.05	▼8.50	7.54	▲0.64	1.29	New	0.72	▼1.10
Thesprotia	55.68	▲25.13	34.76	▲0.66	7.27	▲2.72	0.92	New	0.91	▲0.16
Thessaloniki A	47.63	▲25.51	32.82	▼12.98	13.10	▲1.12	2.05	New	2.08	▼3.43
Thessaloniki B	46.75	▲19.20	38.56	▼7.63	10.53	▲0.52	2.03	New	0.83	▼1.20
Trikala	48.02	▲25.68	35.04	▼2.14	13.73	▲1.63	1.73	New	0.85	▼0.28
Xanthi	34.84	▲12.39	36.82	▼7.04	2.78	▲0.71	8.24	New	0.73	▼0.30
Zakynthos	43.12	▲22.73	37.09	▲0.76	15.83	▲0.04	1.90	New	1.40	▼0.60

== Aftermath ==
Papandreou's new government introduced several reforms in the wake of its victory (legalization of civil wedding, new family law, nationalization of certain private companies, etc.).

The main opposition party, New Democracy, faced serious internal conflicts. Georgios Rallis was forced to resign after the defeat, and he was succeeded by Evangelos Averoff, former minister under Karamanlis' governments. In 1984, Averof resigned because of health problems, and Konstantinos Mitsotakis became the new leader of New Democracy. Noteworthy, Mitsotakis and Papandreou were both centrists before 1967 and they belonged to the same party, George Papandreou's Center Union. Nevertheless, they were strong opponents, and they never liked each other. Papandreou was calling Mitsotakis "a defector, an apostate", because in 1965 he defected from the ruling Center Union and participated in a new government pleasing to Constantine II, who had just accepted George Papandreou's resignation after a serious disagreement between the King and the prime minister.
