= Peasants and Workers Party =

Former Greek political party

Peasants and Workers Party (Greek: Κόμμα Αγροτών και Εργαζομένων, KAE; KAE) was a political party in Greece. The party was allied with the Party of Democratic Socialism (KODISO). The party contested the 1981 parliamentary election on a joint ticket with KODISO. The KODISO-KAE ticket got 40,126 votes (0.71%). The alliance did, however, fare much better in the European Parliament election, where it got 241,666 votes (4.26%).
