= Vassilis Lymberis =

Executed Greek mass murderer

- Βασίλης Λυμπέρης
- Born: 1945; Greece
- Died: 25 August 1972 (aged 27); Heraklion, Crete, Greece
- Relatives: Vasiliki Lymberis (wife); Panagiota Lymberis (daughter); George Lymberis (son); Antigoni Markou (mother-in-law)
- Status: Executed by firing squad
- Conviction: Murder (4 counts)
- Penalty: Death

Details
- Date: 4–5 January 1972
- Country: Greece
- Killed: 4

Vassilis Lymberis (Greek: Βασίλης Λυμπέρης; 1945 – 25 August 1972) was a Greek mass murderer who killed his wife, his two children, and his mother-in-law, by burning down his family home in January 1972. Lymberis was executed for the crime via firing squad, and was the last person to be executed by Greece prior to the abolition of capital punishment.

== Crime ==
The 27-year-old Lymberis was sentenced to death, as he was found guilty by the Athens Court of Appeal (Criminal Court) on the charge of burning people alive. He murdered the following:

- His estranged wife, Vasiliki Lymberis, 24 years old
- His mother-in-law, Antigoni Markou, 55 years old
- His daughter, Panagiota Lymberis, 2½ years old
- His son, George Lymberis, 1 year old

The incident occurred on the night of 4 January 1972, and the early hours of 5 January 1972, at the victims' house in Chalandri, while the perpetrator had three friends as accomplices in the crime. The mother-in-law and the children died instantly, but his wife survived until noon on 5 January and it was she who reported the incident from the hospital. The case was a matter of intense public interest at the time.

At the end of the hearing on 6 May 1972, Lymberis was sentenced to death four times (for each of the victims separately), as was one of his accomplices (17-year-old Pavlos Angelopoulos), while the other two were sentenced to shorter sentences.

== Execution ==
The execution of Lymberis took place at dawn on 25 August 1972, at the firing range of the Reserve Infantry Officers School (SEAP), in the area of Two Aorakia in Heraklion, Crete. Lymberis was killed by a 12-man firing squad (only six guns contained live ammunition), while he had been a prisoner in the Halicarnassus prison. A few hours before the execution, the man on death row had been allowed to write a letter to his mother. Earlier, an application had been made by his lawyers to the Clemency Council to pardon him, but the application was unanimously rejected.

On the same day and at the same time the other convicted for the same case, Pavlos Angelopoulos, was to be executed in Corfu. Earlier, an application had also been filed for him to the Clemency Council, which was also rejected, but by a vote of 4 to 3. The council's opinion was signed by the Minister of Justice, Angelos Tsoukalas, but not ratified by the Regent (i.e. the dictator Papadopoulos). Eventually, on the grounds of his young age (he had not reached the age of 18 at the time of the crime) the execution was suspended, and in 1975 it was commuted to life imprisonment. In the mid-1990s he was pardoned and released from prison, having spent over 20 years in prison.

== Aftermath ==
The incident of the murder was transferred to the cinema the same year, as a film was made called, The Satanic Night, directed by Marios Retchila and produced by James Parrish. The role of Vassilis Lymberis was played by Yannis Katranis.

After the execution, the courts continued to sentence people to death, but ultimately, no one was executed until the final abolition of the death penalty by the government of Andreas Papandreou in December 1993.

== See also ==
- Capital punishment in Greece
- List of most recent executions by jurisdiction

== Sources ==
- Πρωτοσέλιδα και εσωτερικές σελίδες εφημερίδας «Μακεδονία», Ιανουάριος, Μάιος και Αύγουστος 1972, Ψηφιακή συλλογή εφημερίδων Εθνικής Βιβλιοθήκης της Ελλάδος
- «Υπόθεση Λυμπέρη» – Η τελευταία εκτέλεση στην Ελλάδα
