= Andreas Apostolidis =

Greek filmmaker

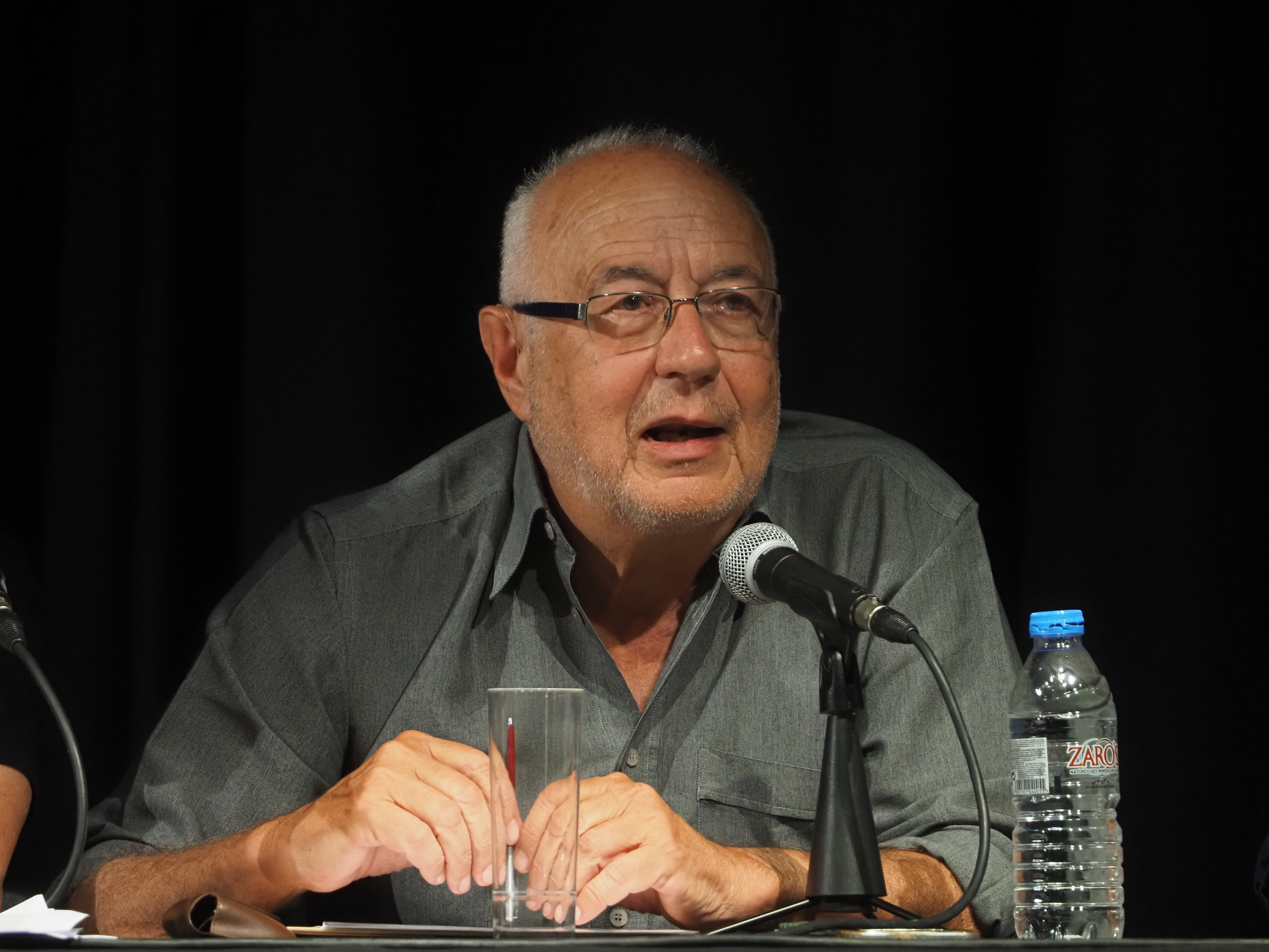
- Born: Andreas Apostolidis; 17 October 1939 (age 86); Greece
- Occupations: Crime novelist, Documentary director, Screenwriter
- Years active: 1985–present

Andreas Apostolidis (Greek: Ανδρέας Αποστολίδης) is a Greek crime novelist, documentary director and screenwriter. He is best known for the television work Reportage Without Frontiers and Tanzanian documentary A Place Without People.

== Career ==
In 1986 he directed, wrote and produced his debut short film Gri kyrioi. After the success of the film, he made the sequel of the short titled Gri kyrioi 2 in 1990. Then in 1999, he made his film debut by directing the film Dirty Greeks. In 2005, Apostolidis directed his maiden documentary The Ring. In 2002 he directed the documentary Death Match and then made a documentary about the illegal trade of antiquities titled Network in 2006.

After that, he moved to direct many television series documentaries such as Dyo fores xenos (2010), and 1821 (2011). In 2007, he directed over 125 episodes of the television documentary series Reportage Without Frontiers produced by Stelios Kouloglou. The serial later won the Best Documentary Award of the Year in Greece for record six consecutive years.

In 2010, he directed the critics acclaimed documentary A Place Without People which is based on Tanzania and its forests and native culture. The film received critics acclaim. In May 2010, at the Green Film Festival in Seoul, the film won the Jury Award as well as nominated at several film festivals.

== Filmography ==
Year	Film	Role	Genre	Ref.
1986	Gri kyrioi	Director, writer, producer	Short film	
1990	Gri kyrioi 2	Director, writer, producer, cinematographer	Short film	
1995	Skorpios	Writer	TV series	
1999	Dirty Greeks	Director	Film	
2005	The Ring	Director, writer	Documentary	
2007	Reportage Without Frontiers	Director	TV series documentary	
2010	A Place Without People	Director, writer	Documentary	
2010	Dyo fores xenos	Director, writer	TV series documentary	
2011	1821	Director, writer	TV series documentary	
2012	Silent Balkans	Director, writer	Documentary	
2012	A Tomb Raider in Cyprus	Writer	Documentary short	
2012	A Treasure of Gold	Writer	Documentary short	
2012	The Tomb of the Hidden Mummies	Writer	Documentary short	
2015	War & Peace in the Balkans	Director, writer	Documentary	
2019	Citizen Europe	Director	Film	
2021	Novela negra - Le polar latino	Director	TV movie documentary	
