= Evgenia Arbugaeva =

Photographer of the Russian Arctic (born 1985)

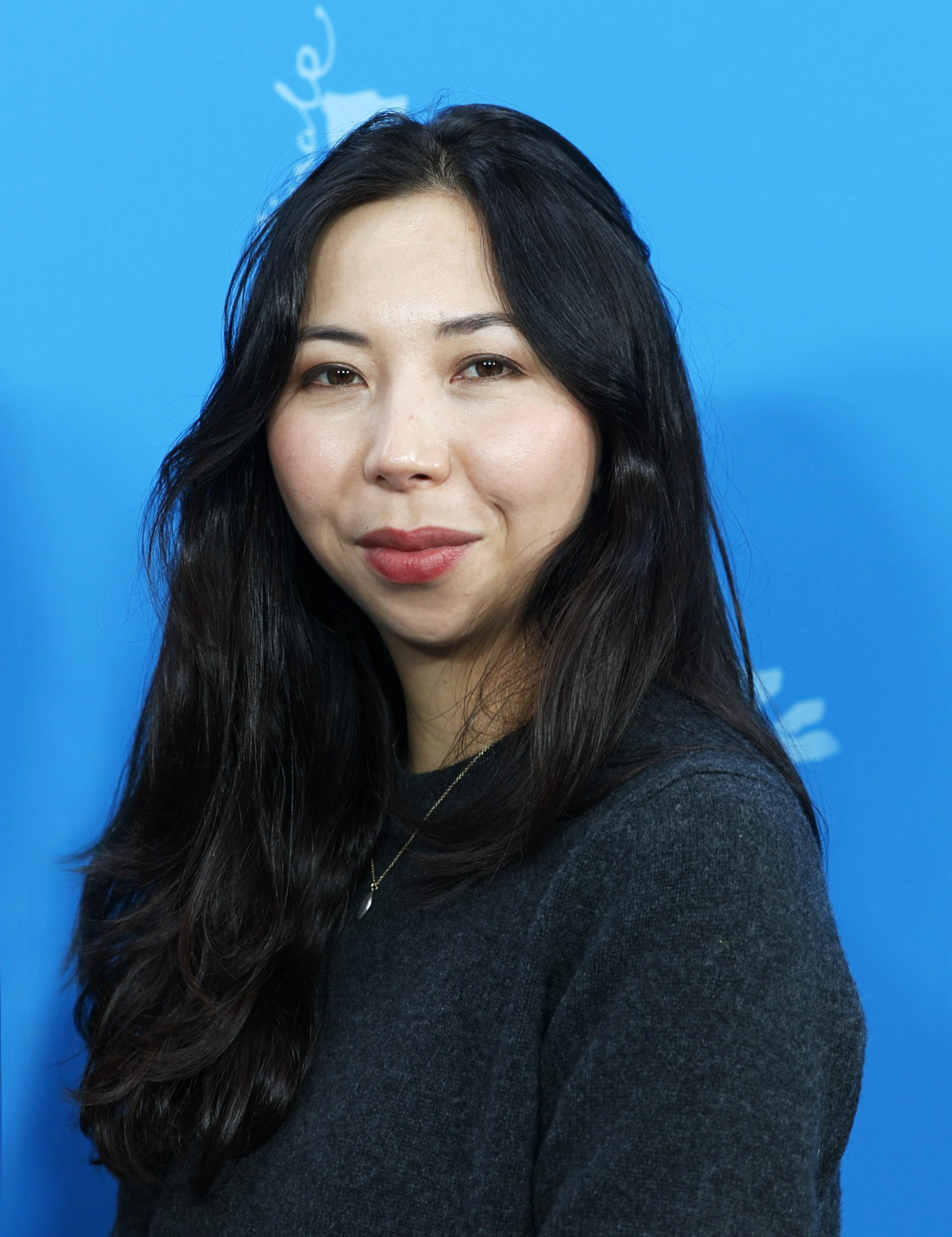
- Arbugaeva in 2026
- Born: 1985 (age 40–41); Tiksi, Yakut ASSR, Russian SFSR, Soviet Union
- Occupation: Photographer
- Known for: Photography of the Russian Arctic

Evgenia Arbugaeva (born 1985) is a photographer of the Russian Arctic. She grew up in Yakutsk and several of her photographic projects have involved people living in that area. National Geographic has funded her to photograph the people and economic changes on Russia's northern coast. Winner of the national Crystal Compass award.

== Early life and education ==
Arbugaeva was born in Tiksi, a small port town of the Sakha Republic on the Arctic Sea near the mouth of the Lena River. One of her childhood heroes was explorer Jacques Cousteau. At the age of eight, she and her family moved to Yakutsk. She studied management in Moscow before moving to New York City. There, she studied photography at the International Center of Photography, graduating in 2009. 19 years after moving from her hometown, Arbugaeva moved back to Tiksi.

== Photography ==
Arbugaeva's photographic method involves living with her subjects long enough to become friends with them so they relax in front of her camera. For one of her projects, she traveled with Siberian hunters for the tusks of mammoths, newly exposed by global warming; she won the trust of the hunters by stitching up the injured hand of the head of the group. She often works without a camera, scouting locations that she returns to frequently until the lighting and inspiration combine for a photo.

In 2010, when Arbugaeva returned to Tiksi, then becoming a ghost town, she photographed a teenage girl playing on the seashore. Inspired by the photo, she traveled back to Tiksi in 2011 to meet the girl and her family and to document their daily life. Despite the decline of the town and the difficulty of life there (which drove her host family to plan their own departure), her photos in this project are "bright and whimsical, their compositions and vivid colours redolent of the books she read there as a child."

Arbugaeva learned of the weather stations of northern Russia in a dog sledding incident, when she and her father had to take shelter from bad weather at one of the stations. In her project "Weather Man", she took a two-month journey on an icebreaker to 22 of the stations, including the station at Khodovarikha, where she met at took a portrait of meteorologist Vyacheslav Korotki. In early 2014, she returned to Khodovarikha by helicopter for a two-and-a-half-week visit and photography session with Korotki. Based on this work, a much darker series of photos than the ones from Tiksi, she published a profile of Korotki in The New Yorker.

Arbugaeva's other projects have included photographing nomadic Yakut reindeer herders in Sakha and "Amani", a sequence of fictionalized images set on an abandoned anthropological research station on a former German coffee plantation in Tanzania.

== Recognition ==
Arbugaeva was the 2013 winner of the Leica Oskar Barnack Award for her work in Tiksi, for which she also received a Magnum Emergency Fund in 2012. In 2018, National Geographic named her as one of their four inaugural Media Innovation Fellows, funding her to photograph the people and economic changes on Russia's northern coast.

In 2022, her short documentary film Haulout, made with her brother Maxim Arbugaev, was featured by The New Yorker. It won Best Short Documentary award at the IDA Documentary Awards, and was nominated for the Academy Award for Best Documentary Short Film.
