= Georgios Mavros =

Greek jurist and politician

- Γεώργιος Μαύρος
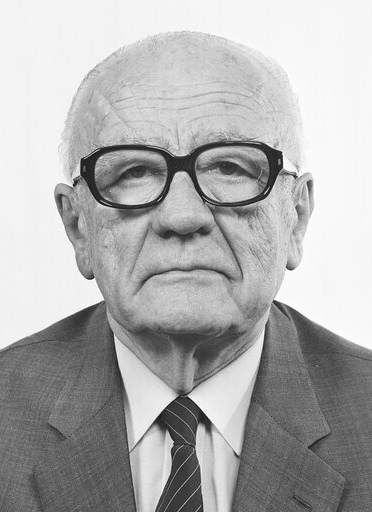
- Mavros as MEP, 1984

Leader of the Opposition
- In office 21 November 1974 – 28 November 1977
- Prime Minister: Konstantinos Karamanlis
- Preceded by: First of the Third Hellenic Republic
- Succeeded by: Andreas Papandreou

Deputy Prime Minister of Greece
- In office 24 July 1974 – 17 October 1974
- Prime Minister: Konstantinos Karamanlis
- Preceded by: Charilaos Mitrelias (1973)
- Succeeded by: Konstantinos Papakonstantinou (1977)
Ministerial Portfolios
Minister of Foreign Affairs
In office 24 July 1974 – 17 October 1974
Prime Minister	Konstantinos Karamanlis
Preceded by	Spyridon Tetenes; Konstantinos Kypraios (acting)
Succeeded by	Dimitrios Bitsios
Minister for Government Coordination
In office 19 February 1964 – 4 June 1964
Prime Minister	Georgios Papandreou
Preceded by	Ioannis Paraskevopoulos
Succeeded by	Stefanos Stefanopoulos; Georgios Papandreou (provisional)
In office 8 November 1963 – 31 December 1963
Prime Minister	Georgios Papandreou
Preceded by	Ioannis Paraskevopoulos
Succeeded by	Ioannis Paraskevopoulos
Provisional; 30 September 1951 – 27 October 1951
Prime Minister	Sofoklis Venizelos
Preceded by	Emmanouil Tsouderos
Succeeded by	Georgios Kartalis
Minister for National Defence
In office 24 July 1952 – 11 October 1952
Prime Minister	Nikolaos Plastiras
Preceded by	Sofoklis Venizelos
Succeeded by	Ioannis Pitsikas
Minister of Finance
In office 19 March 1951 – 27 October 1951
Prime Minister	Sofoklis Venizelos
Preceded by	Stavros Kostopoulos
Succeeded by	Chrysos Evelpidis
Minister of Justice
Acting; 4 July 1951 – 30 July 1951
Prime Minister	Sofoklis Venizelos
Preceded by	Ilias Lagakos
Succeeded by	Angelos Bouropoulos
In office 2 February 1946 – 4 April 1946
Prime Minister	Themistoklis Sofoulis
Preceded by	Georgios Oikonomopoulos; Konstantinos Rentis (provisional)
Succeeded by	Apostolos Alexandris; Konstantinos Tsaldaris (provisional)
Minister of National Economy
In office 14 April 1949 – 6 January 1950
Prime Minister	Themistoklis Sofoulis; Alexandros Diomidis
Preceded by	Athanasios Kapsalis; Georgios Melas (provisional)
Succeeded by	Ioannis Papakyriakopoulos
Minister of National Education
Provisional; 11 March 1946 – 4 April 1946
Prime Minister	Themistoklis Sofoulis
Preceded by	Georgios Athanasiadis-Novas
Succeeded by	Konstantinos Tsaldaris (provisional)

Personal details
- Born: 15 March 1909 Kastellorizo, Greece
- Died: 6 May 1995 (aged 86) Athens, Greece
- Party: Liberal Party (until 1961); Centre Union (1961–1974); Centre Union – New Forces (1974–1976); Union of the Democratic Centre (1976–c.1981); PASOK (from c.1981)
- Relatives: Filippos Mavros (brother)

Georgios Mavros (Greek: Γεώργιος Μαύρος) (Kastellorizo, 15 March 1909 – Athens, 6 May 1995) was a Greek jurist and politician. He served in several ministerial posts, and was Minister for Foreign Affairs and Deputy Prime Minister in the 1974 national unity government following the restoration of democracy.

He taught law at the University of Athens from 1937 to 1942, and became a politician following the liberation of Greece from the Axis Occupation, being elected to the Hellenic Parliament from 1946 on. During the occupation he helped rescue Jews from the Holocaust. In 1994 he was awarded the title of Righteous Among the Nations by Yad Vashem.

He held cabinet posts as Justice Minister (1946), Minister for National Education (1946), National Economy (1949), Finance (1951), National Defence (1952) and Government Coordination (1963–1965).

He was governor of the National Bank of Greece, and in 1966 established the National Bank of Greece Cultural Foundation (MIET). After the Greek military junta of 1967–1974, as part of the Centre Union – New Forces he served as Minister for Foreign Affairs and Deputy Prime Minister of Greece under Prime Minister Konstantinos Karamanlis. Increasingly sidelined by Karamanlis' New Democracy, Mavros joined the Panhellenic Socialist Movement and was elected an MP with it in 1981, and an MEP in 1984.
