= Stavros Karampelas =

Greek politician

Stavros Karampelas is a Greek politician and currently the President of the Greek political party Enosi Dimokratikou Kentrou (Union of the Democratic Centre).

== Biography ==
He was born in Petroupoli (Athens) in July 1973. He studied Political Sciences and Public Administration at the Panteion University of Athens and currently he is a PhD candidate at the same University in the Department of Sociology (specialization: Modern Greek Society). He joined the E.DI.K. Youth wing in 1989 and he became president of the organisation on the 13/08/1993. He had a close collaboration with Yannis Zighdis and Professor Neoklis Sarris, who were the precedent leaders of the E.DI.K party. Stavros Karampelas was elected as President of the Union of the Democratic Centre by the 3rd Congress (9 March 2012). He had previously been a member of the Executive Committee, the Organising Secretary and the General Secretary of the Party. He has worked as an executive member in the private sector, in the field of Management Communication but also as a contact person of the Dodecanese Cultural Foundation 'Kleovoulos Lindos".

Today is working as columnist and he is member of the Greek Chamber of Commerce. He was among the founders of the National Youth Council (E.SY.N.) and elected president of the same organisation for the years 2001-2003.
