= Chrysos Evelpidis =

Greek agronomist and politician

- Born: 1895
- Died: 29 April 1971
- Occupations: University teacher, agriculturist, jurist, minister

Chrysos Evelpidis (Greek: Χρυσός Ευελπίδης, 1895 – April 29, 1971) was a Greek agronomist, professor, member of the parliament and minister.

== Biography ==
He was born in Istanbul in 1895 and studied at the Greek Chatzichristou High School. He studied agronomy and engineering at the University of Montpellier in France and political science at the University of Athens. He began his career as prefectural agronomist at the Achaea–Elis Prefecture in 1917. From 1924 until 1951, he taught at Agrarian Law and Policy at Panteion University and then Agricultural Economics at the Higher School of Agriculture in Athens. From 1944 until 1945, he was Rector of the Panteion University and then emeritus professor. During the period from 1964 till 1965, he was dean at the Agricultural University of Athens. He was president of the Agricultural Economist Company. He traveled to Asia with Nikos Kazantzakis. He was an elected member of the parliament representing Evros Prefecture with the Liberal Party in 1933 and the EPEK party in 1951. He served as a general secretary (1924-1927) and later as Minister of Agriculture in the Themistoklis Sofoulis government from 22 November 1945 until 29 March 1946. Then he served as Minister of Finance in the Nikolaos Plastiras government from the 27 October 1951 to 11 October 1952, when the government resigned. He dealt with literature, writing under the pseudonym Chr. Esperas. In 1957, he was honored with a state literary prize (second prize for essay) for the essay "Culture and civilization". He also published many articles and studies and wrote books.

From 1935 until 1967, he was publisher of the magazine ‘Rural Economy’. He died on 29 April 1971. His library, donated to the Aristotle University of Thessaloniki by his widow, currently includes 8639 volumes.

== Selected publications ==
- The agricultural program (Το αγροτικό πρόγραμμα)(1923)
- The Balkan states (Τα βαλκανικά κράτη) (1930)
- The agricultural crisis in Greece (Γεωργική κρίσις ιδία εν Ελλάδι)(1931)
- The national income (Το εθνικόν εισόδημα) (1935)
- Theory and practice of agricultural politics and economy (Θεωρία και πράξις αγροτικής πολιτικής και οικονομίας) (1939–42)
- Hellenism in the countryside (Ο ελληνισμός εις την ύπαιθρον) (1943)
- Agricultural policy (Αγροτική πολιτική) (1956)
- Agricultural economics (Γεωργική οικονομική) (1957)
