= Nikolaos Makarezos =

Greek politician and military officer (1919–2009)

- Νικόλαος Μακαρέζος

Deputy Prime Minister of Greece
- In office 26 August 1971 – 28 September 1973 Serving with Stylianos Pattakos
- Prime Minister: Georgios Papadopoulos
- Preceded by: Stylianos Pattakos
- Succeeded by: Stylianos Pattakos

Minister of Coordination of Greece
- In office 21 April 1967 – 25 August 1971
- Prime Minister: Konstantinos Kollias (Apr–Dec 1967); Georgios Papadopoulos (1967–1971)
- Preceded by: Panagiotis Pipinelis
- Succeeded by: Athanasios Kapsalis (as Minister of Coordination and Planning)

Personal details
- Born: 1919 Gravia, Greece
- Died: 3 August 2009 (aged 89–90) Athens, Greece
- Resting place: Papagou Cemetery
- Party: Independent
- Spouse: Harikleia Matthaiou
- Children: 2
- Education: Hellenic Military Academy; Athens University of Economics and Business; Panteion University; University of Piraeus
- Occupation: Military officer; politician; writer
- Civilian awards: Order of Isabella the Catholic (1972)

Military service
- Allegiance: Greece
- Branch/service: Hellenic Army; Artillery
- Years of service: 1937–1967
- Rank: Brigadier
- Battles/wars: World War II; Greco-Italian War; Greek resistance; Dekemvriana; Greek Civil War; 1967 Greek coup d'état
- Military awards: Cross of Valour; War Cross; Medal for Outstanding Acts; Medal of Military Merit
- Criminal information
- Status: Deceased
- Criminal charges: Treason; Mutiny

Nikolaos Makarezos (Greek: Νικόλαος Μακαρέζος; 1919 – 3 August 2009) was an officer of the Hellenic Army who was one of the principal leaders of the 1967 Greek coup d'état, along with Colonel Georgios Papadopoulos, and Brigadier Stylianos Pattakos. Together they overthrew Prime Minister Panagiotis Kanellopoulos and established a military dictatorship that ruled Greece from 1967 until 1973. He served as Deputy Prime Minister (1971–1973) and Minister of Coordination (1967–1971).

== Early life and career ==
Nikolaos Makarezos was born in 1919, in Gravia, in the prefecture of Phocis. After finishing the local school and the gymnasium at Lamia, he entered the Hellenic Military Academy in 1937, graduating in 1940 with the rank of 2nd Lieutenant of Artillery. His first posting was in the 1st Heavy Artillery Regiment. He took part in the Greco-Italian War and the Battle of Greece, following which he served in the armed forces of the Greek government in exile. Following the war, he completed his studies at the Greek Artillery School at Megalo Pefko, where he also served as an instructor in later years. He also completed a course at the US Army's Artillery School at Babenhausen in West Germany, and studied Economics and Political Science. In 1962-1965, he was placed as a military attaché at the Greek embassy in Bonn.

== Junta ==
Along with fellow Colonel Georgios Papadopoulos and Brigadier Stylianos Pattakos, he led the group of mid-ranking officers that overthrew the government of Panagiotis Kanellopoulos in a coup d'état on 21 April 1967 and established a military regime—the "Junta of the Colonels"—that lasted for seven years. Makarezos was a central figure in most of the ensuing dictatorial governments, as Coordination Minister until August 1971 and from then on until October 1973 as Deputy Prime Minister. Among the senior junta leadership, he alone had a knowledge of economics, so he was entrusted with the country's economy. The early years of the regime saw a notable economic boom, with increased development rates, low unemployment and low inflation. This was achieved through extensive foreign investments, the construction of infrastructure projects and considerable investments in the tourism industry. By 1973 however, the rate of development had begun falling, and the widespread corruption and financial scandals, as well as political stagnation, resulted in a drop in the regime's popularity. When Papadopoulos attempted to slowly democratize the regime in 1973, appointing the civilian Spyros Markezinis as Prime Minister, Makarezos was dropped from his government role.

== Later life and death ==
Following the collapse of the junta in July 1974, Makarezos was placed under arrest and sent to the island of Kea. Along with other junta leaders, he was then put on trial for treason and rebellion. Found guilty and sentenced to death, his sentence was later commuted to life imprisonment.

Since 1990, Makarezos was released from jail on medical grounds on successive temporary leaves, but was confined to his house. He claimed to have regrets for many of his actions but continued to boast about his economic achievements during the junta.

He married Harikleia Matthaiou and they had two children, Ekaterini (b. 1945), and Ioannis (b. 1954).

He died in Athens, on 3 August 2009, at age 90. He was buried the next day at Papagou Cemetery.
