= Kyriakos Papachronis =

Greek serial killer

- Born: 1960 (age 65–66); Xanthi, Greece
- Other name: "The Ogre of Drama"
- Conviction: Murder
- Penalty: Life imprisonment

Details
- Victims: 3
- Span of crimes: 1981–1982
- Country: Greece
- Date apprehended: 13 December 1982

Kyriakos Papachronis (Greek: Κυριάκος Παπαχρόνης, born 1960), also known as the "Ogre of Drama" (ο δράκος της Δράμας), is a Greek serial killer. While working as a cadet officer in the army, he killed 3 prostitutes and attempted to rape 5 more in the city of Drama in northern Greece from 1981 to 1982. The surviving victims' testimonies led to his capture on 13 December 1982. He was initially court-martialed and sentenced to two life sentences, but it was later reduced to life imprisonment. In the early days of his imprisonment, he was particularly undisciplined and violent but by the late 1990s, he turned into an exemplary prisoner. 22 years later, in 2004, he was released from prison. Papachronis now lives peacefully in Larissa, undisturbed by authorities.

== Early life ==
Kyriakos Papachronis was born in 1960 in Xanthi to parents Erifili and Charalambos Papachronis. He also had a brother and a sister. The Papachronis family kept a cafeteria in the city where Kyriakos worked since he was little. When he finished high school, he stayed for a while in Athens, making a living from working in various hotels. He dealt with sports and excelled mainly in boxing (in which he was declared champion in the 90 kg class) and karate, in which he was also declared a champion.

== Crimes ==
In the afternoon of 9 September 1981, Papachronis visited a brothel in the area of Profitis Ilias in Xanthi and requested the services of a 46-year-old prostitute. The coup, however, resulted in a fight, with the woman (as claimed by Papachronis) who underestimated his sexual competence. He fled furiously to return a few hours later, stabbing the woman to death. His next victim, also a prostitute, he met on the streets of Drama. On 20 December 1981, while she was looking for customers, Papachronis followed her without her realizing and stabbed the woman in the back, but her screaming attracted passers-by and he quickly fled. Ten days later, on 30 December, after she had left a screening of a porn movie, a 19-year-old student was attacked by Papachronis. He stabbed her in the cervix, but was seen by the girl's father, who was waiting for her, and fled. On 15 January 1982, Papachronis attacked a nurse while walking to the train station in Drama. He dragged her under the airbridge and knocked her out, trying to rape her. But he eventually changed his mind and left the woman alive, who was the first victim to give the police a precise and detailed description of Papachronis. On 15 August 1982, he accidentally met a recent acquaintance at the Archaeological Museum of Thessaloniki, a girl named Anastasia Alexandridou, and persisted for her to go with him. He then followed the girl to her house and asked to make love. Eventually, he closed her mouth, grabbed her and dragged the girl to an adjacent grove. There he pulled out his knife (which he always carried with him) from his sock and stabbed her in the cervix, ripping her clothes off and raped her. He left her there naked, stealing all her personal belongings and throwing them away near the Menemeni train station, keeping only her lighter (which would later link him beyond doubt to the murder of the girl). The victim died two hours later from internal haemorrhage and pulmonary asphyxia. On 21 September 1982, he attacked a 23-year-old, who managed to escape. On 1 October 1982, after observing her, he attacked and seriously injured an 18-year-old girl outside her home in Drama. On 25 October, he attacked in Xanthi, this time seriously injuring a 32-year-old prostitute. His last victim was a 30-year-old mother of four working as a cleaner, whom he stalked for several days before attacking her. On 30 December 1982, he stabbed her in the face and carotid, then vanished.

== Arrest ==
The perpetrator's description by his surviving victims depicted a man wearing a military uniform, limiting the range of suspects. The involvement of military authorities in search of the killer, with the detailed conduct of investigations and monitoring of the movements of suspected soldiers, led to his arrest a few days after his last murder attempt. When the news of the attack was heard, two camp officers, Christos Triandafyllidis and Tasos Kosmidis, looked at the archives that night, and noted that only a few men were out of camp (due to a ban on leaving) and one of them was Kyriakos Papachronis, who had arrived late. He was questioned by the campmaster, and due to the fact that he had no alibi for that particular evening, his apparent nervousness made the officer investigate his apartment. From this search, his knives were discovered, as well as the lighter he had kept as a trophy from Anastasia. He was subsequently arrested on 13 December 1982 by the Drama authorities. Papachronis refused to admit guilt on all charges at first, but the many inaccuracies, his erroneous answers, the heaps of recognitions from his victims, the lack of an alibi, and fatigue from the interrogations eventually led him to confess to everything he had done. He also admitted that on 12 March 1982, he had placed two bombs at the Post Office and the National Bank of Greece's Xanthi Branch, and on the following day, he had placed two more bombs in a shop at the Alpha Bank Branch in Kavala. On 16 June 1982, he placed another bomb at the door of his camp in Drama, and he was also responsible for a small arson at Kavala Airport.

== Trial ==
Papaxonis' trial was held from 14 to 18 June 1983 in the building of the Five-Member Court of Appeal of Thessaloniki, under the jurisdiction of the Standing Military Court of Kavala. The trial, as expected, was largely covered by newspapers and television, with almost all the well-known journalists of the time, to deal with and comment on what was happening every day. The appearance of Papachronis in court, however, caused most of the comments – mainly negative and positive – since it was distinguished by great "theatrinism". He tried to justify his actions by constantly referring to his manhood, his courage, his natural rhyme and good looks, even reaching the point of rejecting the advocacy line of his lawyers, saying that ... "I have not built so many years this body to be destroyed by psychiatrists. His aggression and violent behaviour by telling reporters that he would escape and massacre a lot of people, forced the police to dispose of 300 police officers for his custody in the four days that the trial dealt. Papachronis was accused of manslaughter, attempted homicide, and illegal possession and repeated use of weapons. They reported a total of 40 witnesses as well as four different psychiatrists who had been screened during pre-trial detention. Psychiatrists said that he was mentally and spiritually healthy - the court did not admit to any mitigating effect that his lawyers had advocated (neither the incomprehensibility of the acts, nor the lack of criminal record, nor his young age, nor the eligibility for committing a crime of passion - "boiling of the soul"), and sentenced him "to death", with 20 years imprisonment. Approximately one year later, in July 1984, the Court of Appeal, in the second trial, sentenced him to death for two murders, 27 years imprisonment for seven attempted murders and 8 attempted rapes, 2 years in prison for possession of 9 weapons and 10 years deprivation of political rights.

== Imprisonment ==
His imprisonment began on 13 December 1982, immediately after his arrest and detention in a prison in Corfu. He proved to be a difficult prisoner, being aggressive and angry, with violent behaviour by participating in micro-riots in the prison and hitting his retainers. After his trial, he was briefly held in a military prison in Thessaloniki, where he was also troublesome, and in a fit of rage that lasted for hours, he completely destroyed his cell. In 2000, when he was tried by the Three-Member Court of Appeal of Thessaloniki and the offences he had committed during his imprisonment, he was charged with: "the sentence of life imprisonment and a temporary imprisonment of 23 years and 9 months for intentional and collusive homicide crimes, attempted manslaughter intentionally and by collision, dangerous personal injury, attempted rape, confinement, theft, illegal artillery, continuation of weapons of mass destruction, the theft of objects belonging to the State at a time of continuity, the illegal possession of weapons, the deliberate and violent explosion, the attempted explosion and arson with intent from which it could pose human risk in complicity with common fraudulently".

Over time, accepting the situation, Papachronis began to calm down. In fact, after permanently settling in the Larissa prison, he began to read books on theology and psychology, paint, and spend time in the prison church. Unusual for a Greek serial killer, is the correspondence that Papachronis maintained during his imprisonment. With the profile of a nice and brave army officer, he seduced a certain category of women ("serial killer groupies", as they are called) who sent him love letters promising eternal love. He was released from prison on parole on December 8, 2004, at the age of 44 after 22 years in prison. In his written statement to the press, he wrote:

"Twenty-two years ago, drifting away from age, and especially from my terrible encounters, we all sold our souls to Lucifer - like Faust - and I personally lost, taking an exorbitant legal obedience. I ask the founding state from the public opinion to apologize for "the mean soul" for those abominable burdens of my annoyances and I promise to continue to live "in an obscure and subdued state ..." and of course "brilliant in every way ..."! Hasta la vista, in due course.

== Psychological profile ==
According to Papachronis, the cause of his behaviour was the first time he visited a brothel in his teens. In particular, he argued that at the age of 14, while visiting a brothel in Xanthi, the rejection and embarrassment he experienced from the prostitute when he was unable to perform the sexual act gave birth to his hatred towards women. And the second attempt – again with a prostitute – was the same. This prostitute even mocked him in front of his friends, which was a major blow to his self-esteem. Papachronis was locked in himself, entertained by porn movies, and when he tried a few years later with a prostitute, he failed again. This awakened his memories and hatred of women, causing his avenging fury. Psychiatrists who examined him said that the masochistic need to torment his body in order to reach the limits of his endurance drove him, since for Papachronis the physical rhyme was the only proof of masculinity. The narcissistic structure of his personality, on the other hand, created a host of other features such as intense anxiety, social immaturity, distrust and individualism. His need for sovereignty, and his inability to manage rejection, led him to extreme emotional states.

== In the media ==
In the case of Papachronis, the episode of the television series Anatomy of a Crime, "Deadly Toys: The Lead Soldier", was based on him. Giannis Bezos plays as Papachronis.

== See also ==
- List of serial killers by country
