= Stylianos Pattakos =

Greek politician and military officer (1912–2016)

- Στυλιανός Παττακός
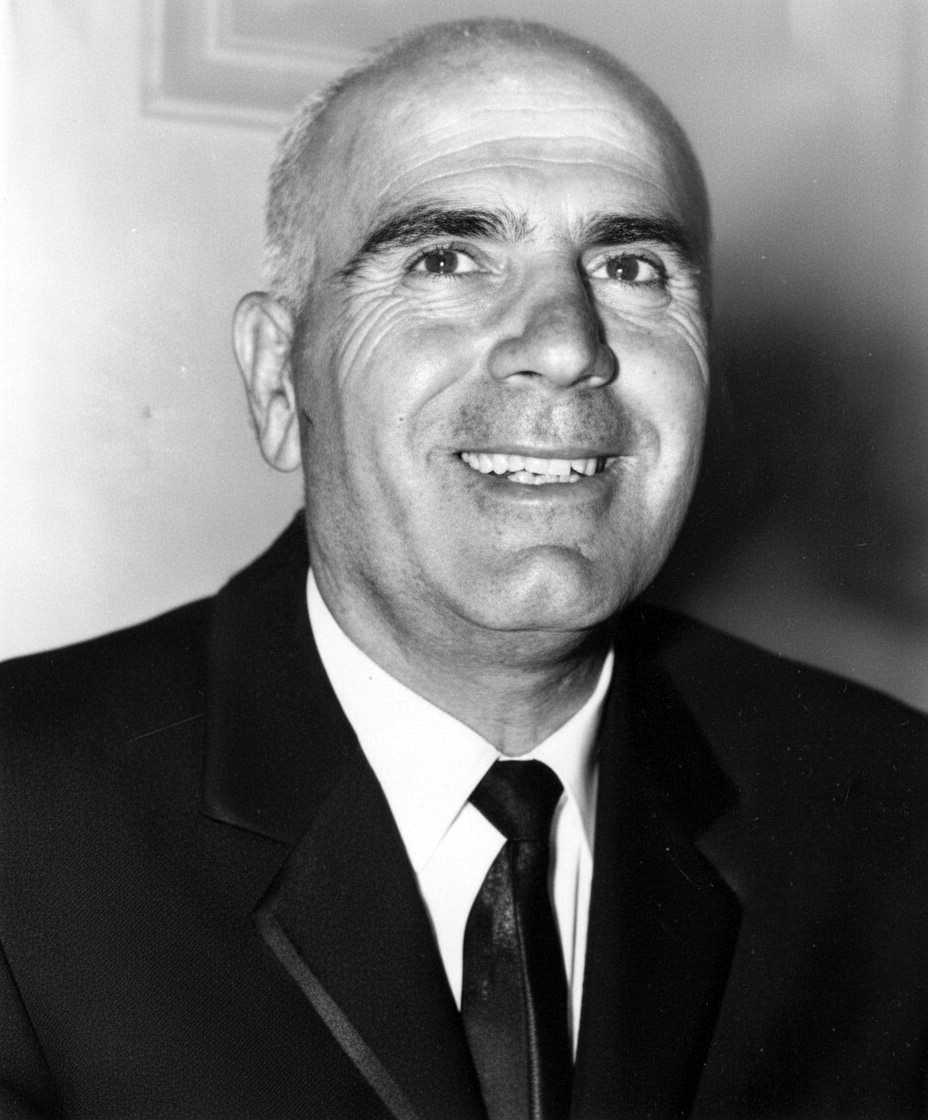
- Pattakos in 1967

Deputy Prime Minister of Greece
- In office 13 December 1967 – 8 October 1973 Serving with: Dimitrios Patilis (1968–1970); Nikolaos Makarezos (1971–1973)
- Prime Minister: Georgios Papadopoulos
- Preceded by: Grigorios Spandidakis
- Succeeded by: Charilaos Mitrelias

Minister of the Interior of Greece
- In office 21 April 1967 – 25 August 1971
- Prime Minister: Konstantinos Kollias (Apr–Dec 1967); Georgios Papadopoulos (1967–1971)
- Preceded by: Spiros Theotokis
- Succeeded by: Adamantios Androutsopoulos
- In office 10 May 1973 – 8 October 1973
- Prime Minister: Georgios Papadopoulos
- Preceded by: Adamantios Androutsopoulos
- Succeeded by: Ioannis Agathangelou

Personal details
- Born: 8 November 1912 Agia Paraskevi, Rethymno, Cretan State
- Died: 8 October 2016 (aged 103) Ano Patisia, Athens, Greece
- Resting place: Agia Paraskevi, Rethymno, Greece
- Citizenship: Cretan State (until 1913); Greece (from 1913)
- Party: Independent
- Spouse: Dimitra Nikolaidou (m. 1940; died 2013)
- Children: 2
- Education: Hellenic Military Academy
- Occupation: Military officer; politician; writer
- Civilian awards: Order of the Redeemer; Order of George I; Order of the Phoenix; Order of the Holy Sepulchre; Order of Central African Merit
- Nickname: "Trowelman"

Military service
- Allegiance: Second Hellenic Republic (1930–1935); Kingdom of Greece (1935–1941, 1944–1967); (Hellenic State (1941–1944)) Hellenic State (1941–1944)
- Branch/service: Hellenic Army; Cavalry; Armoured Fighting Vehicles
- Years of service: 1930–1967
- Rank: Major general
- Unit: Cavalry Division; 2nd Mechanized Infantry Division; 11th Infantry Regiment; 20th Armoured Division
- Commands: Armored Training Center
- Battles/wars: World War II; Greco-Italian War; Greek resistance; Dekemvriana; Greek Civil War; 1967 Greek coup d'état
- Military awards: Cross of Valour (3); War Cross (7); Medal for Outstanding Acts (2); Medal of Military Merit
- Criminal information
- Status: Deceased
- Criminal charges: High treason; Mutiny

Stylianos Pattakos (Greek: Στυλιανός Παττακός; 8 November 1912 – 8 October 2016) was an officer of the Hellenic Army who was one of the principal leaders of the 1967 Greek coup d'état, along with Colonel Georgios Papadopoulos, and Colonel Nikolaos Makarezos. Together they overthrew Prime Minister Panagiotis Kanellopoulos and established a military dictatorship that ruled Greece from 1967 until 1973. He served as Deputy Prime Minister (1967–1973) and Minister of the Interior (1967–1971).

== Biography ==
Stylianos Pattakos was born on 8 November 1912, in Agia Paraskevi, Rethymno. His parents were farmers. He studied at the Hellenic Military Academy and graduated in 1937. He served as a Lieutenant during the Greco-Italian War (1940-1941) and as cavalry captain and cavalry major during the Greek Civil War (1946-1949). He was a deeply religious man.

Pattakos eventually rose to the rank of Brigadier and was assigned to the tank training centre at Goudi in Athens.

He, along with Georgios Papadopoulos and Nikolaos Makarezos, planned and executed the coup on the night of April 20 to April 21, 1967, claiming political anomaly had made them do so. Many leading politicians and journalists were arrested that night and were led to a hotel in Pikermi. Among them were Konstantinos Mitsotakis, Andreas Papandreou, Georgios Rallis, Manolis Glezos. Pattakos was assigned the Ministry of the Interior. He became also the vice president of Kollias government. As head of that post, Pattakos made the decision to strip Greek actress and political activist, Melina Mercouri, of her Greek citizenship and to also confiscate her property. Mercouri retorted "I was born Greek. I will die Greek. Mr. Pattakos was born a fascist. He will die a fascist". On 25 November 1973, Brigadier General Dimitrios Ioannides overthrew Papadopoulos. The following year, the 7-year Junta came to an end in the aftermath of the Turkish invasion of Cyprus.

The newly restored democratic government of Konstantinos Karamanlis put the junta officials on trial with charges of high treason and insurrection against Georgios Papadopoulos and other co-conspirators. Pattakos, along with the other leaders of the 1967 coup, Papadopoulos and Makarezos, were sentenced to death for high treason, following the trial. Shortly after the sentences were pronounced, they were commuted to life imprisonment by the Karamanlis government. Pattakos spent 17 years in prison. He was released from prison on 28 September 1990 by a judicial council, pursuant to article 557 of the Code of Criminal Procedure which provides for the suspension of the sentence for irreversible health damage (Greek: ανήκεστος βλάβη) and was put under house arrest. He was obliged to report to the police office for registration every 15 days. He later stated that he did not regret any of his actions during the dictatorship. In addition, he denied that people were tortured during the dictatorship, except Alekos Panagoulis and Spyros Moustaklis, who "had it coming".

Pattakos was nicknamed "Trowelman" since he frequently appeared at project inaugurations with a trowel in hand. A staunch non-smoker, he had ordered also all the restaurants in Greece to serve fried potatoes.

=== Personal life, death and funeral ===
Pattakos married Dimitra Nikolaidou in 1940 and they had two daughters, Roza (b. 1946) and Rena (b. 1949). Dimitra died of cardiac arrest on 10 February 2013, at age 90. Pattakos was taken to a hospital two days later, due to a health problem he suffered after his wife's death, but he recovered and allowed to return home the same day.

The loss of his wife cost him dearly, to the point he had stopped eating and wanted to end his life. In the last years of his life, his health had been seriously failing to the point he was bedridden, blind, and also broke, while since 2010 he had been using a pacemaker.

Pattakos died of a stroke in his sleep at his home in the Ano Patisia neighbourhood of Athens on 8 October 2016, at age 103. Two days earlier,three unknown persons who had their faces covered, broke down the door of his home, and after immobilizing his home nurse, they stole jewelry, collectible coins, and many of his military medals. However, he didn't notice the incident, because he was sleeping.

His body arrived with a ship in Souda, on 11 October 2016, and was transported to his birthplace, Agia Paraskevi, Rethymno, where he was buried the same day at the Church of Saint Paraskevi. The funeral was attended by Golden Dawn MPs Konstantinos Barbarousis, Christos Pappas, and other members of the party.

Political offices
Preceded by Spyros Theotokis	Minister for the Interior of Greece; 21 April 1967 – 25 August 1971	Succeeded by Adamantios Androutsopoulos
Preceded by Grigorios Spandidakis	Deputy Prime Minister of Greece; 13 December 1967 – 8 October 1973 (from 26 August 1971 along with Nikolaos Makarezos)	Succeeded by Charilaos Mitrelias
Preceded by Adamantios Androutsopoulos	Minister for the Interior of Greece (interim); 10 May – 8 October 1973	Succeeded by Ioannis Agathangelos
