= Union of the Democratic Centre (Greece) =

Political party in Greece

Union of the Democratic Centre Ένωση Δημοκρατικού Κέντρου
- Leader: Stavros Karampelas
- Founder: Georgios Mavros
- Founded: 5 February 1976; 50 years ago 2012; 14 years ago (re-establishment)
- Merger of: Centre Union – New Forces, Democratic Centre Union
- Ideology: Liberalism (Greek); Radicalism; From 2012: Social democracy Until 1998: Venizelism; Radical centrism
- Political position: From 2012: Centre-left; Until 1998: Centre

Website
- edik.gr

The Union of the Democratic Centre (Greek: Ένωση Δημοκρατικού Κέντρου, abbr. ΕΔΗΚ, Enosi Dimokratikou Kentrou, EDIK) is a social liberal political party in Greece.

The party was founded on 5 February 1976, two years after the end of the Greek military junta of 1967–74, asserting itself to be the ideological successor of the pre-1967 Centre Union party. EDIK was the result of the merger of Centre Union – New Forces and the Democratic Centre Union of Ioannis Zidgis. Its party leader at the time was George Mavros, who had earlier led the Center Union – New Forces; however, he joined the Panhellenic Socialist Movement (PASOK) a couple of years later. The party was led by Zidgis in the early 1980s, and has since adopted more social-democratic positions.

As the Greek political spectrum shifted to the left, EDIK became increasingly marginalized, with PASOK replacing it as the country's second major party. The party's support collapsed in the elections of 1981, when it gained 0.7% of the vote and was shut out of Parliament. However, George Mavros was elected as an independent on a PASOK ticket, and again in 1985, when EDIK and PASOK officially co-operated. In 1989, EDIK ran independently and did not elect any representatives in parliament.

From 1998 to 2011, the party president was Neoklis Sarris, and the party operated mostly as a forum of political analysis and public, ideological debates. In the 2009 legislative elections Neoklis Sarris ran for Democratic Revival. In 2012 the Union of the Democratic Centre was reconstructed. Stavros Karabelas was elected new president of the party and shifted the political characteristics of the party to the left. Consequently, in the May 2012 election the party participated as part of the Coalition of the Radical Left (SYRIZA).

The Union of the Democratic Centre was preceded by the Democratic Centre Union (DEK, Greek: Δημοκρατική Ένωση Κέντρου (Δ.Ε.Κ.)), which was founded by Ioannis Zidgis after he was expelled from the Centre Union during the presidency of Georgios Mavros. It participated in the 1974 election and failed to enter the parliament.

== Leaders ==
- George Mavros (1976-1977)
- Ioannis Zidgis (1977-1997)
- Neoklis Sarris (1998-2011)
- Stavros Karabelas (2012-today)

== Elections ==
=== Hellenic Parliament ===
Election	Hellenic Parliament					Rank	Government	Leader
Election	Votes	%	±pp	Seats won	+/−	Rank	Government	Leader
1977^{A}	612,786	11.95%	−8.64%	16 / 300	▲16	3rd	Opposition	Georgios Mavros
1981	22,763	0.40%	–8.07%	0 / 300	▼16	7th	Extra-parliamentary	Ioannis Zigdis
Jun 1989	7,770	0.12%	−0.28%	0 / 300	0	13th	Extra-parliamentary	Ioannis Zigdis

^{A} 1977 results are compared to the Centre Union – New Forces and Democratic Centre Union totals in the 1974 election.

=== European Parliament ===
European Parliament
Election	Votes	%	±pp	Seats won	+/−	Rank	Leader
1981	63,676	1.12%	New	0 / 24	0	8th	Ioannis Zigdis
1984	16,848	0.28%	−0.84%	0 / 24	0	10th	Ioannis Zigdis
1989	18,313	0.28%	−0.00%	0 / 24	0	15th	Ioannis Zigdis
