= Seoul International Eco Film Festival =

Eco film festival in South Korea

- Official poster
- Location: MEGABOX Seongsu 1, 2, Seoul, South Korea
- Predecessor: Seoul Eco Film Festival
- Founded: 2004
- Hosted by: Korea Green Foundation; Seoul Eco Film Festival Organize Committee; Supported by: Ministry of Environment; Seoul Metropolitan Government; Korea Forest Service; Korean Film Council
- No. of films: 57 films from 27 countries
- Festival date: Opening: 2 June 2022; Closing: 8 June 2022
- Language: International
- Website: en.sieff.kr

Current: 19th Seoul International Eco Film Festival
- 20th 18th

Seoul International Eco Film Festival (previously known as Green Film Festival in Seoul) (SIEFF), held in Seoul, South Korea, is the largest international environment film festival in Asia. Established in 2004, it is an annual event held in time with World Environment Day – June 5. The festival is a non-competitive film festival with partial competitions within sections and 111 films from 35 countries will be screened during the festival.

GFFIS of 2014 was held from May 9 to 15, every day from 11:00am to 7:00pm at the Seoul Museum of History, Cinecube and INDIESPACE, Gwanghwamun. The festival has been renamed the 'Seoul Eco Film Festival' since 2018. The new English name features the festival's venue, 'Seoul' and the film festival's personality.

The 18th edition of the film festival was held from June 3 to June 9, 2021, at the Rachel Carson Hall of the Korea Green Foundation with no on-site audience. It was live-streamed via SEFF's YouTube channel. A total of 64 films from 25 countries were screened; the opening film was Who We Were (2021) by Marc Bauder.

With 19th edition of the festival name was again changed to Seoul International Eco Film Festival, and it will be held from June 2 to June 8, 2022. With the expansion of the film festival this year's slogan has been kept as 'Ecoverse'.

== Program of Festival ==
- Green talk - It is a talk program designed to diagnose climate change problems and explore alternatives from a long-term perspective for future generations.
- Cinema Greenteen - This program is designed to teach children and teenagers about the importance of the environment. The program offer opportunities to see, experience, and participate in the Seoul Film Festival. Elementary, middle and high school students from across the country can apply.

== See also ==
- List of festivals in South Korea
- List of festivals in Asia
