= List of Columbia University alumni and attendees =

This is a partial list of notable persons who have or had ties to Columbia University.

== Business ==
- Robert Agostinelli – co-founder of Rhone Group and Friends of Israel Initiative
- His Imperial and Royal Highness Prince Amedeo of Belgium (M.B.A.) – eldest grandson of King Albert II of Belgium; archduke of Austria and prince of Hungary
- John Jacob Astor III – 19th-century real estate baron
- Frank Lusk Babbott (LL.B. 1880) – jute merchant and art patron
- Leonard Blavatnik (M.A.) – Russian-American businessman; founder, chairman and president of Access Industries
- Warren Buffett (M.S. 1951) – investor, president of Berkshire Hathaway
- Ursula Burns (M.S. 1981) – CEO of Xerox Corporation (July 1, 2009–); first African-American woman CEO to head a Fortune 500 company
- William Campbell (B.A., M.A.) – chairman of the board, former CEO, Intuit, Inc.; head football coach, Columbia University, 1974–79
- Bennett Cerf (B.A. 1919, Litt.B. 1920) – founder of Random House
- John B. Chambers (M.A., English literature) – deputy head of the Sovereign Debt Ratings Group; chairman of the Sovereign Debt Committee at Standard and Poor's
- Leon G. Cooperman (M.B.A. 1967) – billionaire chairman and CEO of Omega Advisors; former general partner, Chairman, CEO of Goldman Sachs Asset Management
- Lynn Forester de Rothschild (J.D.) – CEO of E.L. Rothschild (2002–)
- Jason Epstein – editorial director at Random House
- Stephen Friedman – chairman of Goldman Sachs; National Economic Council director; chairman of the President's Foreign Intelligence Advisory Board
- Mario Gabelli – investor
- Carlos Goez (1939–1990) – founder of the original Pomander Book Shop
- Michael Goodkin (M.B.A.) – quantitative finance entrepreneur; instrumental in development of computer program pricing of exotic financial derivatives and structured products
- James P. Gorman (M.B.A. 1987) – CEO of Morgan Stanley
- Noam Gottesman (B.A.) – billionaire, GLG Partners
- Michael Gould (B.A. 1966) – CEO of Bloomingdale's
- Joseph Peter Grace, Sr. (B.A.) – president and CEO of W. R. Grace and Company
- Armand Hammer – president of Occidental Petroleum; internationalist; convicted for illegal campaign donations
- Herman Hollerith (Engineer of Mines 1879, Ph.D. 1890) – founder of the Tabulating Machine Company, a predecessor to IBM
- Ben Horowitz (B.S. 1988) – co-founder of venture capital firm Andreessen Horowitz
- Walter C. Johnsen (M.B.A. 1978) – chairman and CEO of Acme United Corporation
- Philip Johnston – co-founder and CEO of Starcloud, building data centers in space
- Inez Y. Kaiser – first African-American woman to run a public relations company with national clients
- John Kluge – founder of Metromedia
- Alfred A. Knopf (B.A. 1912) – founder of Alfred A. Knopf, Inc. Publishers
- Ömer Koç – chairman of Koç Holding
- Robert Kraft (B.A. 1963) – owner of New England Patriots
- Henry Kravis (M.B.A. 1969) – investment banker who invented the leveraged buyout
- Sallie Krawcheck (M.B.A. 1992) – former chairman, CEO of Sanford Bernstein; number seven on Forbes' 2005 list of The World's 100 Most Powerful Women
- Jonathan Lavine (B.A. 1988) – co-managing partner of Bain Capital and chief investment officer of Bain Capital Credit
- Randolph Lerner (1984) – CEO of MBNA Bank; owner of Cleveland Browns
- Dan Loeb (B.A.) – billionaire, founder of Third Point LLC
- Frank Lorenzo (B.A. 1961) – corporate raider
- Benedict I. Lubell (B.A., J.D.) – oil industry executive
- John R. MacArthur (B.A. 1917) – president and publisher of Harper's, the oldest continuously published monthly magazine in the country
- Frank J. Manheim (1934) – partner, Lehman Brothers; influential in the global success of Hertz Corp.; director of 20 US corporations; author
- Lynn Martin (M.A.) – banker and computer programmer, 68th president of the New York Stock Exchange
- James Melcher (born 1939) – Olympic fencer and hedge fund manager
- Norman B. Norman (B.A. 1934) – advertising executive who co-founded Norman, Craig & Kummel
- Eric Ober – former president of CBS News division, and Food Network
- Timothy L. O'Brien (M.B.A., 1992) – edits and oversees the Sunday Business section of The New York Times
- Vikram Pandit (B.S. 1976, M.S. 1977, M.B.A. 1980, Ph.D. 1986, trustee) – CEO of Citigroup
- Mark J. Penn (Law) – worldwide CEO, public relations firm Burson-Marsteller; president of polling firm Penn, Schoen and Berland Associates
- Azita Raji (M.B.A. 1991) – investment banker, philanthropist, nominated as ambassador to Sweden in 2014
- Isaac Rice (1880) – founder of the Electric Boat Company and other businesses, U.S. chess patron
- Wayne Allyn Root (B.A. 1983) – founder and chairman of Winning Edge International, inducted into Las Vegas Walk of Stars in 2006
- David Sainsbury, Baron Sainsbury of Turville (M.B.A.) – chairman, CEO, J Sainsbury plc (1992–1997); deputy chairman (1988–1992)
- Miguel Salis (M.B.A. 1984) – green entrepreneur
- Edwin Schlossberg (B.A. 1967, Ph.D. 1971) – founder and principal designer of ESI Design
- David O. Selznick – movie producer
- Robert Shaye (J.D. 1964) – CEO of New Line Cinema
- Lawrence L. Shenfield (B.A. 1915) – advertising executive, philatelist
- Shin Dong-bin (M.B.A. 1980) – chairman, Lotte Group (2011–)
- Richard L. Simon (1920) – co-founder of Simon & Schuster
- Robert F. Smith (M.B.A. 1994) – billionaire investor; founder, chairman, and CEO of Vista Equity Partners; ranked by Forbes in 2015 as 268th richest man in America, and the second wealthiest African-American
- Gus Stavros – founder of the Stavros Institute and the Pinellas Education Foundation
- Jon Steinberg (M.B.A.) – president and COO, BuzzFeed
- Joseph M. Tucci (M.S.) – chairman, president, and CEO of EMC Corporation (2006–); former chairman and CEO of Wang Laboratories
- P. Roy Vagelos (M.D. 1954) – chairman and CEO of Merck & Co.
- Alan Wagner (B.A. 1951, M.A. 1952) – first president of Disney Channel; East Coast vice president of programming at CBS; radio personality; opera historian and critic
- S. Robson Walton (J.D. 1969) – chairman of the Board, Wal-Mart
- Robert K. Watson (M.B.A. 2007) – market transformation expert and founder of the LEED Green Building Rating System of U.S. Green Building Council
- Shelby White – investor, art collector, and philanthropist
- Andrew Yang (J.D.) – entrepreneur, founder of Venture for America, and 2020 US presidential candidate

== Religion and ministry ==
See also: Notable alumni of Columbia College of Columbia University (religious figures) for separate listing of more than 10 religious figures.

- Anthony Joseph Bevilacqua (M.A. 1962) – cardinal of the Roman Catholic Church (1991–12); archbishop of Philadelphia (1988–03); bishop of Pittsburgh (1983–88)
- George BonDurant – founder of Point University (1937) and Mid-Atlantic Christian University (1948)
- Sharon Brous (B.A., M.A.) – rabbi and essayist, founder of IKAR
- Reuben Clark (J.D.) – prominent leader in the Church of Jesus Christ of Latter-day Saints
- Carl Henry Clerk (1926) – fourth synod clerk of the Presbyterian Church of the Gold Coast
- Jack Cohen (Ph.D.) – Reconstructionist rabbi, educator, philosopher and author
- Elliot N. Dorff (Ph.D. 1971) – conservative rabbi
- Ira Eisenstein (B.A., Ph.D.) – rabbi; co-founder of Reconstructionist Judaism, along with Rabbi Mordecai Kaplan
- David Ellenson (Ph.D.) – rabbi and eighth president of Hebrew Union College-Jewish Institute of Religion
- John Patrick Foley (M.A.) – cardinal of the Roman Catholic Church (2007–2011); resident of Pontifical Council for Social Communications (1984–2007)
- Samuel H. Goldenson (M.A., Ph.D.) – Polish-born rabbi
- Herbert S. Goldstein (B.A., M.A.) – prominent rabbi and Jewish leader
- Benedict Groeschel (Ph.D. 1971) – Catholic priest, author, psychologist; co-founder of Franciscan Friars of the Renewal
- Leon Harrison (B.A.) – rabbi
- Joseph Herman Hertz (Ph.D.) – Jewish Hungarian-born rabbi and Bible scholar; chief rabbi of the United Kingdom (1913–1946) during World War I and World War II
- Arthur Hertzberg (Ph.D. 1966) – Conservative rabbi; prominent Jewish-American scholar and activist
- Mordecai Kaplan (M.A., Ph.D.) – rabbi; co-founder of Reconstructionist Judaism, along with Rabbi Ira Eisenstein
- Charles E. H. Kauvar (M.A. 1901) – rabbi
- Israel Knox – philosophy professor
- Irwin Kula (born 1957) – rabbi and author
- Yehuda Kurtzer (born 1977) – intellectual
- Archbishop Leontios of Cyprus – archbishop of Cyprus (1947)
- Joseph Lookstein – rabbi and president of Bar-Ilan University
- Alexander Lyons (M.A. 1906) – rabbi
- James Francis Aloysius McIntyre – American cardinal of the Roman Catholic Church (1953–1979); archbishop of Los Angeles (1948–1970)
- Thomas Merton (B.A. 1938, studied for M.A.) – 20th-century Catholic writer; student of comparative religions; Trappist monk; poet; author of The Seven Storey Mountain
- In Jin Moon (B.A.) – president of Unification Church of the United States (2009–)
- Frederick Buckley Newell (M.A. 1916) – bishop, Methodist Church
- Samuel Provoost (B.A. 1758) – first chaplain of the United States Senate; first bishop of the Episcopal Diocese of New York
- Emanuel Rackman (B.A. 1931, LL.B. 1933, Ph.D. 1953) – Modern Orthodox rabbi; president of Bar-Ilan University
- Paula Reimers (M.A. 1971) – rabbi
- Henry Y. Satterlee (B.A. 1863) – first Episcopal bishop of Washington (1896–1908); established Washington National Cathedral
- Michael Schudrich (M.A. 1982) – chief rabbi of Poland
- Mendel Shapiro (J.D.) – Jerusalem lawyer and Modern Orthodox rabbi; author of a notable halakhic analysis
- Jaime Soto (M.S.W. 1986) – Roman Catholic bishop of the Roman Catholic Diocese of Sacramento
- Milton Steinberg (Ph.D. 1928) – rabbi and novelist
- Diosdado Talamayan (M.A. 1970) – archbishop, Roman Catholic Archdiocese of Tuguegarao (1986–) in the province of Cagayan on the island of Luzon, Philippines
- George W. Webber – president of New York Theological Seminary
- Hazen Graff Werner – bishop, the Methodist Church
- Jan Willis (Ph.D.) – African-American Buddhist and Buddhist scholar at Wesleyan University; called influential by Time magazine, Newsweek (cover story), and Ebony Magazine

== Architecture, arts and literature ==
See also: Notable alumni of Columbia Graduate School of Architecture, Planning and Preservation, Columbia College of Columbia University (artists and architects; and writers) and Columbia Law School (arts and Letters) for separate listing of more than 90 architects, artists, and writers.

- Max Abramovitz (1931) – 1961 Rome Prize; designed Avery Fisher Hall at Lincoln Center, the United Nations complex, and the Assembly Hall
- Aravind Adiga (B.A. 1997) – author of The White Tiger and winner of the 2008 Man Booker Prize
- Mitch Albom (M.A., M.B.A.) – author, journalist, screenwriter, dramatist, Tuesdays with Morrie, The Five People You Meet in Heaven, For One More Day
- Chester Holmes Aldrich (Ph.B. 1893) – architect and director of the American Academy in Rome from 1935 until his death in 1940
- Jacob M. Appel (M.A., M.Phil.) – author (Creve Coeur) and playwright (Arborophilia, The Mistress of Wholesome)
- Sara Kathryn Arledge – artist
- Irene Aronson (B.A. 1960, M.A. 1962) – painter and printmaker
- John Ashbery (M.A. 1951) – poet; MacArthur Fellowship, National Book Award, National Book Critics Circle Award, Pulitzer Prize for Poetry
- Isaac Asimov (B.S. 1939, Ph.D. 1948) – science fiction author, The Foundation series, I, Robot; Nebula Awards, Hugo Awards; 1984 Humanist of the Year
- Paul Auster (B.A. 1969) – postmodern author, The New York Trilogy, Moon Palace (named after now-defunct Chinese restaurant near campus)
- Carole B. Balin (M.Phil. 1994; Ph.D. 1998) – professor of Jewish history, author, Reform rabbi
- Béla Bartók – musician, composer, pianist, and early scholar in ethnomusicology
- Josh Bazell (M.D.) – novelist
- Clare Beams (M.F.A, 2006) – novelist and short story writer
- James Blish – science fiction author; Nebula Award, Hugo Award; Science Fiction and Fantasy Hall of Fame (2002)
- Helaine Blumenfeld (Ph.D. 1963) – sculptor working in Britain and Italy
- Carlos Brillembourg (M.A. 1975) – architect
- Mary Griggs Burke – largest private collector of Japanese art outside Japan
- Elizabeth Cadbury-Brown – architect
- Duncan Candler (1895) – architect
- Jim Carroll – writer (The Basketball Diaries), poet, punk rocker
- Lesley Chang – architect
- Jerome Charyn (B.A. 1959) – novelist
- Caitlin Cherry (M.F.A. 2012) – painter
- Jonas Coersmeier – award-winning architect and designer; finalist and first runner-up in the World Trade Center Memorial Competition
- Nancy Cohen (M.F.A. 1984) – sculptor, papermaker and installation artist
- Teju Cole (M.Phil.) – novelist, author of Open City
- Robin Cook (M.D.) – physician and novelist; novels combine medical writing with thriller genre; his books have sold nearly 100 million copies
- John Corigliano (B.A. 1959) – musician, composer
- Rita Cox – librarian, storyteller
- E. Wayne Craven (Ph.D. 1963) – art historian and educator
- Agnes Denes – conceptual and environmental artist; Rome Prize, works held in over 40 public museums, including the MoMA, Met and Whitney
- Kiran Desai (M.F.A. 1999) – novelist, winner of 2006 National Book Critics Circle Award for Fiction and the Man Booker Prize, 1998 Betty Trask Award
- E. L. Doctorow (graduate study) – author, National Humanities Medal; thrice winner, National Book Critics Circle Award; Ragtime, Billy Bathgate
- Adee Dodge (M.A. 1935) – painter, Navajo code-talker, linguist
- Timothy Donnelly (M.F.A.) – poet, 2012 Kingsley Tufts Poetry Award; professor at Columbia University
- Alden B. Dow (B.A. 1931) – architect; known for his prolific architectural design
- Pamela Druckerman (M.A.) – author and freelance journalist living in Paris, France
- Louis Dudek (Ph.D.) – Canadian poet, academic and publisher
- Albert Elsen (B.A. 1949, M.A. 1951, Ph.D. 1955) – art historian and educator
- Harold Perry Erskine – sculptor and architect
- Clifford Percy Evans (B.A.) – architect based in Salt Lake City
- Walter Farley (B.A. 1941) – author, The Black Stallion
- Lawrence Ferlinghetti (M.A. 1947) – Beat Generation poet, founder of City Lights Bookstore
- Amanda Filipacchi (M.F.A) – author, Nude Men, Vapor, Love Creeps
- Amanda Foreman – 1998 Whitbread Prize for Best Biography; author, one of The New York Times "Ten Best Books of 2011"
- Allen Forte (B.A.) – music theorist; Battell Professor of Music, emeritus at Yale University
- Hal Foster (M.A. 1979) – art critic and historian; faculty at Princeton since 1997; Berlin Prize
- Nicholas Gage (M.A. 1964) – author, Eleni, A Place For Us, Greek Fire
- Paul Gallico (1919) – author, The Snow Goose, The Poseidon Adventure, The Silent Miaow
- Federico García Lorca (1929–1930) – poet and playwright
- Allen Ginsberg (B.A. 1948) – Beat Generation poet; National Book Award for Poetry for The Fall of America: Poems of These States
- Louise Glück – United States Poet Laureate (2003–2004), Pulitzer Prize, National Book Critics Circle Award, Bobbitt National Prize for Poetry, Bollingen Prize, William Carlos Williams Award, Nobel laureate
- Sean Go (M.S.R.E.D 2021) – Filipino pop artist
- Philip Gourevitch (M.F.A. 1992) – recipient of the National Book Critics Circle Award, editor of The Paris Review
- Edwin Granberry (1920) – writer of the Buz Sawyer comic strip
- Bette Greene (B.A.) – 1975 Newbery Honor, 1973 Golden Kite Award, New York Times Outstanding Book Award, ALA Notable Book Award
- Ismail Gulgee (engineering) – Pakistani artist noted for his paintings and Islamic calligraphy; qualified engineer
- Amanda Harberg – composer, 1992 Fulbright-Hays Fellowship
- Elizabeth Hardwick (attended) – writer; co-founder of The New York Review of Books
- Anthony Hecht (M.A.) – Pulitzer Prize–winning poet, United States Poet Laureate (1982–1984), 1983 Bollingen Prize, 1988 Ruth Lilly Poetry Prize, 1997 Wallace Stevens Award, 1999/2000 Frost Medal
- Joseph Heller (M.A. 1949) – author, Catch-22
- Henry Beaumont Herts (attended) – architect, known for theater designs
- Daniel Hoffman (B.A. 1947, M.A. 1949, Ph.D. 1956) – poet, essayist, United States Poet Laureate (1973–1974)
- John Hollander (B.A.) – poet, MacArthur Fellowship "genius grant", Bollingen Prize (1983)
- Henry Hornbostel (B.A. 1891) – architect; designed more than 225 buildings, bridges, and monuments in the United States
- Langston Hughes – writer and poet
- Zora Neale Hurston (B.A. Barnard; graduate study, two years, CU) – author, folklorist, anthropologist
- Ray William Johnson (B.A.) – YouTuber, producer, and actor
- Ely Jacques Kahn – commercial architect; designed numerous skyscrapers in New York City in the twentieth century
- Rockwell Kent (B.A.) – painter, printmaker, illustrator, and writer
- Maude Kerns (M.A. 1906) – pioneering abstract artist from Portland, Oregon, prolific on the East coast
- Jack Kerouac (College 1940–1942; dropped out) – founder of the Beat Generation movement; author, On the Road
- Keorapetse Kgositsile (M.F.A. 1971) – South African poet and political activist; South African National Poet Laureate in 2006
- Diana Kleiner (M.A. 1970, M.Phil. 1974, Ph.D. 1977) – art historian
- E.J. Koh (M.F.A.) – author, poet, translator
- Benjamin Kunkel (M.F.A.) – novelist, founder of n+1
- Kuntowijoyo (Ph.D. 1980) – author; 1999 S.E.A. Write Award
- David Kvitko – scholar who analysed the philosophy of Leo Tolstoy
- Mpule Kwelagobe (B.A. 2006) – Miss Universe 1999
- Leroy Lamis (M.A.) – sculptor and digital artist known for his Plexiglas sculptures
- Ursula K. Le Guin (M.A. 1951) – author of science fiction, fantasy novels; 1973 National Book Award for Young People's Literature; five Hugo Awards, six Nebula awards
- Tom Lecky (B.A. 1990) – antiquarian bookseller, musician, artist
- David Lehman (B.A. 1970, Ph.D 1978) – poet, author, editor
- Alan Lomax (graduate study) – ethnomusicologist, 1986 National Medal of Arts; 2000 Library of Congress Living Legend Award; National Book Critics Circle Award
- Richard Lowitt (M.A., Ph.D.) – historian, Guggenheim Fellow
- Diego Luzuriaga (Ph.D. 1996) – Ecuadorian composer; 1993 Guggenheim Fellowship Guggenheim Fellowship for Music Composition recipient, composer of first Ecuadorian opera, 2006 recipient of the Eugenio Espejo National Prize.
- Edward MacDowell – composer, professor of music
- Sky Macklay (DMA 2018) – composer, oboist, professor at Valparaiso University
- William March – author; highly decorated U.S. Marine; Company K, The Bad Seed
- John Matteson (Ph.D. 1999) – Pulitzer Prize–winning biographer (2008)
- Patricia McCormick (M.S. 1985) – author for young adults; 2012 National Book Award (Young People's Literature), finalist
- Carson McCullers – author, The Heart Is a Lonely Hunter
- Terrence McNally – playwright; winner of four Tony Awards, an Emmy Award, a Rockefeller Grant, the Lucille Lortel Award, the Hull-Warriner Award
- Barbara Stoler Miller (M.A. 1964) – scholar of Sanskrit literature
- Kate Millett (Ph.D. 1970) – author of Sexual Politics, feminist and artist
- Dorothy Miner (attended) – art historian and curator
- Fereydoun Motamed (M.A. 1952) – linguist, Louis de Broglie award winner from the French Academy (1963)
- Isamu Noguchi – sculptor
- Georgia O'Keeffe (attended TC 1914–15, studied with Arthur Wesley Dow, TC 1916) – artist; Presidential Medal of Freedom, National Medal of Arts
- Sharon Olds (Ph.D.) – National Book Critics Circle Award; T. S. Eliot Prize; Lamont Poetry Prize; Poet Laureate, State of New York (1998–2000)
- Ron Padgett (B.A.) – poet; 2009 Shelley Memorial Award; member New York School
- Francis L. Pell (Ph.B. 1895) – architect
- Evelyn Pope (M.L.S.) – librarian
- John Russell Pope (B.S. Arch 1894) – Rome Prize; designed the National Archives, the Jefferson Memorial in Washington, D.C., the West Building of the National Gallery of Art
- James Otis Post (B.Arch 1895) – architect
- William Stone Post (Ph.B. 1890) – architect
- Joya Powell (B.A. Latin American Studies and Creative Writing 2001) – Bessie Award winning choreographer and professor
- Antoine Predock (B. Arch.) – architect, Rome Prize (1985); AIA Gold Medal (2006), National Design Award (2007)
- Richard Price (M.F.A.) – novelist and screenwriter
- Gregory Rabassa (Ph.D.) – literary translator from Spanish and Portuguese to English; 2006 National Medal of Arts; inaugural U.S. National Book Award (Translation category)
- David Rakoff (B.A. 1986) – Canadian-born writer based in New York City; 2011 Thurber Prize for American Humor
- Claudia Rankine (M.F.A. 1993) – poet; winner of the Jackson Poetry Prize; professor at Pomona College
- James Renwick Jr. (B.A. 1836, M.A. 1839) – Gothic Revival architect; designed St. Patrick's Cathedral, New York and the Smithsonian Institution Building in Washington, D.C.
- Christopher Ross – sculptor, designer and collector
- Mark Rudman (M.F.A.) – poet; National Book Critics Circle Award in poetry
- Karen Russell (M.F.A. 2006) – author, National Book Foundation "5 Under 35" young writer honoree
- Friedrich St. Florian (M. Arch. 1961) – Austrian-American architect; Rome Prize; National World War II Memorial, Washington, D.C.
- J. D. Salinger – author, The Catcher in the Rye
- Anna Pendleton Schenck – architect
- Karenna Gore Schiff (J.D. 2000) – author, journalist, and attorney
- David Serero (M.S.) – French architect; Rome Prize
- Vijay Seshadri (M.F.A. 1988) – winner of the 2014 Pulitzer Prize for Poetry
- Robert Silverberg (B.A. 1956) – science fiction author; five Nebula Awards, four Hugo Awards, the prestigious Prix Apollo; 1999 inductee into Science Fiction Hall of Fame
- Mona Simpson (M.F.A.) – novelist, essayist
- Upton Sinclair – populist and Pulitzer Prize–winning author, The Jungle; presidential candidate
- Tracy K. Smith (M.F.A. 1997) – United States Poet Laureate (2017–2019)
- William Jay Smith – United States Poet Laureate (1968–1970); Rhodes Scholar
- Laurinda Hope Spear (M.S. 1975) – architect and landscape architect; Rome Prize; one of the founders of Arquitectonica
- Ima Winchell Stacy – educator
- Rachel Stern (M.F.A. 2016) – photographer and educator
- Robert A. M. Stern (B.A. 1960) – postmodern architect; dean of the Yale University School of Architecture
- William Lee Stoddart – architect of U.S. East Coast hotels
- Mary Stolz (1936–38) – writer of fiction for children and young adults; Newbery Honors (1962, 1966); 1953 Child Study Children's Book Award
- Hunter S. Thompson – author, Fear and Loathing in Las Vegas; creator of gonzo journalism
- Melvin B. Tolson (M.A.) – Liberian Poet Laureate; central character (played by Denzel Washington) in the movie The Great Debaters (2007)
- Wells Tower (M.F.A.) – writer of fiction and non-fiction, two Pushcart Prizes
- Erica Simone Turnipseed (M.A.) – writer
- Charles Van Doren (M.A., Ph.D. 1955) – author, English professor whose national disgrace was the subject of the Oscar-nominated film Quiz Show
- Mark Van Doren (Ph.D. 1920) – Pulitzer Prize–winning poet
- Eric Van Lustbader (B.A.) – author of thriller and fantasy novels; The Ninja; continuation of the Bourne series by Robert Ludlum
- Eudora Welty (Business, 1930–31, hon. LHD 1982) – Pulitzer Prize–winning author, The Optimist's Daughter
- Frank B. Wilderson III (M.F.A.) – writer, dramatist, filmmaker, and critic
- Blanche Colton Williams (M.A., Ph.D.) – author, editor, department head and professor of literature, and pioneer in women's higher education; first editor of the O. Henry Prize Stories, serving in that position from 1919 to 1932
- Fred F. Willson (B.A. 1902) – architect, Bozeman, Montana; designed many buildings that are listed on the National Register of Historic Places
- James Perry Wilson (B.A. 1914) – architect and painter; designed diorama backgrounds for the American Museum of Natural History, Yale Peabody Museum of Natural History, and Boston Museum of Science
- Dick Wimmer (M.A. 1974) – novelist
- Hana Wirth-Nesher (M.A., M.Phil., Ph.D. 1977) – literary scholar and professor of American and English Studies at Tel Aviv University
- Herman Wouk (B.A. 1934) – Pulitzer Prize–winning author, War and Remembrance
- George Wyatt (B.A. 1971) – sculptor
- Mako Yoshikawa (B.A. 1988) – author, One Hundred and One Ways (1999), a national bestseller translated into six languages
- Charles Yu (J.D. 2001) – author, Interior Chinatown
- Roger Zelazny (M.A. 1962) – science fiction author; The Chronicles of Amber series; three Nebula Awards, six Hugo Awards

== Performing arts ==
See also: Notable alumni of Columbia College of Columbia University (actors; musicians, composers, lyricists; playwrights, screenwriters, and directors) and Columbia University School of the Arts.

=== Academy awards ===
- Casey Affleck (B.A. 1998) – Academy Award-winning actor, Manchester by the Sea
- Raney Aronson-Rath (JRN '95) – Academy Award-winning producer, 20 Days in Mariupol
- Kathryn Bigelow (M.F.A. 1979) – two Academy Awards: director, producer, The Hurt Locker; Time 100; first woman to win Academy Award for directing (2009)
- Sidney Buchman (B.A. 1923) – screenwriter, won an Academy Award for writing Mr. Smith Goes To Washington
- Elinor Burkett (M.A. 1988) – Academy Award-winning producer of Music by Prudence
- James Cagney (upon the death of his father, dropped out) – two Academy Awards: Best Actor, White Heat and Yankee Doodle Dandy; Presidential Medal of Freedom
- Bill Condon (B.A. 1976) – Academy Award-winning writer, Gods and Monsters, Chicago; director, Kinsey and Dreamgirls
- John Corigliano (B.A. 1959) – Academy Award; composer of classical music; 2001 Pulitzer Prize for Music; 2009 Grammy Award
- Adam Davidson (M.F.A. 1991) – Academy Award-winning director for Best Short Subject, The Lunch Date
- I.A.L. Diamond (B.A. 1941) – Academy Award-winning screenwriter for The Apartment
- Tan Dun (Ph.D.) – Academy Award-winning Chinese contemporary classical music composer; scores for Crouching Tiger, Hidden Dragon and Hero
- Peter Farrelly (M.F.A. 1986) – Academy Award-winning director and screenwriter of Green Book
- Miloš Forman (Hon, 2015) – Academy Award-winning director of One Flew Over the Cuckoo's Nest and Amadeus
- Dede Gardner – Academy Award-winning co-producer of 12 Years A Slave
- William Goldman (M.A. 1956) – two-time Academy Award-winning screenwriter; novelist, playwright
- Oscar Hammerstein II (B.A. 1916, studied at Law School 1916–17) – lyricist and librettist; winner of two Academy Awards, two Tony Awards, two Pulitzer Prizes, and two Grammy Awards, including musicals such as the Pulitzer–winning Oklahoma!, The King and I and The Sound of Music; collaborator with Richard Rodgers
- Howard Koch (LL.B.) – Academy Award-winning screenwriter of Casablanca
- Jennifer Lee (M.F.A.) – Academy Award-winning co-screenwriter and co-director of Frozen
- William Ludwig (B.A. 1932) – screenwriter; co-winner, Academy Award for Interrupted Melody (1955); founder of Screen Writers Guild (known now as Writers Guild of America)
- Sidney Lumet (undergraduate studies interrupted by service during World War II) – Academy Award-winning film director (nominated five times)
- Herman J. Mankiewicz (B.A. 1917) – won an Academy Award for co-writing Citizen Kane; older brother of Joseph L. Mankiewicz
- Joseph L. Mankiewicz (B.A. 1928) – won four Academy Awards, including Academy Award for Best Director; younger brother of Herman J. Mankiewicz
- Graham Moore (B.A. 2003) – won an Academy Award for writing The Imitation Game
- Edmond O'Brien (B.A.) – Academy Award-winning actor, The Barefoot Contessa
- Anna Paquin (on leave of absence, attended first year) – Academy Award-winning actress, The Piano and X-Men
- Richard Rodgers (1923) – composer of musicals; winner of one Academy Award, 11 Tony Awards, two Pulitzer Prizes, two Emmy Awards and two Grammy Awards; one of two persons to win an EGOT and a Pulitzer, including the Pulitzer Prize–winning Oklahoma!, The King and I, and The Sound of Music; collaborator with Oscar Hammerstein II
- Franklin Schaffner (studied law, education, interrupted by service during World War II) – Academy Award-winning film director
- Thelma Schoonmaker (studied for M.A.) – three-time Academy Award-winning editor for Raging Bull, The Aviator, and The Departed
- Joshua Seftel (NAJP 2003) – Academy Award-winning producer and director for Best Documentary Short, All the Empty Rooms
- David O. Selznick (G.S. 1923) – three-time Academy Award-winning producer of Gone with the Wind
- Karl Struss (B.A. 1912) – Academy Award-winning cinematographer of Sunrise: A Song of Two Humans
- Steve Tesich (M.A. 1967) – Academy Award-winning screenwriter of Breaking Away
- Allie Wrubel (graduate study in music) – composer, musician, and songwriter, Academy Award ("Zip-A-Dee-Doo-Dah"); Songwriters Hall of Fame

=== Actors, directors, writers, composers, others ===
- Saheem Ali (M.F.A. 2007) – director, associate artistic director at The Public Theater
- Robert Arthur Jr. – writer; met his future radio writing partner David Kogan here in 1940, when both attended class taught by Erik Barnouw
- Emanuel Ax (B.A. 1970) – pianist, won Avery Fisher prize at age 30, won three Grammy Awards along with cellist Yo-Yo Ma; awarded John Jay Award by the University
- Babydaddy, born Scott Hoffman (B.A.) – member of the glam rock band Scissor Sisters
- Ramin Bahrani (B.A. 1996) – director and writer Man Push Cart, Chop Suey, and Goodbye Solo
- Chris Baio – musician, member of indie band Vampire Weekend
- Mason Bates (B.A.) – composer of symphonic music; Chicago Symphony's Mead composer in residence (2010–12)
- Rostam Batmanglij – musician, member of indie band Vampire Weekend
- Kelly Killoren Bensimon (B.A. 1998) – author; former model; former editor of Elle Accessories; cast member of The Real Housewives of New York City
- Albert Berger (M.F.A. 1983) – Academy Award-nominated producer of Cold Mountain, Little Miss Sunshine
- Jeremy Blackman (B.A. 2009) – actor, Magnolia
- John Bohlinger (B.A. 1988) – musician, songwriter, writer, television band leader
- Sorrell Booke (B.A. 1949) – actor, best known as "Boss Hogg" on the TV series The Dukes of Hazzard
- Pat Boone (B.S. 1957) – singer and actor
- Jesse Bradford (B.A. 2002) – actor
- Joshua Brand (M.A. 1974) – Emmy Award-winning creator of St. Elsewhere, I'll Fly Away, and Northern Exposure
- David Brown (M.A. 1937) – Academy Award-nominated film producer, Jaws, The Sting, Cocoon, Driving Miss Daisy
- Cara Buono (B.A. 1993) – actress, Third Watch
- Wendy Carlos (M.A. 1966) – composer and synthesizer pioneer
- Vanessa Carlton – singer, songwriter
- Soman Chainani – author of The School for Good and Evil
- Timothée Chalamet (attended first year) – Academy Award-nominated actor of Call Me By Your Name
- Lisa Cholodenko (M.F.A. 1998) – screenwriter and film director, Laurel Canyon, The L Word
- Peter Cincotti – pianist, singer, songwriter, actor, model
- Spencer Treat Clark (B.A. 2010) – actor, Gladiator, Mystic River, and Unbreakable
- Ben Cooper – actor of film and television
- Federico A. Cordero (M.A., economics) – guitarist of classical music
- Pamela Council (M.F.A. 2004) – artist
- Joseph Cross – actor, Milk
- Ossie Davis (GS 1948) – Golden Globe-nominated actor and activist, Do the Right Thing
- Alice T. Days (M.A.) – documentary filmmaker
- Brian De Palma (B.A. 1962) – movie director, Carrie, Scarface, Carlito's Way The Untouchables
- Brian Dennehy (B.A. 1960) – actor, First Blood, Tommy Boy, Romeo + Juliet, Ratatouille
- R. Luke DuBois (B.A. 1997, M.A. 1999, D.M.A. 2003) – musician, composer/artist, member of the Freight Elevator Quartet
- Todd Duncan (M.A.) – baritone opera singer and actor
- Fred Ebb (M.A. 1957) – lyricist who collaborated with John Kander on such Broadway musicals as Cabaret, Chicago, Woman of the Year and Kiss of the Spider Woman and the soundtracks of Funny Lady and New York, New York
- Jason Everman (B.A. 2013) – guitarist; former member of Nirvana and Soundgarden; Army Ranger; Green Beret
- Peter Farrelly (M.F.A. 1986) – filmmaker, with his brother Bobby Farrelly, There's Something About Mary, Dumb and Dumber
- William Finley (B.A. 1963) – actor
- Matthew Fox (B.A. 1989) – Golden Globe-nominated actor, Lost, Party of Five
- James Franco (M.F.A.) – actor, Golden Globe Award; James Dean; Spider-Man trilogy; Pineapple Express, Milk
- Dan Futterman (B.A. 1989) – actor, The Birdcage, Judging Amy
- Zach Galligan (B.A. 1986) – actor, Gremlins, Gremlins 2
- Bernard Garfield (M.A. 1950) – bassoonist and composer
- Art Garfunkel (B.A. 1965, art history; M.A. 1965, mathematics; A.B.D.) – Grammy-award-winning singer, poet, Golden Globe-nominated actor, songwriter of Simon and Garfunkel
- Allen Ginsberg (B.A. 1948) – Beat Generation poet, National Book Award for Poetry; The Fall of America: Poems of These States
- Greg Giraldo (B.A. 1987) – comedian
- Joseph Gordon-Levitt (attended four years in GS; did not graduate) – actor, 3rd Rock from the Sun, (500) Days of Summer
- Gerrit Graham (attended) – actor, Phantom of the Paradise, Used Cars
- Lauren Graham (Barnard College; B.A. 1988) – actress, Gilmore Girls
- James Gunn (M.F.A.) – film director (Slither); screenwriter (Dawn of the Dead, Scooby-Doo); novelist (The Toy Collector)
- Jake Gyllenhaal (attended first two years) – Academy Award-nominated actor, Brokeback Mountain, star of Donnie Darko, Jarhead
- Maggie Gyllenhaal (B.A. 1999) – Golden Globe and Academy Award-nominated actress, Crazy Heart, Secretary, The Dark Knight
- Katori Hall (B.A. 2003) – playwright, journalist and actress; The Mountaintop
- Ed Harris (attended first two years) – Golden Globe-winning and Academy Award-nominated actor, The Truman Show, A Beautiful Mind
- Lorenz Hart – Broadway lyricist, collaborator with Richard Rodgers and Oscar Hammerstein II; wrote such songs as "Blue Moon", "The Lady Is a Tramp", "My Funny Valentine"
- Bhupen Hazarika (Ph.D. 1952) – Assamese lyricist, musician, singer, poet and film-maker
- Hikaru Utada (did not graduate) – Japanese pop singer; fashion model
- Lauryn Hill (attended first year) – Grammy-winning singer, songwriter, musician
- Boyd Holbrook – fashion model
- Katie Holmes (attended a summer session) – actress
- Nicole Holofcener (M.F.A.) – film and TV director, screenwriter, Friends With Money, Sex and the City, Gilmore Girls, Six Feet Under
- Famke Janssen (B.A. 1992) – actress, GoldenEye, X-Men
- Jim Jarmusch (B.A. 1975) – filmmaker, Dead Man, Ghost Dog: The Way of the Samurai, Broken Flowers
- Julia Jones (B.A.) – Native American actress, The Twilight Saga: Eclipse
- Judy Joo (B.S) – chef, author, host, Iron Chef UK, Korean Food Made Simple
- John Kander (M.A.) – lyricist who collaborated with Fred Ebb on such Broadway musicals as Cabaret, Chicago, Woman of the Year and Kiss of the Spider Woman and the soundtracks of Funny Lady and New York, New York
- Nicole Kassell (B.A. 1994) – director and producer of Watchmen, winner of the 2020 Directors Guild of America Award for Outstanding Directing – Drama Series
- Jean Kelly (B.A. 1994) – actress
- Alicia Keys (attended first year) – Grammy Award-winning singer, musician, composer
- Cinta Laura Kiehl (B.S. 2014) – Indonesian actress (After the Dark and The Ninth Passenger), singer (Cinta Laura Album), model and ambassador of anti-violence against women and children by the Indonesian Ministry of Women Empowerment and Child Protection
- Simon Kinberg (M.F.A.) – screenwriter Mr. & Mrs. Smith, X-Men: The Last Stand
- Ezra Koenig – musician, member of indie band Vampire Weekend
- David Kogan – radio writer and director; met his future radio writing partner Robert Arthur Jr. here in 1940, when both attended class taught by Erik Barnouw
- Joseph Kosinski (GSAPP) – television commercial and feature film director best known for his computer graphics and computer generated imagery work
- Joel Krosnick (B.A. 1963) – cellist; member of the Juilliard String Quartet; chairman of Cello Department at Juilliard School
- Robert Kurka (M.A. 1948) – composer, musician; the opera and instrumental suite The Good Soldier Schweik
- Tony Kushner (B.A. 1978) – Pulitzer Prize–winning playwright, Angels in America
- Claire Labine (M.F.A.) – head writer of Ryan's Hope, One Life to Live, General Hospital, Where The Heart Is, Guiding Light
- Yves Lavandier – screenwriter, director (Yes, But...), script doctor and author of Writing Drama
- Michael Lehmann (B.A. 1978) – director, Heathers, Hudson Hawk
- Sean Lennon (attended) – singer and songwriter, son of John Lennon and Yoko Ono
- Al Lewis (Ph.D. 1941) – actor, The Munsters; basketball scout; New York gubernatorial candidate; restaurateur
- Victoria Ann Lewis (M.A.) – actress and theatre creator
- Yo-Yo Ma (transferred to Harvard University) – cellist
- Arthur MacArthur IV (B.A. 1961) – concert pianist, writer, artist
- James Mangold (M.F.A. 1991) – filmmaker, Girl, Interrupted and Walk the Line
- Amber Marchese (B.A.) – television personality on The Real Housewives of New Jersey
- Robert Maschio (B.A. 1988) – actor, Scrubs
- Kate McKinnon (B.A. 2006) – actress and comedian
- Terrence McNally (B.A. 1960) – dramatist, winner of four Tony Awards, an Emmy, a Pulitzer Prize, and two Guggenheim Fellowships
- Eric Milnes – harpsichordist, organist and conductor
- Max Minghella (B.A. 2009) – actor, starred in Syriana and Art School Confidential
- Annie Moon (B.A. 2026) – singer, member of co-ed group "AllDay Project"
- Greg Mottola (M.F.A. 1991) – film director, Superbad
- Hari Nef – actress, model, and writer
- Rachel Nichols – actress, model
- Ronald Noll (B.A., M.F.A. c.1950) – conductor, music director, and television music supervisor
- Frank Nugent (B.A. 1929) – screenwriter, The Searchers, The Quiet Man
- Jack O'Brien – jazz musician
- Toby Orenstein (B.F.A.) – theatre producer, director, and founder of the Columbia Center for Theatrical Arts, the Young Columbians, and Toby's Dinner Theatre
- Jane Paknia (2022) – musician
- Lena Park (B.A. 2010) – Korean R&B singer
- Diane Paulus (M.A. 1997) – 2013 Tony Award; director of theater, opera; artistic director, American Repertory Theater, Harvard University (2009–)
- Amanda Peet (B.A. 1995) – actress, The Whole Nine Yards
- Kimberly Peirce (M.F.A. 1996) – filmmaker, Boys Don't Cry
- Anthony Perkins – actor, best known as Norman Bates in Alfred Hitchcock's Psycho
- Tess Posner – technologist and musician
- Martin Quigley, Jr. (B.A. 1939) – movie trade periodical publisher, author, politician, spy
- James Rebhorn (M.F.A. 1972) – actor
- Paul Robeson (J.D. 1923) – basso cantante concert singer, multi-lingual actor
- Amber Chardae Robinson (M.F.A. 2015) – actress
- Emmy Rossum – actress, Shameless
- Henry Alex Rubin (B.A. 1995) – Academy Award-nominated director, Murderball
- Cameron Russell – fashion model
- Aaron Schwartz (M.F.A.) – actor, director and copyright lawyer in Toronto
- George Segal (B.A. 1955) – Academy Award-nominated actor, Who's Afraid of Virginia Woolf?, Just Shoot Me!
- Jeffrey Sharp (M.F.A.) – filmmaker, Boys Don't Cry, You Can Count on Me
- Jenny Slate (B.A. 2004) – actor, former cast member of Saturday Night Live
- Scott Smith (M.F.A. 1990) – author and screenwriter, A Simple Plan
- Celine Song (M.F.A. 2014) – Academy Award-nominated screenwriter and director, Past Lives
- Anil Srinivasan – classical pianist and music educator
- Sarah Steele – actress, Spanglish
- Julia Stiles (B.A. 2005) – actress, Save the Last Dance, Mona Lisa Smile
- Richard Stoltzman (studied for Ph.D. in music) – clarinetist
- Stephen Strimpell (B.A., J.D.) – actor, star of the cult television classic Mister Terrific
- Rider Strong (B.A. 2004) – actor, Boy Meets World
- Conrad Tao
- Max Terr – pianist, arranger, bandleader, film composer, The Gold Rush, Stairway to Light
- Craig Timberlake (M.A.) – stage actor, opera singer, and later Columbia faculty member
- Chris Tomson – musician, member of indie band Vampire Weekend
- Darko Tresnjak (B.A. 1998) – theatre director
- Claire Unabia (G.S.) – contestant in Cycle 10 of America's Next Top Model
- Mario Van Peebles (B.A. 1978) – actor and director, New Jack City, BAADASSSSS!
- Heidi Vanderbilt – Broadway actress
- Alan Wagner (B.A. 1951, M.A. 1952) – first president of the Disney Channel; East Coast vice president of programming at CBS; radio personality; opera historian and critic
- Brian Weitz (B.A., M.P.A) – musician, member of band Animal Collective
- Robert Wisdom (B.A. 1976) – actor, The Wire
- Charles Wuorinen (B.A. 1961, M.A. 1963) – musician, pianist, and composer
- Brian Yorkey – playwright, screenwriter, Next to Normal, If/Then, 13 Reasons Why
- Remy Zaken (B.A. 2011) – Broadway actress

== Journalism ==
See also: Notable alumni of Columbia Graduate School of Journalism, Columbia College of Columbia University (journalism and media figures; and publishers), and Columbia Law School (journalists) for separate listing of more than 175 journalists, media figures, and publishers.

- R.W. Apple (B.S. 1961) – senior correspondent, associate editor, former Washington Bureau chief, New York Times
- Douglas Black – president of Doubleday and Company, 1946–1963
- Marcus Brauchli – managing editor, The Wall Street Journal
- A'Lelia Bundles (M.A. journalism) – journalist
- Greg Burke (M.A. journalism) – senior communications adviser with the Vatican's Secretariat of State (2012–)
- Diann Burns (M.A. journalism) – television news anchor; nine-time Emmy Award winner
- Whittaker Chambers – senior editor at Time, prominent contributor to National Review and other journals
- Hagar Chemali – political satirist, writer, producer, television personality, and political commentator
- Gina Chua (M.S. Journalism 1988) – executive editor, Reuters
- May Cutler (M.A. journalism) – Canadian publisher and journalist, founder of Tundra Books and the first Canadian woman to publish children's books
- Jamal Dajani (B.A. Political Science) – director of Middle Eastern programming, Link TV, producer of Mosaic: World News from the Middle East, winner of a Peabody Award
- Helen Dalley – Australian journalist; anchor with Sky News Australia
- David Ehrlich – chief film critic at IndieWire
- Yuval Elizur (M.S. Journalism) – journalist; covers the Israeli economy, globalization, and economic warfare; author
- Stéphanie Fillion (M.A., Journalism) – French-Canadian journalist and United Nations correspondent
- Max Frankel (B.A.) – executive editor, New York Times
- Melissa Fung (M.A., journalism) – Canadian CBC News journalist
- Nicholas Gage – investigative reporter, foreign correspondent, The New York Times (1970–80); journalist, The Boston Herald Traveler, The Wall Street Journal
- Robert Giles – curator of the Nieman Foundation for Journalism at Harvard
- Helen Gilmore – editor at Photoplay (also actress, composer)
- Caroline Glick (B.A. 1991) – American-Israeli journalist; deputy managing editor of The Jerusalem Post
- Hellar Grabbi (M.L.S. 1957) – Estonian-American journalist, essayist and editor
- Patrick William Graham (B.A.) Canadian journalist and screen writer
- Ashbel Green (B.A. 1950, M.A.) – vice president and senior editor at Knopf
- Ken Hechtman – maverick journalist jailed by Afghanistan's Taliban government as a suspected spy in 2001
- Jay Irving – reporter, cartoonist; father of Clifford Irving who is best known for perpetrating hoax biography of Howard Hughes
- DeWitt John (M.A. Journalism) – journalist and editor
- Casey Johnston (M.S. Engineering) – fitness writer and influencer
- Jay Caspian Kang (M.F.A. 2005) – writer and television journalist
- Neeraj Khemlani (M.S. Journalism 1993) – CBS News president
- Edward Klein (B.A., M.A. Journalism) – former foreign editor of Newsweek; former editor in chief of The New York Times Magazine; bestselling author
- Leonard Koppett – sports writer, columnist, author
- Steve Kroft – 60 Minutes; winner of three Peabody Awards and nine Emmy Awards
- Robert Krulwich (J.D. 1974) – media journalist, Alfred I. duPont-Columbia University Award, Emmy Award, George Polk Award
- Howard Kurtz (M.A. Journalism) – journalist and author with a special focus on the media; the nation's "most influential media reporter"
- Bernard Le Grelle (M.S. Journalism 1974) – journalist, author, political adviser, former United Nations expert and public affairs executive
- John Leland (B.A., 1981) – New York Times reporter, author
- Joseph Lelyveld (M.A., Journalism) – executive editor, New York Times
- Sharon Lerner – investigative reporter and environmental journalist
- Andy Levy – ombudsman, Red Eye with Greg Gutfeld, Fox News Channel
- A. J. Liebling (M.A. Journalism) – journalist closely associated with The New Yorker from 1935 until his death
- Thomas Lippman – journalist, author
- Robert Lipsyte (B.A. 1957) – winner of an Emmy Award in 1990, host of The Eleventh Hour on PBS, correspondent for The New York Times and ABC Nightly News
- Henry Demarest Lloyd (J.D.) – "father of investigative journalism"
- John R. MacArthur (B.A. 1978) – president of Harper's Magazine, political author
- Suzanne M. Malveaux (M.S.) – television news reporter; former White House correspondent for CNN
- Gabriele Marcotti (M.A., Journalism) – football writer for The Times, The Sunday Herald, La Stampa, Il Corriere dello Sport, host of Five Live Sport on Fridays
- Andrés Martinez (J.D.) – editorial page editor of the Los Angeles Times
- Cynthia McFadden (J.D.) – ABC news anchor, George Foster Peabody Award
- John McWethy – five Emmy Awards, Overseas Press Club Award
- Judith Miller (B.A. 1969) – former New York Times journalist; shared 2002 Pulitzer Prize for Explanatory Reporting
- Matthew Miller (J.D. 1986) – columnist and author, The Two Percent Solution
- Bill Minutaglio (B.A., M.S.) – PEN Center-award-winning author, journalist, professor, author of books including First Son: George W. Bush & The Bush Family Dynasty; City on Fire; The Most Dangerous Man in America
- Sheila Nazarian (B.A., Economics) – plastic surgeon and television personality
- Timothy L. O'Brien (M.A., Journalism) – author and journalist; edits and oversees the Sunday Business section of The New York Times
- Rita Omokha (M.S., Journalism) – journalist and author
- John L. O'Sullivan – editor of the Democratic Review during the 1840s; coined the phrase "manifest destiny"
- Frederick C. Painton – pulp-fiction author, WWII war correspondent (the subject of Ernie Pyle's last column)
- Rob Parker (M.S. 1988) – Sports Journalist
- Basharat Peer – Kashmiri American journalist, script writer, author, and political commentator, Curfewed Night
- Martin Perlich – radio broadcaster and writer
- Ted Rall (B.A. 1991) – editorial cartoonist, Pulitzer finalist, columnist, pundit, author of Revenge of the Latchkey Kids
- Wayne Allyn Root – creator of Spike TV, Discovery Channel, CNBC; executive producer and host of Wayne Allyn Root's Winning Edge and King of Vegas; anchorman and host of Financial News Network
- Claire Shipman (B.A. 1986) – Senior National Correspondent for ABC; winner of an Emmy Award for her CNN coverage of the Tiananmen Square protests of 1989; her work contributed to CNN winning a Peabody Award for its coverage of the Soviet coup attempt of 1991
- Tanya Simon (B.A.) – executive producer of 60 Minutes
- Howard Simons – former curator of the Nieman Foundation for Journalism at Harvard
- Allan Sloan – seven-time winner of Gerald Loeb Award
- Richard Smith (M.I.A., M.S. 1970) – CEO of Newsweek
- Sreenath Sreenivasan (M.S. 1993) – academic administrator, professor and technology journalist
- Neil Strauss (B.A. 1991) – journalist; author of The Game: Penetrating the Secret Society of Pickup Artists
- Arthur Hays Sulzberger (M.S. 1993) – publisher of The New York Times (1935–1961)
- Arthur Ochs Sulzberger, Sr. (B.A. 1951) – publisher and businessman; former publisher of The New York Times; and chairman of the board of The New York Times Company
- Ron Suskind (M.A. 1983) – journalist, author
- Dina Temple-Raston – NPR's counterterrorism correspondent
- Tiziano Terzani – reporter and correspondent
- Liz Trotta – journalist, three Emmy Awards and two Overseas Press Club awards
- Mariana van Zeller (M.A. journalism 02) – Portuguese journalist; 2011 Livingston Award; 2010 Peabody Award; 2009 Webby Award
- Steven Waldman (B.A.) – political journalist; senior advisor to the Chairman of the United States Federal Communications Commission (October 2009–)
- Richard Watts, Jr. – longtime theatre critic for the New York Post
- Bari Weiss (2007) – opinion writer and editor
- Gideon Yago (B.A. 2000) – MTV News correspondent

== National Book Awards ==
- John Ashbery (M.A. 1951) – National Book Award, National Book Critics Circle Award
- John Berryman – National Book Award, Bollingen Prize
- Karen Brazell (Ph.D.) – National Book Award
- Robert Caro – National Book Award, two National Book Critics Circle Awards, Francis Parkman Prize
- Lennard J. Davis (B.A., M.A., M.Phil, Ph.D., 1976) – National Book Award
- E.L. Doctorow – National Book Award, National Humanities Medal, three National Book Critics Circle Awards
- Jason Epstein (B.A. 1949) – National Book Award; co-founded The New York Review of Books
- Paula Fox – National Book Award (1983), Hans Christian Andersen Medal
- Peter Gay (M.A. 1947, Ph.D. 1951) – National Book Award
- Allen Ginsberg – National Book Award; one of the leading figures of the Beat Generation in the 1950s
- Stephen Jay Gould – National Book Award, National Book Critics Circle Award
- Lillian Hellman (attended) – National Book Award, 1976 Edward MacDowell Medal and Paul Robeson Award
- Herbert Kohl – National Book Award
- Jerzy Kosinski (B.A. 1965) – National Book Award
- Jane Kramer (M.A.) – National Book Award for Nonfiction, National Magazine Award
- Joseph Wood Krutch (M.A., Ph.D.) – National Book Award
- Christopher Lasch – National Book Award
- Joseph P. Lash (M.A. 1932) – National Book Award, Francis Parkman Prize
- Ursula K. Le Guin – National Book Award, five Hugo Awards, six Nebula Awards
- Oscar Lewis (Ph.D.) – National Book Award
- Salvador Luria – National Book Award in Science, Nobel laureate
- Bernard Malamud – twice winner of National Book Award, O. Henry Award
- Ralph Manheim – National Book Award
- Robert Nozick – National Book Award
- Walker Percy (M.D. 1941) – National Book Award
- Gregory Rabassa (Ph.D.) – National Book Award, National Medal of Arts (2006)
- Robert V. Remini (M.A. 1947, Ph.D. 1951) – National Book Award; appointed historian of the United States House of Representatives
- Edward Seidensticker (M.A.) – National Book Award
- Francis Steegmuller (B.A. 1927) – twice winner of National Book Award
- Gerald Stern (M.A. 1949) – National Book Award, Ruth Lilly Poetry Prize
- T. J. Stiles (Ph.D., A.B.D.) – National Book Award (2009)
- William Troy – National Book Award
- Tim Weiner (M.A.) – National Book Award (2007)
- Eudora Welty – National Book Award, Presidential Medal of Freedom, National Medal of Arts
- Hans Zinsser (B.A. 1899, A.M. 1903, M.D. 1903) – National Book Award; bacteriologist and immunologist

== Pulitzer Prize winners ==
- Leroy F. Aarons – Pulitzer Prize for Spot News Reporting (shared)
- Elie Abel – Pulitzer Prize for International Reporting (shared)
- Herbert Agar – Pulitzer Prize for History
- Ayad Akhtar – 2013 Pulitzer Prize for Drama
- John Ashbery – Pulitzer Prize for Poetry, National Book Award, National Book Critics Circle Award
- Dean Baquet (B.A. 1978) – Pulitzer Prize for investigative reporting (1988); managing editor for news operations, The New York Times
- William M. Beecher (M.S.) – Pulitzer Prize–winning former Washington correspondent for the Boston Globe, Wall Street Journal, New York Times
- John Berryman – Pulitzer Prize for poetry
- Katherine Boo – Pulitzer Prize for Public Service
- Louis Bromfield – Pulitzer Prize for Early Autumn
- Ethan Bronner – Pulitzer Prize for Explanatory Journalism
- Geraldine Brooks – Pulitzer Prize for Fiction
- Edwin Burrows – Pulitzer Prize for History in 1999 for the book Gotham: A History of New York City to 1898
- Robert Neil Butler – Pulitzer Prize for General Nonfiction
- Robert Campbell – Pulitzer Prize–winning architectural critic
- Robert Caro – twice winner of the Pulitzer Prize for Biography
- Hodding Carter – Pulitzer Prize for his editorials
- Margaret Clapp – Pulitzer Prize for Biography
- Robert Coles (M.D.) – Pulitzer Prize for General Nonfiction (1973); Presidential Medal of Freedom, National Humanities Medal
- John Corigliano – Pulitzer Prize for Music, Academy Award, Grammy Award
- Holland Cotter (M.Phil) – Pulitzer Prize for Criticism (2009)
- Richard Ben Cramer – Pulitzer Prize for International Reporting
- Lawrence A. Cremin – Pulitzer Prize for History, Bancroft Prize
- Justin Davidson – Pulitzer Prize for Criticism
- Bob Drogin – Pulitzer Prize for Public Service
- Will Durant – Pulitzer Prize for Literature, Presidential Medal of Freedom
- Jim Dwyer – twice winner of the Pulitzer Prize (for Commentary and for Spot News Reporting)
- Jesse Eisinger (B.A. 1992) – 2011 Pulitzer Prize for National Reporting
- Andrea Elliott – Pulitzer Prize (2007); reporter, New York Times
- Eric Foner – 2011 Pulitzer Prize for History, Lincoln Prize, and twice winner of the Bancroft Prize
- Glenn Frankel – Pulitzer Prize for International Reporting, author
- Max Frankel – Pulitzer Prize for International Reporting
- Rachel Kaadzi Ghansah – 2018 Pulitzer Prize for Feature Writing
- Robert Giles – twice winner of the Pulitzer Prize (under his editorship), current curator of the Nieman Foundation for Journalism at Harvard
- Louise Gluck – 12th U.S. Poet Laureate, Pulitzer Prize, National Book Critics Circle Award, Bollingen Prize, Nobel Prize for Literature
- Juan Gonzalez – Pulitzer Prize, George Polk Award
- Charles Gordone – Pulitzer Prize for Drama
- Oscar Hammerstein II – twice winner of the Pulitzer Prize
- Anthony Hecht – U.S. Poet Laureate, Pulitzer Prize for Poetry, Bollingen Prize, Ruth Lilly Poetry Prize, Frost Medal
- Ellis Henican (CSL) – Pulitzer Prize for Spot News Reporting (shared) (1992)
- Marguerite Higgins – first woman to win a Pulitzer Prize for International Reporting (1951)
- Jim Hoagland – twice winner of the Pulitzer Prize (for International Reporting and for Commentary)
- Richard Hofstader – twice winner of the Pulitzer Prize (for History and General Nonfiction)
- Michael Holley – Pulitzer Prize for Meritorious Public Service (team)
- Tony Horwitz – Pulitzer Prize for National Reporting
- Richard Howard – Pulitzer Prize for Poetry, American Book Award, Pen Translation Prize
- Nigel Jaquiss – 2005 Pulitzer Prize for Investigative Reporting
- Margo Jefferson – Pulitzer Prize for Criticism
- William Jorden – Pulitzer Prize for International Reporting (shared) and U.S. ambassador to Panama
- Jodi Kantor – 2018 Pulitzer Prize for Public Service (shared)
- Frederick Kempe – twice winner of the Pulitzer Prize (both team)
- Glenn Kessler – twice winner of the Pulitzer Prize (for Spot News Reporting)
- Kathleen Kingsbury – Pulitzer Prize for Editorial Writing; Opinion Editor of the New York Times
- Tom Kitt – Pulitzer Prize for Drama; Tony Award
- Carolyn Kizer – Pulitzer Prize, poet, three-time winner of the Pushcart Prize, Frost Medal
- Edward Kleban – Pulitzer Prize for Drama, Tony Award, Drama Desk Award
- Tony Kushner – Pulitzer Prize for Drama, two Tony Awards, Emmy Award, Whiting Writers' Award
- Joseph P. Lash (M.A. 1932) – Pulitzer Prize for Biography (1972)
- Joseph Lelyveld – Pulitzer Prize, journalist
- Leonard Levy (Ph.D.) – 1969 Pulitzer Prize for History
- David Levering Lewis – twice winner of the Pulitzer Prize for Biography, Bancroft Prize, Francis Parkman Prize
- Steve Liesman – Pulitzer Prize (team leader) for International Reporting
- Zhou Long – 2011 Pulitzer Prize for Music
- Bernard Malamud – Pulitzer Prize for Fiction, O. Henry Award
- John Matteson – Pulitzer Prize for Biography
- Terrence McNally – Pulitzer Prize, four Tony Awards, Emmy Award, four Drama Desk Awards, two Obie Awards
- Eileen McNamara – Pulitzer Prize for Spot News Reporting, Yankee Quill Award
- Louis Menand – Pulitzer Prize for History, Francis Parkman Prize
- Carol Marbin Miller – 2018 finalist for Pulitzer Prize for Investigative Reporting
- Judith Miller – 2002 Pulitzer Prize for Explanatory Reporting
- Steven Millhauser – Pulitzer Prize for Fiction
- Paul Moravec – Pulitzer Prize for Music
- Tad Mosel – Pulitzer Prize for Drama
- Mirta Ojito – Pulitzer Prize for National Reporting
- Sharon Olds – 2013 Pulitzer Prize for Poetry
- Dele Olojede – Pulitzer Prize for International Reporting, first African-born winner of the Pulitzer Prize
- Tim Page – Pulitzer Prize, music critic
- Gregory Pardlo – 2015 Pulitzer Prize for Poetry
- Michael Pupin – Pulitzer Prize, physicist
- Matt Richtel – 2010 Pulitzer Prize for National Reporting
- Richard Rodgers – twice winner of the Pulitzer Prize
- Carlos P. Romulo – Pulitzer Prize in Correspondhence
- Wendy Ruderman – 2010 Pulitzer Prize for Investigative Reporting
- Morrie Ryskind – Pulitzer Prize for Drama
- Carl Emil Schorske – Pulitzer Prize for General Nonfiction
- William Schuman – Pulitzer Prize for Music, president of the Juilliard School of Music, president of Lincoln Center
- Louis Simpson – Pulitzer Prize for Poetry, Prix de Rome
- Upton Sinclair – Pulitzer Prize, wrote over 90 books in many genres, his novel Oil! was the basis of There Will Be Blood (2007)
- R. Jeffrey Smith – Pulitzer Prize for Investigative Reporting
- Tracy K. Smith (M.F.A. 1997) – 2012 Pulitzer Prize for Poetry; 2006 James Laughlin Award; 2005 Whiting Writers' Award
- Paul Starr – Pulitzer Prize for General Nonfiction, Bancroft Prize, Goldsmith Book Prize
- T. J. Stiles – 2010 Pulitzer Prize for Biography
- Ron Suskind – Pulitzer Prize for Feature Writing
- William Taubman – Pulitzer Prize for Biography, National Book Critics Circle Award
- Edwin Way Teale – Pulitzer Prize for General Nonfiction
- Allan Temko – Pulitzer Prize, architectural critic
- John Kennedy Toole – Pulitzer Prize for Fiction
- Anne Tyler – Pulitzer Prize (Breathing Lessons), National Book Critics Circle Award (The Accidental Tourist)
- Irwin Unger – Pulitzer Prize for History
- Carl Clinton Van Doren – Pulitzer Prize, biographer
- Mark Van Doren – Pulitzer Prize
- Mike Wallace – Pulitzer Prize for History
- Charles Warren – Pulitzer Prize for History
- Tim Weiner – Pulitzer Prize for National Reporting
- Eudora Welty – Pulitzer Prize for Fiction, Presidential Medal of Freedom, National Medal of Arts
- Damon Winter (B.A.) – Pulitzer Prize for Feature Photography (2009)
- C. Vann Woodward (M.A. 1932) – Pulitzer Prize for History, Bancroft Prize
- Herman Wouk – Pulitzer Prize for Fiction
- Charles Wuorinen – Pulitzer Prize for Music, Guggenheim Fellowships
- Brian Yorkey – 2010 Pulitzer Prize for Drama; 2009 Tony Award for Best Score

== MacArthur Fellows ==
The following alumni are fellows of the MacArthur Fellows Program (known as the "genius grant") from the John D. and Catherine T. MacArthur Foundation. As this is an interdisciplinary award, fellows are listed here as well as in their fields of accomplishment.

- John Ashbery (M.A. 1951) – poet; MacArthur Fellowship
- Jacqueline K. Barton (Ph.D. 1979) – chemist; 1991 MacArthur Fellowship
- Terry Belanger (M.A., 1964; Ph.D. 1970) – historian; history of books, manuscripts, and related objects; 2005 MacArthur Fellowship; founding director of Rare Book School
- Edet Belzberg (M.A., 1957) – documentary filmmaker; 2005 MacArthur Fellowship; won Special Jury Prize, Sundance Film Festival (2001)
- Paul Berman (M.A.) – leading writer on politics and literature; MacArthur Fellowship
- Seweryn Bialer (Ph.D.) – political scientist; 1983 MacArthur Fellowship
- Katherine Boo (B.A.) – journalist and author; 2002 MacArthur Fellowship
- Rogers Brubaker (Ph.D. 1990) – sociologist; 1994 MacArthur Fellowship
- Robert Coles (M.D. 1954) – author, child psychiatrist, and professor at Harvard University; 1981 MacArthur Fellowship
- Wafaa El-Sadr (MPH) – infectious disease physician; 2008 MacArthur Fellowship; 2009 Rolling Stone's "100 People Who Are Changing America", Scientific American's "10: Guiding Science for Humanity" and Utne Reader's "50 Visionaries Who Are Changing Your World"
- Irving Feldman (M.A. 1953) – poet and professor of English; 1992 MacArthur Fellowship
- Randall Forsberg (B.A.) – expert in defense and disarmament as used for promoting democratic institutions; 1983 MacArthur Fellowship
- Stephen Jay Gould (Ph.D. 1967) – paleontologist, author; 1981 MacArthur Fellowship; Linnean Society of London's Darwin–Wallace Medal (2008); Paleontological Society Medal (2002); Charles Schuchert Award (1975); Phi Beta Kappa Award in Science (twice – 1983, 1990)
- Rosanne Haggerty (M.A. Arch.) – housing and community development leader; 2001 MacArthur Fellowship
- Shirley Heath (Ph.D. 1970) – linguistic anthropologist; 1984 MacArthur Fellowship
- John Hollander (B.A.) – poet, 1990 MacArthur Fellowship, Bollingen Prize (1983); Poet Laureate, State of Connecticut (2006–2011)
- Richard Howard (B.A. 1951) – poet, literary critic, essayist, translator; MacArthur Fellowship; PEN Translation Prize; Poet Laureate, State of New York (1994–97)
- David Keightley (Ph.D.) – sinologist, historian; 1986 MacArthur Fellowship
- Harlan Lane (B.S., M.S. 1958) – psychologist; 1991 MacArthur Fellowship
- Lawrence W. Levine (M.A., Ph.D.) – historian; 1983 MacArthur Fellowship
- David Levering Lewis (M.A. 1959) – professor of History; MacArthur Fellowship
- Ralph Manheim – English translator of major German, French works; 1983 MacArthur Fellowship; PEN Translation Prize (1964); PEN/Ralph Manheim Medal for Translation
- Campbell McGrath (M.F.A. 1988) – poet; MacArthur Fellowship; Kingsley Tufts Poetry Award, Pushcart Prize, three Academy of American Poets Prizes
- Dinaw Mengestu (M.F.A.) – novelist and writer; 2012 MacArthur Fellowship
- Richard A. Muller (B.A.) – physicist; 1982 MacArthur Fellowship; known for astrophysics, radioisotope dating, optics and climate change
- Pepon Osorio (M.A. 1985) – Latino artist; 1999 MacArthur Fellowship
- George Oster (Ph.D.) – mathematical biologist; 1984 MacArthur Fellowship
- Rosalind P. Petchesky (Ph.D.) – political scientist; 1995 MacArthur Fellowship
- Terry Plank (Ph.D. 1993) – geologist, volcanologist and professor, Lamont Doherty Earth Observatory; 2012 MacArthur Fellowship
- Anna Curtenius Roosevelt (Ph.D.) – archaeologist; 1988 MacArthur Fellowship; curator of Archaeology, Field Museum (1991–02)
- Meyer Schapiro (B.A., Ph.D.) – Lithuanian-born American art historian; MacArthur Fellowship; known for forging new art historical methodologies
- Stephen Schneider (B.S. 1967, Ph.D., mechanical engineering, plasma physics, 1971) – environmental biologist, climatologist; 1992 MacArthur Fellowship; Intergovernmental Panel on Climate Change, to which he made significant contributions, shared in the 2007 Nobel Peace Prize
- Carl Emil Schorske (B.A. 1936) – cultural historian; 1981 MacArthur Fellowship
- Ricardo Scofidio (M.Arch. 1960) – founder, principal, Diller Scofidio + Renfro; in 1991, one of the first architects to win MacArthur Prize "genius grant"
- Sally Temple (postdoctoral fellowship) – developmental neuroscientist; innovator in field of stem cells, specifically neural stem cells; 2008 MacArthur Fellowship
- Camilo José Vergara (M.A. 1977, Ph.D. not yet awarded) – writer, photographer, documentarian; 2002 MacArthur Fellowship; 2010 Berlin Prize
- Alisa Weilerstein (B.A. 2004) – cellist; 2011 MacArthur Fellowship
- Anders Winroth (M.A., Ph.D.) – professor of medieval history, Yale; 2003 MacArthur Fellowship
- Irene J. Winter (Ph.D.) – art historian; 1983 MacArthur Fellowship
- Lawrence S. Wittner (B.A. 1962; Ph.D., in history, 1967) – historian; MacArthur Fellowship
- Eric Wolf (Ph.D.) – anthropologist; MacArthur Fellowship
- Charles Wuorinen (B.A. 1961, M.A. 1963) – composer; 1985 MacArthur Fellowship

== National Medal of Science ==
- Jan Drewes Achenbach (post-doc research) – mechanical engineer; National Medal of Science (2005)
- Fay Ajzenberg-Selove (M.D. 1904) – German-American physicist; recipient, 2007 National Medal of Science
- Kenneth Arrow (M.S., Ph.D.) – economist; National Medal of Science (2004), John Bates Clark Medal (1957), von Neumann Theory Prize (1986); Arrow's impossibility theorem
- Francisco J. Ayala (Ph.D. 1964) – evolutionary biologist and geneticist, National Medal of Science (2001)
- John Backus (B.S., mathematics, 1949) – co-inventor of Fortran programming language, National Medal of Science (1975), Turing Award, Draper Prize
- Jacqueline K. Barton (Ph.D. 1979) – chemist; National Medal of Science (2011); NSF Waterman Award (1985), ACS Gibbs Medal (2006), Weizmann Women & Science Award
- Baruj Benacerraf (B.S.) – Venezuelan immunologist, National Medal of Science
- Konrad Emil Bloch (Ph.D. 1938) – biochemist; 1988 National Medal of Science
- Wallace Smith Broecker (B.S. 1953, Ph.D. 1958) – Crafoord Prize in Geoscience, National Medal of Science
- Shu Chien (Ph.D. 1957) – biological scientist, engineer; National Medal of Science; National Academy of Sciences, National Academy of Engineering, Institute of Medicine, American Academy of Arts and Sciences
- Mildred Cohn (M.S., Ph.D.) – biochemist, National Medal of Science
- Daniel C. Drucker (B.S., M.S., Ph.D. 1939) – mechanical engineer; authority on theory of plasticity; National Medal of Science; Timoshenko Medal; Drucker Medal
- Val Logsdon Fitch (Ph.D.) – nuclear physicist, National Medal of Science
- Milton Friedman (Ph.D. 1946) – economist; John Bates Clark Medal (1951); National Medal of Science (1988); Presidential Medal of Freedom (1988)
- James Glimm (Ph.D.) – mathematical physicist, National Medal of Science, Priestley Medal
- Louis Plack Hammett (Ph.D.) – physical chemist; creator, Hammett equation, Curtin-Hammett principle; National Medal of Science, Priestley Medal
- Michael Heidelberger (B.S., Ph.D. 1911) – immunologist, Lasker Award, National Medal of Science
- Roald Hoffman (B.S. 1958) – chemist, National Medal of Science
- Elvin A. Kabat (Ph.D.) – biomedical scientist; National Medal of Science; one of the founding fathers of modern quantitative immunochemistry
- Rudolf E. Kálmán (Ph.D. 1957) – electrical engineer, mathematical systems theorist; National Medal of Science; Kyoto Prize; IEEE Medal of Honor
- Joshua Lederberg (B.S.) – molecular biologist; National Medal of Science (1989), Presidential Medal of Freedom (2006)
- Leon M. Lederman (Ph.D.) – experimental physicist, National Medal of Science, Presidential Medal of Freedom
- Robert Lefkowitz (B.A. 1962, M.D. 1966) – physician, Shaw Prize, National Medal of Science
- Raymond D. Mindlin (B.A., B.S., C.E., Ph.D.) – mechanician, National Medal of Science, Presidential Medal for Merit
- Walter Munk (undergrad attendee) – physical oceanographer; Crafoord Prize in Geoscience; National Medal of Science, Kyoto Prize, Vetlesen Prize
- Frank Press (M.A., Ph.D.) – geophysicist, National Medal of Science
- Julian Schwinger (B.A., M.D.) – theoretical physicist, National Medal of Science
- Alfred Sturtevant (Ph.D.) – geneticist, National Medal of Science
- Patrick Suppes (Ph.D. 1950) – philosopher, 1990 National Medal of Science; contributions to philosophy of science, theory of measurement, foundations of quantum mechanics
- John G. Trump (M.S.) – high-voltage engineer and physicist; National Medal of Science; National Academy of Engineering
- Harold Varmus (M.D. 1941) – director, National Institutes of Health; Nobel laureate; National Medal of Science; president and CEO of Memorial Sloan-Kettering Cancer Center
- Evelyn M. Witkin (Ph.D.) – geneticist; National Medal of Science; National Academy of Sciences; Thomas Hunt Morgan Medal

== National Medal of Technology ==
- Jan Drewes Achenbach (post-doc research) – mechanical engineer; 2003 National Medal of Technology; ASME Medal
- Edwards Deming (faculty 1988–93) – statistician; 1987 National Medal of Technology
- Walter Lincoln Hawkins (postgraduate research) – chemical engineer, chemist; 1992 National Medal of Technology; first African-American member, National Academy of Engineering; National Inventors Hall of Fame
- Robert Ledley (B.S., M.S. 1950) – professor of physiology and biophysics; 1997 National Medal of Technology; National Inventors Hall of Fame; pioneered use of electronic digital computers in biology and medicine; research led to invention of whole-body CT scanner;
- Arun Netravali (faculty) – computer engineer; 2001 National Medal of Technology; 1991 IEEE Alexander Graham Bell Medal; president of Bell Laboratories (1999–2001) and former chief scientist for Lucent Technologies

== Science, technology, engineering, mathematics ==
See also: Notable alumni of Columbia College of Columbia University (scientists and inventors) for additional listing of more than 28 scientists and inventors, Columbia School of Engineering and Applied Science for additional listing of more than 55 scientists, engineers, computer scientists and inventors, and Columbia University College of Physicians and Surgeons for additional listing of more than 100 physicians.

- Saul Amarel (M.S. 1953, Ph.D. 1955) – computer scientist and pioneer in artificial intelligence
- James Amrhein – executive director of the Masonry Institute of America
- Roy Chapman Andrews (M.A.) – dinosaur bone hunter; cover of Time magazine, October 29, 1923
- Mercy Amua-Quarshie (obstetrician-gynecologist)
- Virginia Apgar (M.D. 1933) – effectively founded the field of neonatology; created the Apgar score used to evaluate the health of newborn babies
- Edwin Howard Armstrong (B.S. 1913) – inventor of radio circuitry such as the regenerative circuit and FM radio; pioneer in feedback amplifiers; first Institute of Radio Engineers (now IEEE Medal of Honor); 1941 Franklin Medal, 1942 Edison Medal; National Inventors Hall of Fame
- Oswald Avery (M.D. 1904) – discoverer of DNA's role in transmitting genetic information
- John Backus (B.S. mathematics, 1949) – inventor of Fortran programming language; won Turing Award; Draper Prize
- T. Romeyn Beck (M.D.) – forensic medicine pioneer
- Baruj Benacerraf (B.S.) – Venezuelan immunologist, National Medal of Science
- H. I. Biegeleisen (B.S.) – physician and vein expert, pioneer of phlebology
- Ira Black (B.A. 1961) – neuroscientist and stem cell researcher; first director of the Stem Cell Institute of New Jersey
- Thomas Berry Brazelton (M.D.) – pediatrician; Brazelton Neonatal Behavioral Assessment Scale
- Thomas H. Chilton (B.A. 1922) – chemical engineer; a founder of modern chemical engineering practice; Chilton and Colburn J-factor analogy
- Mildred Cohn (M.S. and Ph.D.) – biochemist, National Medal of Science
- Marie Maynard Daly (Ph.D. 1947) – first African-American woman to earn a doctorate in chemistry
- Charles Drew (M.D. 1940) – inventor of blood plasma preservation system
- Helen Flanders Dunbar (Ph.D. 1929) – important early figure in U.S. psychosomatic medicine
- Noam Elkies (B.S.) – three-time Putnam Fellow; mathematician, co-creator of Schoof–Elkies–Atkin algorithm; chess master
- Joseph Engelberger ( B.S. 1946, M.S. 1949) – engineer and entrepreneur, often credited with being the father of robotics; 1997 Japan Prize
- David Eppstein (M.S. 1985, Ph.D. 1989) – computer scientist, mathematician
- James C. Fletcher (B.S.) – physicist, 4th and 7th Administrator of NASA
- Ferdinand Freudenstein (Ph.D.) – mechanical engineer, "father of modern kinematics"; National Academy of Engineering, National Academy of Science
- Tom Frieden (M.D., MPH) – director of U.S. Centers for Disease Control and Prevention (2009–); N. Y. City health commissioner (2002–09)
- Elmer L. Gaden (B.S., M.S., Ph.D.) – father of biochemical engineering; fifth recipient of 2009 Fritz J. and Dolores H. Russ Prize; National Academy of Engineering
- Richard D. Gitlin (M.S., Eng. Sc. D.) – co-inventor of DSL at Bell Labs, National Academy of Engineering
- James Glimm (Ph.D.) – mathematical physicist, Priestley Medal, National Medal of Science
- Alfred Norton Goldsmith – (Ph.D.) – electrical engineer; IEEE Medal of Honor
- Gordon Gould (work toward Ph.D., did not complete) – inventor of the laser
- Benjamin Graham (B.A. 1914) – father of modern security analysis and value investing, taught Warren Buffett
- Louis Pope Gratacap (Ph.B. 1876) – curator of mineralogy at the American Museum of Natural History
- Ione Grogan (M.S. 1928) – mathematician, academic, and educator
- Robert Grubbs (Ph.D. 1968) – chemist, 2005 Nobel laureate
- William Stewart Halsted (M.D.) – thought by many to be the most innovative, influential and important US surgeon
- Louis Plack Hammett (Ph.D.) – physical chemist; creator of Hammett equation; namesake of Curtin-Hammett principle; Priestley Medal, National Medal of Science
- Tsuruko Haraguchi (Ph.D. 1912) – psychologist
- Benjamin Harrow (B.S. 1911, A.M. 1912 and Ph.D.1913) – biochemist, nutritionist, science writer and academic
- Walter Lincoln Hawkins (postgraduate research) – chemical engineer, chemist; first African-American member, National Academy of Engineering; 1992 National Medal of Technology; National Inventors Hall of Fame
- Gustav A. Hedlund (M.A.) – mathematician, one of the founders of symbolic and topological dynamics
- Michael Heidelberger – immunologist, Lasker Award, National Medal of Science
- Jean Emily Henley (M.D. 1940) – wrote the first German anesthesia textbook after World War II
- Herman Hollerith (B.S. 1879, Ph.D.) – statistician who developed a mechanical tabulator; founder of one of the companies that later merged and became IBM
- Robert Jastrow (B.A, M.A. Ph.D.) – astronomer
- Arthur Jensen (Ph.D. 1956) – known for work in psychometrics and differential psychology; educational psychologist who argued for heritability of intelligence
- Edward Kasner (Ph.D. 1899) – mathematician, coined the term "googol"; Kasner metric, Kasner polygon
- Michael Katehakis (Ph.D. 1980) – applied mathematics and operations research, Rutgers University
- Marshall Kay (Ph.D. 1929) – geologist; known for stratigraphy; 1971 Penrose Medal
- Jane Kessler – psychologist, Lucy Adams Leffingwell Distinguished Professor at Case Western Reserve University
- Bernard Kirtman (Ph.D. 1961) – theoretical chemist at University of California, Santa Barbara
- Leon M. Lederman (Ph.D.) – experimental physicist, Wolf Prize in Physics, National Medal of Science, Presidential Medal of Freedom
- Robert Ledley (B.S., M.S. 1950) – professor of physiology and biophysics; pioneered use of electronic digital computers in biology and medicine; research led to invention of whole-body CT scanner; National Medal of Technology; National Inventors Hall of Fame
- Kai-Fu Lee (B.S. 1983) – prominent figure in Chinese internet sector; established China division, Microsoft Research; establishing China research division for Google
- John W. Marchetti (B.A., B.S. 1925; E.E. 1931) – radar pioneer combining government and industrial activities
- Warren P. Mason (M.A. 1927; Ph.D. 1928) – electrical engineer and physicist, known for founding distributed-element circuits
- Alva T. Matthews (M.S. Structures 1957; Eng.Sc.D. 1965) – research engineer in shock analysis
- Winifred Edgerton Merrill (Ph.D. 1886) – first American woman to receive a Ph.D. in mathematics
- Robert Mills (B.A.) – Putnam Fellow; physicist, specializing in quantum field theory, the theory of alloys, and many-body theory; Yang-Mills fields
- Jocelyn Monroe (B.S., Ph.D.) – winner of the Breakthrough Prize in Fundamental Physics for her work on neutrino oscillations
- Robert Moog (B.S.E.E.) – pioneer of electronic music, best known as the inventor of the Moog synthesizer
- Joel Moses (B.A., M.A.) – MIT provost and Institute Professor, author of Macsyma
- Roby Muhamad (Ph.D.) – sociologist and research in social networking and small world networks
- Hazel E. Munsell (M.A., Ph.D.) – chemist and researcher
- Eva Neer (M.D. 1963) – biochemist, G protein research discoverer
- William Nierenberg (Ph.D.) – Putnam Fellow; physicist, worked on Manhattan Project; director, Scripps Institution of Oceanography (1965–86)
- Jacob Noel-Storr (Ph.D. 2004 Astronomy) – astrophysicist; influential in astronomy education, outreach, accessibility, equity, inclusion and diversity
- Edward Lawry Norton (M.S. 1925) – electrical engineer, discovered the Norton equivalent circuit
- Rebecca Oppenheimer (B.A. 1994) – astrophysicist, discovered the first substellar object outside the Solar System
- Delia Oppo (Ph.D. 1989) – paleoceanography scientist
- John Ostrom (Ph.D. 1961) – paleontologist, father of the dinosaur renaissance
- Bedabrata Pain (M.S., Ph.D., Applied physics) – Indian inventor; CMOS image sensor, active pixel sensor, 87 invention patents; film director
- William Barclay Parsons (B.S. 1879) – civil engineer
- Frank Press (M.A., Ph.D.) – geophysicist, National Medal of Science
- Michael I. Pupin (B.S. 1883) – physicist and physical chemist; IEEE Medal of Honor, Edison Medal for his work in mathematical physics; Pulitzer Prize for his autobiography
- Hyman G. Rickover – father of U.S. nuclear submarine fleet; Enrico Fermi Award; U.S. Navy four-star admiral
- Ora Mendelsohn Rosen (M.D. 1960) – cell biology researcher
- Ruth Schmidt (M.S. 1939, Ph.D. 1948) – geologist
- Daniel Schechter (B.A. 1983) – psychiatrist, psychoanalyst, and developmental neuroscience researcher
- Rosa Schupbach (MS) – economist at the National Bureau of Economic Research
- Julian Schwinger (B.A., M.D.) – theoretical physicist, National Medal of Science
- Lao Genevra Simons (B.S. 1908, M.A. 1912, Ph.D. 1924) – mathematician and math historian, author of Fabre and Mathematics and Other Essays
- George Clark Southworth (graduate study) – radio engineer; pioneering contributions: microwave radio physics, radio astronomy, waveguides; IEEE Medal of Honor
- Benjamin Spock (M.D. 1929) – pediatrician, author of The Common Sense Book of Baby and Child Care; Olympic rower
- Emma Dietz Stecher (M.A. 1926) – organic chemist and professor at Barnard College 1945–1971
- John Stevens (B.A. 1768) – built first steam railroad, responsible for first patent law in the U.S.
- Helen R. Stobbe (M.S. 1931, Ph.D. 1947) – geologist and Smith professor
- John Stone Stone (1886–1888) – mathematician, physicist, inventor; influential in developing wireless communication technology, IEEE Medal of Honor
- Alfred Sturtevant (Ph.D.) – geneticist, National Medal of Science
- Shen-su Sun (Ph.D.) – geochemist
- David Tannor (born 1958) – theoretical chemist, Hermann Mayer Professorial Chair in the Department of Chemical Physics at the Weizmann Institute of Science
- Evelyn Butler Tilden (M.S., 1926, Ph.D. 1929) – microbiologist at National Institutes of Health
- Hing Tong (Ph.D.) – mathematician, algebraic topology; theoretical physics; known for providing original proof of Katetov–Tong insertion theorem
- Joseph F. Traub (Ph.D.) – computer scientist; National Academy of Engineering
- Neil deGrasse Tyson (M.Phil. 1989, Ph.D. 1991) – astrophysicist, science communicator; first and current director of the Hayden Planetarium
- Roy Vagelos (M.D.) – mastered three professions: medicine, science, and business
- Anastasia van Burkalow (Ph.D. 1944) – professor emerita, geology, Hunter College
- Harold Varmus (M.D. 1941) – director of the National Institutes of Health, Nobel laureate, National Medal of Science, president and CEO of the Memorial Sloan-Kettering Cancer Center
- Allen Whipple (M.D.) – surgeon known for pancreatic surgery bearing his name (the Whipple procedure), as well as Whipple's triad
- Terry Jean Wilson (Ph.D. 1983) – geologist, Antarctic researcher
- Nellie Choy Wong (Ph.G. 1920) – first Chinese woman to become a pharmacist in America
- Victor Wouk (B.A. 1939) – scientist and engineer; pioneer in the development of electric and hybrid vehicles
- Rae Wynn-Grant (Ph.D.) – large carnivore ecologist and advocate for diversity in STEM
- Lotfi A. Zadeh (Ph.D. 1949) – mathematician, electrical engineer, computer scientist, artificial intelligence researcher; founder of fuzzy mathematics, fuzzy set theory, fuzzy logic; IEEE Medal of Honor; National Academy of Engineering
- Bruno H. Zimm (B.S. 1941, M.S. 1943, Ph.D. 1944) – polymer chemist and DNA researcher; in statistical mechanics, the Zimm–Bragg model

== Astronauts and aviators ==
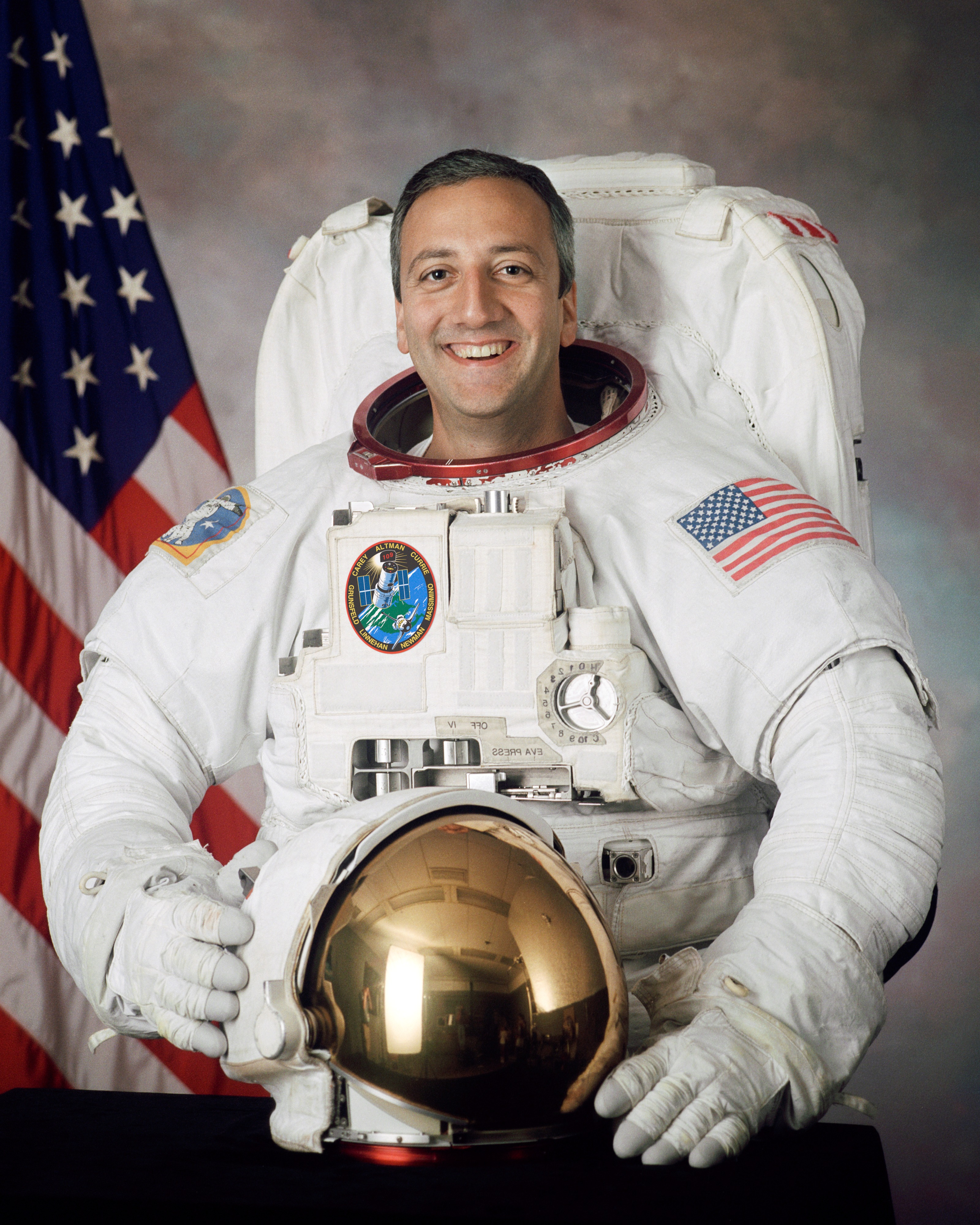
Michael Massimino

- Kenneth D. Bowersox (M.S. 1979)
- Kevin P. Chilton (M.S. 1977)
- Amelia Earhart (attended one semester, 1920)
- William G. Gregory (M.S. 1980)
- Gregory H. Johnson (M.S. 1985)
- Michael J. Massimino (B.S. 1984)
- Story Musgrave (M.D. 1964)
- Eugene H. Trinh (B.S. 1972)

== Academia: Presidents, chancellors, founders ==
- Carmen Twillie Ambar (J.D.) – ninth woman to lead Douglass College and 13th president of Cedar Crest College
- Frederick A.P. Barnard – president of Columbia; chancellor of the University of Mississippi; namesake of Barnard College
- Louis T. Benezet (Ph.D. 1942) – president of Allegheny College (1948–1955), Colorado College (1955–1963), Claremont Graduate University (1963–1970) and University at Albany (1970–1975)
- William Bizzell (Ph.D. 1921) – 5th president of University of Oklahoma, president of what is now Texas A&M University, president of what is now Texas Woman's University
- Sarah Gibson Blanding (M.A. 1926) – president of Vassar College (1946–1964)
- Joel Bloom (M.A., Ph.D.) – 8th president of New Jersey Institute of Technology (2012–)
- Lee Bollinger (J.D. 1971) – current president of Columbia; former president of University of Michigan; former provost of Dartmouth College; First Amendment scholar; defendant in two key affirmative action cases in the United States Supreme Court; chair of the board of Federal Reserve Bank of New York (2011)
- Albert H. Bowker (Ph.D. Statistics) – chancellor of City University of New York (1963–1971) and University of California, Berkeley (1971–1980)
- Harvie Branscomb (Ph.D.) – 4th chancellor of Vanderbilt University (1946–1963)
- H. Keith H. Brodie (M.D.) – chancellor (1982–1985) and president (1985–1993) of Duke University
- Harold Brown (B.S., M.S., Ph.D.) – physicist; former president of Caltech; former dean, School of Advanced International Studies of Johns Hopkins University
- John H. Bunzel (M.A.) – president of San Jose State University (1970–1978)
- Julian Ashby Burruss (A.M. 1906) – president of James Madison University (1908–1919) and Virginia Tech (1919–1945)
- Nicholas Murray Butler (B.A., M.A., Ph.D.) – president of Columbia University; Nobel laureate; president of Carnegie Endowment for International Peace
- Alfred Benjamin Butts (Ph.D. 1920) – chancellor of University of Mississippi (1935–1946)
- Colin Campbell (J.D.) – 13th president of Wesleyan University
- Daniel Chamovitz – biologist, author of What a Plant Knows, and president of Ben Gurion University of the Negev
- Margaret Clapp (Ph.D. 1937) – president of Wellesley College (1949–1966)
- Felton Grandison Clark (M.A., Ph.D.) – president of Southern University (1938–1969)
- Lotus Delta Coffman (Teachers College) – 5th president of University of Minnesota (1920–1938)
- Charles W. Cole (M.A., Ph.D.) – president of Amherst College (1946–1960) and U.S. ambassador to Chile (1961–1964)
- James S. Coles (B.S. 1936, Ph.D.) – former president of Bowdoin College
- Arthur G. Crane (M.A. 1918, Ph.D. 1920) – first president of Minot State University, president of University of Wyoming (1922–1941), 20th governor of Wyoming (1949–1951)
- Michael Crow (faculty) – president of Arizona State University
- Margaret Mordecai Jones Cruikshank (1911) – president of St. Mary's Junior College
- Richard Cyert (Ph.D. Economics) – sixth president of Carnegie Mellon University (1972–1990)
- Colgate Darden (1923) – chancellor of College of William and Mary (1946–47); president of University of Virginia (1947–59); namesake of Darden Graduate School of Business Administration
- Nicholas Dirks (faculty) – 10th chancellor-designate of University of California, Berkeley; professor of anthropology and history; dean of faculty of arts and sciences
- Herman Lee Donovan (Ph.D.) – 4th president of University of Kentucky (1941–1956)
- Blanche Hinman Dow (M.A., Ph.D.) – president of Cottey College (1949–1965) and president of American Association of University Women (1963–1967)
- John R. Everett (M.A. 1943, Ph.D. 1945) – president of Hollins College, first chancellor of Municipal College System of the City of New York, and president of New School for Social Research
- Claire Fagin (M.A. Nursing) – president of University of Pennsylvania (1993–1994)
- Livingston Farrand (M.D.) – 4th president of Cornell University and University of Colorado; public health advocate
- Saul Fenster (M.S.) – 6th president of New Jersey Institute of Technology (1978–2002)
- John Henry Fischer (M.S. 1949, Ph.D. 1951) – president and dean of Teachers College, Columbia University for fifteen years; as school superintendent, made Baltimore the first large American city to desegregate its public schools
- James C. Fletcher (B.A.) – president of University of Utah; head of NASA
- Guy Stanton Ford (Ph.D. 1903) – 6th president of University of Minnesota (1938–1941)
- William Trufant Foster (Ph.D. 1911) – first president of Reed College (1911–1919)
- Ellen V. Futter (J.D. 1974) – president of Barnard College (1980–93); president of American Museum of Natural History
- Harry Augustus Garfield (Law School) – president of Williams College (1908–1934)
- Gordon Gee (J.D., Ed.D.) – former president of Brown University; former chancellor of Vanderbilt University; twice president of Ohio State University; president of University of Colorado at Boulder and West Virginia University
- Harry Gideonse (1901–1985) – president of Brooklyn College, and chancellor of New School for Social Research
- Frank Goodnow (LL.B. 1882) – president of Johns Hopkins University
- Edward Kidder Graham (M.A.) – president of University of North Carolina (1914–1918)
- Frank Porter Graham – president of University of North Carolina (1930–1949)
- Frank Pierrepont Graves (Ph.D. Greek) – president of University of Wyoming (1896–1898) and University of Washington (1896–1898)
- G. Alexander Heard (M.A., Ph.D.) – chancellor of Vanderbilt University (1963–1982)
- Ernest O. Holland (Ph.D. 1912) – president of Washington State University (1916–1944)
- Andrew D. Holt (Ph.D.) – 16th president of University of Tennessee (1959–1970)
- Carl Hovde (B.A. 1950) – president of New School (1945–1950)
- George Ivany (M.A. 1962) – 7th president of University of Saskatchewan (1989–1999)
- Alvin Saunders Johnson (Ph.D. 1902) – president of New School (1921–1945)
- George W. Johnson (M.A., Ph.D. English) – president of George Mason University (1979–1996)
- William Hallock Johnson (Ph.D. 1902) – president of Lincoln University, 1926–1936
- Ralph Waldo Emerson Jones (M.A.) – president of historically black Grambling State University in Grambling, Louisiana, 1936–1977
- Thomas E. Jones (M.A. 1917, Ph.D. 1926) – president of Fisk University (1926–1946) and Earlham College
- Thomas Kean (M.A.) – president of Drew University; head of 9/11 Commission
- Kenneth H. Keller (B.A.) – 12th president of University of Minnesota (1985–1988)
- Eamon Kelly (Ph.D.) – former president of Tulane University
- Francis Kilcoyne – president of Brooklyn College
- Grayson L. Kirk (faculty) – president of Columbia
- George Latimer (LL.B.) – regent of University of Minnesota
- John LeConte (M.D. 1842) – president of University of California Berkeley 1869–1870 and 1875–1881
- Joshua Lederberg (B.A. 1944; graduate study) – former president of Rockefeller University; Nobel Prize–winning biologist; National Medal of Science; Presidential Medal of Freedom
- Umphrey Lee (Ph.D. 1931) – president of Southern Methodist University (1939–1954)
- Ronald D. Liebowitz (Ph.D. 1985) – president of Middlebury College (2004–)
- Peter Likins (faculty) – electrical engineer; president of University of Arizona; former president of Lehigh University
- Raymond Lisle (A.M. 1930) – attorney, officer in the US Foreign Service, and dean of Brooklyn Law School
- John V. Lombardi (M.A. 1964, Ph.D. 1968) – president of University of Florida (1990–1999); chancellor of University of Massachusetts Amherst (2002–2007); president of Louisiana State University System (2007–2012)
- Seth Low (B.A. 1870) – president of Columbia University; chairman of Tuskegee Institute (1907–1916)
- John Barfoot Macdonald (Ph.D. 1953) – 4th president of University of British Columbia (1962–1967); officer of the Order of Canada
- Alfred Thayer Mahan (attended two years) – president of U.S. Naval War College; author of The Influence of Sea Power upon History
- Anthony Marx (faculty) – president of Amherst College
- Ronald Mason Jr. (B.A., M.A.) – former president of Jackson State University and Southern University; current president of University of the District of Columbia
- James L. McConaughy (Ph.D. 1913) – president of Wesleyan University and Knox College
- Martin Meyerson (B.A.) – president of University of Pennsylvania; acting chancellor of University of California, Berkeley; president of State University of New York at Buffalo
- J. Hillis Miller, Sr. (Ph.D. 1933) – fourth president of University of Florida (1947–1953)
- John D. Millett (A.M. 1935, Ph.D. 1938) – 16th president of Miami University (1953–1964)
- Robert A. Millikan (Ph.D. 1895) – early president of Caltech (1921–1945); Nobel Prize–winning physicist; first to measure the charge of the electron
- David Wiley Mullins (Ph.D. 1941) – president of University of Arkansas (1960–1974)
- G. Leon Netterville (M.A.) – former president of Southern University (1968–1972)
- Abraham A. Neuman (B.A. 1909, M.A. 1912) – president of Dropsie College (1940–1966)
- A. Ray Olpin (Ph.D. 1930) – president of Utah University (1946–1964)
- Archie Palmer (M.A. 1927) – 8th president of University of Tennessee at Chattanooga (1938–1942)
- Christina Hull Paxson (M.A. 1985, Ph.D. 1987) – 19th president of Brown University (2012–); former dean and professor of Economics & Public Affairs at Princeton University's Woodrow Wilson School of Public and International Affairs
- Mario Laserna Pinzon (B.A.) – founded Universidad de Los Andes
- Peter Pouncey (Ph.D. 1969) – classicist; former president of Amherst College
- Mihajlo Idvorski Pupin (B.A., Ph.D.) – Serbian physicist and physical chemist; winner of IEEE Medal of Honor, Edison Medal for his work in mathematical physics
- Stuart Rabinowitz (J.D.) – 8th president of Hofstra University, former Hofstra School of Law dean
- Emanuel Rackman (B.A. 1931, LL.B. 1933, Ph.D., 1953) – Modern Orthodox rabbi; president of Bar-Ilan University
- Trudie Kibbe Reed (Ph.D.) – 11th president of Philander Smith College (1998–2004), 5th president of Bethune–Cookman University (2004–2012)
- Jehuda Reinharz (B.S.) – president of Brandeis University
- Ira Remsen (M.D.) – 2nd president of Johns Hopkins University (1901–1913)
- Nicanor Reyes, Sr. (Ph.D.) – founder and first president of Far Eastern University; president of Rockefeller Foundation; former provost of Yale University
- Brian C. Rosenberg (M.A., Ph.D.) – 16th president of Macalester College (2003–)
- David Sainsbury, Baron Sainsbury of Turville (M.B.A.) – chancellor of the University of Cambridge (elected October 16, 2011)
- William Schuman (B.S. 1935) – president of Juilliard School of Music; president of Lincoln Center; inaugural Pulitzer Prize for Music; founded Juilliard String Quartet; awarded National Medal of Arts
- Beheruz Sethna (M.Phil., Ph.D.) – president of University of West Georgia; professor of Business at the University
- Judith Shapiro (Ph.D.) – former president of Barnard College; anthropologist
- Phillip Shriver (Ph.D. 1954) – president of Miami University (1965–1981)
- Kenneth C.M. Sills – former president of Bowdoin College (1918–1952)
- Michael Sovern (B.A., Ph.D.) – president of Columbia University; dean of Columbia Law School; professor at Columbia Law School
- Niara Sudarkasa (M.A., Ph.D. Anthropology) – former president of Lincoln University in Pennsylvania
- Carrie Sutherlin (M.A. 1926) – president of Arlington Hall Junior College and Chevy Chase Junior College
- Henry Suzzallo (M.A. 1902, Ph.D. 1905) – president of University of Washington (1915–1926)
- Lida Lee Tall (B.A.) – sixth president/principal of State Teachers College at Towson (now Towson University)
- Stephen Joel Trachtenberg (B.A. 1959) – president of George Washington University and University of Hartford
- David Truman (faculty) – political scientist and educator; former president of Mount Holyoke College
- Andrew Truxal (Ph.D. 1928) – president of Hood College and Anne Arundel Community College
- Alfred H. Upham (Ph.D. 1908) – president of University of Idaho (1920–1928) and Miami University (1928–1945)
- Meyer Weisgal – president of Weizmann Institute of Science
- John Davis Williams (Ph.D. 1940) – president of Marshall University (1942–1946) and chancellor of University of Mississippi (1946–1968)
- George S. Wise – president of Tel Aviv University
- Harold Wren – dean of three law schools
- Robert Herring Wright – first president of what is now East Carolina University (1909–1934)
- John C. Young – president of Centre College (1830–1857); attended three years before transferring
- Michael K. Young (Law faculty) – president of University of Utah; former dean of George Washington University Law School

== Academia: Theorists ==
See also: above at Nobel laureates (alumni) for separate listing of more than 43 academics and theorists, notable alumni at Columbia College of Columbia University (academicians), Columbia Law School (academia: university presidents and legal academia), and Columbia Graduate School of Arts and Sciences (economists: natural scientists, social scientists) for separate listing of more than 163 academics and theorists.

- Mortimer Adler (Ph.D.) – founder of the Great Books movement
- Claude Ake (Ph.D. 1966) – Nigerian political scientist
- Encarnacion Alzona (Ph.D. 1923) – historian, National Scientist of the Philippines, first Filipino woman to receive a Ph.D.
- Michael Apple (M.A. 1968, Ed.D. 1970) – curriculum theorist
- Kenneth Arrow (M.S., Ph.D.) – economist; John Bates Clark Medal, National Medal of Science
- E. Digby Baltzell (Ph.D.) – sociologist, credited with the popularization of the acronym WASP
- Jacques Barzun (B.A. 1927, Ph.D. 1932; faculty 1932–75) – historian; 2003 Presidential Medal of Freedom; 2010 National Humanities Medal
- Steven M. Bellovin (B.A.) – computer scientist; one of originators of USENET; co-inventor, encrypted key exchange password-authenticated key agreement methods
- Ruth Benedict (Ph.D.) – cultural anthropologist, author of The Chrysanthemum and the Sword, a World War II-era study of Japanese culture
- Theos Casimir Bernard (Ph.D.) – accomplished practitioner of yoga and Tibetan Buddhism; scholar of religion; explorer
- Bernard Berofsky (Ph.D.) – philosopher
- J. David Bleich (born 1936) – rabbi and authority on Jewish law and ethics
- Walter Block (Ph.D.) – Austrian School free market economist
- Karen Boroff (Ph.D.) – Dean, Stillman School of Business, Seton Hall University
- Joseph Campbell (B.A., M.A.) – mythologist, writer and lecturer, best known for his work in comparative mythology and comparative religion
- John Maurice Clark (Ph.D. 1910) – economist
- Robert C. Clark (Ph.D. 1971) – dean and professor of Law, Harvard Law School (1989–2003)
- Rose Laub Coser (Ph.D. 1957) – sociologist, known with medical sociology, role theory, and sociology of the family
- Margaret Cuninggim – served as dean of women at the University of Tennessee and at Vanderbilt University
- Robert Dallek (M.A. 1957, Ph.D. 1964) – historian specializing in American presidents; winner of Bancroft Prize
- Wm. Theodore de Bary (B.A.) – East Asian studies expert
- Carl Neumann Degler (M.A., Ph.D.) – historian, Pulitzer Prize-winning author
- Donna Robinson Divine (Ph.D. 1971) – political scientist
- Norman Dorsen (B.A. 1950) – professor of Law at NYU Law School (Constitutional Law, Civil Liberties, and Comparative Constitutional Law)
- Irwin Edman (B.A., Ph.D. 1964) – philosopher and writer
- Richard Epstein (B.A. 1964) – considered one of the most influential legal thinkers of modern times
- Yael S. Feldman (Ph.D. 1981) – Abraham I. Katsh Professor of Hebrew Culture and Education and Professor of Hebrew and Judaic Studies at New York University
- Charles Ferster (M.A., Ph.D.) – behavioral psychologist
- Moses Finley (M.A., Ph.D.) – historian noted for his work on the ancient economy
- Joshua Fishman (Ph.D.) – distinguished linguist specializing in social linguistics, language and culture, and Yiddish
- George T. Flom (Ph.D. 1900) – distinguished linguist specializing in Scandinavian paleography and philology
- Richard Florida (Ph.D. 1986) – urban studies theorist; created concept, creative class and its implications for urban regeneration
- Kenneth A. Frank (M.A. 1964, Ph.D. 1967) – clinical psychologist and psychoanalyst
- Gilberto Freyre (M.A. 1922) – Brazilian sociologist, cultural anthropologist and historian
- Milton Friedman (Ph.D.) – free market economist; John Bates Clark Medal, National Medal of Science, Presidential Medal of Freedom
- Raymond Geuss (B.A. 1966, Ph.D 1971) – philosopher, political theorist. Fellow of the British Academy
- Allan Gotthelf (Ph.D. 1975) – philosopher, a recognized authority on the philosophies of both Aristotle and Ayn Rand
- Lynne Hanley (M.A.) – literary critic
- Edward Harris (B.A. 1971) – inventor of the Harris matrix
- Sidney Hook (Ph.D. 1927) – philosopher of the Pragmatist school; Presidential Medal of Freedom
- J. C. Hurewitz (M.A. 1937, Ph.D. 1950) – Middle East scholar, Columbia faculty 1950–84
- Jane Jacobs (two years of graduate studies) – urban theorist
- Raghbendra Jha (M.Phil 1976, Ph.D. 1978) – economist and academic
- Ira Katznelson (B.A. 1966) – political scientist and historian; When Affirmative Action Was White (2005)
- Donald Keene (B.A. 1942) – Japanese studies expert
- Samara Klar (M.A. 2006) – political scientist and founder of Women Also Know Stuff
- William Labov (Ph.D. 1964) – linguist, considered the founder of sociolinguistics
- Ruth Landes (Ph.D. 1935) – author, City of Women (1947)
- Paul Lazarsfeld – major figure in 20th-century American sociology; founder of Columbia University's Bureau of Applied Social Research
- Howard Lesnick (M.A. 1953, LL.B. 1958) – Jefferson B. Fordham Professor of Law Emeritus, University of Pennsylvania Law School
- Seymour Martin Lipset (Ph.D. 1949) – sociologist
- Liu Yu (Ph.D.) – Chinese political scientist and writer, faculty at Tsinghua University
- Paul Massing – sociologist in a group of Soviet spies at the University's Institute of Social Research
- Margaret Mead (M.S. 1924, Ph.D. 1929) – anthropologist; Presidential Medal of Freedom; Kalinga Prize
- Dwight C. Miner (B.A. 1926, M.A. 1927, Ph.D. 1940) – historian and Moore Collegiate Professor of History at Columbia
- Margaret Good Myers (M.A. 1922, Ph.D. 1931) – economist, author, and Vassar College professor
- Marysa Navarro (M.S. 1960, Ph.D. 1964) – historian
- Robert Nozick (B.A. 1959, summa cum laude) – philosopher
- Marvin Opler (Ph.D. 1938) – anthropologist and social psychiatrist
- Michael Oren (B.A., M.A.) – historian and author; Israeli ambassador to the United States
- Charles Patterson (M.A., Ph.D.) – author and historian
- Richard Popkin (B.A. 1950, Ph.D.) – academic philosopher, specialized in the history of enlightenment philosophy and early modern anti-dogmatism
- William Popper (B.A. 1896, M.A. 1897, Ph.D. in 1899) – professor of Semitic languages at the University of California, Berkeley
- Alvin Poussaint (B.A. 1956) – professor of psychiatry at Harvard Medical School; author of numerous books on child psychiatry
- Frank Press (M.A., Ph.D.) – geophysicist, work in seismic activity and wave theory, counsel to four U.S. presidents
- Murray Rothbard (B.A. 1945, Ph.D. 1956) – Austrian school free market economist, father of modern libertarianism.
- Steven Rubenstein (B.A. 1984, M.A. 1986, Ph.D. 1995) – anthropologist
- James R. Russell (B.A.) – Ancient Near Eastern scholar; professor at Harvard University
- Naomi Sager (B.S.E.E., 1953) – computational linguist; professor at New York University; pioneer in the field of natural language computer processing
- Marshall Sahlins (Ph.D. 1954) – cultural anthropologist; author of Stone Age Economics; professor at University of Chicago
- Edward Sapir (B.A. 1904, M.A. 1905, Ph.D. 1909) – linguist and anthropologist, co-creator of Sapir-Whorf hypothesis
- Andrew Sarris (B.A.) – film critic; a leading proponent of the auteur theory of criticism; controversialist
- Nathan A. Scott, Jr. (Ph.D.) – literary scholar and founder of the theology and literature doctoral program at the University of Chicago
- Anwar Shaikh (M.A., Ph.D. 1973) – professor of Economics; professor at The New School for Social Research of New York
- Mark Steiner (1942–2020) – professor of philosophy of mathematics and physics at the Hebrew University of Jerusalem
- Patrick Suppes (Ph.D.) – philosopher, National Medal of Science
- Lionel Trilling (B.A. 1925, M.A. 1926, Ph.D. 1938) – literary critic
- Immanuel Wallerstein (B.A., M.A., Ph.D.) – sociologist
- Victor Wallis (Ph.D. 1970) – political scientist
- Helma Wennemers (Ph.D. 1996) – organic chemist
- Philip L. White (M.A. 1952, Ph.D. 1954) – nationality historian and political activist in Austin, Texas
- Sean Wilentz (B.A. 1972) – chair of American Studies at Princeton University; winner of the Bancroft Prize in history
- Jay Winter (B.A. 1966) – World War I scholar at Yale University
- Thomas Woods (M.Phil., Ph.D.) – historian
- Aaron D. Wyner (Ph.D. 1963) – information theorist noted for his contributions in coding theory
- Howard Zinn (M.A., Ph.D.) – historian

== Sports ==
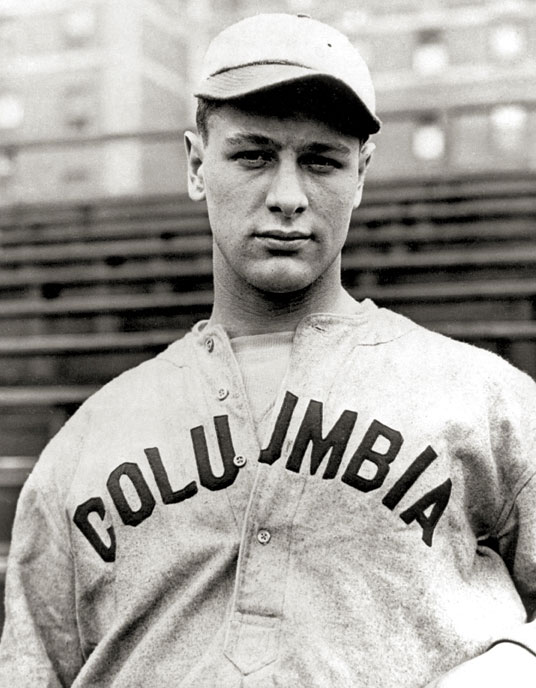
Hall of Famer Lou Gehrig

Hall of Famer Sandy Koufax

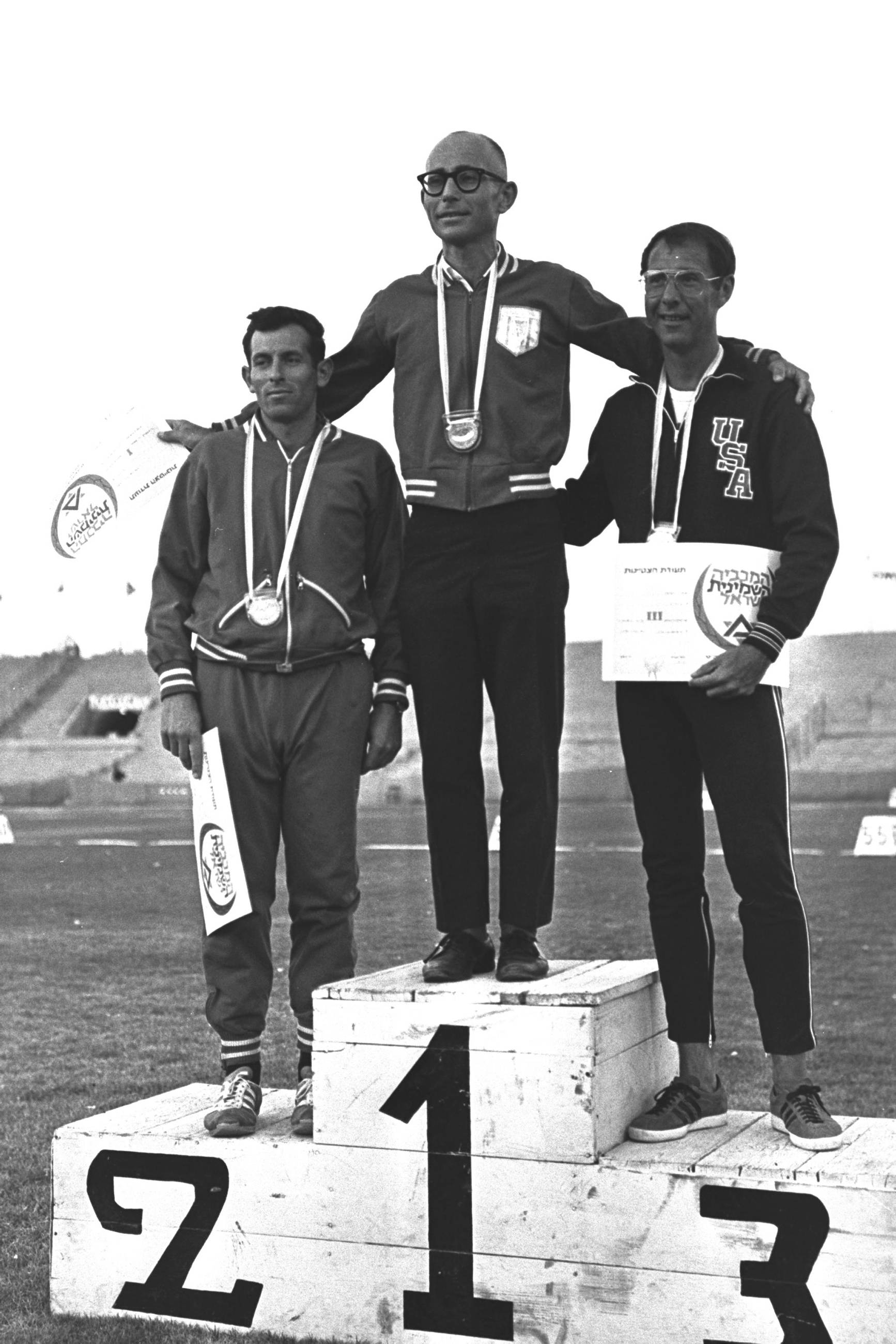
Olympian Shaul Ladany (center)

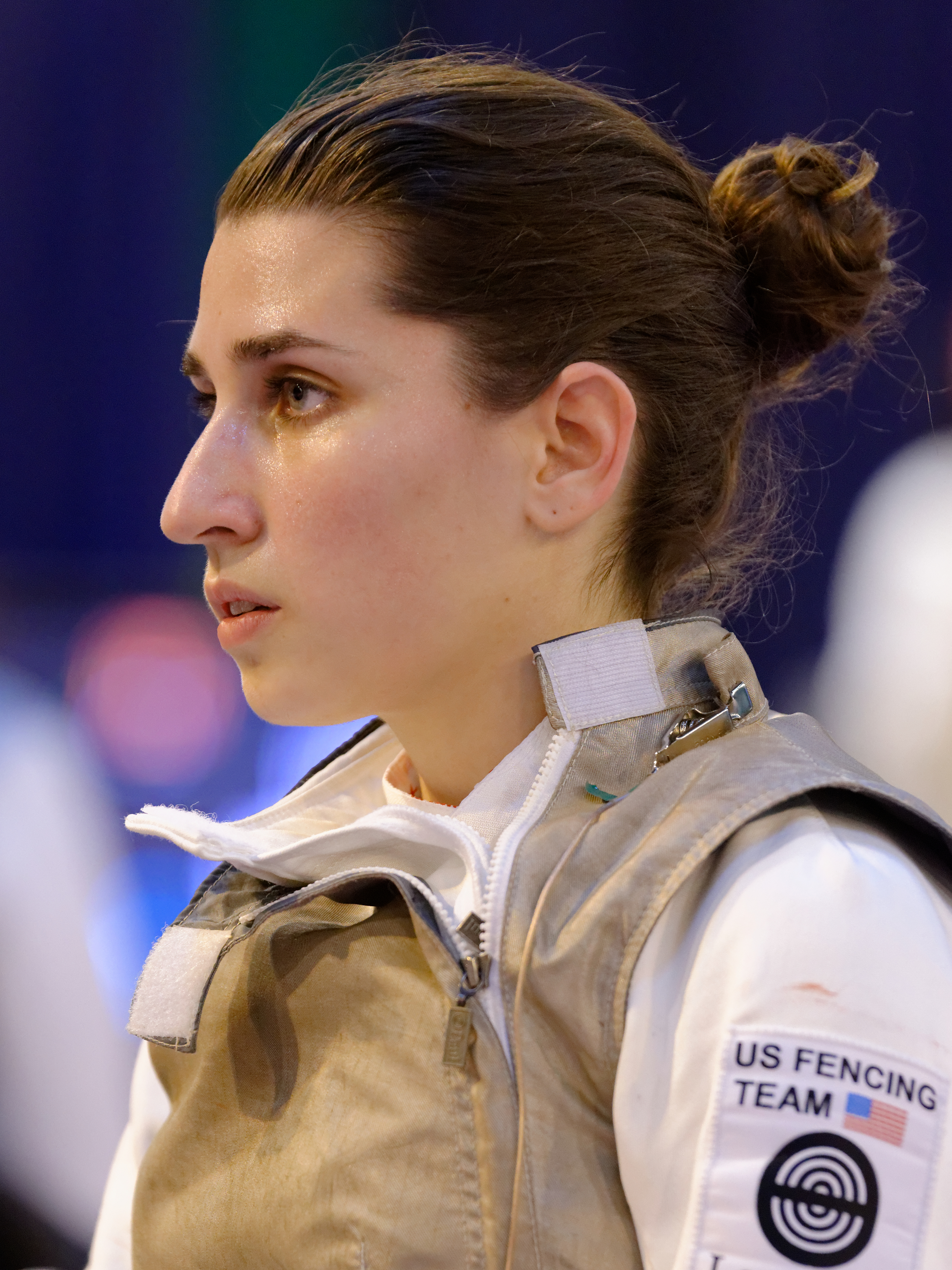
Olympian Nicole Ross

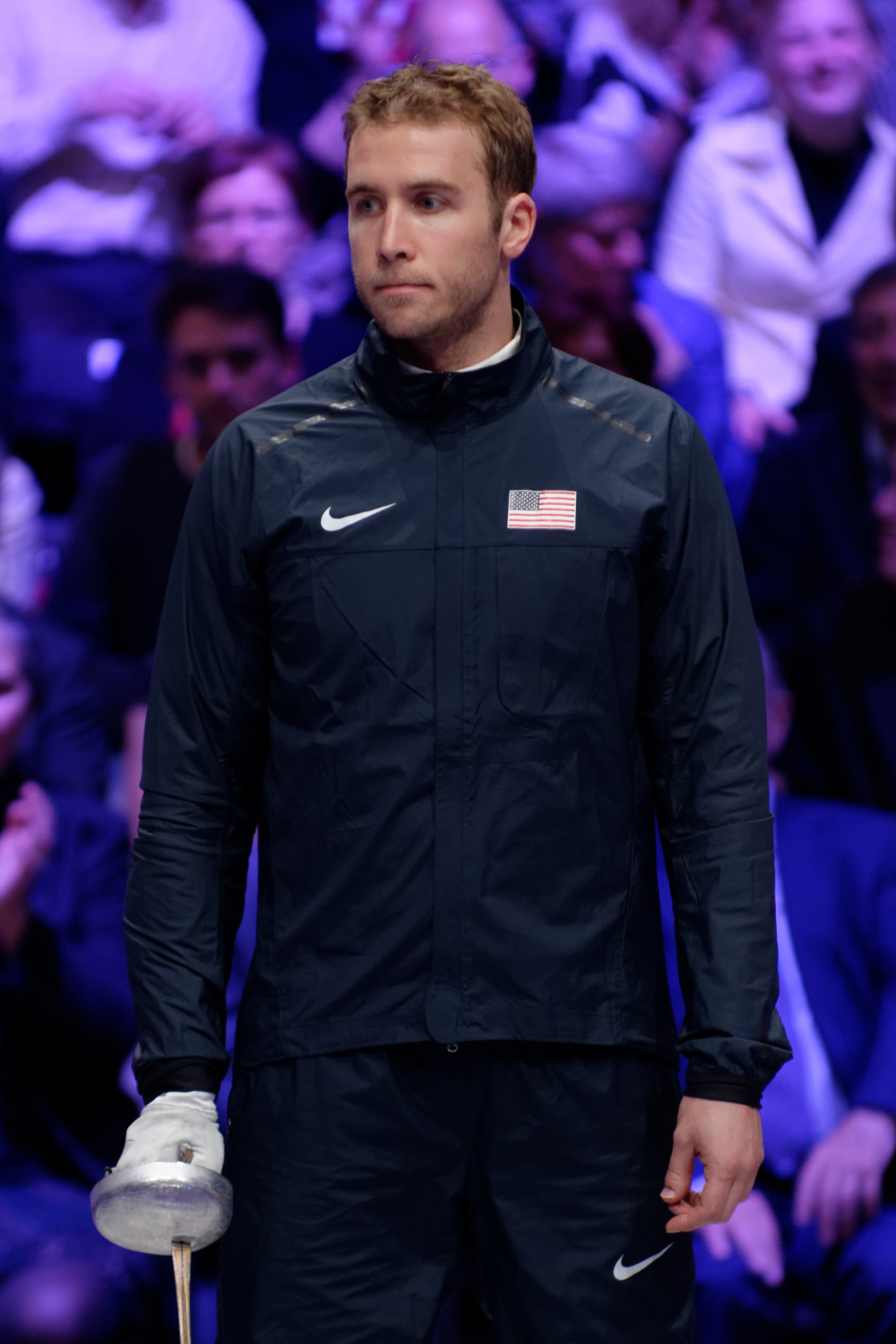
Olympian Soren Thompson

- Mario Ančić (LL.M. 2013) – Croatian former professional tennis player and current NBA executive
- Jessica Antiles (2019) – competitive swimmer
- Roone Arledge (B.A.) – pioneer of sports and news broadcasting with ABC; Monday Night Football, 20/20; winner of 37 Emmy Awards
- Norman Armitage (A.B and B.S. 1927) – 17-time national champion sabre fencer, and six-time Olympian, USA Fencing Hall of Fame
- Kyra Tirana Barry (B.A. 1987) – team leader for United States women's national wrestling team
- Lou Bender (B.A. 1932, LL.M. 1935) – pioneer player with Columbia Lions and in early pro basketball; later a trial attorney
- Edward Scott Bozek (1950–2022) – Olympic épée fencer
- William Campbell (B.A.) – chairman of the Board and former CEO of Intuit, Inc.; head football coach, Columbia University, 1974–79
- José Raúl Capablanca – world chess champion (1921–27)
- Isadora Cerullo – 2016 Olympic rugby player
- Jeff Coby (B.A. 2017), former professional basketball player
- Gary Cohen (B.A.) – New York Mets television play-by-play announcer
- Eddie Collins – Baseball Hall of Fame second baseman
- Caryn Davies (J.D. 2013) – rower, stroke seat in women's eight; gold medals, 2012 Summer Olympics and 2008 Summer Olympics; silver medal, 2004 Summer Olympics
- Jackie Dubrovich (B.A. 2016) – 2024 Olympic gold medalist, fencing
- Annie Duke – professional poker player
- Devereux Emmet (1885) – golf course architect
- Leo Fishel – Major League Baseball player
- Lou Gehrig – baseball player for the New York Yankees; enshrined in the Baseball Hall of Fame, suffered from amyotrophic lateral sclerosis ("Lou Gehrig's disease")
- Bruce Gehrke (B.A.) – NFL player with New York Giants
- Vitas Gerulaitis – professional tennis player
- Joel Glucksman (1970) – Olympic sabre fencer
- Bob Gottlieb – college basketball coach, earned a master's in physical education
- Bob Griffin (dropped out in 1970) – American-Israeli basketball player, and English Literature professor
- Alen Hadzic (born 1991) – épée fencer, suspended by Columbia under Title IX and banned by SafeSport for life for sexual misconduct
- Edward P. Hurt – Morgan's football, basketball and track coach
- Emily Jacobson (2008) – Olympic sabre fencer, junior world champion, USA Fencing Hall of Fame
- Ben Johnson (1914–1992) – US champion sprinter at 100 yards
- Jane Katz – Olympic swimmer
- Max Kellerman (B.A. 1998) – ESPN Radio host in Los Angeles and HBO boxing analyst
- Dan Kellner – four-time All-American, NCAA foil champion; national champion; two-time Pan American gold medalist; silver medalist; Maccabiah silver medalist
- Sandy Koufax – Baseball Hall of Fame pitcher
- Stephen Kovacs (1972–2022) – saber fencer and fencing coach, charged with sexual assault, died in prison
- Shaul Ladany (Ph.D. 1968) – world-record-holding Israeli racewalker; Bergen-Belsen survivor; Munich Massacre survivor; professor of Industrial Engineering
- Maya Lawrence (M.A. 2007) – fencer; bronze medal in the women's team épée, United States Fencing Team, 2012 Summer Olympics
- Howard Lederer – professional poker player; brother of Annie Duke
- Sid Luckman (B.A.) – football quarterback, enshrinee of the Pro Football Hall of Fame
- James M. "Jim" McMillian (B.A.) – NBA basketball player
- James Melcher (B.A. 1961) – Olympic fencer and hedge fund manager
- Cliff Montgomery (B.A.) – football quarterback; enshrinee in College Football Hall of Fame; captain and MVP of Rose Bowl-winning squad; Silver Star recipient in U.S. Navy
- Troy Murphy (B.A. expected December 2015) – former NBA player
- Nadine Netter – tennis player
- Dave Newmark – NBA basketball player
- Chris O'Loughlin (M.A. born 1967) – Olympic épée fencer
- Robb Paller (born 1993) – American-Israeli baseball player
- Fernando Perez (born 1983) – former Tampa Bay Rays outfielder, current San Francisco Giants coach
- Mark Pope (M.D. Class of 2010) – former NBA player; left Columbia before graduation to pursue a coaching career; now head coach at Brigham Young University
- Nzingha Prescod (2015) – Olympic foil fencer
- Camden Pulkinen (born 2000) – 2016 Youth Olympics team member and 2022 Winter Olympics alternate for Team USA; 2x world record holder
- Ian Rapoport (B.A. 2002) – National Insider NFL Network
- Archie Roberts (B.A. 1942) – played with the Miami Dolphins; subsequently became a cardiac surgeon
- Paul Robeson – football All-American, attorney, musician, activist
- Nicole Ross (2013) – Olympic foil fencer
- Bob Sheppard (M.A. 1933) – sports announcer, "voice of the Yankees"
- William Milligan Sloane – founder of the United States Olympic Committee
- Keeth Smart (MBA 2010) – Olympic saber fencer, silver medal, 2008 Summer Olympics
- Donald Spero (Ph.D.) – Olympic and world champion rower
- David Stern (J.D.) – NBA commissioner, 1984–2014
- Cristina Teuscher (B.A. 2000) – Olympic gold medal-winning swimmer, 1996
- Jenny Thompson (M.D. 2006) – former competition swimmer; won 12 medals, including eight gold medals, in 1992, 1996, 2000, and 2004 Summer Olympics
- Soren Thompson (MBA 2016) – Olympic épée fencer, team épée world champion, USA Fencing Hall of Fame
- LeRoy T. Walker (M.A.) – first black president of the United States Olympic Committee (1992–96)
- Marcellus Wiley (B.A. 1997) – football player, Pro Bowl and All-Pro defensive end
- James L. Williams (B.A. 2007) – Olympic saber fencer; silver medal winner, 2008

== Activists ==
See also: notable alumni of Columbia Law School (activism) and Columbia College (miscellaneous) for a separate listing of more than 50 activists.

- Bella Abzug (LL.M. 1947) – social rights activist and a leader of the women's rights movement
- Edythe Scott Bagley (M.F.A.) – civil rights activist, educator
- Anna Baltzer – public speaker and Jewish-American pro-Palestinian activist
- Ady Barkan (B.A., 2006) – healthcare activist
- Mark Barnes (LL.M. 1991) – advocate for public healthcare law at the state and national levels; co-founded the first AIDS law clinic
- Edward Bassett (LL.B. 1886) – a founding father of modern-day urban planning
- Lee Bollinger – advocate for affirmative action, defendant in Grutter v. Bollinger and Gratz v. Bollinger
- Robert L. Carter (LL.M. 1941) – civil rights activist, NAACP Legal Defense and Educational Fund general counsel, in which capacity he argued Brown v. Board of Education II
- Julius L. Chambers (LL.M. 1964) – civil rights leader, attorney, and educator; third president and director-counsel of the NAACP Legal Defense and Educational Fund
- Felix Cohen (1928) – advocate for Native American rights, fundamentally shaped federal Native American law and policy
- Roy Cohn (LL.M. 1947) – conservative lawyer who became famous during the investigations of Senator Joseph McCarthy into alleged Communists in the U.S. government
- Robert Cover (J.D. 1968) – civil rights and international anti-violence activist, professor at Yale Law School
- Annie Elizabeth Delany (D.D.S. 1923) – dentist and civil rights pioneer; subject, New York Times bestselling oral history, Having Our Say
- Sarah Louise Delany (B.A. 1920, M.A. 1925) – educator and civil rights pioneer; subject, New York Times bestselling oral history, Having Our Say
- Daniel DeLeon (LL.M. 1878) – socialist newspaper editor, politician, trade union organizer; regarded as forefather of idea of revolutionary industrial unionism
- Albert DeSilver (LL.B. 1913) – a founding member of the American Civil Liberties Union (ACLU)
- Barrington Dunbar (M.S.) – Quaker sociologist, economist, social worker, and activist
- William Dudley Foulke (LL.B. 1871) – reformer; principal reformers, New York State and federal civil service systems; early president of American Suffrage Association
- Ruth Bader Ginsburg (LL.B.) – women's rights advocate, co-founded the Women's Rights Law Reporter; co-authored the first law school casebook on sex discrimination; as chief litigator of the ACLU's women's rights project, she argued six cases before the U.S. Supreme Court
- Jack Greenberg (B.A. 1945, LL.B. 1948) – second president and director-counsel of the NAACP Legal Defense and Educational Fund; argued 40 civil rights cases before the U.S. Supreme Court, including Brown v. Board of Education (1954)
- Foster Gunnison Jr. (B.A. 1949) – LGBT rights activist and independent archivist
- Arthur Garfield Hays (LL.B. 1905) – civil liberties activist, general counsel for the ACLU, notable trials included Scopes Trial, trial of Sacco and Vanzetti, and Scottsboro case
- Dorothy Height (graduate study) – administrator, educator, and social activist; president of National Council of Negro Women for forty years; Presidential Medal of Freedom; Congressional Gold Medal
- Huang Wenshan (M.A. 1920s) – Chinese scholar of cultural studies and activist during the May Fourth Movement
- Charles Evans Hughes – a co-founder of the National Conference of Christians and Jews to oppose the Ku Klux Klan, anti-Catholicism, and anti-Semitism
- Ben Jealous (B.A.) – Rhodes Scholar; president and chief executive officer, National Association for the Advancement of Colored People (NAACP) (2008–)
- Steve Kelly – legal advocate for litigants who could not afford an attorney and for public housing tenants; consumer advocate
- Rushworth Kidder (Ph.D.) – founded the Institute for Global Ethics
- William Kunstler (LL.B. 1948) – civil rights and human rights activist; director, American Civil Liberties Union (ACLU) (1964–1972); co-founded Center for Constitutional Rights
- Corliss Lamont (Ph.D. 1932) – socialist philosopher, longtime director of ACLU (1932–1962); 1977 Humanist of the Year; 1981 Gandhi Peace Award
- Eugene Lang (M.S. 1940) – philanthropist, Presidential Medal of Freedom
- Mabel Ping-Hua Lee (Ph.D.) – as a teenager, led one of the biggest suffrage parades in U.S. history; first Chinese woman to earn a doctorate at Columbia
- Charles K. Lexow – first attorney for the Legal Aid Society of New York City; brother of Clarence Lexow (class of 1872)
- Li Lu (1996) – a student leader of the 1989 Tiananmen Square Protests, first student at Columbia to simultaneously receive B.A., M.B.A., and J.D. degrees
- Vilma Socorro Martínez – served for almost ten years as president and general counsel of Mexican American Legal Defense and Educational Fund
- Meghan McCain (B.A. 2007) – blogger and daughter of Arizona senator John McCain
- James Meredith (L.B. 1968) – American civil rights movement figure, first African-American student at the University of Mississippi
- Constance Baker Motley (LL.B. 1946) – attorney for the NAACP Legal Defense and Educational Fund (1945–64); Manhattan borough president (1964–66)
- Annie Land O'Berry – activist, relief worker, and philanthropist
- Kelly Overton – animal rights activist
- Antonia Pantoja (M.S. 1954) – Presidential Medal of Freedom; educator, social worker, feminist, civil rights leader and founder of ASPIRA
- Marshall Perlin (LL.B. 1942) – civil liberties lawyer, defended Soviet spies Julius and Ethel Rosenberg
- Anika Rahman (J.D. 1990) – president and CEO, Ms. Foundation for Women (2/2011)
- Paul Rapoport (J.D. 1965) – co-founder of the New York City Lesbian, Gay, Bisexual and Transgender Community Services Center and the Gay Men's Health Crisis
- Michael Ratner (J.D. 1969) – human rights activist on national and international level, current president of the Center for Constitutional Rights (co-founded by William Kunstler in 1969) – National Law Journal named him as one of the 100 most influential lawyers in the United States (2006)
- Imam Feisal Abdul Rauf (B.A. nuclear engineering, 1969) – American Sufi imam, author, and activist
- Paul Robeson (LL.B. 1923) – civil and human rights activist, international social justice activist, writer, Spingarn Medal
- Theodore Roosevelt – progressive reformer, conservationist, a leader of the Republican Party and the Progressive Party
- Menachem Z. Rosensaft (1979) – a leader of the Second Generation Movement of children of Jewish survivors
- Brad R. Roth (LL.M. 1992) – social and human rights activist, critic of torture policies in the administration of George W. Bush
- Charles Ruthenberg (1909) – founder of the Communist Party of America (1919)
- Nawal El Saadawi (M.A. 1966) – Egyptian feminist writer, activist, physician, and psychiatrist
- Mikheil Saakashvili (LL.M. 1994) – founder and leader of the United National Movement in Georgia (country), leader of the bloodless "Rose Revolution"
- Arthur B. Spingarn (B.A. 1897) – leader in fight for civil rights for African Americans, third president of NAACP
- Joel Elias Spingarn (B.A. 1895) – educator, literary critic, and civil rights activist; second president of NAACP; established Spingarn Medal
- Abby Stein (B.A. expected 2019) – trans activist, educator, model, and speaker. First Openly trans person, and rabbi, from an Ultra Orthodox Jewish community.
- Leon Sullivan (M.A. 1947) – Presidential Medal of Freedom recipient; civil rights activist; anti-apartheid activist; longtime GM board member; Baptist minister
- Franklin A. Thomas – president of the Ford Foundation (1976–91)
- Judith Vladeck (1947) – civil rights advocate, particularly on behalf of women; helped set new legal precedents against sex discrimination and age discrimination
- Wang Juntao (Ph.D. Pol. Sci., 2006) – an alleged head of 1989 Tiananmen Square protests
- Faye Wattleton (M.S. 1967) – president of the Center for the Advancement of Women, National Women's Hall of Fame
- Charles Weltner (1950) – advocate for racial equality, second individual to receive the John F. Kennedy Profile in Courage Award

== Fictional characters ==
- Grace Adler – Will & Grace
- Amy, one of the two leads in Booksmart, played by Kaitlyn Dever, is going to attend Columbia.
- Alexis Castle – Castle
- Matt Camden and Ruthie Camden – 7th Heaven; originally from Glenoak; went to Columbia Med School
- Dr. Eric Foreman – House, attended undergraduate school at Columbia
- Matthew Murdock, Esq. – Marvel Comics superhero Daredevil; Columbia Law School
- Dr. Victor Von Doom, Dr. Doom, Marvel Comics supervillain
- Marshall Eriksen (alumnus of Columbia Law School) – How I Met Your Mother
- Dr. Reed Richards, Mr. Fantastic – leader of the Marvel Comics superhero team the Fantastic Four
- Benjamin "Ben" Gross – Never Have I Ever; gets accepted into and attends Columbia at the end of the series
- Saskia Kupferberg – The Sopranos; attended Columbia College, Columbia University
- Peter Parker – Sam Raimi's Spider-Man films; Columbia University physics student
- Meadow Soprano – The Sopranos; alumna of Columbia College, Columbia University
- Jessie Spano – Saved by the Bell
- Asuka Sugo Future GPX Cyber Formula; Columbia University alumna
- Will Truman – Will & Grace
- Serena van der Woodsen – Gossip Girl
- Blair Waldorf – Gossip Girl
- Jamie Wellerstein – The Last Five Years; attended Columbia but dropped out upon finding success in writing
- Jeff Winger – Community; his diploma from Columbia Law School is discovered to be from the country of Colombia, and he is forced to attend Greendale Community College

== See also ==
- Barnard College of Columbia University
- Columbia Business School
- Columbia College of Columbia University
- Columbia Graduate School of Architecture, Planning and Preservation
- Columbia Graduate School of Arts and Sciences
- Columbia Law School
- Columbia University College of Physicians and Surgeons
- Columbia University Graduate School of Journalism
- Columbia University School of the Arts
- Columbia University School of General Studies
- Fu Foundation School of Engineering and Applied Science
- School of International and Public Affairs
- Teachers College, Columbia University
