= Jacob Noel-Storr =

Educator, EDI advocate, and astrophysicist

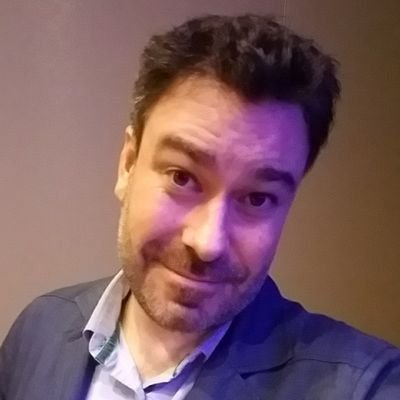
- Born: 29 May 1976 (age 50); Telford, England
- Education: PhD Astronomy, Columbia University (2004); MPhil Astronomy, Columbia University (2001); MA Astronomy, Columbia University (2000); MSci (Hons) Physics with Astrophysics, University of Birmingham (1998)
- Occupations: Astrophysicist; educator; Equity, Diversity and Inclusion (EDI) advocate
- Employer(s): University of Groningen, Rochester Institute of Technology (former), University of Arizona (former), Columbia University (former)
- Organization(s): Association for Astronomy Education, InsightSTEM, KNAC, NAEIC, International Astronomical Union, European Astronomical Society
- Title: X-Lab-PAM Team Leader University of Groningen and Co-chair Astronomy for Equity and Inclusion, International Astronomical Union EC Working Group.

Jacob Noel-Storr is an astrophysics researcher and science education and outreach specialist researcher, formerly the lecturer for practical astronomy and X-Lab-PAM team leader at the University of Groningen and president of InsightSTEM, Inc. He was an assistant research professor and director of the Insight Lab for Science Outreach and Learning Research at Rochester Institute of Technology, and assistant staff scientist in the Steward Observatory and Flandrau Science Center at the University of Arizona. He is known for contributions to the study of Active Galactic Nuclei / Supermassive Black Holes, as well as science / astronomy education and outreach.

Noel-Storr is known for work in equity, inclusion and diversity in astronomy including serving terms as co-chair of the European Astronomical Society Advisory Committee for Diversity and Inclusion in Astronomy (2019-2023), and co-chair of the International Astronomical Union Executive Committee Working Group on Astronomy for Equity and Inclusion (2021-2024), and a member of the Netherlands Astronomy Equity and Inclusion Committee.

== Published works ==
- "Accessibility in Astronomy for the Visually Impaired", Noel-Storr, J., Willebrands, M., (2022), Nature Astronomy
- "AstroDance: Engaging Deaf and Hard-of-Hearing Students in Astrophysics via Multimedia Performances", Nordhaus, J.; Campanelli, M.; Bochner, J.; Warfield, T.; Bischof, H. -P.; Noel-Storr, J. (2020) Journal of Science Education for Students with Disabilities
- "VLBA Observations of MRK6: Probing the Jet-Lobe Connection", Kharb, P., O'Dea, C.P., Baum, S.A., Hardcastle, M.J., Dicken, D., Croston, J. H., Mingo, B., Noel-Storr, J. (2014), ApJ
- "Innovative Low Cost Science Education Technology Tools: Increasing Access to Science for All", Noel-Storr, J., Cole, B. N. (2012) in "Connecting People to Science: A National Congerence onf Science Education And Public Outreach." ASP Conference Series, Vol. 457. Eds. J.N. Jensen, J.G. Manning, M.G. Gibbs, and D. Daou. San Francisco: Astronomical Society of the Pacific, 2012., p. 317
- "VLBA and Chandra Observations of Jets in FR-I Radio Galaxies: Constraints on Jet Evolution", Kharb, P., O'Dea, C. P., Tilak, A., Baum, S. A., Haynes, E., Noel‐Storr, J., Fallon, C., Christiansen, K. (2012), ApJ 754:1
- "Modeling the Infrared Emission in Cygnus A", Privon, G. C., Baum, S. A., O'Dea, C. P., Gallimore, J., Noel‐Storr, J., Axon, D. J., Robinson, A. (2012), ApJ 747:46
- "Hubble Space Telescope Far-ultraviolet Observations of Brightest Cluster Galaxies: The Role of Star Formation in Cooling Flows and BCG Evolution", O'Dea, K. P., et al. (Noel‐Storr, J. co‐author, 2010), ApJ 719:1619
- "NASA Family Science Night: Changing Perceptions One Family at a Time", Mitchell, S., Drobnes, E., Collina-Trujillo, M. S., Noel-Storr, J. (2008) Adventures in Space Research 42:1844
- "An Infrared Survey of Brightest Cluster Galaxies II. Why are Some Brightest Cluster Galaxies Forming Stars?" O'Dea, C. P., Baum, S. A., Privon, G., Noel-Storr, J., et al. (2008) ApJ 681:1035
- "Family Astronomy: Improving Practices and Developing New Approaches" Noel-Storr, J., Drobnes, E., Mitchell, S. E. (2008), in "EPO and a Changing World: Creating Linkages and Expanding Partnerships: The 119th Annual Meeting of the Astronomical Society of the Pacific" Eds, Catharine Garmany and Michael G. Gibbs (vol. 389, p. 309)
- "An Infrared Survey of Brightest Cluster Galaxies I", Quillen et al., (Noel-Storr, J. co-author, 2008), ApJS 176:39
- "Unveiling the nature of Seyfert nuclei with 1–100 micron spectral energy distributions", Buchanan et al. (Noel-Storr, J. co-author, 2008), Memorie della Societa Astronomica Italiana, v. 79, p. 1140

== See also ==
- List of University of Birmingham alumni
- List of Columbia University alumni and attendees
- List of Pi Kappa Phi alumni
