= Bernard Berofsky =

American philosopher

Education
- Education: NYU (BA), Columbia University (MA, PhD)

Philosophical work
- Era: 21st-century philosophy
- Region: Western philosophy
- Institutions: Columbia University
- Main interests: metaphysics, esp. free will, moral responsibility, autonomy, determinism, causality

Bernard Berofsky is an American philosopher and Professor Emeritus of Philosophy at Columbia University. Berofsky is known for his works on free will.

== Books ==
- Freedom from Necessity: The Metaphysical Basis of Responsibility, Routledge 1987
- Liberation from Self: A Theory of Personal Autonomy, Cambridge University Press 1995
- Nature's Challenge to Free Will, Oxford University Press 2012
- Determinism, Princeton University Press 2015
