= Bernard Kirtman =

American theoretical chemist

- Born: March 30, 1935 (age 91)
- Education: Columbia University; Harvard University
- Occupation: Theoretical chemist
- Spouse: Tybie Kirtman (died. 2022)

Bernard Kirtman (born March 30, 1935) is an American theoretical chemist. He is a distinguished professor in the department of chemistry and biochemistry at the University of California, Santa Barbara.

Kirtman attended Columbia University, earning his AB degree in 1955. He also attended Harvard University, earning his PhD degree in physical chemistry in 1961. After earning his degrees, he worked as a postdoctoral fellow at the University of Washington.

In 2005, Kirtman was awarded the ICCMSE Prize for theoretical and computational chemistry by the International Conference on Computational Methods and Sustainable Engineering.
