= Mercy Amua-Quarshie =

Ghanaian gynecologist

Mercy Amua-Quarshie is a Ghanaian obstetrician-gynecologist in Dallas, Texas. She earned the Berlex Labs award for best OBGYN teaching resident while completing her OBGYN residency at Boston Medical Center/Boston University.

Amua-Quarshie was born in Ghana, West Africa, but grew up in New York

She completed the Master of Public Health program at Columbia University in New York City in 1991. She graduated from New York University School of Medicine in 1995, and went to Boston Medical Center/Boston University for OBGYN residency study in 1999. She was named best OBGYN teaching resident and received a Berlex Labs award during her time there.

She returned to the greater New York region after completing her residency training in 1999, and worked in both teaching hospitals and private practice settings.

Amua-Quarshie and her family moved to the Dallas Fort Worth region, where she worked as an OBGYN hospitalist physician for several years in the Methodist Health system.

She is a certified menopause practitioner with the North American Menopause Society.
