= Kenneth A. Frank =

Kenneth A. Frank is an American clinical psychologist and psychoanalyst, and co-founder of the National Institute for the Psychotherapies in New York City, where he is Director of Training. A faculty member of the Columbia University College of Physicians and Surgeons from 1974 to 2009, he was Clinical Professor in Psychiatry from 1996 to 2009. He received his MA (1964) and PhD (1967) in Clinical Psychology from Columbia University.

Frank has published several books and numerous other scholarly publications examining psychoanalysis, cognitive-behavior therapy, and integrative psychotherapy. In particular, Psychoanalytic participation: Action, interaction, and integration.

He is on the advisory board of the International Association for Relational Psychoanalysis and Psychotherapy, a faculty member of the Steven Mitchell Center for Relational Studies in New York City, and the Senior Consulting Editor of Psychoanalytic Perspectives: An International Journal of Integration and Innovation.

== Representative publications ==
- Frank, K.A. (2009). Ending with options. Psychoanal. Inquiry, 29:136–156.
- Frank, K.A. (2007). Getting Practical in Analysis: A Review of Owen Renik's Practical Psychoanalysis for Therapists and Patients. Psychoanalytic Perspectives, 5:149–158.
- Frank, K. A. (2005). Toward conceptualizing the personal relationship in therapeutic action: Beyond the "real" relationship. Psychoanal. Perspectives, 3(1) 15–56.
- Frank, K. A. (2002). The "ins and outs" of enactment: A relational bridge for psychotherapy integration. J. Psychother. Integration, 12:267–286.
- Frank, K.A. (2001). Commentary: further thoughts about assimilative integration. J. Psychother. Integration, 11, 1, 131–152.
- Frank, K. A. (1999). Psychoanalytic participation: Action, interaction, and integration. Mahwah, NJ: Analytic Press.
- Frank, K.A. (Ed.) (1977). The Human Dimension in Psychoanalytic Practice. New York: Grune & Stratton.
