= Barrington Dunbar =

Barrington Dunbar (1901–1978) was a British Guianese-born American Quaker sociologist, economist, social worker, and activist.

He completed various international and national to social work, including managing a career guidance clinic for the New York Urban League, directed a displaced persons camp in Germany under the United Nations Relief and Rehabilitation Administration, organized refugee recreation in France, and administering a yaws eradication program in Haiti. After joining the Society of Friends circa 1955, he encouraged Quakers to support Black liberation and confront systemic racism outside of their own communities.

== Life ==
Dunbar was born in 1901 to a poor family in British Guiana. He attended primary school there and left to work as a tailor's apprentice due to family necessity.

At 16, he travelled to Harlem, New York, accompanied by his older brother Rudolph, a professional musician. While living in Harlem, he completed high school, then attended tuition-free college in New York while working various jobs to support his education.

He completed his master's degree in sociology at Columbia University. He embarked on doctoral studies at Columbia with a project titled "The Difference in Behavior Patterns of West Indian and Southern Negroes in Harlem". However, "noting the paucity of academic opportunities open to Black scholars", he withdrew from the Ph.D. program to become resident manager of a Greenwich Village co-operative community.

In 1939, he endorsed the American Congress for Peace and Democracy's Call to Action to "use our international influence and economic power to stop Fascist aggression", "keep the United States out of war", and "help keep war out of the world".

In 1967, he attended the Fourth Friends World Committee for Consultation in Greensboro, North Carolina.

During a 1975 socioeconomic study, Dunbar visited various Quaker schools and observed that only African Americans from middle-class families were admitted. Dunbar found that the only exception was Germantown Friends School which accepted working-class Black students.

== Legacy ==
In 1979, the New York Yearly Meeting posthumously published his work and biography in A Quaker Speaks from the Black Experience: The Life and Selected Writings of Barrington Dunbar (1901-1978). It was edited by American writer Carleton Mabee and AFSC treasurer James A. Fletcher.

The New York Yearly Meeting has also established the Barrington Dunbar Fund for Black Development, which "educates Friends on the needs of the Black and Latin American sectors of the community and stimulates Friends' concern and cooperation in responding to the needs of the wider community".
