= Columbia University College of Physicians and Surgeons =

Private medical school in New York, US

Columbia University Roy and Diana Vagelos College of Physicians and Surgeons
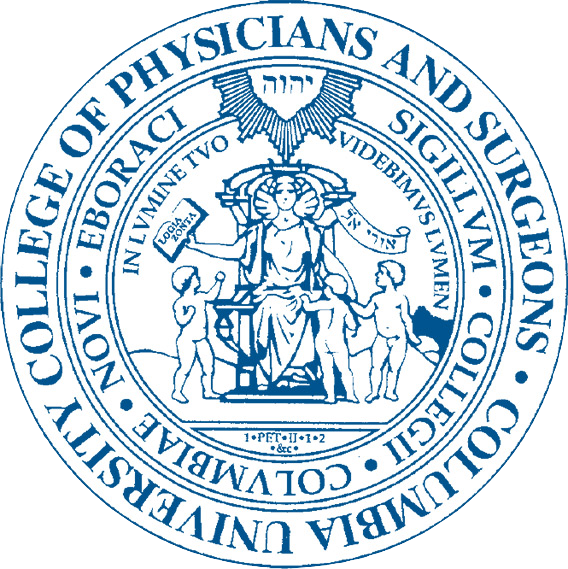
- School seal
- Type: Private medical school
- Established: 1767; 259 years ago
- Parent institution: Columbia University
- Endowment: $1.136 billion
- Dean: James M. McKiernan
- Faculty: 4,300
- Students: Totals: 1,520; 606 M.D. 94 M.D./Ph.D. 776 Ph.D.
- Location: Manhattan, New York, United States; 40.841519°N 73.941139°W
- Campus: Urban
- Website: ps.columbia.edu

The Columbia University College of Physicians and Surgeons (officially known as Columbia University Roy and Diana Vagelos College of Physicians and Surgeons) is the medical school of Columbia University, located at the Columbia University Irving Medical Center in the Washington Heights neighborhood of Manhattan, New York City.

Founded in 1767 by Samuel Bard as the medical department of King's College (now Columbia University), the College of Physicians and Surgeons was the first medical school in the Thirteen Colonies to award the Doctor of Medicine (MD) degree. The College of Physicians and Surgeons turned the white coat ceremony into a full-fledged ceremony in 1993. Following a gift of $250 million from Roy and Diana Vagelos in 2017, the school became the first medical school in the nation to replace loans with scholarships for all students who qualify for financial aid when it did so in 2018.

Columbia is affiliated with NewYork-Presbyterian Hospital. Students additionally rotate through its affiliate hospitals: Harlem Hospital Center; Stamford Hospital in Stamford, CT; and Mary Imogene Bassett Hospital in Cooperstown, New York.

== History ==
=== Colonial years ===
In 1767, Samuel Bard, an alumnus of then-King's College and the University of Edinburgh Medical School, opened a medical school at Columbia. At the time, the medical program at King's College was the first to open in the Province of New York and only the second to be opened in the American Colonies. The school was modelled on the University of Edinburgh Medical School, which at the time was the world leader. Three years later, in 1770, King's College conferred its first medical degree to Robert Tucker, this would prove to be the first Doctor of Medicine (M.D.) awarded in the Thirteen Colonies. Prior to King's College of Medicine offering of the M.D. degree, other American and Canadian medical schools had been offering the Bachelor of Medicine degree. King's College continued to educate young doctors until 1776 when the school was forced to close due to the onset of the Revolutionary War and the occupation of New York by British soldiers. King's College remained closed until 1784 when the school was reopened as Columbia College and in December of that year, the faculty of the medical school were re-instated. In 1791, Bard, now a prominent colonial physician whom George Washington credited with saving his life, was named dean of the medical school.

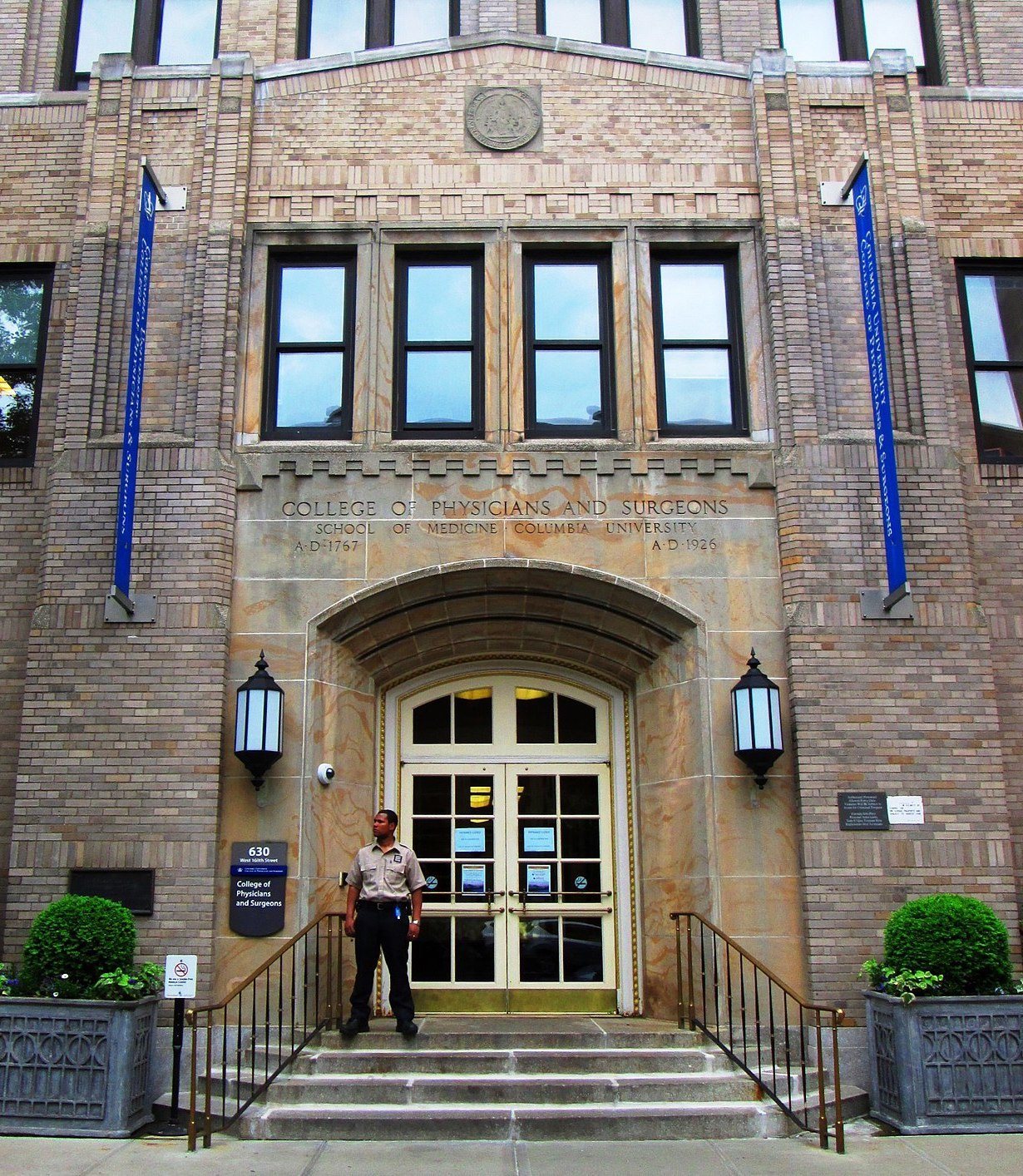
The original entrance to the college

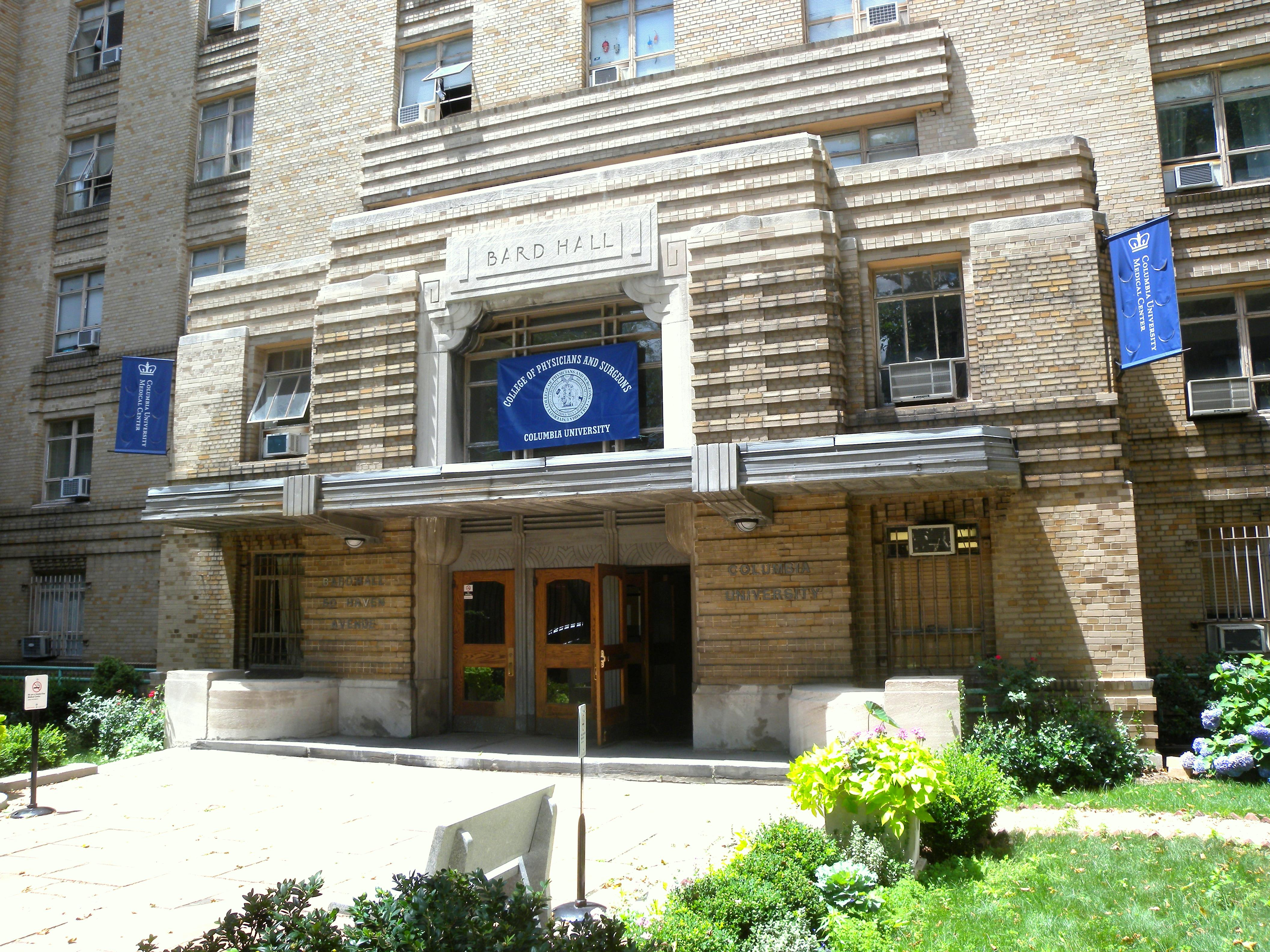
Bard Hall

=== Merger with the College of Physicians and Surgeons ===
In 1807, with a growing young nation in need of adequately trained physicians, the New York State Board of Regents founded, under separate charter, the College of Physicians and Surgeons. Merely four years later, in 1811, Samuel Bard, dean of Columbia University Medical School, became president of the college. The year 1814 then saw the merger of Columbia University Medical School into the College of Physicians and Surgeons, a move that was made in an attempt to reverse what then was perceived as a period of decline for the medical school.

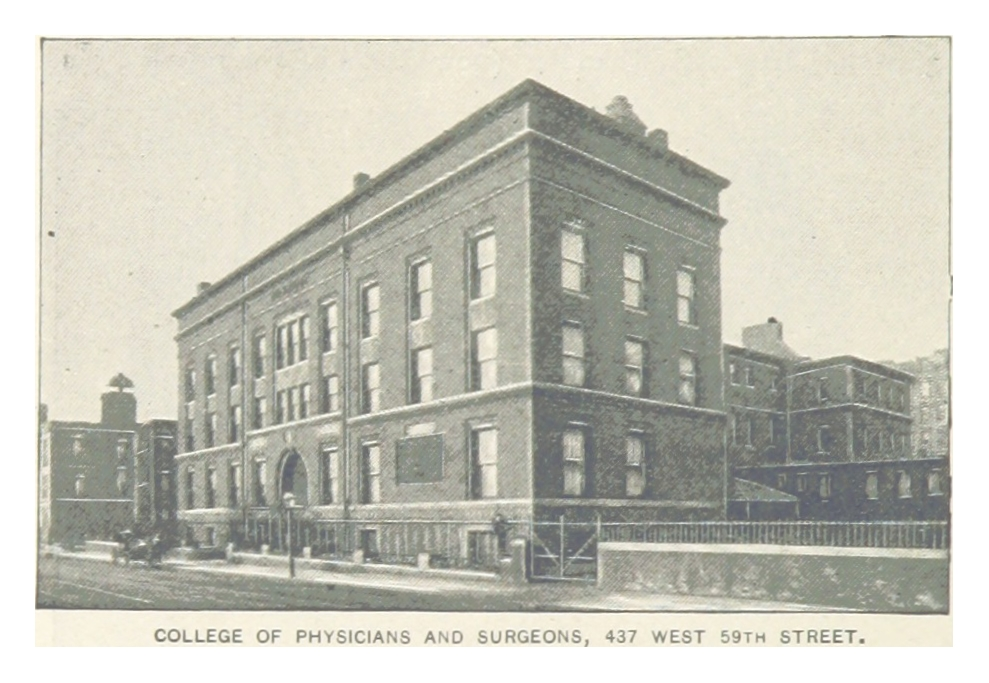
437 West 59th Street in 1893

Despite this merger, the College of Physicians and Surgeons retained its independence from Columbia and it was only in 1860 that the College of Physicians and Surgeons, at that time occupying buildings across West Fifty-ninth Street from the Roosevelt Hospital (its major teaching hospital at the time), after severing its ties to the New York Board of Regents and through agreement between the trustees of the College of Physicians and Surgeons and Columbia, became the official medical school of Columbia University. This new relationship between the college and Columbia was minimal at best, however, with the college retaining independence from Columbia. It was not until 1891 that the College of Physicians and Surgeons would be fully integrated and incorporated into Columbia. In 1886, the Sloane Maternity Hospital, later the Sloane Hospital for Women, was founded as part of Physicians and Surgeons.

=== Medical Center Formation ===
In 1911, Columbia University entered into a "Formal Agreement of Alliance" with Presbyterian Hospital, a hospital founded in 1868 by James Lenox a New York philanthropist. It was this alliance, initiated by philanthropist Edward Harkness, that helped to pave the way for the creation of a new medical center format. In 1928, the Columbia-Presbyterian Medical Center opened its doors in a building largely funded by Harkness. Set on land in the Washington Heights section of Manhattan, Columbia-Presbyterian Medical Center was the first place in the world to provide facilities for patient care, medical education, and research all under one roof. It was the first academic medical center and pioneered the practice of combining medical training with patient care. Included in this project with Presbyterian Hospital were the Babies Hospital, the Neurologic Institute of New York, and the New York State Psychiatric Institute; these were then joined in 1950 by the New York Orthopaedic Hospital.

In 1997, the Presbyterian Hospital merged with New York Hospital (partner of Weill Cornell Medicine of Cornell University) to form the NewYork–Presbyterian Hospital. This new hospital system incorporated many of the satellite hospitals and affiliated programs of these two institutions. While the two medical schools remain independent of one another, there has been significant cross-fertilization between the two campuses, leading to increasing numbers of shared research experiences and training programs. All hospitals in the NewYork-Presbyterian Healthcare System are affiliated with either the Cornell or Columbia medical schools.

=== Renaming ===
At the 2017 Crown Awards, President Lee Bollinger announced that the school would officially be renamed as the Columbia University Roy and Diana Vagelos College of Physicians and Surgeons. This decision was made in response to a gift of $250 million from P. Roy and Diana Vagelos. $150 million of the gift was dedicated to endow a fund to help Columbia eliminate student loans for medical students who qualify for financial aid. The remaining $100 million will be divided equally to support precision medicine programs and basic science research as well as an endowed professorship in the Department of Medicine in honor of the Vagelos family's longtime doctor and friend, Thomas P. Jacobs, MD.

== Academics ==
Beginning in the fall of 2009, the medical school implemented a new curriculum that differed markedly from more traditional structures. The largest change involved a reduction in the number of preclinical months from twenty-four to eighteen and the expansion of the electives and selectives period to fourteen months. Each student now is required to spend four to ten months working on a scholarly project before graduation.

=== Admissions ===
Columbia is a top 20 medical school with a competitive ~1.9% acceptance rate. The program admitted just 140 students from over 7,000 applicants in the most recent cycle. Admitted students have strong academic profiles, with a median GPA of 3.90 and a median MCAT score of 522.

== Campus ==
Situated on land overlooking the Hudson River and separated from Columbia's undergraduate campus in Morningside Heights by approximately fifty blocks and the neighborhood of Harlem, the Columbia University Medical Center has its own unique standing and identity. The campus comprises not only the College of Physicians and Surgeons, but also the College of Dental Medicine (formerly the School of Dental and Oral Surgery), the School of Nursing, the Mailman School of Public Health, the Presbyterian portion of NewYork-Presbyterian Hospital (including the Morgan Stanley Children's Hospital) and the New York State Psychiatric Institute. Affiliated hospitals include Harlem Hospital, Stamford Hospital in Stamford, Connecticut, and Mary Imogene Bassett Hospital in Cooperstown, New York. In August 2016 the Roy and Diana Vagelos Education Center, new 100,000-square-foot, 14-story glass medical education tower opened at 104 Haven Avenue, between 171st and 172nd Streets, near the northern tip of the campus. Housing options on Columbia's Medical Campus include Bard Hall and the Bard-Haven Towers, a complex of three, 31-story apartment buildings overlooking the Hudson River and the George Washington Bridge. Students are guaranteed housing on campus all years, although many students choose to live in other parts of New York City.

== Student life ==
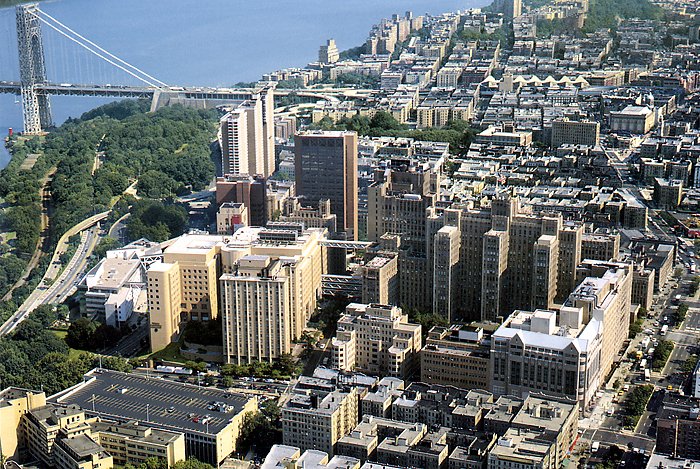
Aerial view of the Columbia University Medical Center

=== P&S Club ===
There are student clubs covering a range of professional and personal interests, all of which fall under the umbrella of the P&S Club. One unusual element is the Bard Hall Players, a theatrical group entirely run by the students of the medical campus, and one of the largest and most active medical school theater groups in the country. They perform a musical and two plays each year. Founded over a century ago by John Mott, the 1946 Nobel Peace Prize recipient, the P&S Club serves to support and provide activities and organizations for the enrichment of the lives of the College of Physicians and Surgeons students. The P&S Club is well known for its humanitarian aims; most notably the 1917 purchase of a steam launch delivered to Sir William Grenfell, a physician living in Labrador. This launch was used to deliver medical services to the Inuit and First Nations fishermen living on the islands of the Labrador coast and frequently, was crewed by P&S students.

== Prominent faculty ==
Prominent faculty members include Nobel Prize laureates Richard Axel, Eric Kandel, and Joachim Frank; author Oliver Sacks; 2011 Pulitzer Prize winner for nonfiction Siddhartha Mukherjee; and Rudolph Leibel whose co-discovery of the hormone leptin, and cloning of the leptin and leptin receptor genes, has had a major role in the area of understanding human obesity. Jean C. Emond, Thomas S. Zimmer Professor of Surgery, participated in the first living-donor liver transplantation in children in North America and established the liver transplant program at Columbia, which has become one of the largest in the United States. Craig R. Smith, Chairman of Surgery, performed a quadruple bypass surgery on former President Bill Clinton in 2004. Joshua Sonett, Professor of Clinical Surgery and Chief of Thoracic Surgery, performed a lung decortication on former President Bill Clinton in 2005.

== Notable alumni ==
=== Medical innovators ===
- Virginia Apgar (Apgar score)
- Glover Crane Arnold (testing cures for malaria and tuberculosis)
- Oswald Avery (pioneer in immunochemistry)
- T. Romeyn Beck (pioneer in medical jurisprudence; authored first significant American book on forensic medicine)
- Alan Berkman (activist, federal prisoner, AIDS advocate, founder of Health GAP)
- H. I. Biegeleisen (pioneer of phlebology; one of the first doctors in United States to use injection as a method of treating varicose veins; coined the term sclerotherapy)
- T. Berry Brazelton (pediatrician, Brazelton Neonatal Behavioral Assessment Scale)
- Rachel Brem (diagnostic radiologist, technologies for diagnosis of breast cancer)
- Leo Buerger (urologist that characterized Buerger disease)
- Charles Drew (ground-breaking work in blood transfusions, blood storage, large-scale blood banks)
- Edgar G. Engleman (cancer immunologist and NIH Cancer Systems Biology Consortium investigator at Stanford University School of Medicine)
- Tom Frieden (Director of U.S. Centers for Disease Control and Prevention (CDC); New York City Health Commissioner)
- Oliver Wolcott Gibbs (chemist; known for performing first electrogravimetric analyses; National Academy of Sciences, President (also a founding member), 1895–1900)
- John Franklin Gray (pioneer in field of and first practitioner of homoeopathy in United States; also recognized as important medical reformer)
- Peter K. Gregersen (Crafoord Prize in Polyarthritis in 2013)
- William Halsted (introduced several new operations, one of "Big Four" founding professors at Johns Hopkins Hospital)
- Karen Hein (founded the first HIV/AIDS program for adolescents in the world)
- Jean Emily Henley (wrote the first widely used anesthesia textbook)
- Robert Lefkowitz (U.S. National Medal of Science, Shaw Prize, 2012 Nobel Prize in Chemistry)
- Emanuel Libman (bacteriologist and pathologist who helped discover Libman–Sacks endocarditis)
- Celia Maxwell (infectious disease physician and academic administrator)
- Sean E. McCance (orthopedic surgeon)
- Walsh McDermott (infectious diseases and public health; pioneered the use of isoniazid to treat tuberculosis)
- David McDowell (psychiatrist, author, consultant)
- Jean Baker Miller (psychoanalyst, feminist, social activist, wrote Toward a New Psychology of Women (1976))
- Dorothy Klenke Nash (first American woman neurosurgeon)
- Frederick F. Russell (Brigadier General; U.S. Army physician who developed the first successful typhoid vaccine in 1909; Public Welfare Medal)
- Benjamin Spock (pediatrician, wrote The Common Sense Book of Baby and Child Care)
- Albert Starr (2007 Lasker Award; cardiovascular surgeon; pioneer, inventor, Starr heart valve)
- P. Roy Vagelos (president, CEO, chairman of pharmaceutical company Merck)
- Allen Whipple (Whipple procedure, Whipple's triad)
- Paul Wender (researcher of the genetic origins of schizophrenia and ADHD and pioneer on the field of ADHD in adults)
- Leona Zacharias (biologist and medical researcher; pioneered research on retrolental fibroplasia)

=== Nobel laureates ===
- Baruch Samuel Blumberg
- Joshua Lederberg
- Robert J. Lefkowitz (best known for his work with G protein-coupled receptors for which he won the 2012 Nobel Prize in Chemistry)
- Dickinson W. Richards
- Harold Varmus (Director, National Institutes of Health; Director, National Cancer Institute; President, Memorial Sloan-Kettering Cancer Center)

=== Writers ===
- Jacob Appel (2004 William Faulkner – William Wisdom Creative Writing Competition)
- Robert Coles (Pulitzer Prize for General Nonfiction, MacArthur Award "genius grant", Presidential Medal of Freedom, National Humanities Medal)
- Robin Cook (100 million+ copies of works in print)
- Jerome Groopman
- Walker Percy (National Book Award for Fiction, "Time 100 Best English-language Novels from 1923 to 2005")
- John E. Sarno (originator of the diagnosis of psychosomatic condition, tension myositis syndrome)

=== Others ===
Other alumni include astronaut Story Musgrave, Olympic champion Jenny Thompson (twelve medals, including eight gold medals), former Afghan prime minister Abdul Zahir, mayor of the City of Rancho Cucamonga, California (2006–) Don Kurth, and philanthropists Theodore K. Lawless and Jean Shafiroff. George Fletcher Chandler served with the US Army Medical Corps and practiced as a physician and surgeon throughout New York in addition to organizing and serving as the first Superintendent of the New York State Police. Charles W. Berry was New York City Comptroller.

Serb politician and accused war criminal Radovan Karadžić studied at Columbia for a year. Former NBA player Mark Pope attended P&S, but left to coach college basketball.

Megumi Yamaguchi Shinoda was the first Asian American woman to graduate from P&S and one of the first women of Japanese ancestry in the United States to receive a Doctor of Medicine degree.

John L. Leal's application of chlorine disinfection technology and his defense of the chemical's use, contributed significantly to the eradication of typhoid fever and other waterborne diseases in the U.S.

Robert Ernest Noble, who received his M.D. in 1899 was a U.S. Army medical officer who researched causes and treatments for yellow fever and malaria during construction of the Panama Canal. After his service in France during World War I, he was the longtime director of the Library of the Surgeon General's Office.

Nelson H. Henry, who graduated in 1879, practiced medicine in New York City, was a member of the New York State Assembly, and served as Adjutant General of New York.

== See also ==
- Columbia University in popular culture
