= Emond =

Surname list

Emond is a surname, and may refer to:

- Alexandre Émond, a Canadian judoka
- Anne Émond, a film director and screenwriter
- Bernard Émond, a Canadian director and screenwriter
- Jean-Bernard Émond, a Canadian politician
- Jean Emond, a professor of surgery
- Linda Emond, an American actress
- Martin Emond, a New Zealand cartoon illustrator and painter
- Renaud Emond, a Belgian football player
