= Karth =

Karth is a surname. Notable people called Karth include:

- Brita Persdotter Karth, fictional person in Swedish history
- Dick Karth (born 1952), American historic motorsport and stock car racing driver
- Dieter Delle Karth (born 1944), Austrian bobsledder
- Joseph Karth (1922–2005), U.S. Representative from Minnesota
- Nico Delle Karth (born 1984), Austrian sailor
- Walter Delle Karth (born 1946), Austrian bobsledder
- Werner Delle Karth, Austrian bobsledder
- Walter Delle Karth Sr. (1911–2004), Austrian skier

== See also ==
- Defossé & Karth, French wallpaper company
- Kurth (disambiguation)
