= Kimberly Anyadike =

Youngest African American woman to fly across the United States

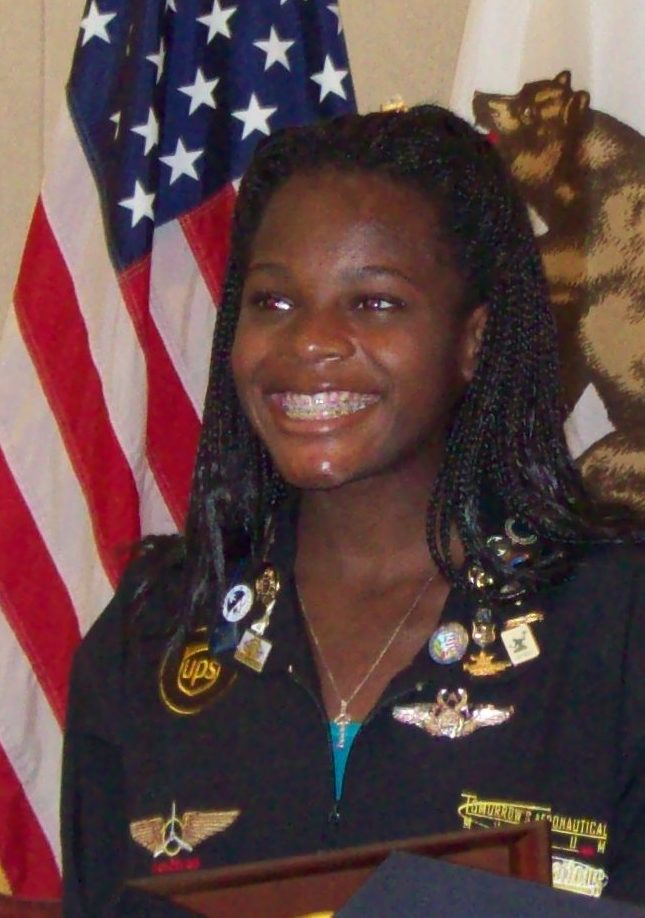
- Anyadike in 2009
- Born: February 1, 1994 (age 32); Compton, California, U.S.
- Education: University of California, Los Angeles
- Known for: Completing a transcontinental flight across the United States.

Kimberly Ndidi Anyadike (born February 1, 1994) is an American pilot from Compton, California. In 2009, at the age of 15, she became the youngest African American woman to complete a transcontinental flight across the United States, from Los Angeles, California to Newport News, Virginia. Anyadike was accompanied by an adult safety pilot, and by a retired Air Force pilot who had served with the WWII Tuskegee Airmen. Her plane was autographed by about 50 Tuskegee airmen as she stopped at different cities across the US, and she completed the round-trip journey in a single-engine Cessna 172 in 13 days.

In 2015, Anyadike received the first Young Aviator's Award from the Tuskegee Airmen in recognition of her achievements. In 2016, she graduated from the University of California, Los Angeles with an undergraduate degree.

== Early life ==
Born in 1994, Anyadike grew up in Compton, California. She has an older brother and sister. Her parents are originally from Nigeria, and their surname Anyadike means "eye of the warrior" in the Igbo language.

Anyadike took dance lessons at the Lula Washington Dance Academy, served as a junior lifeguard at Venice Beach for five years, and volunteered as a youth leader at her local church. At a young age, she showed a strong interest in medical science and anatomy; her mother taught her to identify and name all 206 bones in the body. Anyadike later attended science classes at the Charles Drew University Saturday Science Academy, an L.A.-based STEM subjects program for youth ranging in age from preschool to grade 12.

== Aviation training ==
Anyadike took her first flying lessons at the age of 12, attending an after-school aviation program offered by Tomorrow's Aeronautical Museum for disadvantaged youths. She was inspired to take lessons after reading about Jonathan Strickland, an earlier participant of the program who became the youngest person to fly a fixed-wing aircraft and a helicopter solo in a single day. Anyadike paid for her flight lessons with "museum dollars" earned by washing airplanes and working odd jobs around the Compton Airport. As part of the program's requirements, she maintained a strong academic record throughout the period.

Despite having a fear of heights, Anyadike says that being in the cockpit of a plane is "an amazing experience".

== Transcontinental flight ==
As Anyadike gradually built up 100 hours of flight time, she conceived the idea of flying across the country. She wanted to inspire other youth, while also honouring the Tuskegee Airmen, an African-American air combat unit that served during World War II. Departing on June 29, 2009, 15-year-old Anyadike flew a single-engine Cessna 172 from Compton, California to Newport News, Virginia and back, completing the journey in 13 days. She was accompanied by adult safety pilot Ronnell Norman, and Major Levi H. Thornhill, an 87-year-old retired U.S. Air Force pilot who had served as a member of the Tuskegee Airmen.

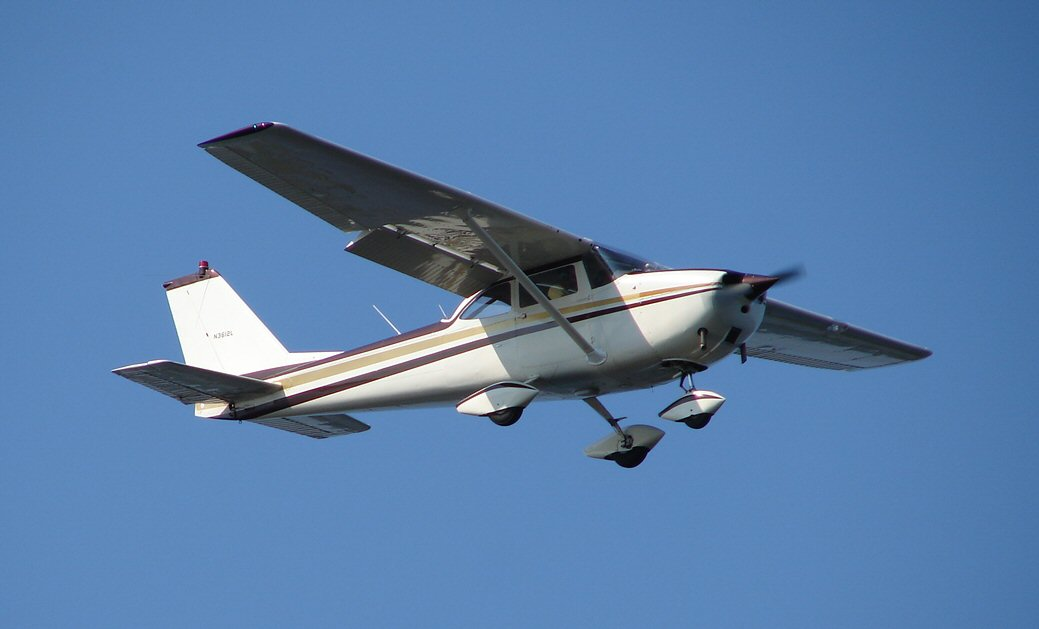
A Cessna 172 aircraft

Anyadike made at least a dozen scheduled stops along the way, and navigated through thunderstorms as she flew across Texas. In Washington, D.C., Congresswoman Laura Richardson came to congratulate the young pilot, and in Tuskegee, Alabama, Mayor Omar Neal proclaimed July 2 to be "Kimberly Anyadike Day". During stops in different cities, Anyadike's plane was autographed by about 50 different Tuskegee Airmen. Major Thornhill acted as Anyadike's representative to make the necessary introductions with regional chapters of the airmen. Although the record had never been officially tracked before her journey, Anyadike is considered the youngest black American woman — and possibly the youngest person of any race or gender — to have successfully piloted a plane coast-to-coast across the United States.

Upon her arrival home on July 11, 2009, Anyadike received an award from the County of Los Angeles, and was personally invited by Governor Arnold Schwarzenegger to visit the California State Capitol. In May 2015, Anyadike received the Tuskegee Airmen's inaugural Young Aviator's Award in Tuskegee, Alabama, in recognition of her achievements as a pilot. In 2017, Anyadike was interviewed about her transcontinental flight for a special Disney Channel segment for Black History Month entitled 'True Heroes Are Timeless'.

== College education ==
For her college education, Anyadike enrolled at the University of California, Los Angeles (UCLA), majoring in physiological science with minors in African-American studies and Spanish. During her senior year, she was also working as a registered emergency medical technician, and was volunteering for her local chapter of the Flying Samaritans to bring medical care to Tijuana, Mexico. She graduated with her undergraduate degree from UCLA in June 2016. When asked about future aspirations, Anyadike has said that she plans to enroll in medical school and become a cardiovascular surgeon.

== Family ==
Anyadike's older sister, Kelly, also took aviation lessons at Tomorrow's Aeronautical Museum. In 2008, on her sixteenth birthday, Kelly became the youngest African-American woman to pilot four different fixed-wing aircraft in a single day. In interviews, Anyadike has said that a friendly rivalry with Kelly helped inspire her to complete her own piloting achievements.
