= George Gibbs (mineralogist) =

American mineral collector (1776 – 1833)

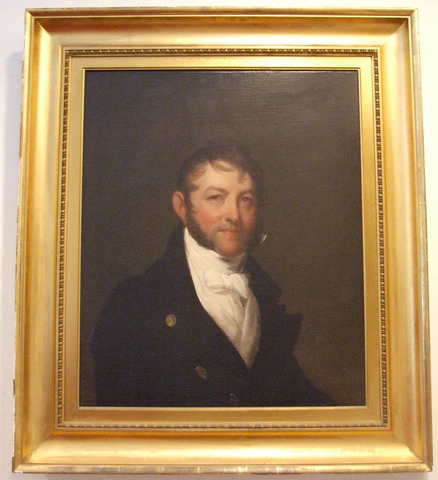
- Born: January 7, 1776; Newport, Colony of Rhode Island, British America
- Died: August 6, 1833 (aged 57); Ravenswood, New York, U.S.
- Occupation: Mineralogist
- Spouse: Laura Wolcott (after 1810)
- Children: 7, including George, Oliver and Alfred
- Parent(s): George Gibbs; Mary Channing Gibbs

George Gibbs (January 7, 1776 – August 6, 1833) was an American mineralogist and mineral collector. The mineral gibbsite is named after him.

== Early life ==
George Gibbs was born in Newport, Rhode Island, the son of wealthy merchant George Gibbs and Mary (née Channing) Gibbs.

== Career ==
In 1796, Gibbs was sent by his father to study the mercantile business in Canton, China. During his travels, Gibbs studied in Europe and went to Lausanne and Paris. In Paris, he studied mineralogy with Heinrich von Struve. Gibbs was fascinated by minerals and became friends with prominent leading European mineralogists: Francois Gillet de Laumont, Jean-François d'Aubuisson de Voisins, and Jacques Louis, Comte de Bournon.

He spent several years as a young man traveling abroad, and devoted much of his time and wealth to the collection of minerals. On his return to Rhode Island, he brought with him the most extensive and valuable collection ever seen in the United States up to that time. It consisted of the collection of Jean Gigot d'Orcy (1733–1793), containing 4,000 specimens, and that of Gregoire de Razumowsky, containing 6,000 specimens. These, with the results of his own gathering, formed a cabinet of more than 20,000 minerals. The collection was first exhibited in Newport.

In 1805, Gibbs' collection grew too large and he stored it in a house near his Newport mansion. The same year, the Governor of Rhode Island appointed Gibbs as "Aide de Camp" and given the title of Colonel. In 1807, Gibbs became friends with Yale University Professor Benjamin Silliman and together they put an exhibit of Gibbs collection at Yale in 1811. He was elected a Fellow of the American Academy of Arts and Sciences in 1813. In 1825, Gibbs sold his entire twenty-thousand specimen collection for $20,000 to Yale. The funds were raised through the influence of Silliman. Gibbs continued his interest in mineralogy, making extensive journeys and developing new mineral localities.

In 1822 he was elected vice-president of the New York Lyceum of Natural History, He published articles both in the American Mineralogical Journal and the American Journal of Science.

Gibbs may have been responsible for the first path to the summit of Mount Washington, New Hampshire, predating the path created by Abel Crawford and his son, Ethan. This was probably commissioned by Gibbs in 1809 on the eastern slopes but is now lost.

== Personal life ==
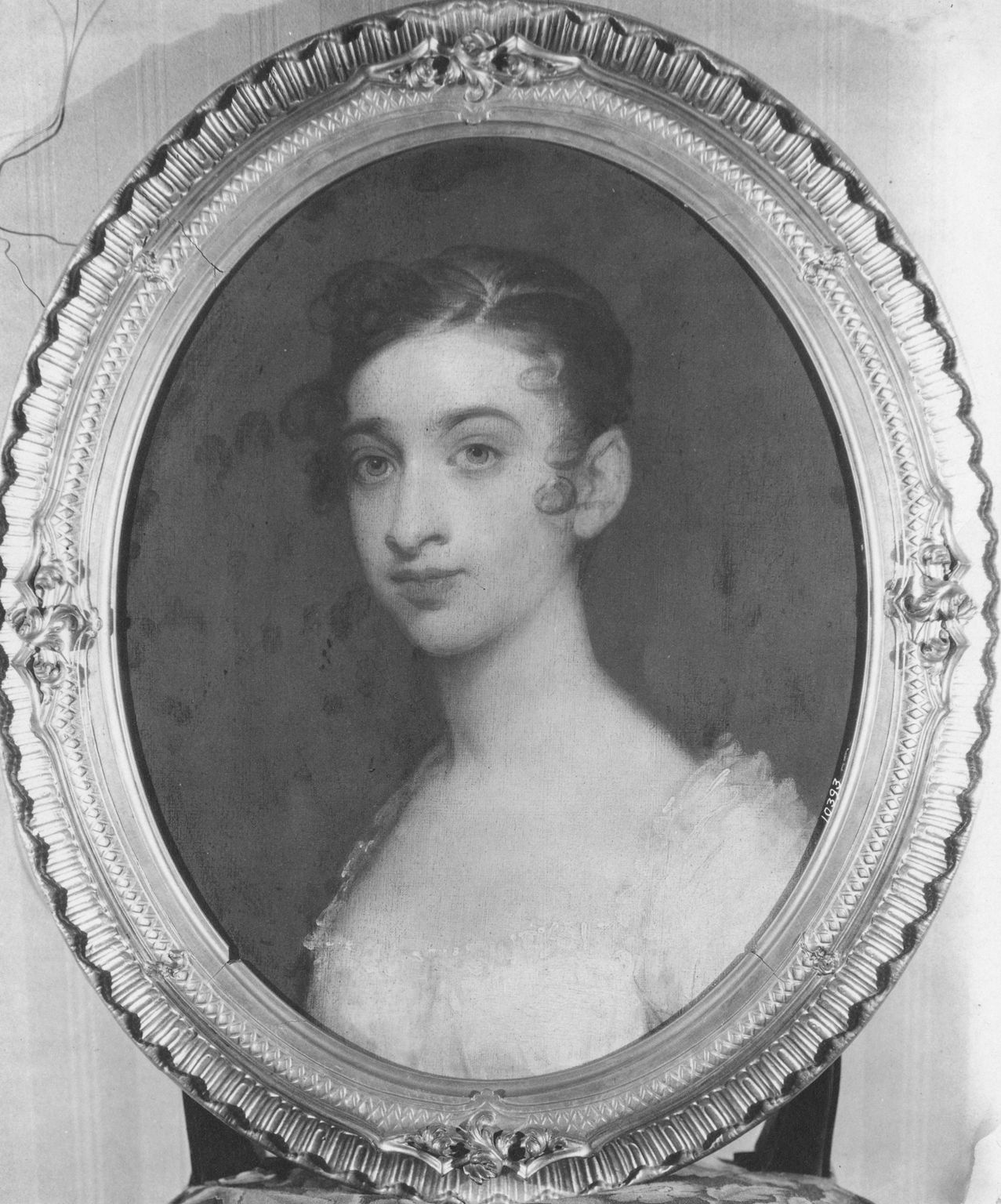
Laura Wolcott Gibbs, portrait by Gilbert Stuart

He married Laura Wolcott on December 27, 1810. She was the daughter of Oliver Wolcott Jr. and a student at Sarah Pierce's Litchfield Female Academy. They had four sons and three daughters including George, Oliver Wolcott (who became a notable professor of chemistry at Harvard University), and Alfred. Gibbs died on August 6, 1833, at Sunswick, Long Island.
