= Sonnet (disambiguation) =

The sonnet is a European form of lyric poetry.

Sonnet or Sonett may also refer to:

== Surname ==
- Joshua Sonett, a Columbia University surgeon
- Ewa Sonnet (born 1985), a Polish model

== Brands ==
- Saab Sonett, a series of automobiles from Saab
- Sonnet (KDE), a computer program
- Parker Sonnet, range of fountain, rollerball, and ballpoint pens made by Parker Pen Company
- Sonnet Insurance, a Canadian online insurer

== Music ==
- Sonnet, an art song genre
- Sonnet, a song for soprano by Massenet
- Sonnet, an art song composition by Raymond Yiu (b.1973)
- Sonnet, a song composition by Bizet
- Sonnet, a composition for organ by Philip Wilby (b.1949)
- Sonnet (The Verve song), by English band The Verve

== Painting ==
- The Sonnet, 1839 painting by William Mulready
- The sonnet (Lambert), a 1907 work by George Washington Lambert

== Artificial intelligence ==
- Claude Sonnet, a large language model in the Claude series by Anthropic

== See also ==
- Saab Sonett, a 1970s car
- Sonet (disambiguation)
- Sonata musical form
