= Don Kurth =

Donald J. Kurth, Jr.
- Born: April 26, 1949 (age 77)
- Occupation: Former mayor of City of Rancho Cucamonga, California

Donald J. Kurth, Jr. (April 26, 1949 - October 4, 2023) was a physician, businessowner, educator, and former mayor of the City of Rancho Cucamonga, California (2006–2011). He was elected President of the Rancho Cucamonga Chamber of Commerce in 1994, Director of the Cucamonga County Water District in 1996, appointed to the Rancho Cucamonga City Council in 2002, and elected mayor of Rancho Cucamonga on November 7, 2006.

== Early life ==
Donald James Kurth, Jr. was born in Newport, Rhode Island where his father, also named Donald James Kurth, was stationed in the United States Navy. Kurth's father and mother, Isabelle, both served in the hospital corps in the Navy throughout World War II. His mother taught Navy carrier pilots how to use oxygen masks for high altitude missions. His father served on the heavy cruiser, the USS New Orleans, in battles including Pearl Harbor, Coral Sea, Midway, Eastern Solomons and Tassafaronga. During the night Battle of Tassafaronga in November 1942, the New Orleans engaged the “Tokyo Express” troop convoy which was supplying troops and supplies to block the United States Marine invasion of Gaudalcanal.

During the battle, the New Orleans was hit and cut nearly in half by an enemy submarine torpedo, losing her bow and two hundred seamen. The ship travelled backwards to port in Sydney, Australia and was later repaired and returned to action. Following the war, Kurth's father was stationed first in Newport Rhode Island and subsequently transferred to the Brooklyn Naval Yard when Kurth was less than a year old and the family bought a home in northern New Jersey, where Kurth was raised.

== Education ==
Kurth graduated from Westwood High School in 1967. He later completed his undergraduate studies at Columbia University (BA), graduating cum laude and Phi Beta Kappa in 1975 before attending medical school at the Columbia University College of Physicians and Surgeons, from which he graduated in 1979 (MD). Following a fellowship in orthopedic surgery at Oxford University, he returned to the United States to complete his medical education. After completing his internship at Johns Hopkins University, he trained at the UCLA Hospital Medical Center and later became Board Certified first in Emergency Medicine and then in Addiction Medicine.

Dr. Kurth subsequently received his Master of Business Administration (MBA) from the Loma Linda University School of Public Health and his Masters in Public Administration (MPA) from the Harvard Kennedy School at Harvard University.

== Career ==
Kurth has been a writer and advocate regarding matters of healthcare public policy, particularly in the area of substance dependence and abuse. In 1999, he founded California Legislative Day for the California Society of Addiction Medicine (CSAM), and in 2003 the National Legislative Day for the American Society of Addiction Medicine (ASAM). He and his colleagues were instrumental in the repeal of the Uniform Policy Provision Law (UPPL) in California and passage of the bipartisan Mental Health Parity and Addiction Equity Act of 2008. In 2003, Dr. Kurth received the prestigious Robert Wood Johnson Foundation Fellowship for Developing Leadership in Reducing Substance Abuse.

== Professional activities ==
He served as president of the California Society of Addiction Medicine from 2002 to 2004, and was elected President Elect of the American Society of Addiction Medicine in 2008. In 2002 Dr. Kurth's peers awarded him the title of Fellow of the American Society of Addiction Medicine, an honor given to less than 300 physicians worldwide.

Kurth also served as the California State Healthcare Coalition Chairperson for Presidential Candidate John McCain in 2008. In this capacity, he served as a speaker on national healthcare issues in the state of California.

Kurth currently serves on the faculty of Loma Linda University School of Medicine as an assistant professor with appointments in both Preventive Medicine and Psychiatry. In addition, he holds a faculty appointment in the Department of Health Policy and Management at the Loma Linda University School of Public Health.

Kurth owns the Urgent Care Center and Alta Loma Medical Group in Rancho Cucamonga, California. He is founder of the Children's Free Immunization Clinic, which has provided free immunizations to many thousands of local children since 1983. He has also served as a medical volunteer with the Flying Samaritans, a group of physicians and other volunteers who use private airplanes to bring free medical care to underserved children in inaccessible regions of rural Mexico.

Kurth is married to Dee Matreyek, Ph.D., who is the founder and president of the Restorative Justice Center of the Inland Empire.
