= EQCM =

EQCM may refer to:

- Electrochemical QCM, a type of quartz crystal microbalance
- Master chief equipmentman, a type of equipment operator
