= Electrogravimetry =

Method of chemical analysis

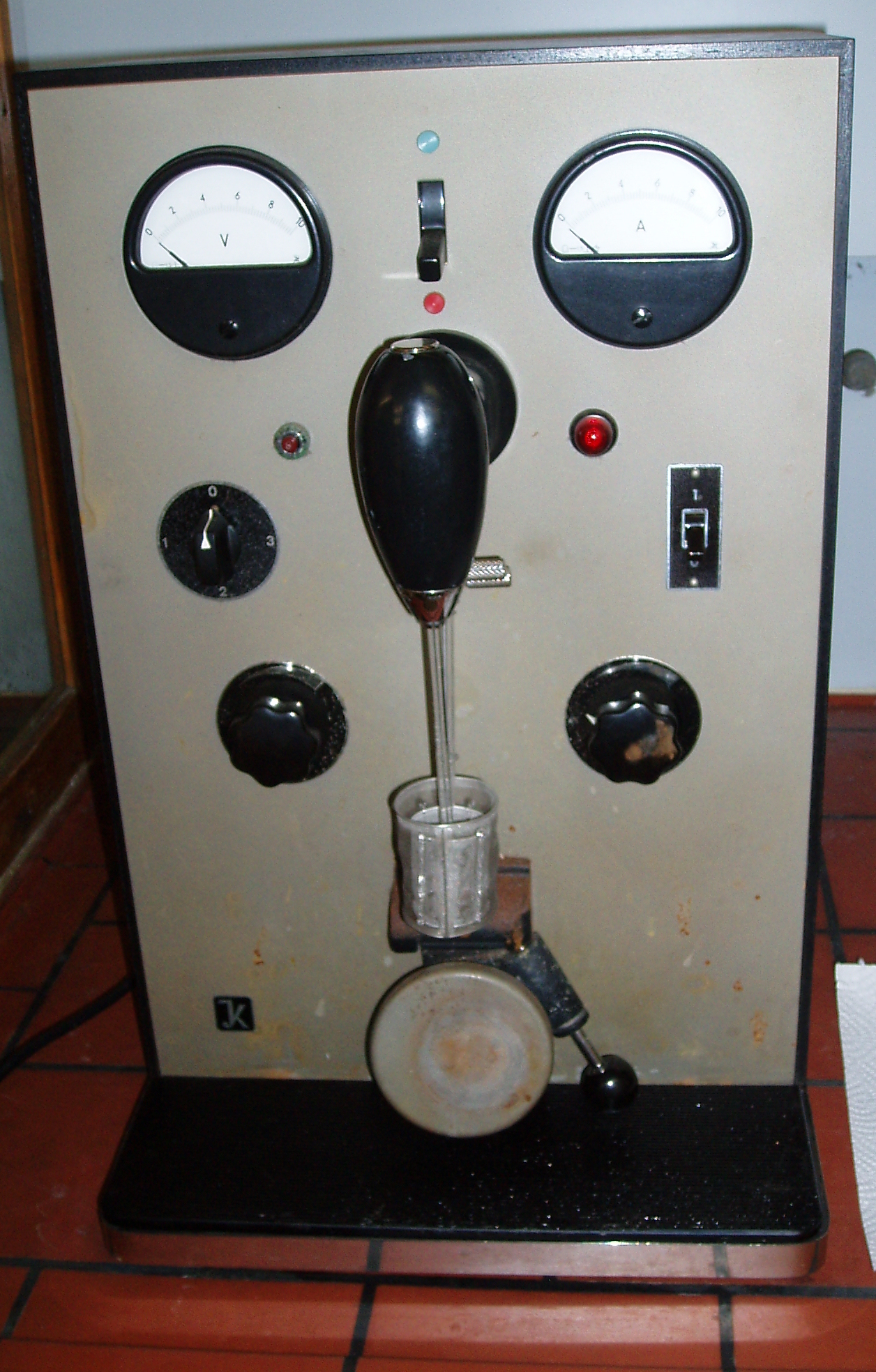
Electrogravimetry apparatus

Electrogravimetry is a method used to separate and quantify ions of a substance, usually a metal. In this process, the analyte solution is electrolyzed. Electrochemical reduction causes the analyte to be deposited on the cathode. The mass of the cathode is determined before and after the experiment, and the difference is used to calculate the mass of analyte in the original solution. Controlling the potential of the electrode is important to ensure that only the metal being analyzed will be deposited on the electrode.

The process is similar to electroplating.

The phenomenon of polarization exerts a back EMF in electrolysis, which reduces the actual EMF of the cell. Thus electrolysis of an electrolyte is possible only when this back EMF is overcome. If two separated platinum electrodes are placed in a dilute solution of copper sulfate and if a source of potential is applied, no appreciable current will flow through the system, until some minimum potential is applied after which the current will increase as the applied potential increases. The applied voltage which is just sufficient to overcome the back EMF due to polarization and also to bring about the electrolysis of an electrolyte without any hindrance is known as decomposition potential.

The decomposition potential Ed is composed of various potentials and is given by:

Ea (min)= Ed= Eb+ Es+ Ev

where:

- Ea = applied potential
- Ed = decomposition potential
- Eb = theoretical counter or back potential
- Ev = overvoltage.

The origins of electrogravimetry date back to the 19th century, when Oliver Wilcott Gibbs, an American chemist, studied the electrolytic precipitation of copper and nickel. This procedure was the first of its kind until Carl Luckow did similar research on electric metal analysis. Today, these two are credited with the invention of the electrogravimetry, known at the time as “electrochemical analysis,” “electroanalysis,” or “electrolytic analysis”.

All methods of electrogravimetry involve a traditional quartz crystal microbalance (QCM) system in which a sensor is used from an AT cut quartz crystal. The groundwork of the QCM is built upon the notion that any mass delivered on the quartz electrode's interfacial region can be detected through the resonating frequency of the vibrating quartz crystal. While most vibrational modes occurring in the AT cut quartz are negligible, the vibration mode is known as thickness shear mode. These vibrations are extremely sensitive, which permits accurate detection of atomic interactions near the sensor, allowing these techniques to be used in analytical chemistry.

Through combining the techniques of QCM with classic electrochemical techniques, the electrochemical quartz crystal microbalance (EQCM) was created. EQCM is a new device used to perform the process of electrogravimetry. This device employs a high frequency acoustic wave generated by a piezoelectric resonator to store and dissipate energy infused into the device's interfacial region.

Electrogravimetry has been useful in polymer studies, copper electrodeposition, gold oxidation in an acidic medium, and passivity of iron in a sulfuric medium, as well as ionic insertion in WO_{3}.
