= Kurth =

Kurth may refer to:

== People ==
- Charles J. Kurth (1862-1896), American lawyer and politician
- Don Kurth (b. 1949), American politician
- Ernst Kurth (1886-1946), Swiss music theorist
- Godefroid Kurth (1847-1916), Belgian historian
- James Kurth (b. ? ), Claude Smith Professor of Political Science at Swarthmore College, United States
- Jean-Pierre Kurth, Swiss para-alpine skier
- Joe Kurth (1914 - ? ), American football player
- Markus Kurth (footballer) (b. 1973), German footballer (soccer player)
- Markus Kurth (politician) (b. 1966), German politician
- Monica Kurth, American politician
- Patsy Ann Kurth (1941–2011), American politician from Florida
- Peter Kurth (born 1957), German actor
- Peter Kurth (born 1960), German politician
- Rob Kurth (b. ? ), American punk rock drummer in the band Face to Face (punk band)
- Ronald J. Kurth (b. ? ), United States Navy admiral
- Wally Kurth (b. 1958), American singer and television performer

== Companies ==
- Andrews Kurth, Houston, Texas-based law firm
- Kurth Brewery, located in Columbus, Wisconsin and operated from 1859 to 1949

== Places ==
- Kurth, Wisconsin, United States, ghost town
