= Oliver Wolcott Gibbs =

American chemist (1822–1908)

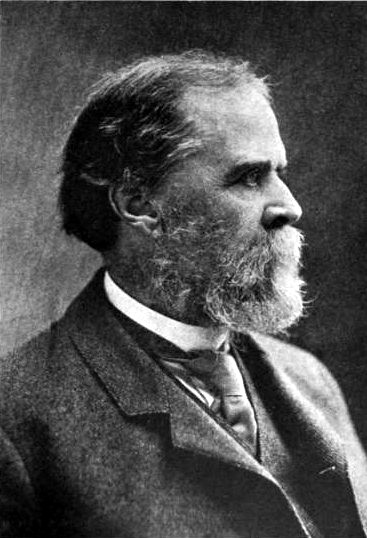
- Born: February 21, 1822; New York City, New York, USA
- Died: December 9, 1908 (aged 86)
- Education: Columbia College (BA, MD)
- Spouse: Josephine Mauran
- Scientific career
- Fields: Chemistry

Oliver Wolcott Gibbs (February 21, 1822 – December 9, 1908) was an American chemist. He is known for performing the first electrogravimetric analyses, namely the reductions of copper and nickel ions to their respective metals.

== Biography ==
Oliver Wolcott Gibbs was born in New York City in 1822 to George and Laura Gibbs. His father, Colonel George Gibbs, was an ardent mineralogist; the mineral gibbsite was named after him, and his collection was finally bought by Yale College. Oliver was the younger brother of George Gibbs and older brother to Alfred Gibbs, who became a Union Army Brigadier General during the American Civil War. Alfred Gibbs son, John Blair Gibbs, was the Acting Assistant Surgeon killed in the Battle of Guantánamo Bay during the Spanish–American War. His mother was a granddaughter of Founding Father Oliver Wolcott, who served as Governor of Connecticut and was a signer of the United States Declaration of Independence.

Entering Columbia College (now Columbia University) in 1837, Wolcott (he dropped the name "Oliver" at an early date) graduated in 1841. At Columbia, Oliver Wolcott Gibbs was a member of the Philolexian Society. Having assisted Robert Hare at University of Pennsylvania for several months, he next entered the Columbia University College of Physicians and Surgeons, qualifying as a doctor of medicine in 1845.

Leaving the United States, Gibbs studied in Germany, considered a center of science, with Karl Friedrich August Rammelsberg, Heinrich Rose, and Justus von Liebig, and in Paris with Auguste Laurent, Jean-Baptiste Dumas, and Henri Victor Regnault.

He returned to the US in 1848 and that year became professor of chemistry at the Free Academy, now the City College of New York. Gibbs was a candidate for Professor of Physical Science at Columbia in 1854, but his application was rejected because he was a Unitarian. That same year, he was elected as a member of the American Philosophical Society.

Gibbs became the Rumford professor at Harvard University in 1863, a post he held until his retirement in 1887 as professor emeritus. After retirement, he moved to Newport, Rhode Island, where he worked for about a decade in his own private laboratory.

Gibbs's research was mainly in analytical and inorganic chemistry, especially the cobalt-amines, platinum metals, and complex acids. He published a number of articles related to spectroscopy and the measurement of wavelengths. Gibbs was said to have been an excellent teacher, who also published many articles in scientific journals.

Gibbs was also the founder of The Union League Club in New York City. In 1862 he proposed to fellow Sanitary Commission Executive Committee member Frederick Law Olmsted that a patriotic club be formed in New York City and in January 1863 formally proposed the same to leading men in New York City, resulting in the formation of The Union League Club in February 1863.

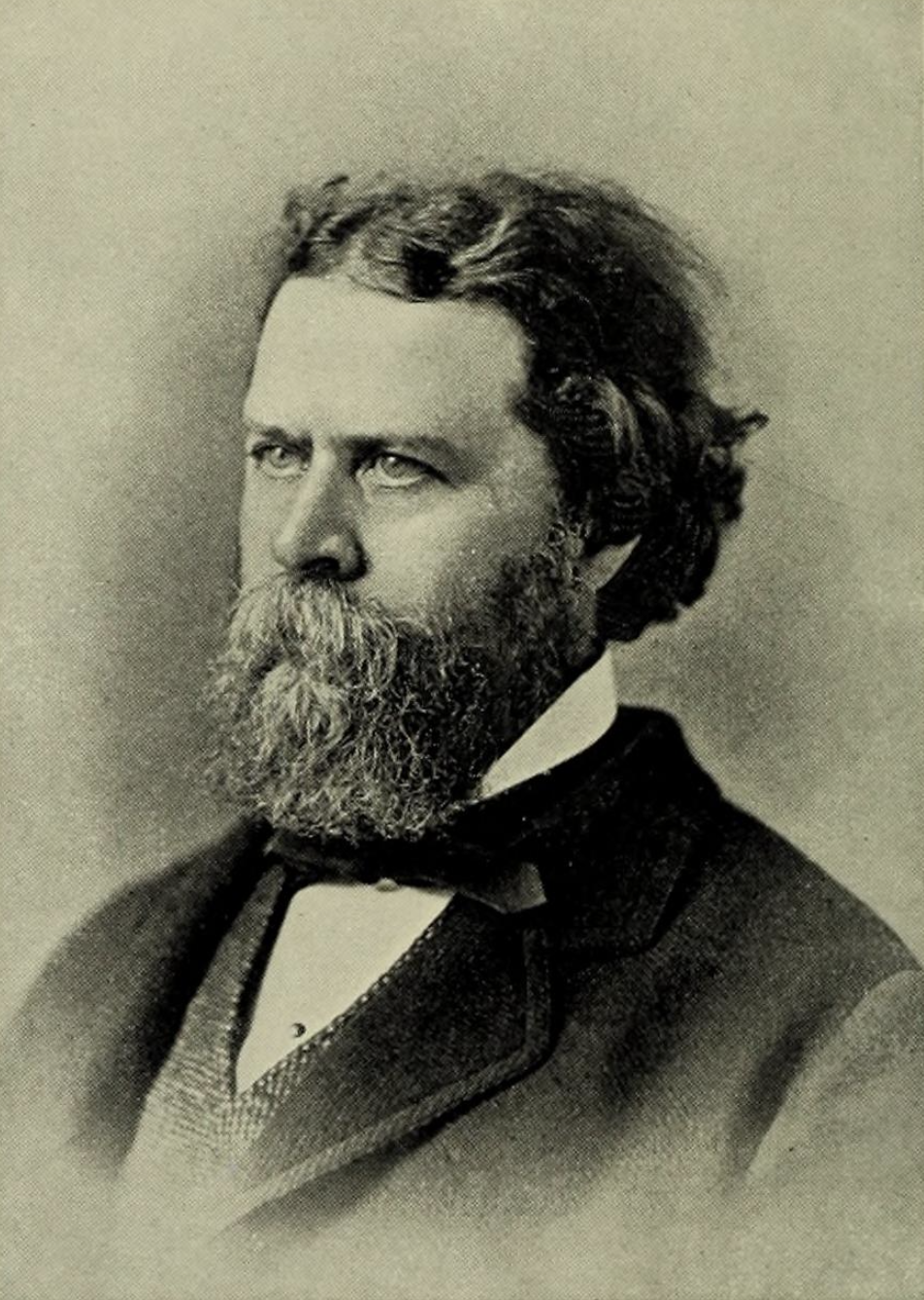
Oliver Wolcott Gibbs

== Commemorations ==
- National Academy of Sciences, President (also a founding member), 1895-1900.
- American Association for the Advancement of Science, President, 1897.
- Gibbs has been honored by the naming of features in and near Yosemite National Park. Mt. Gibbs stands 3,893 metres (12,773 ft) above sea level. Gibbs Lake is located at 2,905 m (9,530 ft) above sea level in the canyon northeast of the peak. Gibbs Lake is formed by Gibbs Creek, originating in the upper reaches of Gibbs Canyon, and drains into Lee Vining Canyon.
- Gibbs is one of the few scientists recognized in the United States Capitol in Washington DC. A small statue of him is on the Amateis bronze doors.
- The Wolcott Gibbs Memorial Laboratory, a chemistry research building, was constructed by Harvard University on its campus in 1911-1913 (demolished 2001-2002). This four-story free-standing building had a footprint of 71 feet by 41 feet. Prof. William Lipscomb did much of his Nobel prizewinning research on boron chemistry in Gibbs Lab, continuing work started at the University of Minnesota.
