= Jean Emily Henley =

Anesthesiologist

Jean Emily Henley from (December 3, 1910 in Chicago, Illinois – August 19, 1994 in Shelburne Vermont) was an anesthesiologist. She was the only child of Eugene Henry and Helen Esther Heller (maiden name: Gutman), who emigrated from Hungary and Germany respectively into the United States. She was fluent in German, due to that being her parents native language. The father changed the family surname to Henley while she was still a child. Both parents practiced lay psychotherapy and later obtained PhDs. As both a sculptor and linguist, she had many accomplishments.

== Career ==
After graduation from high school, she began school at Vassar College in 1929, but left to take a three-year hiatus in March 1930 to study sculpture in Paris, France. She then received her bachelor's degree from Barnard College in 1936. In New York she studied medicine starting in 1936 and graduated in 1940 at Columbia University College of Physicians & Surgeons. She started a residency in internal medicine in San Francisco, then at New York Hospital and completed her training after two years at Peter Bent Brigham Hospital. In 1944 she voluntarily joined the army as a ward officer during her 26 month station between the U.S. and Korea. On March 1, 1947, she began her residency at Columbia-Presbyterian Medical Center, before even graduating in March 1949 she was invited to become the Chief of Anesthesia. However, instead of becoming a faculty member at Columbia, she travelled to Switzerland and took up an invitation from Maria Daelen to come to Wiesbaden. Initially she wanted to visit Germany just for a few days (her visa was valid for ten days), but eventually she stayed there for two years. She was a visiting physician in Gießen, Frankfurt, Marburg, Wiesbaden, Tübingen, Berlin, Heidenheim, Hamburg and Heidelberg. She used anesthesia machines from the US Army and developed her own machine.

She is less known in her home country than in Germany. In 1950 she wrote the first anesthesia textbook published after World War II in Germany: Einführung in die Praxis der modernen Inhalationsnarkose. It had thirteen editions until 1991 with a circulation of more than 15,000. She introduced practices that are still in use today: For example, she included on the back of the anesthesia chart an extensive and detailed check-list for both preoperative assessment and postoperative complications.

Upon her return to the United States in 1951 she became chair and associate professor at the Francis Delafield Hospital in New York until her retirement 1972. While there she specialized in cervical epidurals, even writing papers on her use of total autonomic blockade.

Invited in 1980 by Dr. Rudolf Frey, a lead anesthesiologist at the time, she spoke at the Seventh World Congress of Anesthesiologists.

On September 18, 1981 she became an honorary member of the German Society of Anesthesiology and Intensive care Medicine (Deutsche Gesellschaft für Anästhesiologie und Intensivmedizin, DGAI).

== Bibliography ==
- Zeitlin, Gerald L.; Goerig, Michael (2002). "Dr. Jean Henley, author of the first modern German textbook of anaesthesia". International Congress Series. 1242 (December 2002). Elsevier B.V.: 277–281(5). doi:10.1016/S0531-5131(02)00761-6.
- Zeitlin, Gerald L.; Goerig, Michael (August 2003). "An American Contribution to German Anesthesia". Anesthesiology. 99 (2). Lippincott Williams & Wilkins: 496–502. doi:10.1097/00000542-200308000-00034. ISSN 0003-3022. PMID 12883425. S2CID 39304942.
