= Sonet =

Sonet may refer to:

- Airsport Sonet, a Czech ultralight aircraft
- Sonet Records, European record label
- Sonet Film, production company
- 3821 Sonet, asteroid
- Synchronous optical networking (SONET)
- Kia Sonet, a subcompact crossover car model

== See also ==
- Saab Sonett, a 1970s car
- So-net, Japanese internet service provider majority owned by Sony
- Sonnet (disambiguation)
