= Marie-Dominique-Joseph Engramelle =

French monk, musician, and inventor

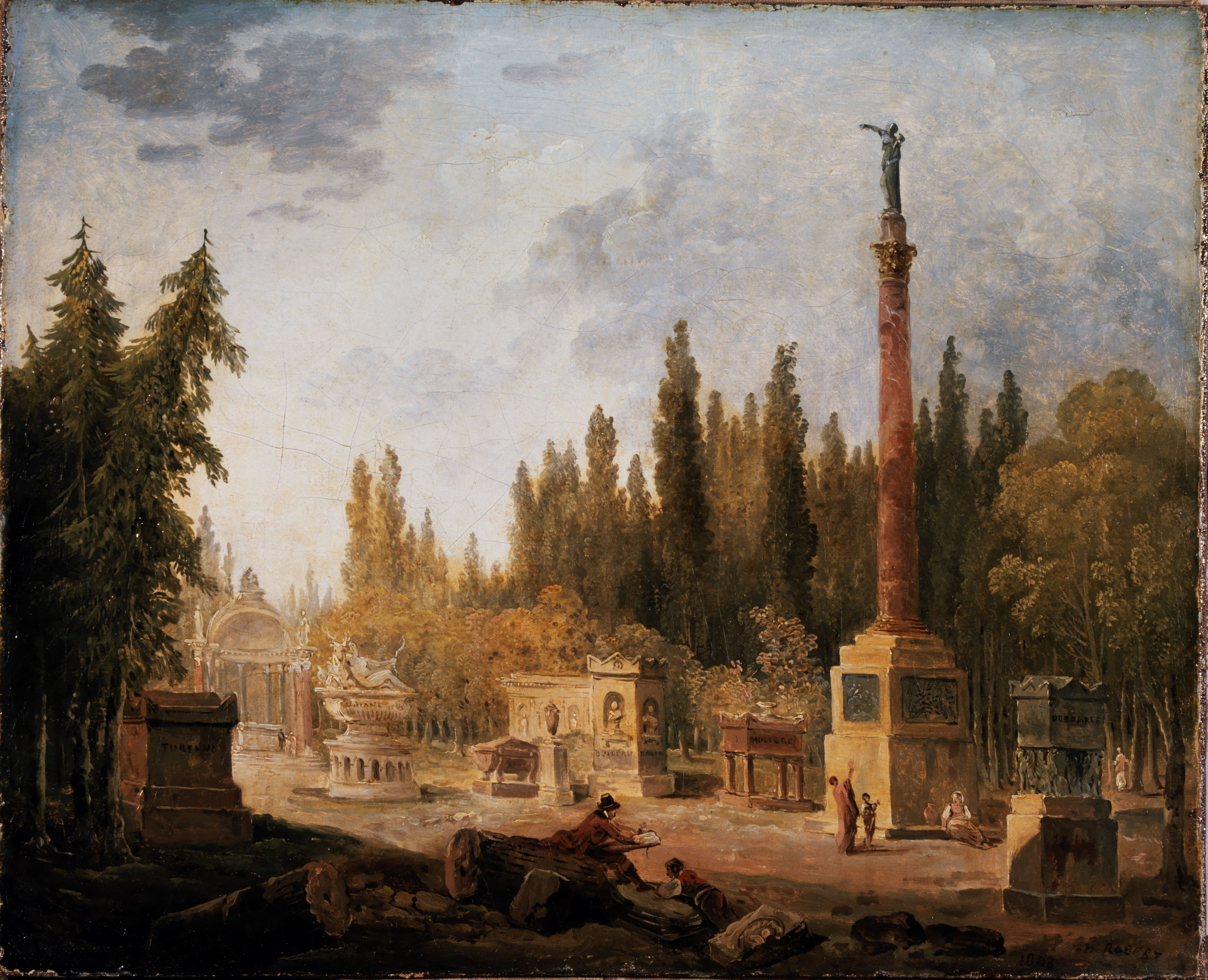
Le Jardin du ancien couvent des Petits-Augustins

Father Marie-Dominique-Joseph Engramelle (March 24, 1727, in Nédonchel – February 9, 1805, in Fontainbleau) was a French religious prosecutor of the convent of Petits-Augustins de Paris, surveyor and topographer, passionate about music and mechanics and inventor of a musical recording process.

He published his treatise in 1775 La Tonotechnie ou l'Art de noter les cylindres, et tout ce qui est susceptible de notage dans les instruments de concerts méchaniques sur la façon de noter le picotage des rouleaux d'orgues mécaniques in English Tonotechnie or the Art of notating cylinders, and everything that is capable of noting in mechanical concert instruments on how to note the pecking of mechanical organ rolls. He argued that automated music would give listeners direct contact with the composer's intentions.

His brother Jacques-Louis-Florentin Engramelle (1734–1814), also an Augustinian monk in Paris, was a renowned entomologist who, who commissioned by Jean-Baptiste-François Gigot d'Orcy published between 1779 and 1792 a publication illustrating the butterflies of Europe in 28 notebooks divided into 8 volumes of nearly 3000 drawings engraved then painted by hand which sold by subscription in 250 copies under the title: "Butterflies of Europe painted from nature by M.Ernst, engraved by M.Gérardin, and colored under their direction, described by R.P. Engramelle, Augustinian monk from the Saint Germain district". This work also illustrates lepidoptera from the cabinets of D'Orcy's fellow collector Johann Christian Gerning.

== Works ==
Marie-Dominique-Joseph Engramelle

- La tonotechnie, ou l'art de noter les cylindres, et tout ce qui est susceptible de notage dans les instrumens de concerts mechaniques : ouvrage nouveau (via Internet Archive) (Tonotechnie or the art of notating cylinders) Paris: Delaguette/ Basan & Poignant, 1775 (Facsimile editions Hermann, 1993).
- He also collaborated on L'art du facteur d'orgues (The Art of the Organ-Builder), by Dom Bedos de Celles, 1766–1778.

Jacques-Louis-Florentin Engramelle

- He contributed to Papillons d'Europe, peints d'après nature (via Internet Archive) (Butterflies of Europe painted from nature) by M.Ernst, engraved by M.Gérardin, and colored under their direction, described by R.P. Engramelle, Augustinian monk from the Saint Germain district, in Paris at Delaguette/ Basan & Poignant, 1779–1792.Several other illustrators contributed most notably Maria Eleonora Hochecker.
