= Jean-Baptiste-François Gigot d'Orcy =

French entomologist, mineralogist and patron of the arts (1737–1793)

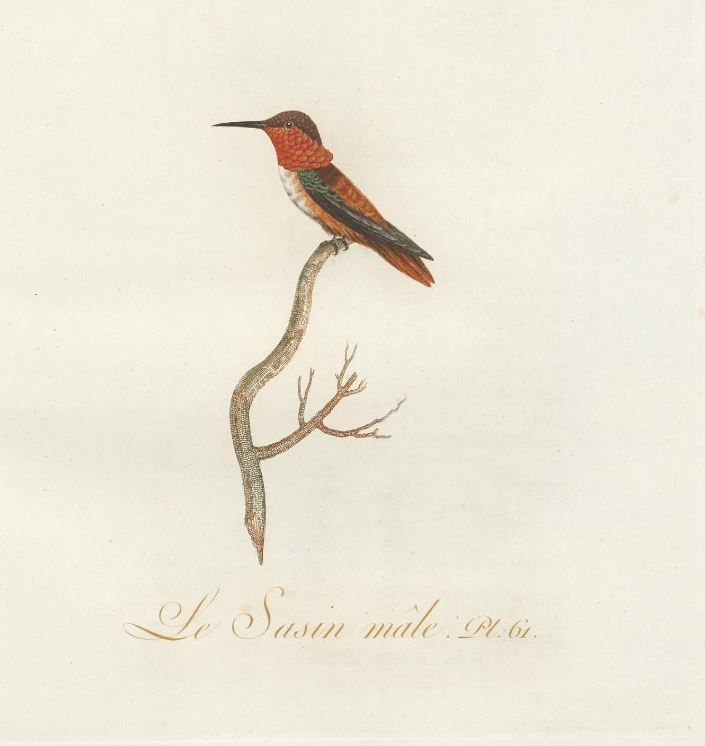
Illustration from Audebert's Histoire des colibris, oiseaux-mouches, jacamars et promerops a work supported by Gigot d'Orcy finally published in 1802

Jean-Baptiste-François Gigot d’Orcy, (January 8, 1737, in Sens - June 10, 1793, in Paris) was a French entomologist and mineralogist.

In 1788, he was a wealthy figure of the Ancien regime and receiver general of finances of the generality of Châlons-en-Champagne and lived in Paris at Place Vendôme in the parish of St-Roch. He was married to Madeleine Marie Anne Delamonnoie. He assembled an important natural history collection and library in his home on Place Vendôme. A naturalist and patron, he had his rich collection described by Jacques-Louis-Florentin Engramelle and supported the publication of works by contemporary naturalists such as Guillaume-Antoine Olivier and Jean-Baptiste Audebert. He was executed during the Terror.His mineral collection, studied by Arnould Carangeot, was purchased by George Gibbs.Other parts of the collection were acquired by the Boissier family in Geneva. His name is honoured as Rutela dorcyi Olivier, 1789

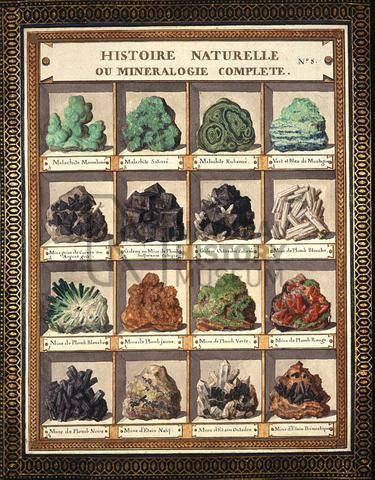
Minerals from the Gigot d'Orcy collection illustrated by François Louis Swebach-Desfontaines (1749-1793)

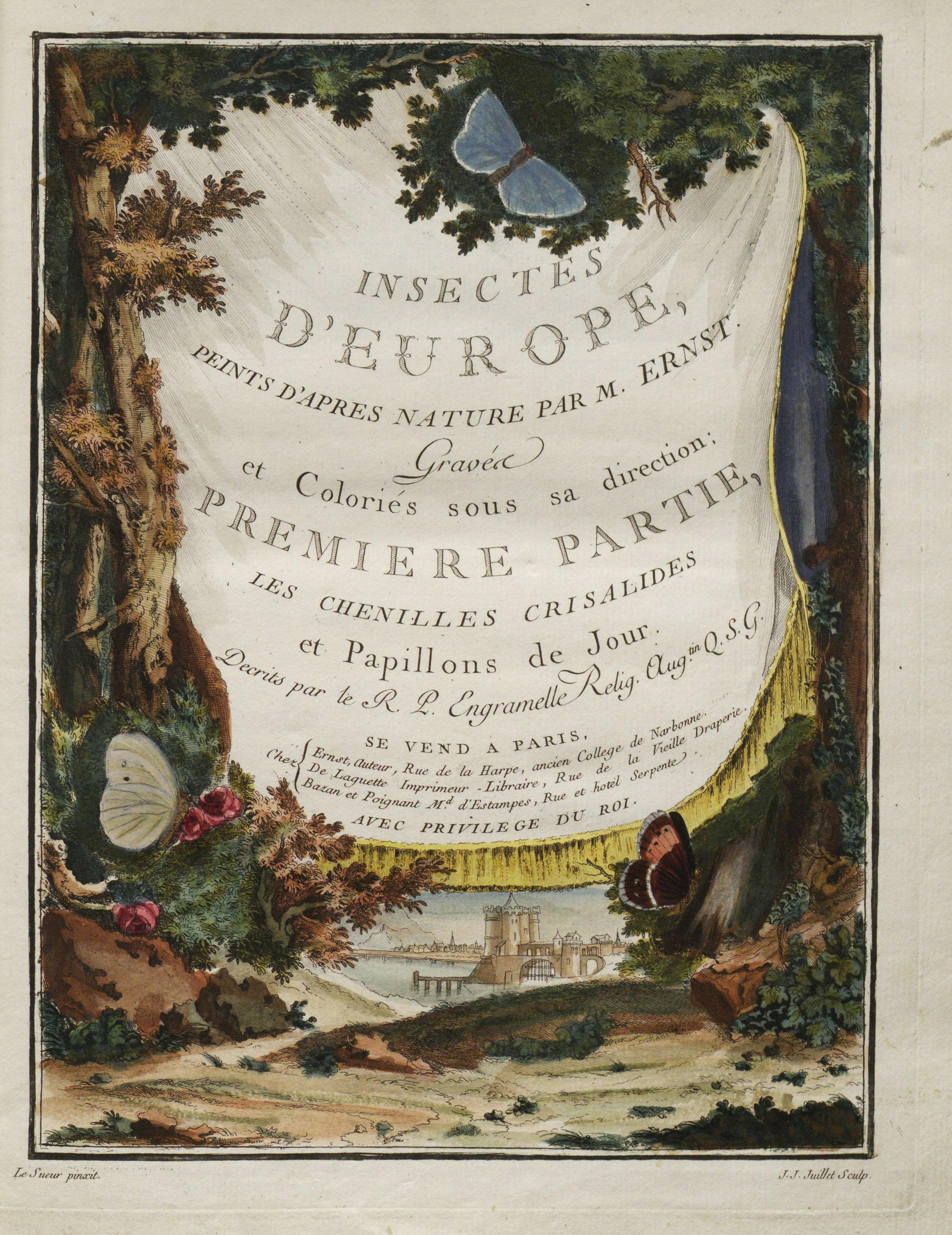
Papillons d'Europe Frontis Part 1

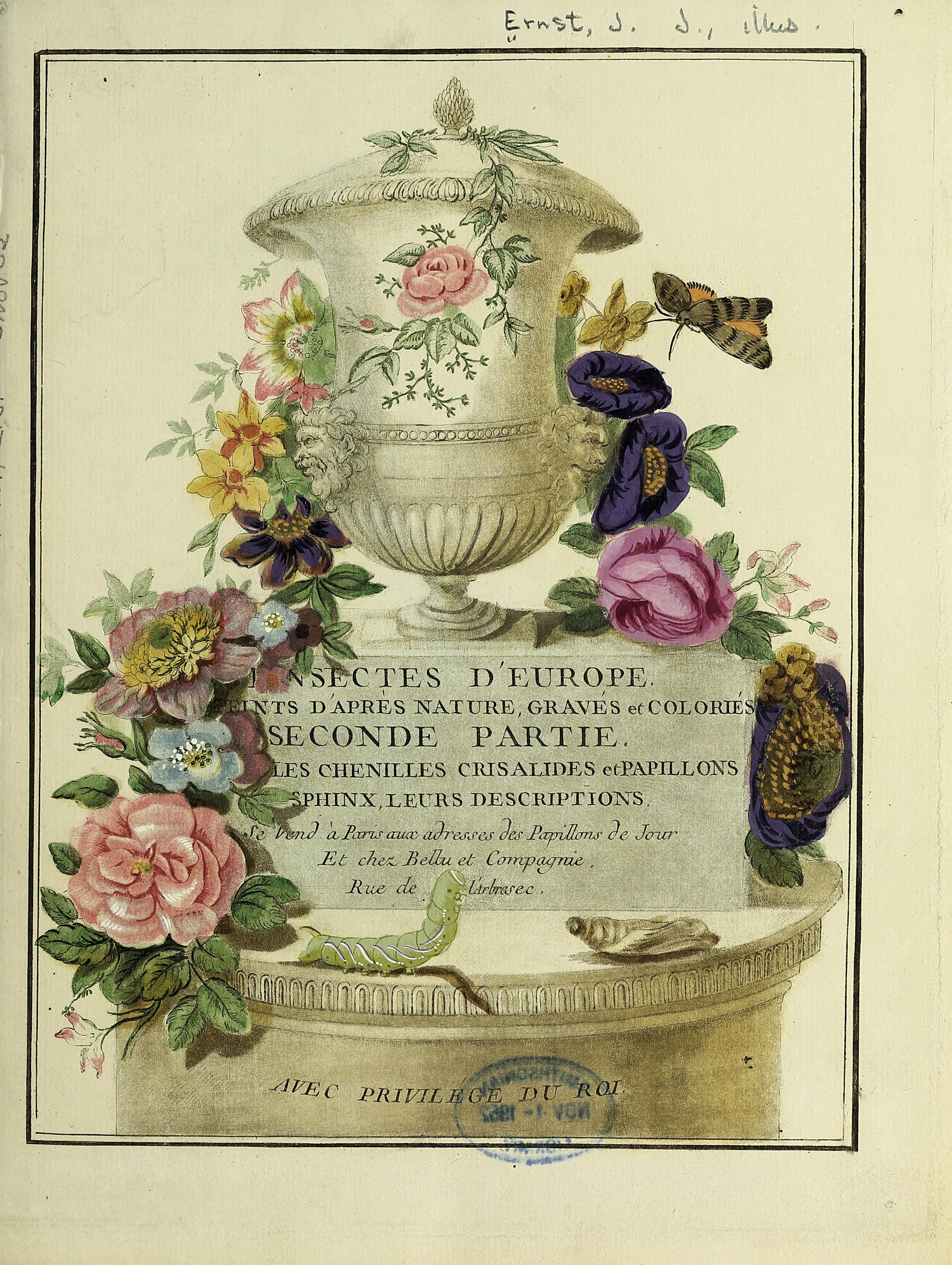
Papillons d'Europe Frontis Part 2

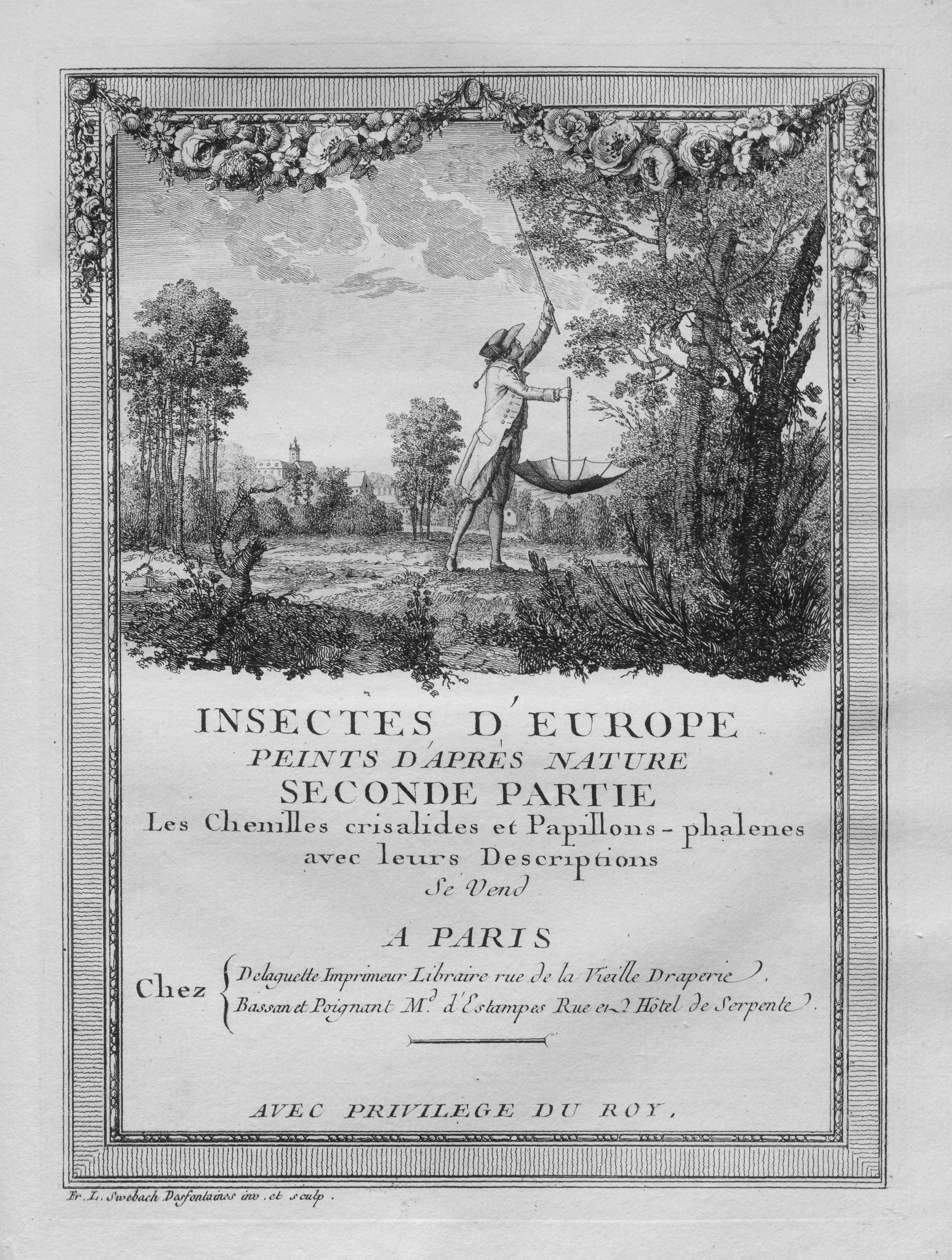
Illustration Collecting larvae

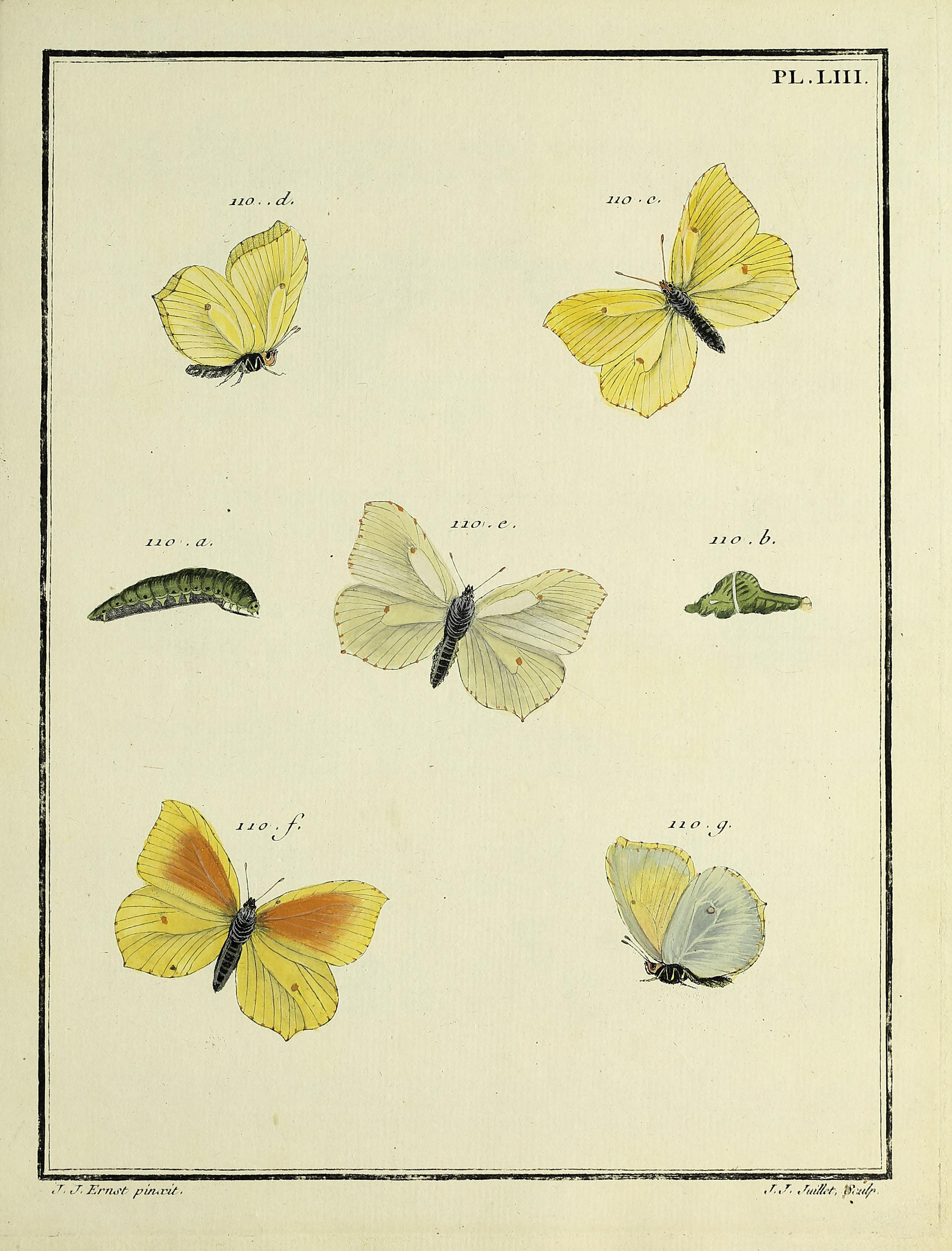
Papillons d'Europe plate LIII

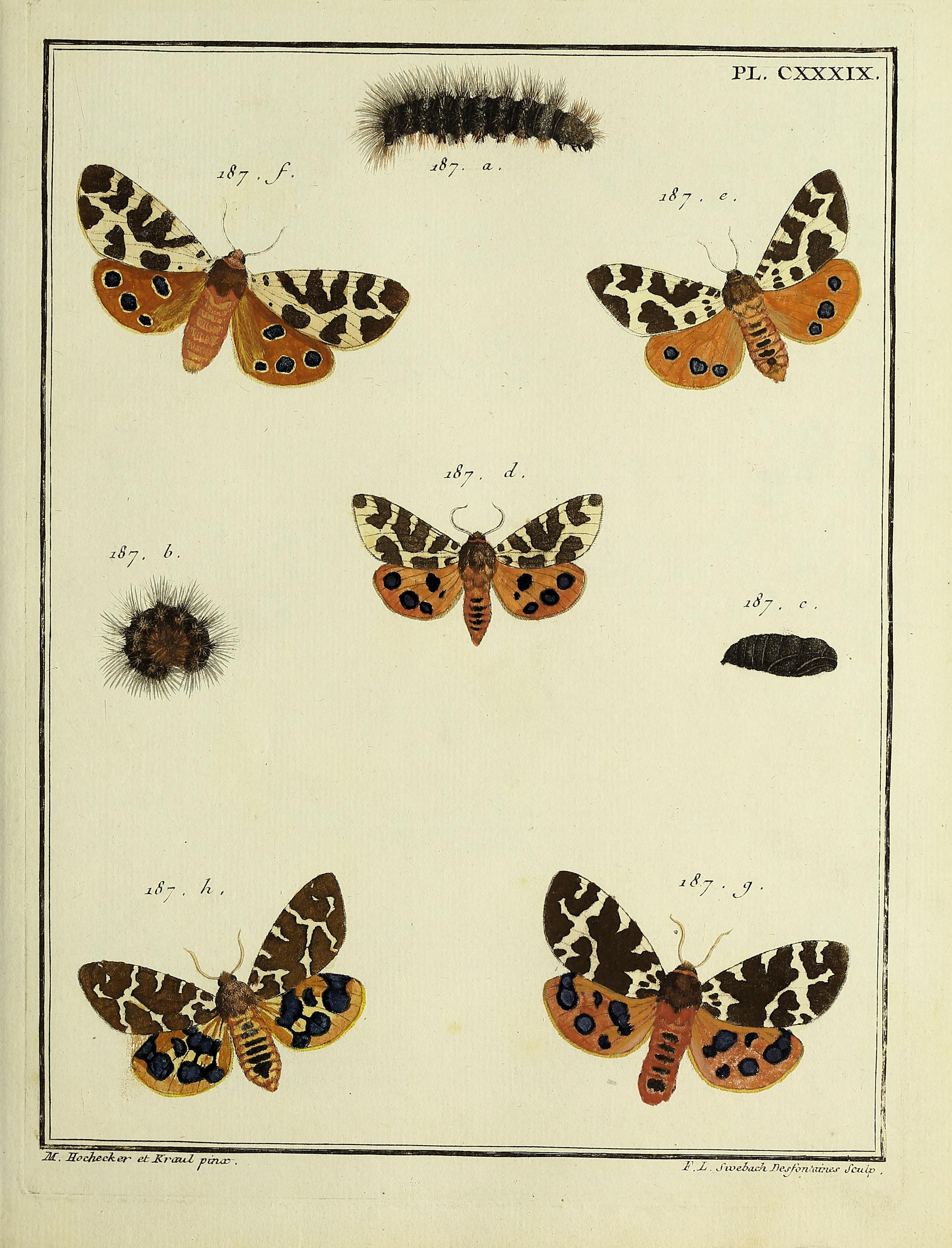
Insectes d'Europe (Atlas 2 Papillons) Plate CXXXIX

== See also ==
Jean Gigot d'Orcy's associates Johann Eusebius Voet, Jacob Christian Schäffer, Michael Denis and Ignaz Schiffermüller.
