= Guillaume-Antoine Olivier =

French entomologist (1756–1814)

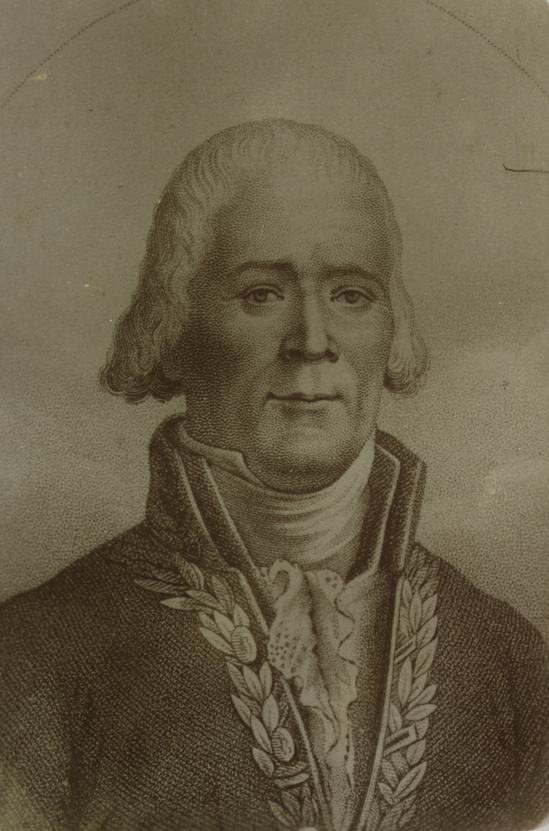
- Born: 19 January 1756; Les Arcs
- Died: 1 October 1814 (aged 58)
- Scientific career
- Fields: Entomology

Guillaume-Antoine Olivier (French pronunciation: [ɡijom ɑ̃twan ɔlivje]; 19 January 1756, Les Arcs near Toulon – 1 October 1814, Lyon) was a French entomologist and naturalist.

== Life ==
Olivier studied medicine in Montpellier, where he became good friends with Pierre Marie Auguste Broussonet. With Jean Guillaume Bruguière and Jean-Baptiste Lamarck .Jean-Baptiste-François Gigot d'Orcy later employed Olivier, who was then able to travel to England and Holland, meeting Thomas Martyn in London. In 1789 and 1790 he published the first two volumes of the Histoire naturelle des Coléoptères for Gigot d'Orcy, and simultaneously, thanks to Daubenton's recommendation, collaborated in the Dictionnaire de l'Histoire naturelle des Insectes, Papillons, Crustacés and collaborated in the creation of Journal d'Histoire Naturelle (1792). Afterwards, he served as a naturalist on a 6-year scientific journey that took him to Asia Minor, Persia, Egypt, Cyprus and Corfu. He returned to France in 1798 with a large collection of natural history specimens from his travels. Later, he was associated with the École nationale vétérinaire d'Alfort, where in 1811, he was appointed professor of zoology. Olivier was a close friend of Johan Christian Fabricius and a patron of Pierre André Latreille.

Although primarily an entomologist, Olivier also worked in the scientific field of herpetology, describing several new species of Asian lizards. He also described a few plant species, including Prunus arabica and Quercus libani.

== Works ==
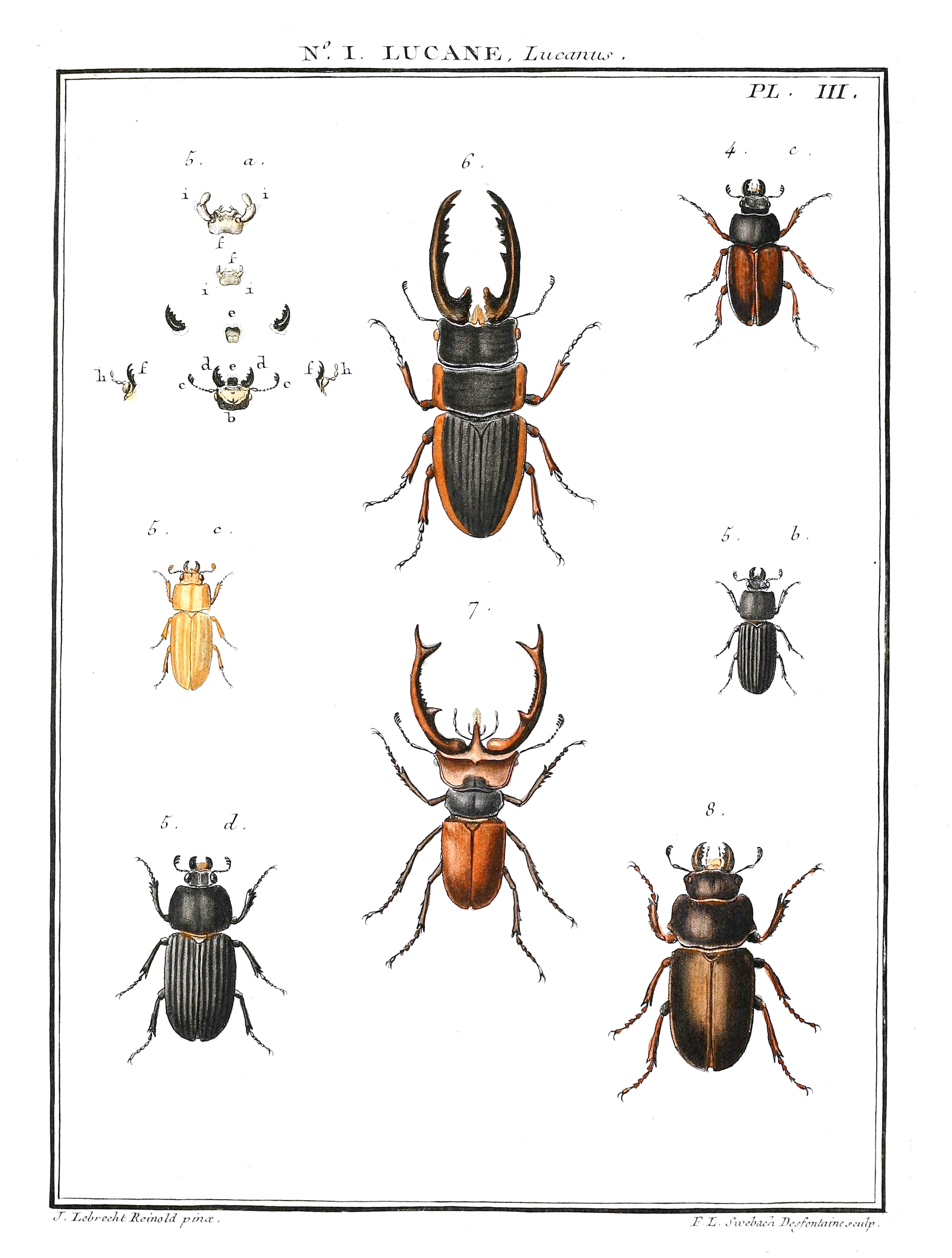
A plate from Entomologie, ou histoire naturelle des Insectes, 1808

Olivier was the author of Coléoptères Paris Baudouin 1789–1808 (11 editions), Entomologie, ou histoire naturelle des Insectes (1808) and Le Voyage dans l'Empire Othoman, l'Égypte et la Perse (1807). He was a contributor to Encyclopédie Méthodique.

== Legacy ==
Today, most of his collection is housed at the Museum National d'Histoire Naturelle in Paris.

A species of lizard, Mesalina olivieri, is named in his honor.
