= H. I. Biegeleisen =

American physician

Hyman Irving Biegeleisen (June 4, 1904 New York City – May 3, 1991, died at his home in Boca Raton, Florida) was an American physician and pioneer of phlebology. In 1964, he founded the Phlebology Society of America (now incorporated into the American College of Phlebology). He was one of the first medical doctors in the United States to use injection as a method of treating varicose veins, and coined the term sclerotherapy to describe the treatment.

== Early life ==
Biegelesin was born in New York City to parents who emigrated from Melitz, Austria (now Poland).

== Education ==
Beigeleisen graduated from Stuyvesant High School and Columbia University and received a medical degree from Long Island College Hospital (now part of SUNY Downstate Medical Center).
