= Jean Emond =

Jean C. Emond is the current Thomas S. Zimmer Professor of Surgery at the Columbia University College of Physicians & Surgeons. He is also a Vice Chair in the Department of Surgery and the Chief of Transplantation at NewYork-Presbyterian Hospital/Columbia University Medical Center. Dr. Emond completed both his undergraduate ('75) and medical training ('79) at the University of Chicago.

Emond participated in the first living-donor liver transplantation in children in North America. In 1997, Emond established the liver transplant program at Columbia, which has become one of the largest in the United States performing 152 liver transplants in 2006. Jean was featured on NY Med

== Selected publications ==
- One-year morbidity after donor right hepatectomy. Rudow DL, Brown RS Jr, Emond JC, Marratta D, Bellemare S, Kinkhabwala M. Liver Transpl. (11):1428-31. Nov. 2004.
- Interpretation of Liver Chemistries in Adult Donors After Living Donor Liver Transplantation. Russo MW, Lapointe-Rudow D, Teixeira A, Guarrera J, Dove LD, Gaglio P, Emond JC, Kinkhabwala M, Brown RS. J Clin Gastroenterol. (9):810-4. Oct. 2004.
- Organ Donation and Utilization in the United States. Ojo AO, Heinrichs D, Emond JC, McGowan JJ, Guidinger MK, Delmonico FL, Metzger RA. AmJ Transplantation. 4(Supp 9):27-37. 2004.
- Split liver transplantation in the United States: Outcomes of a national survey. Renz JF, Emond JC, Yersiz H, Ascher NL, Busuttil RW. Ann Surg. 239(2):172-81. Feb. 2004.
