= Jean-François d'Aubuisson de Voisins =

French engineer

Jean-François d’Aubuisson de Voisins (19 April 1769 – 20 August 1841) was a French geologist, mining engineer and Ultra-royalist politician and political theorist, who also contributed studies in hydrodynamics and hydrology.

== Life ==
D'Aubuisson was born in Toulouse, the son of a namesake squire and his wife Jeanne-Francoise Dassié. His early education was at the Benedictine College of Soréze from 1779. He moved to the Artillery School, Metz in 1786 and joined military service in 1791, serving six years in Spain. After the war he retired to Freiberg where he taught mathematics and simultaneously studied at the Bergakademie under Abraham Gottlob Werner. He translated Werner's work into French with annotations. He returned to France in 1802 and became an assistant to Jérôme Tonnelier (1751–1819) in 1803. He subscribed to the Wernerian view that basalts were formed by volcanism under the sea and confirmed the views of Guettard and Desmarest on the basalts at Auvergne. In 1807, d'Aubuisson was posted a mining engineer in the Piedmont and rose to chief engineer in 1811. In 1819 he published Traité de géognosie, ou Exposé des connaissances actuelles sur la constitution physique et minérale du globe terrestre, a geological treatise. He expanded the work into a multivolume work, the first appearing in 1828 and the second and third (appearing in 1834 and 1835) were taken over by Amédée Burat, professor of geology at the École Centrale. He then began to take in interest in air flow into mines and found that resistance to airflow varied proportional to the length of the pipe and the square of the speed of the air and inversely with the diameter. He published Traité du mouvement de l’eau dans les tuyaux de conduite (1827) and Histoire de l’établissement des fontaines à Toulouse (1830).

As a friend of count De Montbel and count De Villèle, D'Aubuisson was appointed to the municipal council of Toulouse for a period of 15 years by royal decree on the May 13th 1816. He would remain on the council until the July Revolution of 1830. In 1825, the year after Charles X rose to the throne, D'Aubuisson published Considérations sur l’Autorité Royale en France Depuis la Restauration et sur les Administrations Locales, in which he argued against the Restoration settlement and instead proposed a move towards a highly decentralised, aristocratic and organic kingdom based on the France of the Ancien régime.

D'Aubuisson was made correspondent of mineralogy to the French Academy of Sciences in February 1821 assuming that the Pierre-Bernard de Palassou had died. After realizing that Palassou was alive the academy allowed d'Aubuisson to retain the position. He married Louise Justine de Vignes de Puylaroque (1802–1864) in 1812. He rejected promotions that would transfer him to Paris and lived in Toulouse until his death.
