= Joshua Sonett =

American surgeon

Joshua R. Sonett is the Chief of General Thoracic Surgery, Surgical Director of Price Family Center for Comprehensive Chest Care, and an Attending Surgeon at NewYork-Presbyterian Hospital/Columbia University Medical Center. He is also a Professor of Clinical Surgery at Columbia University College of Physicians and Surgeons.

== Career ==
Sonett is best known for his work in the multidisciplinary treatment of lung and esophageal malignancies. Sonett and his team at Columbia work at developing and teaching techniques in Video Assisted Thoracic Surgery (VATS) and Minimally Invasive Esophageal (MIE) surgery. Sonett and his team pioneered and led development of utilizing immunotherapy and chemotherapy for induction of lung cancer. Initially, one of the few centers in the country to use a combination immunotherapy and chemotherapy followed by minimally invasive surgery.

In lung transplantation, Sonett is best known for incorporating expanded criteria donor lungs into the Lung Transplant Program at Columbia. Sonett and his team have been aggressively trying to alleviate the donor shortage by evaluating lungs which may be rejected from other centers. Between 2001 and 2003, 53 percent of the lungs transplanted at NewYork-Presbyterian/Columbia were extended donor criteria lungs, with no difference in survival between EDC lung recipients and regular lung recipients. Sonett's program has a 95% survival rate after one year, and 83% after three years, which far surpasses the national average of 79% and 62%, respectively.

Sonett was featured on NY Med.

== Press coverage ==
- On March 10, 2005, Sonett performed a pleural decortication on former President Bill Clinton to remove a thick band of hard scar tissue that had built up from his September 2004 quadruple heart bypass also at NYP.
- On February 16, 2005, Sonett was featured in a New York Times article, "Linked Forever by the Ultimate Gift: One Woman's Death Provides Life for Another," by Marc Santora. The article depicted the path of a lung transplant, from the family's decision to donate to the transplant operation and the recipient's recovery.

== Publications ==
- Induction curative intent radiotherapy (>59Gy) and concurrent chemotherapy with surgical resection in locally advanced non-small cell lung cancer: Operative feasibility and mid-term survival. Sonett, J.R., Suntharalingam, M., Edelman, M.J., Patel, A.B., et al. The Annals of Thoracic Surgery, October 2004.
- Expression of syndecan-1 and expression of epidermal growth factor receptor are associated with survival in patients with nonsmall cell lung carcinoma. Shah L., Walter KL, Borczuk AC, Kawut SM, Sonett JR, et al. Cancer, August 23, 2004.
- The course of neurofibromatiosis Type 1 on immunosuppression after lung transplantation: Report of 2 cases. Merlo, C.A., Studer, S.M., Conte, J.V., Yang, S.C., Sonett, J.R., Orens, J.B. Journal of Heart and Lung Transplantation, 23:774-6, 2004.
- Extracellular regulated kinase/mitogen activated protein kinase is up-regulated in pulmonary emphysema and mediates matrix metalloproteinase-1 induction by cigarette smoke. Mercer, B.A., Kolesnikova N, Sonett, J.R., D’Armiento J. Journal of Biological Chemistry, 279(19): 17690-6, April 23, 2004
