= California Society of Addiction Medicine =

- Formation: 1973
- Headquarters: Sacramento, California
- President: Dr. Dana Harris
- Website: https://csam-asam.org/

California Society of Addiction Medicine (CSAM) is the California organization of physicians who specialize in treating addiction. The organization was founded in 1972 as the California Society for the Treatment of Alcoholism and Other Drug Dependencies. It was incorporated in 1973 as the California Society of Addiction Medicine. CSAM has been a State Chapter of the American Society of Addiction Medicine since 1989.

CSAM advances the treatment of alcoholism and other addictions through education of physicians, physicians-in-training, and other health professionals. Additionally, CSAM promotes research, prevention and implementation of evidence-based treatment. It advocates for legislation and regulations that improve and expand substance abuse treatment.

As of 2025, Dr. Dana Harris is president of CSAM.

== Education ==
CSAM provides a wide range of continuing medical education, including a nationally recognized preparatory course for the American Board of Addiction Medicine (ABAM) Certification Exam. CSAM also holds an annual conference on the State of the Art in Addiction Medicine and workshops on issues ranging from pain, addiction and screening and brief intervention, to opioid treatment and trauma and addiction.

== Research ==
The Medical Education and Research Foundation for the treatment of alcoholism and other drug dependencies was established in 1981 as a sister organization to the California Society of Addiction Medicine. The Foundation's mission is to increase and improve the education of physicians about all aspects of addiction, including harmful drinking or drug use, medical sequelae, family impact, and how to support recovery. Its primary activities are mentored learning experiences at CSAM's annual, three-day addiction medicine conferences.

== Advocacy ==
CSAM members advocate for greater treatment access and improved treatment at the state level among California elected officials and regulators, while partnering with many other medical and nongovernmental organizations. Among the issues that CSAM supports are increasing funding for addiction treatment, raising standards for the substance abuse treatment workforce, improving treatment and prevention for adolescents and young adults and providing better treatment opportunities for health professionals who suffer from the disease of addiction.

== Resources ==
CSAM offers a wide range of information on addiction medicine to health professionals, including materials from its educational conferences and programs, as well as a quarterly newsletter.
