= Electrochemical quartz crystal microbalance =

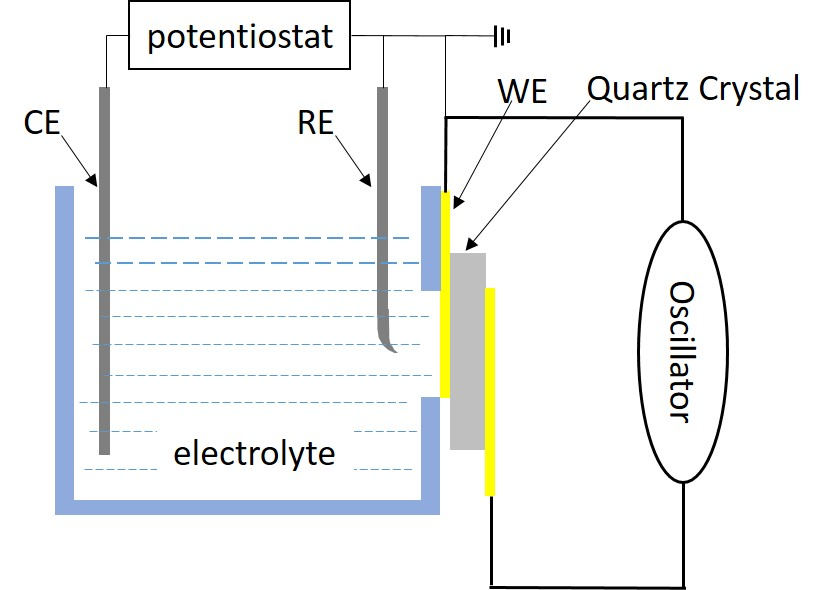
Schematic Electrochemical Quartz Crystal Microbalance

Electrochemical quartz crystal microbalance (EQCM) is the combination of electrochemistry and quartz crystal microbalance, which was generated in the eighties. Typically, an EQCM device contains an electrochemical cells part and a QCM part. Two electrodes on both sides of the quartz crystal serve two purposes. Firstly, an alternating electric field is generated between the two electrodes to make up the oscillator. Secondly, the electrode contacting electrolyte is used as a working electrode (WE), together with a counter electrode (CE) and a reference electrode (RE), in the potentiostatic circuit constituting the electrochemistry cell. Thus, the working electrode of electrochemistry cell is the sensor of QCM.

As a high mass sensitive in-situ measurement, EQCM is suitable to monitor the dynamic response of reactions at the electrode–solution interface at the applied potential. When the potential of a QCM metal electrode changes, a negative or positive mass change is monitored depending on the ratio of anions adoption on the electrode surface and the dissolution of metal ions into solution.

== EQCM calibration ==
The EQCM sensitivity factor K can be calculated by combing the electrochemical cell measured charge density and QCM measured frequency shift. The sensitivity factor is only valid when the mass change on the electrode is homogenous. Otherwise, K is taken as the average sensitivity factor of the EQCM.

$\Delta f=-\left(\frac{2 f_o^2}{S\sqrt{\mu\rho}}\right)\Delta m=-K\Delta m$

where $\Delta f$ is the measured frequency shift (Hz), S is the quartz crystal active area (cm^{2}), ρ is the density of quartz crystal, $\mu$ is the quartz crystal shear modulus and $f_o$ is the fundamental quartz crystal frequency. K is the intrinsic sensitivity factor of the EQCM.

In a certain electrolyte solution, a metal film will deposited on the working electrode, which is the QCM sensor surface of QCM.

$M^{z+}+ze^- \longrightarrow M$

The charge density ($\frac{\Delta Q}{C}\cdot \mathrm{cm}^{-2}$) is involved in the electro-reduction of metal ions at a constant current $I$, in a period of time $\Delta T$ ($\Delta Q= I \Delta t$).

The active areal mass density is calculated by

$\Delta m=\frac{A_m}{zF}\Delta Q$

where $A_m$ is the atomic weight of deposited metal, z is the electrovalency, and F is the Faraday constant.

The experimental sensitivity of the EQCM is calculated by combing $\Delta m$ and $\Delta f$.

$K= -\frac{zF}{A_m} \frac{\Delta f}{\Delta Q}$

== EQCM application ==
=== Application of EQCM in electrosynthesis ===
EQCM can be used to monitor the chemical reaction occurring on the electrode, which offers the optimized reaction condition by comparing the influence factors during the synthesis process. Some previous work has already investigated the polymerization process and charge transport properties, polymer film growth on gold electrode surface, and polymerization process of polypyrrole and its derivatives. EQCM was used to study electro-polymerization process and doping/de-doping properties of polyaniline film on gold electrode surface as well. To investigate the electrosynthesis process, sometimes it is necessary to combine other characterization technologies, such as using FTIR and EQCM to study the effect of different conditions on the formation of poly(3,4-ethylenedioxythiophene) film structure, and using EQCM, together with AFM, FTIR, EIS, to investigate the film formation process in the alkyl carbonate/lithium salt electrolyte solution on precious metal electrodes surfaces.

=== Application of EQCM in electrodeposition and dissolution ===
EQCM is broadly used to study the deposition/dissolution process on electrode surface, such as the oscillation of electrode potential during Cu/CuO_{2} layered nanostructure electrodeposition, deposition growth process of cobalt and nickel hexacyanoferrate in calcium nitrate and barium nitrate electrolyte solution, and the Mg electrode electrochemical behaviour in various polar aprotic electrolyte solutions. EQCM can be used as a powerful tool for corrosion and corrosion protection study, which is usually combined with other characterization technologies. A previous work used EQCM and XPS studied Fe-17Cr-33Mo/ Fe-25Cr alloy electrodes mass changes during the potential sweep and potential step experiments in the passive potential region in an acidic and a basic electrolyte. Another previous work used EQCM and SEM to study the influence of purine (PU) on Cu electrode corrosion and spontaneous dissolution in NaCl electrolyte solution.

=== Application of EQCM in adsorption and desorption ===
EQCM has been used to study the self-assembled monolayers of long chain alkyl mercaptan and alkanethiol and mercaptoalkanoic on gold electrode surface.

=== Application of EQCM in polymer modified electrode ===
EQCM can be used to ideally modify polymer membranes together with other electrochemical measurements or surface characterization methods. A team has used CV, UV-Vis, IR and EQCM studied irreversible changes of some polythiophenes in the electrochemical reduction process in acetonitrile. Later on they used AFM and EQCM investigated growth of polypyrrole film in anionic surfactant micellar solution. Then combing with CV, UV-Vis, FTIR, ESR, they used EQCM to study conductivity and magnetic properties of 3,4-dimethoxy and 3,4-ethylenedioxy-terminated polypyrrole and polythiophene.

=== Application of EQCM in energy conversion and storage ===
EQCM can be used to study the process of adsorption and oxidation of fuel molecules on the electrode surface, and the effect of electrode catalyst or other additives on the electrode, such as assessment of polypyrrole internal Pt load in the polypyrrole/platinum composites fuel cell, methanol fuel cell anodizing process, and electrodeposition of cerium oxide suspended nanoparticles doped with gadolinium oxide under the ultrasound for Co/CeO_{2} and Ni/CeO_{2} composite fuel cells. EQCM can also be used to study the energy storage performance and influencing factors of supercapacitors and electrochemical capacitors. For example, EQCM is used to study the ion movement gauge of conductive polymer of capacitor on cathode. Some work studied the EQCM application in solar energy, which is mostly additive and thin film material related, for instance, using EQCM to study the electrochemical deposition process and stability of Co-Pi oxygen evolution catalyst for solar storage.
