= The Flying Samaritans =

Non-profit organization providing free healthcare to residents of Baja California, Mexico

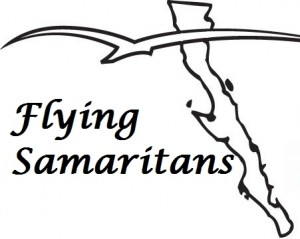
The Flying Samaritans

The Flying Samaritans is a non-profit organization dedicated to providing free health care for underserved populations in Baja California, Mexico. The organization consists of ten different chapters, each with up to eight branches, that all operate a medical clinic in Baja California. Volunteer students, doctors, nurses, pilots, and other health professionals travel with their Flying Samaritans branch to their respective clinic locations and run anywhere from one-day to weekend long clinics on a monthly basis. Now with more than 1500 members the Flying Samaritans mission has spread broadly across California, Arizona, and Baja California.

The Flying Samaritans' organization has four main principles: to provide primary care, specialty care, education, and emergency care. Each branch operates slightly differently, however, all strive to attain the same goal in improving healthcare outcomes for the underserved populations of Baja California. To enliven the first tenant of their mission each branch provides quality primary care to those populations that would otherwise have none. Most of the Flying Samaritans clinics are located in areas in which medical services are sparse, and therefore primary care through their clinic is essential. Those branches that do provide specialty care, such as surgery, operate in areas in which follow up is provided to ensure quality services are implemented. In order to attain educational outcomes the Flying Samaritans' branches work both to educate their volunteers, who in many instances are pre-health professionals, but also to educate their populations in order to provide more preventative and sustainable care. Some branches work specifically with pasantes who are first-year Mexican medical students that must fulfill a one-year government requirement in order to graduate medical school. Finally, emergency care is provided through disaster relief and other critical medical needs at various clinic locations.

== History ==
On November 16, 1961, a group of six passengers, and a pilot by the name of Aileen Saunders, took off from La Paz, Baja California, Mexico. Headed for San Diego, the crew was forced to stop short when they unexpectedly encountered adverse weather along their course. After a stop in Bahia de Los Angeles, Aileen hit dust storms preventing her from landing in Tijuana or San Diego. She decided to land in Ensenada for the time being, but within three minutes of landing she suddenly could not see the ground as well as the 5,000 to 7,000 foot peaks in the area. Forced to circle the area avoiding the peaks, they eventually flew over the storm, and decided to land on a strip outside of the El Rosario community. In El Rosario the general store's proprietor, Anita Espinosa, acted as a translator for the group while giving them accommodations and hot chocolate. Anita told the travelers about the village's recent devastation from flooding, and the somber spirits in the community. She told them that the people would be grateful for clothing donations, and also mentioned the poor health of many community members.

Returning to San Diego, Aileen and the two other pilot passengers, Leah Hanlon and Polly Ross, began collecting donations. They returned to El Rosario the Saturday prior to that year's Christmas carrying with them a surplus of clothing, food, and toys. On the excursion was also a doctor who brought with him his medical bag. Upon arriving in the community the doctor was mobbed by sick villagers, and so was born the Flying Samaritans, originally named by the people of El Rosario the Flying Angels. This same doctor not long after returned with nurses and other medical professionals, making trips every other week to provide the community with much needed medical care. They first operated out of the virtually abandoned local hospital, Hospital Civil de El Rosario, and worked to turn it into a facility they could use to treat patients.

Expanding to over 20 clinic locations in more than 50 years, now the Flying Samaritans has grown to serve many populations like El Rosario across Baja California, Mexico. With the many additional chapters and branches in California, Arizona, and Baja California the organization now consists of a much larger population that provides the same quality healthcare by motor vehicle. Each branch is made up of a unique group of leaders and volunteers that travel to their respective clinics operating under the same mission founded by the original Flying Angels.

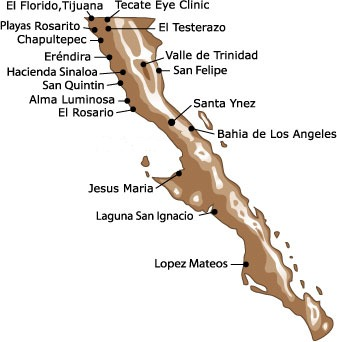
Map of the Flying Samaritans Clinics in Baja California, Mexico

== Chapters and branches ==
=== Central Valley Chapter (Modesto): San Felipe ===
The Central Valley Chapter operates an ENT, optometry, and ophthalmology clinic, in San Felipe, Baja California Mexico. They perform ENT surgeries and eye surgeries including cataract removals.

=== Gold Coast Chapter (San Luis Obispo): San Quintin ===
The Gold Coast Chapter operates largely out of San Luis Obispo, and travels to San Quintin, Baja California to perform specialty surgeries at Hospital EL Buen Pastor usually on the third Saturday of each month. They travel with volunteer medical professionals, pilots, and students spending Friday morning through Sunday in San Quintin.

=== Mother Lode Chapter (Fair Oaks): Los Pinos ===
The Flying Samaritans Mother Lode chapter was founded in 1977 and is composed largely of volunteers from the Central and Northern parts of California. They operate their monthly clinic, Alma Luminosa, on the second Saturday of each month in San Quintin, Rancho Los Pinos, roughly 200 miles south of the border.

=== Palomar Chapter (Bonsall) ===
The Palomar chapter of the Flying Samaritans is divided into nine branches: Chapultepec, El Hongo, El Testerazo, Eréndira, Tecate Eye Clinic, Valle Redondo, El Florido, Colonia Margarita Moran, and La Misión. Made up largely of Southern Californian volunteers as well as many student-run groups, this chapter consists of a mostly driving population of Flying Sams.

==== Colonia Margarita Moran: The Flying Samaritans at UCLA ====
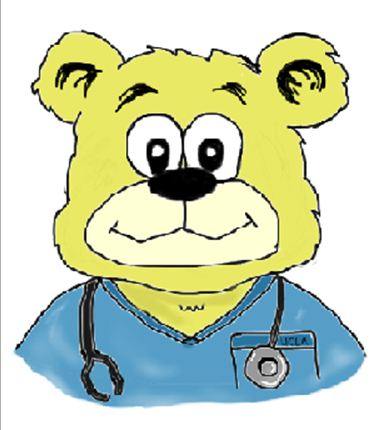
http://www.flyingsamaritansatucla.org

The Flying Samaritans at UCLA was founded in 2012 by Rebecca Barber and Lyolya Hovhannisyan, two undergraduate pre-health students. This Flying Samaritans clinic operates in Colonia Margarita Moran, Mexico every third Saturday of the month. It is roughly a three-hour drive from Los Angeles just east of the Otay Mesa border crossing. Also an organization at UCLA with over 200 members, the UCLA Flying Samaritans branch has grown rapidly since its formation. The Flying Samaritans at UCLA strives to provide its community with more than just immediate health care. They have devoted additional resources towards improving the overall quality of life for the community, and have conducted community needs assessments in order to better understand how to help the people of Colonia Margarita Moran. With the $10,000 scholarship Lyolya and Rebecca received in 2012 from the Donald A. Strauss Foundation they have been able to implement even more comprehensive health education projects at their clinic. Each month Flying Sams at UCLA travels to their clinic in the community and provides roughly 30 patients with free medical care, as well as, provides educational seminars for adults and children about health topics such as diabetes, cholesterol, hygiene, and exercise. The Flying Samaritans at UCLA has a goal to improve the lives of the people in Colonia Margarita Moran by working directly with community leaders and members to address more than just their health needs.

==== Chapultepec: The Flying Samaritans at UCSD ====
In 1999 the Flying Samaritans at UCSD was founded, but it was not until 2001 after much negotiation with the Mexican government that their clinic in Chapultepec, Ensenada, Baja California, Mexico officially opened. They operate their clinic in a Centro de Desarollo owned by the Mexican Family Health Department (DIF). Raj Chudassama, Lori Lamb, and Ritesh Bhayani founded the UCSD Flying Samaritans clinic. In 2012 President Anelah McGuiness won the Donald A. Strauss Scholarship giving her $10,000 to create a dental clinic for their Flying Samaritans branch. In 2013 they also formed a collaboration with the Rancho El Faro Orphanage in El Porvenir, an orphanage operated by the non-profit organization Corazon De Vida. They have worked on public health projections, given many check-ups, hosted donation drives, and are working to construct a chicken coop at the orphanage.

==== El Hongo: The Flying Samaritans at UCR and Cal State Fullerton ====
The El Hongo branch of the Flying Samaritans was founded through a collaboration between UC Riverside and Cal State Fullerton students in 2005. El Hongo is roughly 30 minutes east of Tecate where they travel to their clinic every third Saturday of the month.

==== Eréndira ====
The Eréndira branch of the Flying Samaritans is operated largely by students from Palomar College, UC San Diego, San Diego State University, and Cal State San Marcos. They travel roughly 3 hours past the United States border to reach their clinic in Eréndira where both dental and medical services are provided to the community.

==== Tecate Eye Clinic ====
The Tecate Eye clinic provides free optometry and ophthalmology services to patients in the Tecate area, as well as, referral patients from other local Flying Samaritans branches. Operating on the third Saturday of each month, volunteer ophthalmologists, optometrists, and medical assistants travel to their clinic, owned by the Mexican Family Health Department (DIF), in Tecate to provide free surgeries and eye care to as many patients as possible.

==== Ejido Matamoros: The Flying Samaritans at San Diego State University ====
The Flying Samaritans at SDSU was founded in 2010 by Matthew Schrader, an undergraduate pre-health student at SDSU. Operating their clinic in Ejido Matamoros, roughly 15 minutes over the Otay Mesa border crossing, they travel on the second Saturday of each month to run their free medical clinic. Now also providing dental services, as well as, in the past women's clinics run by OB/GYNs, Public Health and physical therapy sessions to assist with daily life activity pains and strengthening.

==== La Misión Clinic ====
The La Misión branch of Flying Samaritans was founded in 2019 through a collaboration between Cal Poly Pomona student Shweta Thakur and CSU San Marcos alumni Nicolas Sesno and John Tagulao. The clinic serves the people of La Misión, a village located in Baja California, Mexico. It is situated 44 miles south of the San Ysidro border and sits between the cities of Rosarito to the north and Ensenada to the south. La Misión clinic has been operating clinics since January 2022 on the second Saturday of the month. The clinic provides free primary care, medications, physical therapy and donations to the residents of La Misión.

=== Arizona Chapters ===
The Flying Samaritans in Arizona has two chapters, Phoenix and Tucson, which in total operate three clinics in Baja California.

==== Phoenix: Lopez Mateos and Laguna San Ignacio ====
The Phoenix chapter of the Arizona Flying Samaritans, based out of the Phoenix Metropolitan area, was founded in 1991. This chapter provides medical and dental care to Puerto Adolfo López Mateos and Laguna San Ignacio.

==== Tucson: El Rosario ====
The Tucson chapter operates a clinic in El Rosario, which is 25 miles south of San Qunitin. In 2008 this chapter began a collaboration with the University of Arizona to create a clinic in Agua Prieta just over the border in Agua Prieta, Sonora.

=== Playas de Rosarito Chapter: Rosarito Beach ===
The Rosarito Beach Flying Samaritans clinic was founded in 1994 by Nancy Callison, R.N., and B.J. Carpenter. At first operating out of Luis Menjare's family home then moving through various clinics donated by local doctors, the branch is now in the process of building its own facilities. Providing primary care to 300 patients a month as well as hearing and eye care to roughly 50 patients a month, this branch has grown rapidly to best serve the roughly 1.5 million residents of Rosarito Beach.

=== Southern California Chapter (Long Beach) ===
The Southern California Chapter of the Flying Samaritans, previously known as the Foothill Chapter, was founded in 1977 by Gordon Gray a retired US Marine pilot. Bill and Boz French founded the first clinic in El Arco, a remote mining village 25 miles east of Guerro Negro. After ten years of servicing the community the mines closed down and most residents left the village and therefore the Flying Samaritans closed their clinic.

Jesus Maria clinic was founded in 1987 as the second clinic within the Southern California Chapter, after the El Arco clinic closed down. They travel on the second Saturday of each month to provide dental and medical services and occasionally optometry and gynecology services. Other branches in the Southern California chapter include Bahia De Los Angeles, Hacienda Sinaloa, Santa Ynez, El Niño, and El Testerazo.

==== El Niño ====
The El Niño branch of the Flying Samaritans is run by UC Irvine medical students in the community of El Niño about 30 minutes south of the US border. Medical students have the chance to practice their clinical skills while helping the community and gaining an understanding of the culture of El Niño.

==== El Testerazo: The Flying Samaritans at UCI ====
The UC Irvine undergraduate branch of the Flying Samaritans operates in El Testerazo, Baja California, Mexico about 30 miles southeast of Tecate. They also now run a dental clinic, as well as, provide public health education and projects to their community. Traveling the third Saturday of each month students from UCI along with health professional volunteers make their way to the clinic to see as many patients as they can. This is the oldest clinic in the Palomar chapter and it has existed for over 40 years
