= Alphonso D'Abruzzo =

Alphonso D'Abruzzo may refer to:

- Robert Alda, American actor, whose birth name was Alphonso Giuseppe Giovanni Roberto D'Abruzzo
- Alan Alda, American actor, whose birth name was Alphonso Joseph D'Abruzzo (son of the Alphonso Giuseppe Giovanni Roberto D'Abruzzo listed above)
