= Dianna Cowern =

American science communicator (born 1989)

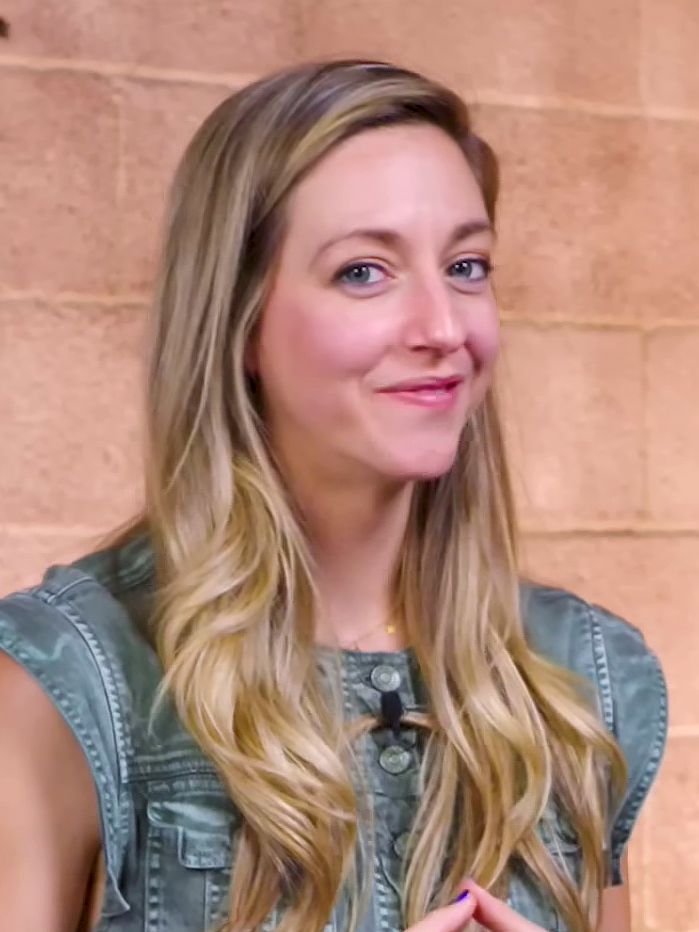
- Cowern in August 2021
- Born: May 4, 1989 (age 37)
- Education: Massachusetts Institute of Technology (SB)
- Occupation: Science communicator

YouTube information
- Channel: Physics Girl
- Years active: 2011–present
- Genre: Science education
- Subscribers: 3.48 million
- Views: 525 million
- Last updated: March 3, 2026
- Website: physicsgirl.org

Dianna Cowern (born May 4, 1989) is an American science communicator and physicist, who has run the YouTube channel Physics Girl since its inception in 2011. Her videos explain physical phenomena in everyday life, using an informal, fast-paced style. The series was produced in partnership with the PBS Digital Studios from 2015 until 2020.

Cowern started Physics Girl in 2011 after graduating with a bachelor's degree in physics from the Massachusetts Institute of Technology. After winning a 2014 video competition from the Alan Alda Center for Communicating Science, the series started being produced by PBS Digital Studios, whereupon she began working on content creation full-time. Cowern won Best Web Personality at the 2018 Webby Awards and was included in the 2019 Forbes 30 under 30. She developed long COVID in July 2022, becoming housebound and unable to produce videos until 2026.

== Early life and education ==
Dianna Cowern was born on May 4, 1989, and raised on Kauai island in Hawaii. Her father was a tree farmer and her mother ran a bed and breakfast. Through most of her early education, Cowern was fascinated by mathematics. She attended the Island School (Note: Cowern, Dianna. https://x.com/thephysicsgirl/status/1377495163036184576. X. March 31, 2021. Archived from the original on April 23, 2026. "Island School on Kauai. The tiny one. That’s really cool!! Where do they teach geology in Hawaiian?"): a K-12 private school that had eighty students in her high school class, and has credited her two physics teachers with sparking her interest in the subject. During this time, she was inspired by Neil deGrasse Tyson and became interested in science communication. In her junior year, Cowern was named a Commended Student in the 2007 National Merit Scholarship Program.

Cowern studied physics at the Massachusetts Institute of Technology (MIT), graduating in 2011 with a Bachelor of Science. While at MIT, she researched dark matter under Jocelyn Monroe. After graduation, Cowern was a research fellow at the Harvard–Smithsonian Center for Astrophysics, where she researched low-metallicity stars under Anna Frebel. After her fellowship, she moved to San Diego.

== Career ==
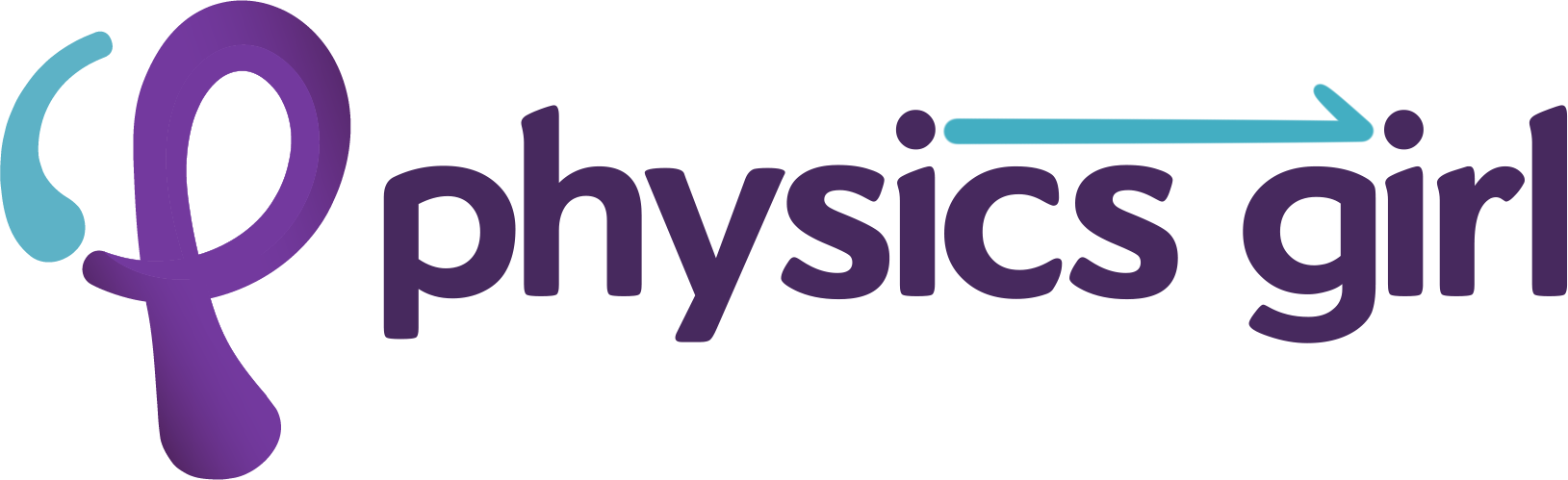
The logo of the Physics Girl YouTube channel

Cowern started her YouTube channel on October 21, 2011. Her first video, "What to do with a physics degree...", was made shortly after she finished college. Cowern made it as a joke for friends, but it got more views than she expected. As her videos gained viewers, she renamed her channel Physics Girl and shifted toward teaching physics concepts. When Cowern started making videos, she worked as an iPad app developer at General Electric. She then worked as an educator at Fleet Science Center and the outreach coordinator at University of California at San Diego's Center for Astrophysics and Space Sciences research unit.

In 2014, Cowern won the top video prize in the Flame Challenge from the Alan Alda Center for Communicating Science at Stony Brook University. The competition, which had the topic "What is color?", was judged by fifth-grade students. Her channel became popular around this time; in the following months, she had some viral videos and collaborated with YouTubers such as Veritasium. A December 2014 video explaining fluid dynamics by creating a vortex in a swimming pool was her first to get five million views. After news coverage of Cowern winning the Flame Challenge, she was contacted by PBS Digital Studios. The studio began producing Physics Girl in 2015, when the channel had about 35 videos and 125 thousand subscribers. The channel became Cowern's full-time job. That year, she participated in a conference organized by the U.S. News & World Report in San Diego.

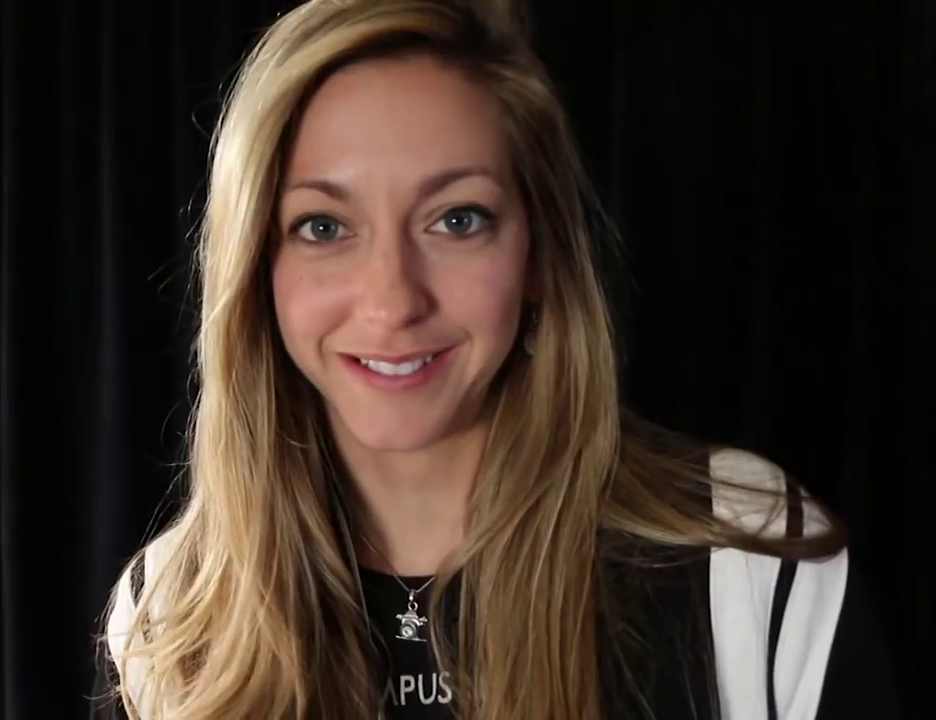
Cowern during Vidcon 2018

By 2017, PBS Digital Studios produced thirty-two Physics Girl videos per year. The channel featured ArcAttack in a 2016 video about electromagnets and Rodney Mullen in a 2018 video about axes of rotation in skateboarding tricks. In 2019, Cowern hosted the 2019 Google Science Fair. On September 25, 2020, Cowern announced that her channel was ending its partnership with the PBS. A 2021 series of Physics Girl videos, sponsored by Toyota, demonstrated a hydrogen fuel cell car and discussed renewable energy. By 2022, she was one of the most-subscribed science communicators on YouTube.

== Channel style ==
Physics Girl is about physical phenomena in everyday life. The videos have an eccentric, informal style. The channel has covered topics including curveballs and creating a cloud with one's mouth, as well as higher-level physics concepts. It also has an AP Physics exam review series. Cowern's videos are edited with frequent jump cuts; she told Nature in 2018 that her videos took up to a week to make and that she made fast-paced videos because viewers "can click away at any moment."

Cowern has said her goals are to give children an interest in physics and to show underrepresented groups such as women in science. According to media scholar Nicholas Qyll, Cowern is part of "a new generation of self-confident scientists who use entertaining communication of scientific topics on social media to reach and give lasting inspiration to an increasingly large audience".

== Awards and honors ==
In 2018, Cowern won a Webby Award for Best Web Personality. The following year, she was listed in Forbes 30 under 30 in the category of education. On March 17, 2025, the International Astronomical Union named the asteroid 21943 Diannacowern, previously designated as 1999 VG_{114}, in recognition of her contributions to science communication.

== Personal life ==
In May 2022, Cowern announced that she had recently married Kyle Kitzmiller. In July 2022, Cowern developed long COVID. She was hospitalized in March 2023 as her symptoms, similar to myalgic encephalomyelitis/chronic fatigue syndrome, continued to worsen. She became unable to move and stayed at home, with her husband as her caretaker. Cowern's sister created a donation fund. In a January 2025 YouTube video, Cowern said that she was now able to stand on her own for short periods of time. In May 2025, she posted an update to her channel, indicating that she had improved significantly and was able to walk independently. From July to September 2025, her health declined, leading to her being bedridden again. As of January 2026, she had improved somewhat, and had again become able to produce science videos. In March 2026, she published her first science video in three years. She experienced a PEM crash two days after filming the video, and has mostly been in poor health since then. A new health update video was announced in March, and was being worked on as of August 2026. However, her team announced in October that work on the video was postponed until her condition improves again.
