= Arlene Alda =

American photographer and writer

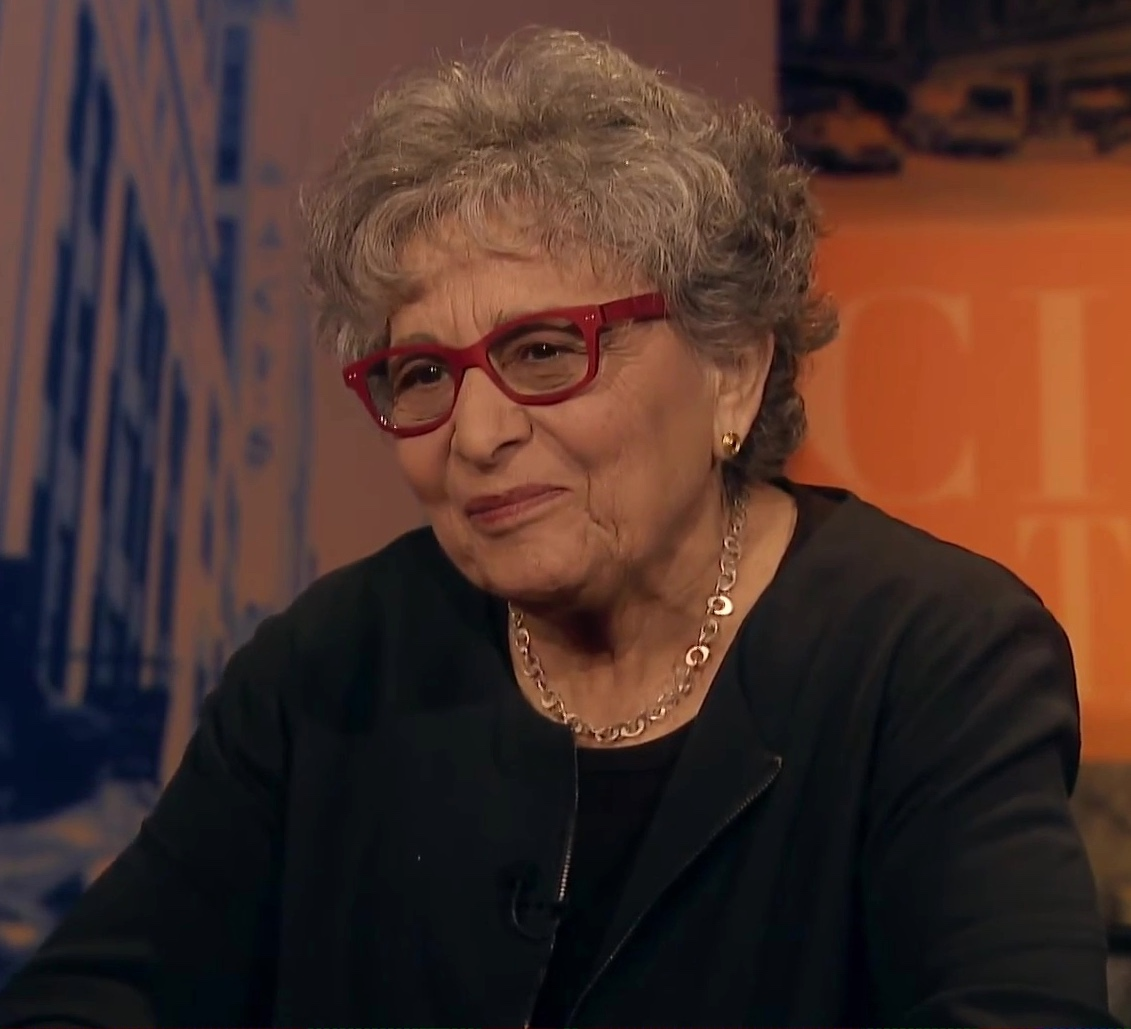
- Alda on CUNY TV's City Talk, 2015
- Born: Arlene Weiss; March 12, 1933 (age 93); New York City, U.S.
- Education: Hunter College
- Occupations: Photographer, writer
- Years active: 1963–present
- Spouse: Alan Alda (m. 1957)
- Children: 3, including Beatrice
- Relatives: Robert Alda (father-in-law)
- Website: arlenealda.com

Arlene Alda (née Weiss; born March 12, 1933) is an American photographer and writer. She began her career playing clarinet professionally, then moved on to photography and writing children's books. She is married to actor Alan Alda.

== Early life ==
Alda was born Arlene Weiss in the Bronx, New York City to Jewish parents. She attended Evander Childs High School and Hunter College, graduating in January 1954 as a music major, Phi Beta Kappa, Cum Laude. She became a member of the National Orchestra, a training orchestra, conducted by Leon Barzin. She studied clarinet with Abraham Goldstein and Leon Russianoff, becoming a member of the Houston Symphony Orchestra, playing assistant first clarinet and bass clarinet under the baton of Leopold Stokowski.

Weiss played first clarinet in the Ridgefield Orchestra. She pursued an early interest in photography by studying with Mort Shapiro and Lou Bernstein, ultimately changing careers and becoming a photographer and writer. As a photographer, Alda had several one-person shows, including those in Nikon House in New York City and the Mark Humphrey Gallery in Southampton, New York. As a freelance photographer, her photographs have appeared in The Saturday Evening Post, Vogue, People Magazine, Life Magazine, and Today's Health Magazine, for which she received a Chicago Graphics Communications Award for her photo essay, "Allison's Tonsillectomy".

== Literary works ==
Alda is the author of 15 children's books, including the best seller, Sheep, Sheep Sheep, Help Me Fall Asleep (Doubleday Books for Young Readers, 1992), Arlene Alda's 1,2,3 (Tricycle Press 1998), which won an American Library Notable citation, The Book of ZZZs (Tundra 2005), Did You Say Pears? (Tundra 2006) and Except the Color Grey (Tundra 2011). She also wrote the popular Hurry Granny Annie (Published by Tricycle Press in 1999) as well as Hold the Bus (Published by Troll Press in 1996), Iris Has a Virus (2008) and Lulu's Piano Lesson (2010). For much, but not all, of her career as an author, she has provided her own photography as illustrations used in her children's books.

She is also represented in photo anthologies, Women of Vision, and Soho Gallery 2. Alda is the author of On Set (Fireside/Simon and Schuster 1981) illustrated with over one hundred of her photographs and The Last Days of Mash (Unicorn, 1983) with photos by Alda and co-written with her husband, Alan Alda. Her most recent book, Just Kids from the Bronx (Henry Holt and Co. March 2015.) an Oral History of 64 interviews with prominent Bronxites. The story tellers include Al Pacino, Regis Philbin, Colin Powell, Neil deGrasse Tyson, Mary Higgins Clark, Avery Corman, Chazz Palminteri, TATS CRU Graffiti Artists, Grandmaster Melle Mel, and the others, from age 93 to age 23.

== Personal life ==
Arlene is married to actor Alan Alda. She met Alda at a dinner party held by mutual friends in 1956, while they were both attending separate colleges. They wed on March 15, 1957, and they have three daughters, Eve (b. 1958), Elizabeth (b. 1960), and Beatrice (b. 1961), as well as eight grandchildren.

== Awards and honors ==
Alda was honored as The New Jewish Home's Eight Over Eighty Gala 2015 honoree.
