= Math-O-Vision =

Math-O-Vision is an applied mathematics movie contest open to students who are legal residents of the 50 United States and the District of Columbia, at least 13 years of age and are registered in high school (grades 9-12) or equivalent home school program at time of entry. Movies are created using a wide variety of techniques, including animation. The contest is sponsored by the William H. Neukom Institute for Computational Science as well as the Dartmouth College Mathematics Department based in Hanover, New Hampshire. The competition awarded a total of $8,500 in prizes in its first year, 2012-13. The contest began in 2012 with approximately 50 movies entered. Inaugural year winners were announced May 15, 2013. The second year of the contest began November 1, 2013 and ended May 15, 2014.

== Contest ==
Teams are challenged to create 4-minute movies which are uploaded online. These movies are to explain the power of mathematics in the world around them in a creative way. This challenge was inspired by the 1959 Disney animated short Donald in MathMagic Land.

Registration is open to high school students in the United States over 13 years of age. There is no cost to register or participate in Math-O-Vision.

The judging process involves an open online voting period and judges. Judges include a wide variety of academics, actors, and animators. They include Alan Alda, Tom Sito, Dan Rockmore, Lorie Loeb, Ge Wang and Steven Strogatz.

Math-O-Vision awards a $4,000 First Prize, $2,000 Second Prize and $1,000 Third Prize. Honorable Mentions are also awarded.
