= Beatrice Alda =

American actress

- Occupations: Actress, filmmaker
- Years active: 1981–present
- Spouse: J Brooke
- Children: 5
- Parents: Alan Alda (father); Arlene Weiss (mother)
- Relatives: Robert Alda (grandfather); Antony Alda (half-uncle)

Beatrice Alda is an American actress, director and producer who appeared in The Four Seasons and Men of Respect.

== Career ==
Alda played Lisa in the 1981 film The Four Seasons, directed by her father, and reprised the role in the 1984 television series of the same name. She played Judy, the daughter of Steve, played by her real life father, in the 1988 film A New Life.

Alda and filmmaker J Brooke co-directed and produced the 2008 documentary film Out Late, which follows the lives of people who came out as gay, lesbian, and transgender while they were senior citizens.

== Personal life ==
Alda is the daughter of actor Alan Alda and author and photographer Arlene Weiss. Beatrice Alda has five children with J Brooke.

== Filmography ==
=== Acting ===
==== Film ====
Year	Work	Role	Ref.
1981	The Four Seasons	Lisa Callan	
1988	A New Life	Judy	
1990	Men of Respect	Susan	

==== Television ====
Year	Work	Role	Ref.
1984	The Four Seasons	Lisa Callan	

=== Filmmaker credits ===
Year	Work	Position	Ref.
2008	Out Late	Co-director, producer	
2016	Legs: a Big Issue in a Small Town	Co-director, producer	
