= List of awards and nominations received by Alan Alda =

Alan Alda awards and nominations
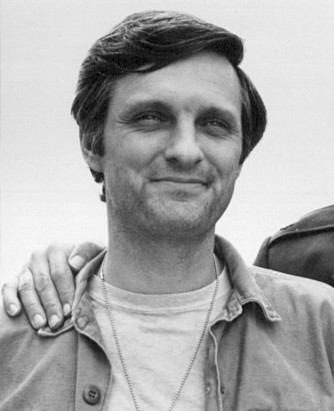
- Alda in M*A*S*H in 1975
Awards and nominations
Award	Wins	Nominations
Academy Awards	0	1
BAFTA Awards	0	2
Golden Globe Awards	6	16
Grammy Awards	0	1
Primetime Emmy Awards	6	34
Screen Actors Guild Awards	0	4
Tony Awards	0	3

Totals (Note: Certain award groups do not simply award one winner. They acknowledge several different recipients, have runners-up, and have third place. Since this is a specific recognition and is different from losing an award, runner-up mentions are considered wins in this award tally. For simplification and to avoid errors, each award in this list has been presumed to have had a prior nomination.)
- Wins: 45
- Nominations: 73

This article is a List of awards and nominations received by Alan Alda.

Alan Alda is an American actor known for his roles on stage and screen. He has received numerous accolades including six Primetime Emmy Awards and six Golden Globe Awards as well as nominations for an Academy Award, two BAFTA Awards, a Grammy Award, and three Tony Awards. He was inducted in the Television Hall of Fame in 1994, and received the Screen Actors Guild Life Achievement Award in 2018.

For his role as Capt. Benjamin Franklin "Hawkeye" Pierce in the CBS sitcom M*A*S*H (1972–1983) he received two Primetime Emmy Awards for Outstanding Lead Actor in a Comedy Series out of eleven nominations. He also won Primetime Emmy Awards for Outstanding Writing in a Comedy Series and Outstanding Directing in a Comedy Series for M*A*S*H. He won the Primetime Emmy Award for Outstanding Supporting Actor in a Drama Series for his role as Senator Arnold Vinick in Aaron Sorkin's NBC political drama The West Wing in 2005.

For his comedic role as a pompous TV producer Lester in Woody Allen's comedy-drama Crimes and Misdemeanors (1989) he received the New York Critics Circle, and the National Board of Review Awards for Best Supporting Actor as well as a nomination for the BAFTA Award for Best Supporting Actor. He portrayed Owen Brewster in Martin Scorsese's biographical film The Aviator (2004) earning a nomination for the Academy Award for Best Supporting Actor.

He is known for his roles on Broadway receiving Tony Award nominations for his performances in the musical The Apple Tree (1967), the Neil Simon play Jake's Women (1992), and the David Mamet play Glengarry Glen Ross (2005).

== Major associations ==
=== Academy Awards ===
Year	Category	Nominated work	Result	Ref.
2005	Best Supporting Actor	The Aviator	Nominated	

=== Actor Awards ===
Year	Category	Nominated work	Result	Ref.
2002	Outstanding Actor in a Miniseries or Television Movie	Club Land	Nominated	
2005	Outstanding Cast in a Motion Picture	The Aviator	Nominated	
2006	Outstanding Ensemble in a Drama Series	The West Wing	Nominated	
2006	Outstanding Actor in a Drama Series	The West Wing	Nominated	
2019	Screen Actors Guild Life Achievement Award	—N/a	Honored	

=== BAFTA Awards ===
Year	Category	Nominated work	Result	Ref.
1991	Best Actor in a Supporting Role	Crimes and Misdemeanors	Nominated	
2005	Best Actor in a Supporting Role	The Aviator	Nominated	

=== Emmy Awards ===
Year	Category	Nominated work	Result	Ref.
Primetime Emmy Awards
1973	Outstanding Lead Actor in a Comedy Series	M*A*S*H	Nominated	
1974	Outstanding Lead Actor in a Comedy Series	M*A*S*H	Won	
1974	Actor of the Year – Series	M*A*S*H	Won	
1974	Best Lead Actor in a Drama	6 Rms Riv Vu	Nominated	
1975	Outstanding Lead Actor in a Comedy Series	M*A*S*H	Nominated	
1975	Outstanding Directing for a Comedy Series	M*A*S*H (for episode "Bulletin Board")	Nominated	
1976	Outstanding Lead Actor in a Comedy Series	M*A*S*H	Nominated	
1976	Outstanding Directing for a Comedy Series	M*A*S*H (for episode "The Kids")	Nominated	
1977	Outstanding Lead Actor in a Comedy Series	M*A*S*H	Nominated	
1977	Outstanding Directing for a Comedy Series	M*A*S*H (for episode "Dear Sigmund")	Won	
1977	Outstanding Writing for a Comedy Series	M*A*S*H (for episode "Bulletin Board")	Nominated	
1978	Outstanding Lead Actor in a Comedy Series	M*A*S*H	Nominated	
1978	Outstanding Directing for a Comedy Series	M*A*S*H (for episode "Comrades in Arms, Part I")	Nominated	
1978	Outstanding Writing for a Comedy Series	M*A*S*H (for episode "Fallen Idol")	Nominated	
1978	Outstanding Lead Actor in a Drama or Comedy Special	Kill Me if You Can	Nominated	
1979	Outstanding Lead Actor in a Comedy Series	M*A*S*H	Nominated	
1979	Outstanding Directing for a Comedy Series	M*A*S*H (for episode "Dear Sis")	Nominated	
1979	Outstanding Writing for a Comedy Series	M*A*S*H (for episode "Inga")	Won	
1980	Outstanding Lead Actor in a Comedy Series	M*A*S*H	Nominated	
1980	Outstanding Directing for a Comedy Series	M*A*S*H (for episode "Dreams")	Nominated	
1981	Outstanding Lead Actor in a Comedy Series	M*A*S*H	Nominated	
1981	Outstanding Directing for a Comedy Series	M*A*S*H (for episode "The Life You Save")	Nominated	
1982	Outstanding Lead Actor in a Comedy Series	M*A*S*H (for episode "Where There's a Will, There's a War")	Won	
1982	Outstanding Directing for a Comedy Series	M*A*S*H (for episode "Where There's a Will, There's a War")	Nominated	
1982	Outstanding Writing for a Comedy Series	M*A*S*H (for episode "Follies of the Living – Concerns of the Dead")	Nominated	
1983	Outstanding Lead Actor in a Comedy Series	M*A*S*H	Nominated	
1983	Outstanding Directing for a Comedy Series	M*A*S*H (for episode "Goodbye, Farewell, and Amen")	Nominated	
1994	Outstanding Supporting Actor in a Miniseries or Special	And the Band Played On	Nominated	
2000	Outstanding Guest Actor in a Drama Series	ER	Nominated	
2001	Outstanding Supporting Actor in a Miniseries or Movie	Club Land	Nominated	
2005	Outstanding Supporting Actor in a Drama Series	The West Wing (for episodes "King Corn" and "In God We Trust")	Nominated	
2006	Outstanding Supporting Actor in a Drama Series	The West Wing (for episodes "Two Weeks Out" and "The Last Hurrah")	Won	
2009	Outstanding Guest Actor in a Comedy Series	30 Rock	Nominated	
2015	Outstanding Guest Actor in a Drama Series	The Blacklist (for episode "The Decembrist")	Nominated	

=== Golden Globe Award ===
Year	Category	Nominated work	Result	Ref.
1969	New Star of the Year – Actor	Paper Lion	Nominated	
1973	Best Actor – Television Series Musical or Comedy	M*A*S*H	Nominated	
1974	Best Actor – Television Series Musical or Comedy	M*A*S*H	Nominated	
1975	Best Actor – Television Series Musical or Comedy	M*A*S*H	Nominated	
1976	Best Actor – Television Series Musical or Comedy	M*A*S*H	Won	
1977	Best Actor – Television Series Musical or Comedy	M*A*S*H	Won	
1978	Best Actor – Television Series Musical or Comedy	M*A*S*H	Nominated	
1979	Best Actor – Television Series Musical or Comedy	M*A*S*H	Nominated	
1979	Best Actor in a Motion Picture – Musical or Comedy	Same Time, Next Year	Nominated	
1980	Best Actor – Television Series Musical or Comedy	M*A*S*H	Won	
1981	Best Actor – Television Series Musical or Comedy	M*A*S*H	Won	
1982	Best Actor – Television Series Musical or Comedy	M*A*S*H	Won	
1982	Best Actor in a Motion Picture – Musical or Comedy	The Four Seasons	Nominated	
1982	Best Screenplay – Motion Picture	The Four Seasons	Nominated	
1983	Best Actor – Television Series Musical or Comedy	M*A*S*H	Won	
1995	Best Actor – Miniseries or Television Film	White Mile	Nominated	

=== Grammy Awards ===
Year	Category	Nominated work	Result	Ref.
2008	Spoken Word Album	Things I Overheard While Talking to Myself	Nominated	

=== Tony Awards ===
Year	Category	Nominated work	Result	Ref.
1967	Best Actor in a Musical	The Apple Tree	Nominated	
1992	Best Actor in a Play	Jake's Women	Nominated	
2005	Best Featured Actor in a Play	Glengarry Glen Ross	Nominated	
2024	Best Revival of a Play	Purlie Victorious	Nominated	

== Other awards ==
=== Drama Desk Award ===
Year	Category	Nominated work	Result	Ref.
2005	Outstanding Ensemble Performance	Glengarry Glen Ross	Won	

=== Directors Guild of America Award ===
Year	Category	Nominated work	Result	Ref.
1977	Outstanding Directorial – Comedy Series	M*A*S*H: "Dear Sigmund"	Won	
1982	Outstanding Directorial – Comedy Series	M*A*S*H: "The Life You Save"	Won	
1983	Outstanding Directorial – Comedy Series	M*A*S*H: "Where There's a Will, There's a War"	Won	

=== National Board of Review ===
Year	Category	Nominated work	Result	Ref.
1989	Best Supporting Actor	Crimes and Misdemeanors	Won	

=== New York Film Critics Circle ===
Year	Category	Nominated work	Result	Ref.
1989	Best Supporting Actor	Crimes and Misdemeanors	Won	

== Honorary awards ==
- Induction into the Television Hall of Fame in 1994
- Inducted into the New Jersey Hall of Fame in 2014
- 2019 Distinguished Service Award from the National Association of Broadcasters
- 2021 Fellow of the American Association for the Advancement of Science (AAAS) – Section on General Interest in Science and Engineering

== Honorary degrees ==
Alan Alda has been awarded several honorary degrees in recognition of his acting career and promotion of educational initiatives. These include:

Location	Date	School	Degree	Ref.
New Jersey	1974	Saint Peter's University	Doctorate	
New York	1978	Fordham University	Doctorate	
New Jersey	1979	Drew University	Doctorate	
Connecticut	1983	Wesleyan University	Doctor of Fine Arts (DFA)	
New York	2004	Long Island University	Doctor of Letters (D.Litt.)	
Pennsylvania	May 17, 2015	Carnegie Mellon University	Doctor of Fine Arts (DFA)	
Scotland	21 June 2017	University of Dundee	Doctor of Laws (LL.D.)	
New York	May 2019	Stony Brook University	Doctor of Fine Arts (DFA)	
