= Jocelyn Monroe =

American experimental particle physicist

Jocelyn Rebecca Monroe
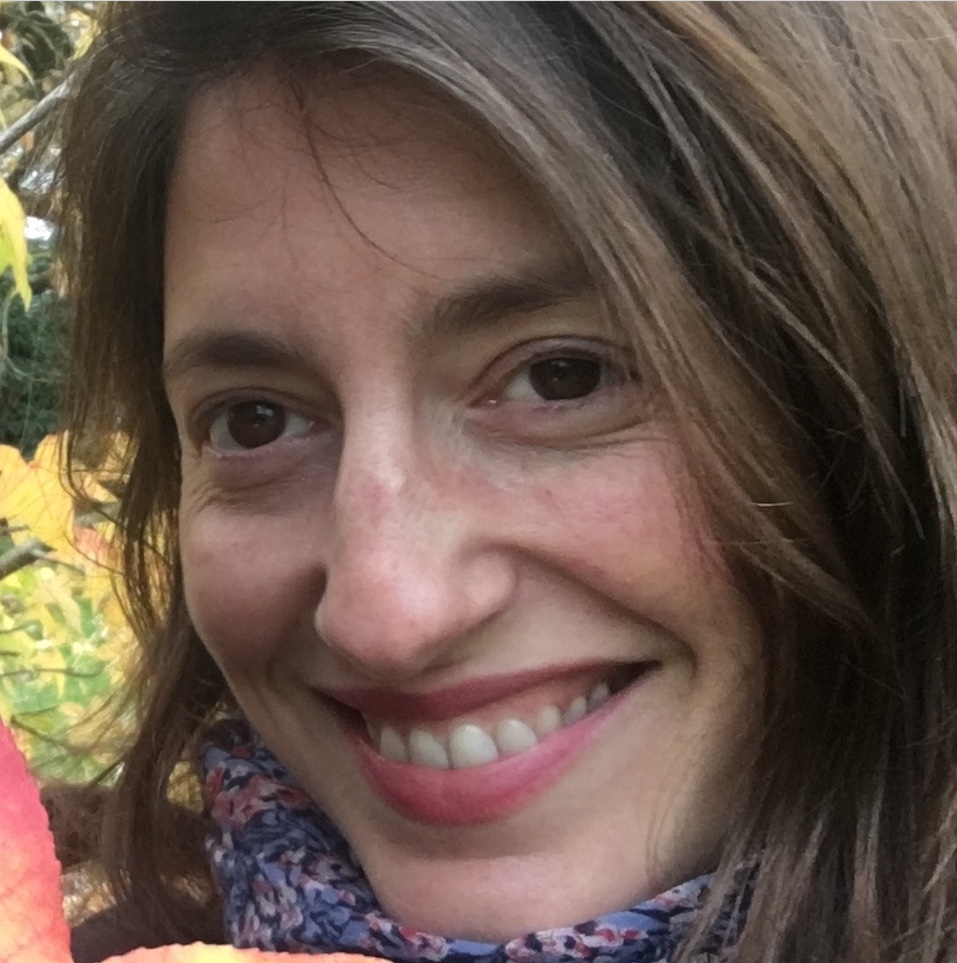
- Education: Columbia University (BSc, PhD)
- Scientific career
- Workplaces: University of Oxford; Royal Holloway, University of London; Massachusetts Institute of Technology; Columbia University
- Thesis: A Combined ν_{µ} and ν_{e} Oscillation Search at MiniBooNE (2006)
- Website: Dark Matter Research Group

Jocelyn Monroe is an American British experimental particle physicist who is a professor at the University of Oxford. Her research considers the development of novel detectors as part of the search for dark matter. In 2016 she was honoured with the Breakthrough Prize in Fundamental Physics for her work on the Sudbury Neutrino Observatory.

== Early life and education ==
Monroe is from Chicago. She studied physics at Columbia University, where she completed a bachelor's degree in astrophysics in 1999. After graduating she joined the Fermi National Accelerator Laboratory (Fermilab) as an engineering physicist in the neutrino factory. In the neutrino factory, Monroe worked on muon beam cooling. After one year at Fermilab, Monroe returned to Columbia University, where she joined the Booster Neutrino Experiment (MiniBooNE) neutrino experiment and completed a doctorate under the supervision of Michael Shaevitz. She was part of the team who confirmed that there were three types of neutrinos, and that the Standard Model was still in effect.

== Research and career ==
After earning her doctorate Monroe was made Pappalardo Fellow at the Massachusetts Institute of Technology (MIT), and was promoted to Assistant Professor soon after. At MIT, Monroe joined the Sudbury Neutrino Observatory where she looked for exotic particles in solar neutrino oscillations. After completing her postdoctoral research, Monroe joined the MiniCLEAN and Dark Matter Time Projection Chamber (DMTPC) experiments to detect dark matter particle interactions. Whilst at MIT she taught physics to Dianna Cowern.

In 2011 Monroe moved to the United Kingdom, where she joined Royal Holloway, University of London. Here she founded the Dark Matter research group, in which she specialises in the direct detection of dark matter. Direct detection means that experiments record dark matter particles scattering off atomic nuclei. She has worked with the DEAP-3600 (Dark matter Experiment using Argon Pulse-shape discrimination) at SNOLAB and is now the deputy Spokesperson (scientific leader) of the DarkSide-20k experiment in the Laboratori Nazionali del Gran Sasso. DarkSide-20k is proposed to be the world's largest dark matter detector, and will use silicon-based detectors to look for the light emitted by dark matter interactions with argon. Monroe leads the dark matter search on QUEST-DMC, a novel experiment using superfluid Helium-3 to search for dark matter which was featured in the 2024 Royal Society Summer Science Exhibition.

As part of her work on dark matter detectors, Monroe works on new strategies to detect the dark matter wind. As planet Earth moves through dark matter in the galaxy it should create a wind of dark matter particles that can be easily differentiated from the terrestrial background. She has developed tetrafluoromethane-based detectors(DMTPC) with silicon readout for the first demonstration of particle tracking in the low-energy regime relevant for dark matter and geo-neutrino searches. Ultimately Monroe looks to develop a kilotonne observatory for dark matter and neutrino physics. Such an observatory could observe the geoneutrinos created by potassium decay in the Earth's core.

In 2013 Monroe became the first woman appointed Professor of Physics at Royal Holloway, University of London. In 2023 Monroe was appointed Professor of Physics at the University of Oxford.

== Awards and honours ==
- 2006 MIT Pappalardo Fellowship
- 2009 Kavli Frontiers of Science Fellow
- 2016 Breakthrough Prize in Fundamental Physics

== Select publications ==
- MiniBooNE Collaboration; Aguilar-Arevalo, A. A.; Anderson, C. E.; Bazarko, A. O.; Brice, S. J.; Brown, B. C.; Bugel, L.; Cao, J.; Coney, L.; Conrad, J. M.; Cox, D. C. (2009-03-11). "Unexplained Excess of Electronlike Events from a 1-GeV Neutrino Beam". Physical Review Letters. 102 (10) 101802. arXiv:0812.2243. Bibcode:2009PhRvL.102j1802A. doi:10.1103/PhysRevLett.102.101802. hdl:1721.1/54759. PMID 19392103. S2CID 3067551.
- SNO Collaboration; Aharmim, B; Ahmed, SN; Anthony, AE; Barros, N; Beier, EW; Bellerive, A; Beltran, B; Bergevin, M; Biller, SD; Boudjemline, K (2013-08-01). "Combined analysis of all three phases of solar neutrino data from the Sudbury Neutrino Observatory". Physical Review C. 88 (2) 025501. arXiv:1109.0763. Bibcode:2013PhRvC..88b5501A. doi:10.1103/PhysRevC.88.025501. hdl:1721.1/81363. S2CID 90126.
- SNO Collaboration; Aharmim, B.; Ahmed, S. N.; Anthony, A. E.; Barros, N.; Beier, E. W.; Bellerive, A.; Beltran, B.; Bergevin, M.; Biller, S. D.; Boudjemline, K. (2010-05-27). "Low-energy-threshold analysis of the Phase I and Phase II data sets of the Sudbury Neutrino Observatory". Physical Review C. 81 (5) 055504. arXiv:0910.2984. Bibcode:2010PhRvC..81e5504A. doi:10.1103/PhysRevC.81.055504. hdl:1721.1/57490. S2CID 118682047.

== Personal life ==
Monroe is married to Morgan Wascko, Professor of Physics at University of Oxford. Together they have two daughters.

== See also ==
- Daphne Jackson, from Peterborough, the UK's first female professor of physics (University of Surrey at age 34)
- Gillian Gehring (née Murray), from Nottingham, the UK's second female professor of physics
