= Antony Alda =

American actor (1956–2009)

- Born: Antonio Joseph D'Abruzzo; December 9, 1956; Saint-Julien, Var, France
- Died: July 3, 2009 (aged 52); Los Angeles, California, US
- Education: Juilliard School
- Occupation: Actor
- Years active: 1965–2004
- Spouses: Leslie Clark (m. 1975; div. 1977) Lori Carrell (m. 1981; div. 1992)
- Children: 2
- Parent(s): Robert Alda; Flora Marino
- Relatives: Alan Alda (paternal half-brother); Beatrice Alda (niece); Elizabeth Alda (niece)

Antony Alda (born Antonio Joseph D'Abruzzo; December 9, 1956 – July 3, 2009), sometimes called Tony, was an American actor who grew up in a popular acting family. The son of Robert Alda and younger half brother of Alan Alda, his early studies were in Rome and he finished at The Juilliard School in New York City. He appeared on stage, in film, and on television. His career culminated in writing, directing, and performing in Role of a Lifetime.

== Early life ==
Alda was born Antonio Joseph D'Abruzzo in Saint-Julien, Var, France, into what would later be called an acting dynasty. His father was well known in the United States both in film and on Broadway, where he earned a Tony. Alda's mother, Flora Marino, was an Italian actress. His half-brother is Alan Alda.

About growing up within the dynasty, Antony once explained, "The theater has always been a comfortable place for me. I spent all my summers on Broadway. Dad would be in one play and Alan would be in another. I used to hang out with the lighting guys." He found that being an Alda had its professional ups and downs. "People figure you know what you're doing because you grew up around acting. Other people think you got the part because of your name."

Antony Alda finished his high school studies at Notre-Dame International High School (NDIHS) in Verneuil-sur-Seine, a residential area west of Paris, France and completed his academic career studying musical composition at The Juilliard School in New York City. He was married twice, first in 1975 to Leslie Clark at Saint Thomas Episcopal Church in New York City at Fifth Avenue. Their reception was held at the old Biltmore Hotel. The marriage lasted until 1977. His sons were born during his marriage to actress Lori Carrell, to whom he was married from 1981 to 1992. During this time his mother commented, "Marriage was good for Tony. It changed him and made him more mature."

== Career ==
Throughout his career, Alda played in seven films, including the Oscar-winning Melvin and Howard, Homeboy, Hot Child in the City, and two TV "shorts" including Bungle Abbey. He was cast in several television series and appeared in more than 200 episodes including two on Knots Landing as Rick Elliot.

In 1980, he was cast along with Robert Alda in an episode of M*A*S*H. Alan Alda, the show's lead actor, co-wrote and directed episode 20 of season 8, "Lend A Hand". Antony Alda played a medic at a front-line aid station, urging two visiting surgeons, Robert and Alan Alda, to stop bickering and focus on a critically wounded patient.

Alda later played Johnny Corelli during two years (1990–1991) on NBC's Days of Our Lives.

Like Johnny Corelli, Alda saw himself as something of a jokester. He said, "I always played practical jokes on people." One prank involved his donning a wig and passing himself off as one of his mother's church friends to a visiting aunt.

=== Role of a Lifetime ===
His most notable accomplishment is the film Role of a Lifetime released in 2001. Alda wrote, directed, and acted in the film, which is about a formerly successful actor, Bobby. Bobby seems to be egotistical at first, but is soon rendered a sympathetic persona by the starring actor, Scott Bakula. Bobby has lost his wife in the Hollywood rat race and is on his way to becoming a "has-been". He has an accident that results in a disappearance long enough for Hollywood to assume he is dead and to begin to cast a movie based on his life. Bobby takes on a different identity, that of Texan Buck Steele, in order to audition for and, eventually, play himself in the movie. In the persona of Buck Steele, Bobby interacts with his ex-wife, his best friend and a mysterious old Hispanic gentleman. These experiences, while disturbing, enable Bobby to re-examine many aspects of his life. (Alda both credited and quoted Socrates in the film; he inconspicuously placed Socrates' quote "An unexamined life is not worth living" in several scenes.)

== Death ==
Antony died in Los Angeles from cirrhosis on July 3, 2009, aged 52.

== Filmography ==
=== Film ===
Year	Title	Role	Notes
1970	Three Coins in the Fountain	Gino	TV movie
1978	Nowhere to Run	Neft	TV movie
1978	Fame	Italian Street Cop	TV movie
1980	Melvin and Howard	Terry	
1986	Smart Alec	Rodney	
1986	Sweet Liberty	Film Crew Member	
1987	Hot Child in the City	Charon	
1988	Homeboy	Ray	
1991	Driving Me Crazy	Jack	
1993	Killing Device	Kyle	
2002	Role of a Lifetime	Joey	As "Tony Alda". Also Director and writer.
2004	National Treasure	Guard Ferguson	(final film role)

=== Television ===
Year	Title	Role	Notes
1968	Daniel Boone	Rudi	1 Episode: "Orlando, the Prophet" Credited as "Anthony Alda"
1968	Walt Disney's Wonderful World of Color	Gus	2 episodes: "The Treasure of San Bosco Reef: Part 1" "The Treasure of San Bosco Reef: Part 2"
1976	Switch	Terry	1 Episode: "The Pirates of Tin Pan Alley"
1978	Columbo	Mario	1 Episode: Murder Under Glass
1980	M*A*S*H	Corporal Jarvis	1 Episode: "Lend a Hand"
1981	Bungle Abbey		TV Short
1981	Homeroom	Crazy Willie	TV Short
1981	CHiPs	Robby Burstad	TV series; 1 Episode: "The Killer Indy"
1983	Quincy, M.E.	Paramedic #1	TV series; 1 Episode: "Women of Valor"
1985	Knots Landing	Rick Elliot	2 episodes: "Rise and Fall", "A Question of Trust"
1986	Throb	Zeus	TV series; 1 Episode: "Pilot"
1986	Too Close for Comfort	Derrick Bond	TV series; 1 Episode: "Rock Around Henry"
1987	Hunter	Dino	TV series; 1 Episode: "Double Exposure"
1990–1991	Days of Our Lives	Giovanni 'Johnny' Corelli	TV series
1993	Renegade	Barry Mellman	TV series; 1 Episode: "The Rabbit and the Fox"

== As writer ==
Year	Title	Role	Notes
2002	Role of a Lifetime	Joey	

== As director ==
Year	Title	Role	Notes
2002	Role of a Lifetime	Joey	
