= Alan Alda =

American actor (born 1936)

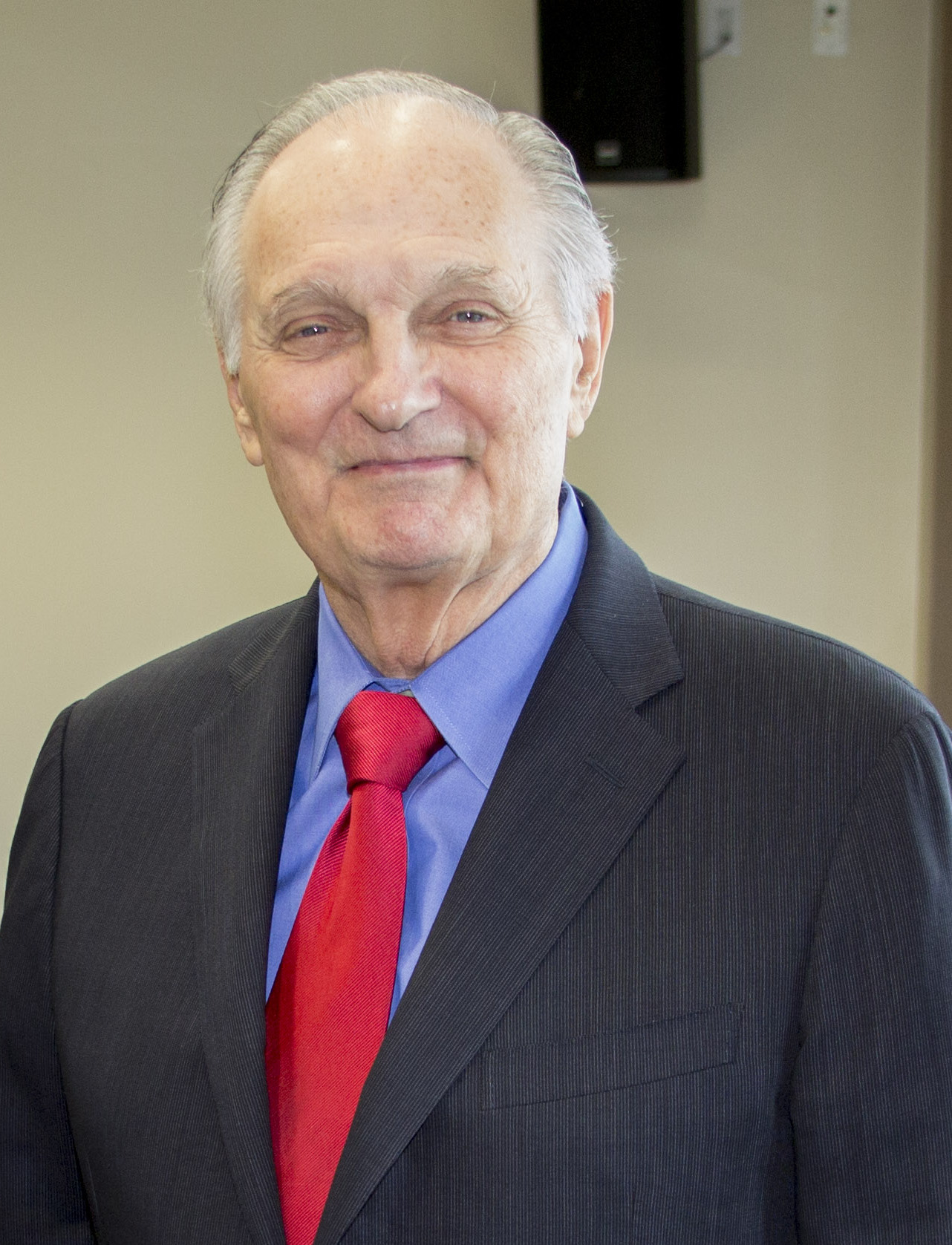
- Alda in 2015
- Born: Alphonso Joseph D'Abruzzo; January 28, 1936 (age 90); New York City, U.S.
- Education: Fordham University (BA)
- Occupations: Actor; comedian; director; screenwriter
- Years active: 1955–present
- Spouse: Arlene Alda (m. 1957)
- Children: 3, including Beatrice
- Father: Robert Alda
- Relatives: Antony Alda (half-brother)
- Awards: Full list

Alphonso Joseph D'Abruzzo (born January 28, 1936), known professionally as Alan Alda (/ˈɑːldə/), is an American actor and filmmaker. In a career spanning seven decades on both stage and screen, he is best known for portraying Captain Benjamin Franklin "Hawkeye" Pierce in the CBS wartime comedy drama M*A*S*H (1972–1983), where he also wrote and directed numerous episodes of the series. His accolades include six Emmy Awards and six Golden Globe Awards, as well as nominations for an Academy Award, two BAFTA Awards, a Grammy Award, and four Tony Awards.

After starring in the films Same Time, Next Year (1978), California Suite (1978), and The Seduction of Joe Tynan (1979), Alda made his directorial debut with The Four Seasons (1981). Alda was nominated for the Academy Award for Best Supporting Actor for his portrayal of Owen Brewster in Martin Scorsese's The Aviator (2004). Other notable film roles include Crimes and Misdemeanors (1989), Manhattan Murder Mystery (1993), Everyone Says I Love You (1996), Flirting with Disaster (1996), Tower Heist (2011), Bridge of Spies (2015), and Marriage Story (2019).

Alda won the Primetime Emmy Award for Outstanding Supporting Actor in a Drama Series for his role as Senator Arnold Vinick in the NBC series The West Wing. Other Emmy-nominated roles include in And the Band Played On in 1993, ER in 2000, 30 Rock in 2009, and The Blacklist in 2015. He also had recurring roles in The Big C (2011–2013), Horace and Pete (2016), Ray Donovan (2018–2020), and The Good Fight (2018–2019).

Alda is also known for his roles on Broadway, acting in Purlie Victorious (1961) and receiving three Tony Award nominations for his performances in The Apple Tree (1967), Jake's Women (1992), and Glengarry Glen Ross (2005). In 2008 he received a Grammy Award for Best Audio Book, Narration & Storytelling Recording nomination for Things I Overheard While Talking to Myself. In 2019, Alda received the Screen Actors Guild Life Achievement Award. He hosts the podcast Clear+Vivid with Alan Alda and previously hosted Science Clear+Vivid.

== Early life and education ==
Alda was born Alphonso Joseph D'Abruzzo on January 28, 1936, in Manhattan, to Robert Alda (born Alfonso Giuseppe Giovanni Roberto D'Abruzzo), an actor and singer of Italian descent, and Joan Browne, a homemaker and former beauty-pageant winner of Irish descent. His father created the stage name Alda by combining the first two letters of his first and last names. Alan spent his childhood traveling around the United States with his parents, in support of his father's job as a performer; he performed with his father in the less-risqué burlesque sketches. His mother was diagnosed with schizophrenia and, according to Alan, tried to stab his father when Alan was six. In the same interview he said that his mother taught him to improvise, an important skill of his: he had to learn how to react to the state she was in, for his own safety.

When Alda was seven, he contracted polio. To combat the disease, his parents administered a painful treatment regimen developed by Elizabeth Kenny, consisting of applying hot woollen blankets to his limbs and stretching his muscles. Alda attended Archbishop Stepinac High School in White Plains, New York. He studied English at Fordham University in the Bronx, where he was a student staff member of its FM radio station, WFUV. During his junior year, he studied in Paris, acted in a play in Rome, and performed with his father on television in Amsterdam.

In 1956, Alda received his Bachelor of Arts degree. A member of the ROTC, he entered the United States Army Reserve and served for six months at Fort Benning. Despite some erroneous reports on military sites that Alda then served in Korea, he has repeatedly said he did not serve there, instead following up active duty of six months at Fort Benning with a time in the reserves in New York City. In a 2013 interview, he joked that he was in charge of a mess tent.

Alda's half-brother, Antony Alda, was born in 1956 and also became an actor.

== Career ==
=== 1958–1971: Broadway debut and early work ===
Alda began his career in the 1950s as a member of the Compass Players, an improvisational comedy revue directed by Paul Sills. He later joined the improvisational group Second City in Chicago. He joined the acting company at the Cleveland Play House during their 1958–1959 season as part of a grant from the Ford Foundation, appearing in productions such as To Dorothy, a Son, Heaven Come Wednesday, Monique and Job. In 1958, he appeared as Carlyle Thompson III on The Phil Silvers Show in the episode titled "Bilko the Art Lover".

Alda portrayed Charlie Cotchipee in the 1961 Ossie Davis play Purlie Victorious on Broadway. In the November 1964 world premiere at the August Wilson Theatre of the stage version of The Owl and The Pussycat, he played Felix the Owl, opposite Doris the Pussycat played by actress/singer Diana Sands, an African-American actress; their onstage kiss prompted hate mail. He continued to play Felix the Owl for the 1964–65 Broadway season. In 1966, he starred in the musical The Apple Tree on Broadway with Barbara Harris, and was nominated for the Tony Award for Best Actor in a Musical for the role. Alda said he became a Mainer in 1957 when he played at the Kennebunkport Playhouse.

Alda was part of the cast, along with David Frost, Henry Morgan and Buck Henry, of the American television version of That Was the Week That Was, which ran as a series from January 10, 1964, to May 1965. He made his Hollywood acting debut as a supporting player in Gone Are the Days!, a film version of the Broadway play Purlie Victorious, which co-starred Ruby Dee and her husband, Ossie Davis. Other film roles followed, such as his portrayal of author, humorist and actor George Plimpton in the film Paper Lion (1968), as well as The Extraordinary Seaman (1969), and the occult-murder-suspense thriller The Mephisto Waltz with actresses Jacqueline Bisset and Barbara Parkins. During this time, Alda frequently appeared as a game show panelist on the 1968 revival of What's My Line?, and on I've Got a Secret during its 1972 syndication revival. Alda wrote several of the stories and poems featured in Marlo Thomas' television show Free to Be... You and Me.

=== 1972–1983: M*A*S*H and acclaim ===
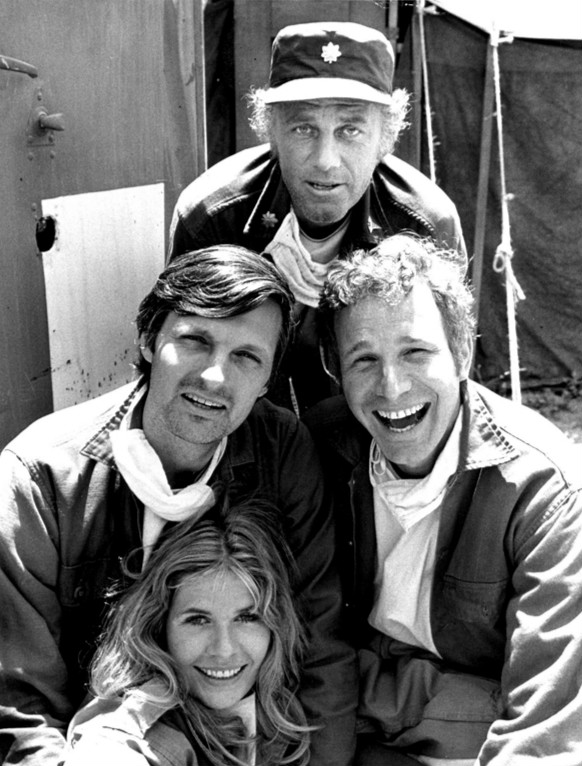
Alda (left of center) as Hawkeye Pierce in M*A*S*H, 1972

In early 1972, Alda was selected to play Hawkeye Pierce in the television adaptation of the 1970 film M*A*S*H. He was nominated for twenty-one Emmy Awards, and won five. He took part in writing nineteen episodes, including the 1983 2.5-hour series finale "Goodbye, Farewell and Amen", which was also the 32nd episode he directed. Alda was the only series regular to appear in all 256 episodes.

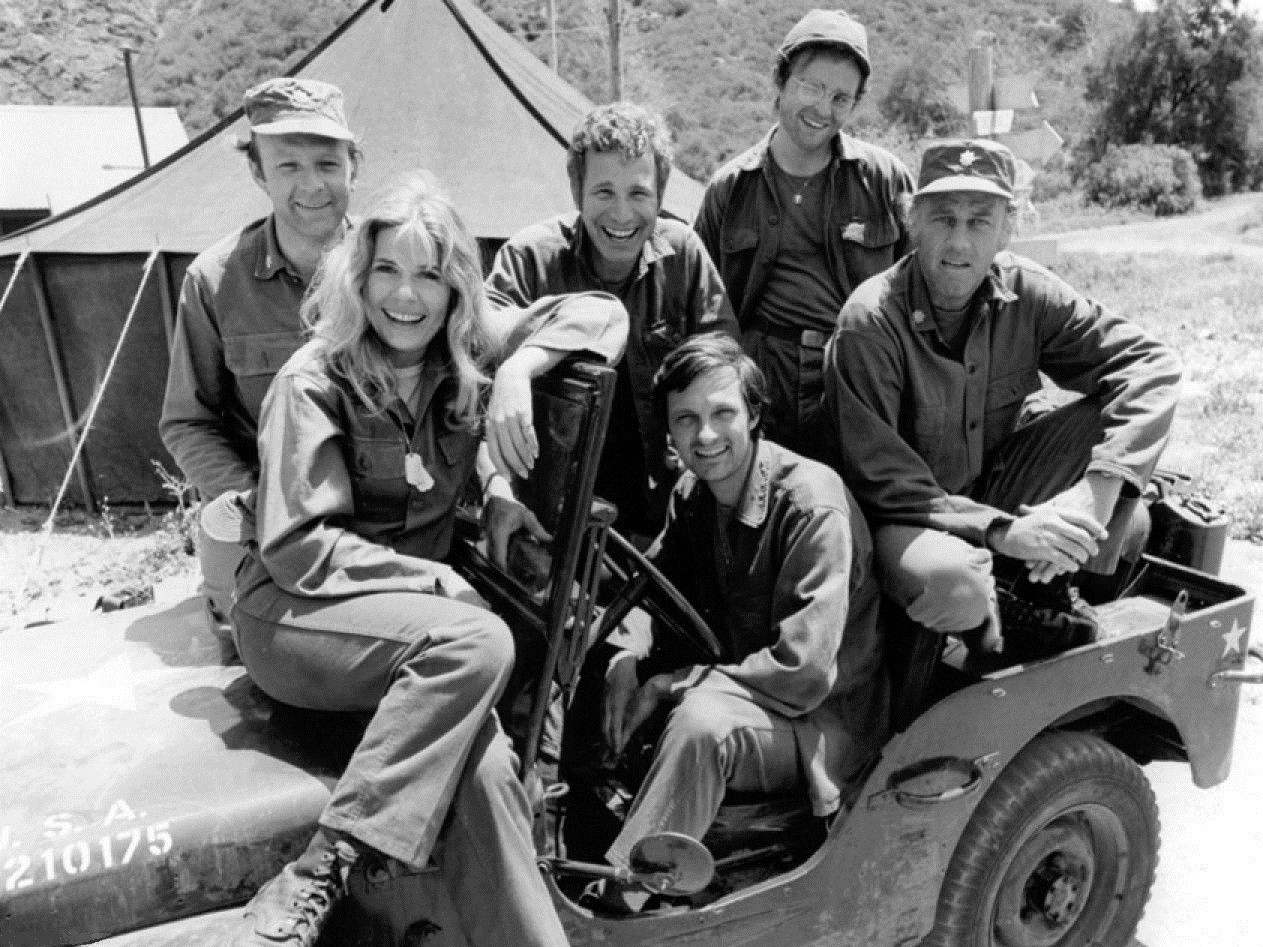
The cast of M*A*S*H in a pre-production photo from the third season, Malibu, California, 1974 (clockwise from left): Loretta Swit, Larry Linville, Wayne Rogers, Gary Burghoff, McLean Stevenson, and Alda

Alda commuted from Los Angeles to his home in New Jersey every weekend for eleven years while starring in M*A*S*H. His wife and daughters lived in New Jersey and he did not want to move his family to Los Angeles, initially because he did not know how long the show would last.

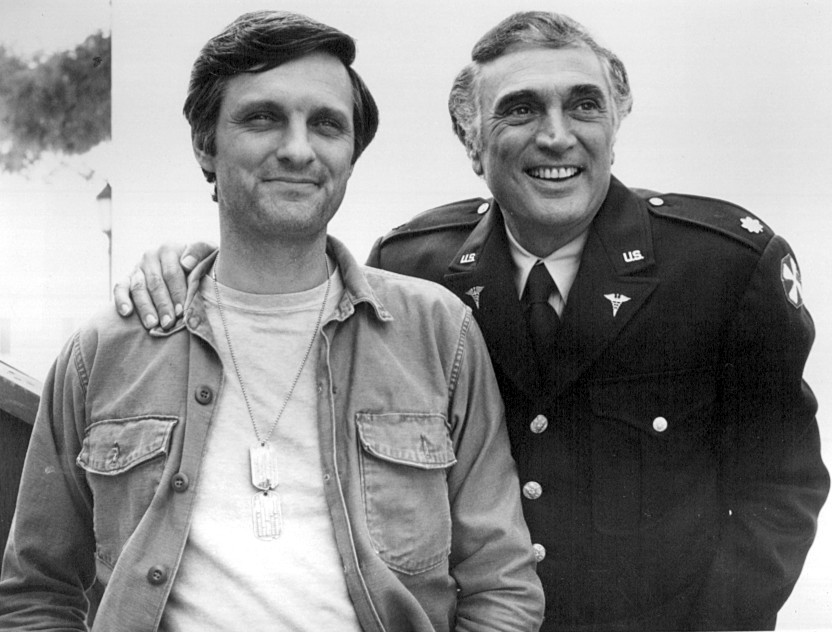
Alan and Robert Alda in 1975

During the series' first five seasons, its tone was largely that of a traditional "service comedy" in the vein of shows such as McHale's Navy. As the original writers gradually left the show, Alda gained increasing control, and by the final seasons had become a producer and creative consultant. Under his watch, M*A*S*H retained its comedic foundation, but gradually assumed a more serious tone, openly addressing political and social issues of the 1970s. As a result, the eleven years of M*A*S*H are generally split into two eras: the Larry Gelbart/Gene Reynolds "comedy" years (1972–1977), and the Alan Alda "dramatic" years (1977–1983). Alda disagreed with this assessment. In a 2016 interview he said: "I don't like to write political messages. I don't like plays that have political messages. I do not think I am responsible for that".

Alda and his co-stars Wayne Rogers and McLean Stevenson worked well together during the first three seasons, but over time, tensions developed as Alda's role grew in popularity and disrupted their characters' original "equal" standing. Rogers and Stevenson left the show at the end of the third season. Anticipating the fourth season, Alda and the producers sought a replacement for the surrogate parent role embodied in the character of Colonel Blake. Veteran actor Harry Morgan, who was a fan of the series and had previously appeared in it, joined the cast as Colonel Sherman T. Potter and carried on as one of the show's lead protagonists. Mike Farrell was introduced as Hawkeye's new tentmate B.J. Hunnicutt. Alda's father, Robert Alda, and half-brother, Antony Alda, appeared together in the 20th episode of season eight of M*A*S*H, "Lend a Hand". Robert had previously appeared in "The Consultant" in season three.

By 1981, Alda was the highest-paid person on a television show with a contract paying him $225,000 an episode ($5.4 million per season).

In his 1981 autobiography, Jackie Cooper, who directed several early M*A*S*H episodes, wrote that Alda concealed a lot of hostility, and that the two of them barely spoke by the end of Cooper's tenure.

During his M*A*S*H years, Alda made several game-show appearances, most notably on The $10,000 Pyramid, and as a frequent panelist on What's My Line? and To Tell the Truth. He also starred in films including the 1978 comedy films Same Time, Next Year and California Suite, and wrote and starred in the title role of the 1979 political drama film The Seduction of Joe Tynan. His favorite episodes of M*A*S*H are "Dear Sigmund" and "In Love and War". In 1996, Alda was ranked 41st on TV Guide's 50 Greatest TV Stars of All Time.

==== Writing and directing credits ====
List of M*A*S*H episodes written and/or directed by Alan Alda
Season	Episode	Credit
One	Episode 19: "The Long John Flap"	Written
Two	Episode 5: "Dr. Pierce and Mr. Hyde"	Written with Robert Klane
Two	Episode 23: "Mail Call"	Directed
Three	Episode 16: "Bulletin Board"	Directed
Four	Episode 4: "The Late Captain Pierce"	Directed
Four	Episode 7: "Dear Mildred"	Directed
Four	Episode 8: "The Kids"	Directed
Four	Episode 16: "Dear Ma"	Directed
Five	Episode 2: "Margaret's Engagement"	Directed
Five	Episode 7: "Dear Sigmund"	Written and directed
Five	Episode 12: "Exorcism"	Directed
Five	Episode 19: "Hepatitis"	Written and directed
Six	Episode 2: "Fallen Idol"	Written and directed
Six	Episode 4: "War of Nerves"	Written and directed
Six	Episode 7: "In Love and War"	Written and directed
Six	Episode 12: "Comrades in Arms, Part 1"	Written; directed with Burt Metcalfe
Six	Episode 13: "Comrades in Arms, Part 2"	Written; directed with Burt Metcalfe
Seven	Episode 5: "The Billfold Syndrome"	Directed
Seven	Episode 8: "Major Ego"	Directed
Seven	Episode 14: "Dear Sis"	Written and directed
Seven	Episode 16: "Inga"	Written and directed
Seven	Episode 25: "The Party"	Written with Burt Metcalfe
Eight	Episode 3: "Guerilla My Dreams"	Directed
Eight	Episode 11: "Life Time"	Written with Walter D. Dishell, M.D.; Directed
Eight	Episode 15: "Yessir, That's Our Baby"	Directed
Eight	Episode 20: "Lend a Hand"	Written and directed
Eight	Episode 22: "Dreams"	Teleplay; story with James Jay Rubinfier; Directed
Nine	Episode 4: "Father's Day"	Directed
Nine	Episode 12: "Depressing News"	Directed
Nine	Episode 15: "Bottoms Up"	Directed
Nine	Episode 20: "The Life You Save"	Written with John Rappaport; Directed
Ten	Episode 6: "Communication Breakdown"	Directed
Ten	Episode 10: "Follies of the Living – Concerns of the Dead"	Written and directed
Ten	Episode 17: "Where There's a Will, There's a War"	Directed
Eleven	Episode 1: "Hey, Look Me Over"	Written with Karen Hall
Eleven	Episode 16: "Goodbye, Farewell and Amen"	Written with Burt Metcalfe, John Rappaport, Dan Wilcox, Thad Mumford, Elias Davis, David Pollock and Karen Hall; Directed

=== 1984–1999: Established actor ===
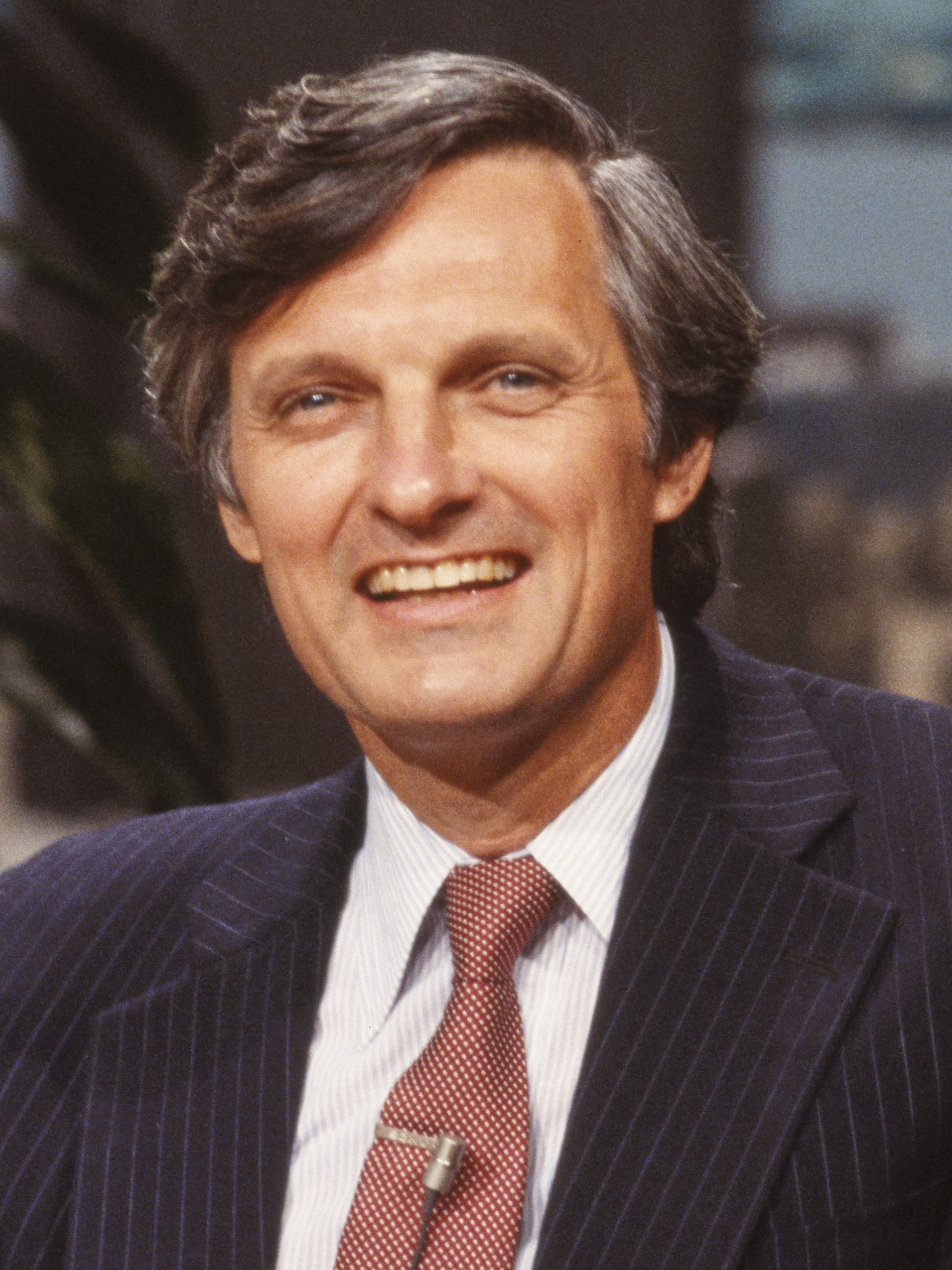
Alda in 1979

Alda's prominence in M*A*S*H provided him a platform to speak out on political topics. He has been a strong and vocal supporter of women's rights and the feminist movement. He co-chaired, with former First Lady Betty Ford, the Equal Rights Amendment Countdown campaign. In 1976, The Boston Globe dubbed him "the quintessential Honorary Woman: a feminist icon" for his activism on behalf of the Equal Rights Amendment.

During M*A*S*H's run and continuing through the 1980s, Alda embarked on a successful career as a writer and director, with the ensemble comedy drama, The Four Seasons (1981) being perhaps his most notable hit. After M*A*S*H, Alda took on a series of roles that either parodied or directly contradicted his "nice guy" image. He then partnered with producer Martin Bregman on various films, first with an agreement at Universal Pictures in 1983, then it was moved to Lorimar Motion Pictures in 1986. In 1988, Alda starred opposite Ann-Margret in the marital comedy A New Life. He also appeared frequently in the films of Woody Allen, beginning with Crimes and Misdemeanors (1989).

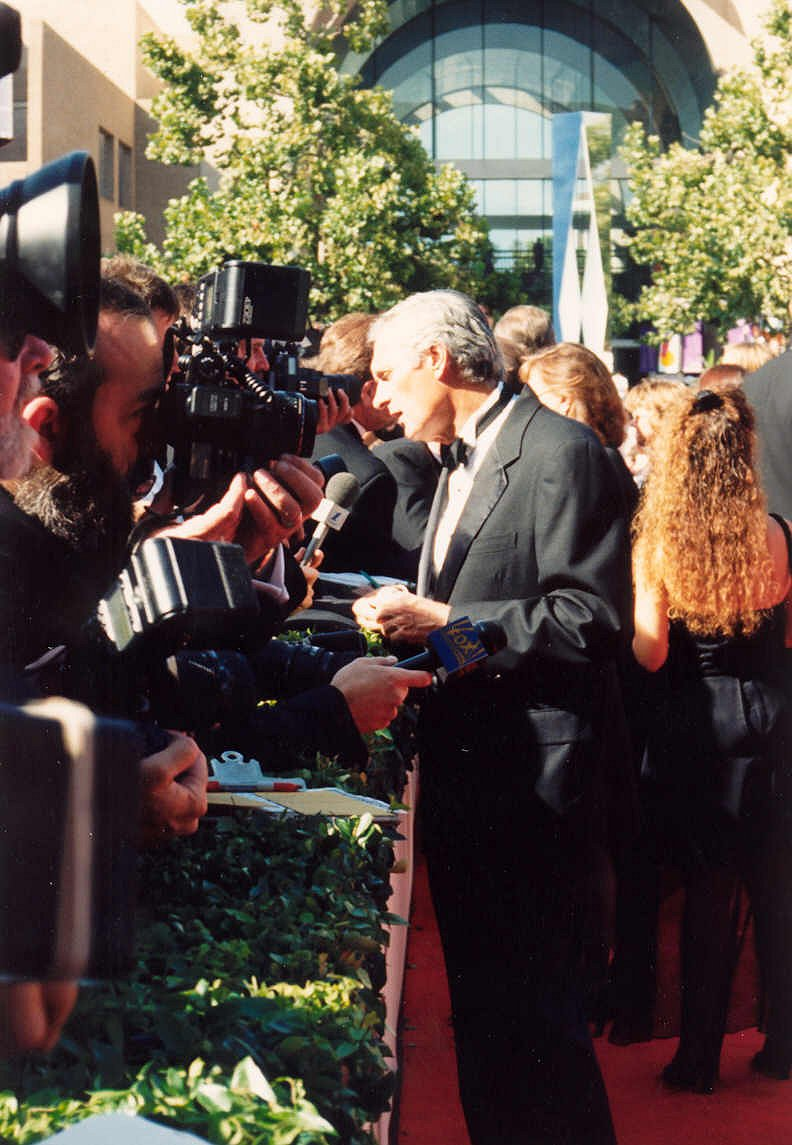
Alda at the 1994 Emmys

Betsy's Wedding (1990) is Alda's last directing credit to date. Alda had a co-starring role as Dr. Robert Gallo in the 1993 television film And the Band Played On. He continued appearing in the films of his friend Woody Allen, including Manhattan Murder Mystery (1993) and Everyone Says I Love You (1996). When asked about the controversy surrounding Allen in 2019, Alda stated: "I'd work with him again if he wanted me. I'm not qualified to judge him... I just don't have enough information to convince me I shouldn't work with him. And he's an enormously talented guy."

Alda played Nobel Prize–winning physicist Richard Feynman in the play QED, which had only one other character. Although Peter Parnell wrote the play, Alda both produced and inspired it. From the fall season of 1993 until the show ended in 2005, Alda was the host for Scientific American Frontiers, which began on PBS in 1990. In 1995, he starred as the President of the United States in Michael Moore's political satire/comedy film Canadian Bacon. Around this time, rumors circulated that Alda was considering running for the United States Senate in New Jersey, but he denied this. In 1996, Alda played Henry Ford, founder of the Ford Motor Company, in Camping With Henry and Tom, based on the book by Mark St. Germain and appeared in the comedy film, Flirting with Disaster. In 1997, Alda played National Security Adviser Alvin Jordan In Murder at 1600. In 1999, Alda portrayed Dr. Gabriel Lawrence, Dr. Kerry Weaver's mentor, in the NBC program ER for five episodes. During the later episodes, Lawrence was revealed to be in the early stages of Alzheimer's disease. Alda was nominated for Primetime Emmy Award for Outstanding Guest Actor in a Drama Series.

Alda starred in the original Broadway production of the play Art, which opened on March 1, 1998, at the Bernard B. Jacobs Theatre. The play won the Tony Award for Best Play.

=== Since 2000: The West Wing and other roles ===
Beginning in 2004, Alda was a regular cast member on the NBC program The West Wing, portraying California Republican U.S. Senator and presidential candidate Arnold Vinick, until the show's conclusion in May 2006. He made his premiere in the sixth season's eighth episode, "In The Room", and was added to the opening credits with the thirteenth episode, "King Corn". In August 2006, Alda won an Emmy Award for his portrayal of Vinick in the final season of The West Wing. Alda appeared in a total of twenty-eight episodes during the show's sixth and seventh seasons. Alda had been a serious candidate, along with Sidney Poitier, for the role of President Josiah Bartlet before Martin Sheen was ultimately cast in the role.

In 2004, Alda portrayed conservative Maine Senator Owen Brewster in Martin Scorsese's Academy Award–winning film The Aviator, in which he co-starred with Leonardo DiCaprio. Alda received his first Academy Award nomination for this role in 2005. Alda also had a part in the 2000 romantic comedy What Women Want, as the chief executive officer of the advertising firm where the main characters worked.

In early 2005, Alda starred as Shelly Levene in the Tony Award–winning Broadway revival of David Mamet's Glengarry Glen Ross, for which he received a nomination for the Tony Award for Best Featured Actor in a Play, losing to his co-star Liev Schreiber. Throughout 2009 and 2010, he appeared in three episodes of 30 Rock as Milton Greene, the biological father of Jack Donaghy, played by Alec Baldwin. In January 2010, Alda hosted The Human Spark, a three-part series originally broadcast on PBS discussing the nature of human uniqueness and recent studies on the human brain. In 2006, Alda contributed his voice to a part in the audio book of Max Brooks' World War Z. In this book, he voiced Arthur Sinclair Jr., the director of the United States government's fictional Department of Strategic Resources (DeStRes). In 2011, Alda starred with Ben Stiller, Matthew Broderick and Eddie Murphy in the comedy film Tower Heist.

Alda returned to Broadway in November 2014, playing the role of Andrew Makepeace in the revival of Love Letters at the Brooks Atkinson Theater alongside Candice Bergen. In 2015, Alda appeared as a lawyer, Thomas Watters, alongside Tom Hanks as James Donovan, in Steven Spielberg's cold-war drama film Bridge of Spies, which received an Academy Award nomination for Best Picture.

In 2016, Alda gained critical praise for his performance in Louis C.K.'s web-based series Horace and Pete as the irascible Uncle Pete. IndieWire critic Sam Adams described it as "his best role in years". In regard to C.K.'s recent scandal, Alda stated, "I respect Louis so much as an artist. But he did a terrible thing, and I hope he finds a way to come to terms with both of those things."

Also in 2016, Alda took part in the opening night show of John Mulaney and Nick Kroll's The Oh, Hello Show at the Lyceum Theatre on Broadway. The show is said to be inspired by "two old men at the Strand buying a copy of Alda's book". Before bringing Alda onstage, Mulaney said: "This is genuinely the best guest we ever had."

From 2018 to 2020, Alda portrayed psychiatrist Dr. Arthur Amiot in the Showtime crime drama series Ray Donovan. He reprised this role in Ray Donovan: The Movie (2022).

In 2019, Alda appeared in Noah Baumbach's thirteenth film, Marriage Story, as a warm-hearted lawyer who represents a stage director (Adam Driver) during the divorce proceedings. In a 2019 interview with The Wall Street Journal, Alda discussed the effects of his illness, mainly Parkinson's disease, and other related issues. He stated, "I have this tremor. It's not part of the script so I didn't want it to be distracting if Noah thought it would be distracting." Alda has received widespread acclaim for his performance.

In 2025, Alda appeared in a cameo role in The Four Seasons, a Netflix miniseries. This was a remake of The Four Seasons which he directed and starred in in 1981.

== Charitable works ==
Alda has done extensive charity work.

In April 1981, Alda spoke in a New Jersey radio ad promoting water conservation during a drought that had led to water rationing in many counties.

He helped narrate a 2005 St. Jude Children's Research Hospital–produced one-hour special TV show Fighting for Life. His wife, Arlene, and he are also close friends of Marlo Thomas, who is very active in fund-raising for the hospital that her father, Danny Thomas founded. The television special featured Ben Bowen as one of six patients being treated for childhood cancer at Saint Jude. Alda and Marlo Thomas had also worked together in the early 1970s on a critically acclaimed children's album entitled Free to Be... You and Me, which featured Alda, Thomas, and a number of other well-known character actors. This project remains one of the earliest public signs of his support of women's rights. Alda chaired "Men for the Equal Rights Amendment" and was appointed to the International Women's Year Commission.

== Communicating science ==
For 14 years, he served as the host of Scientific American Frontiers, a television show that explored cutting-edge advances in science and technology. In 2010, he became a visiting professor at Stony Brook University. In 2009, he was a founder of the university's Alan Alda Center for Communicating Science. He continues as a member of its advisory board. He is also on the advisory board of the Future of Life Institute. He serves on the board of the World Science Festival and is a judge for Math-O-Vision.

Alda has an avid interest in cosmology, and participated in BBC coverage of the opening of the Large Hadron Collider, at CERN, Geneva, in September 2008.

He was named an Honorary Fellow by the Society for Technical Communication in 2014 for his work with the Center for Communicating Science and the annual Flame Challenge. Alda would like to use his expertise in acting and communication to help scientists communicate more effectively to the public. In 2014, Alda was awarded the American Chemical Society's James T. Grady-James H. Stack Award for Interpreting Chemistry for the Public for his work in science communication. He was awarded the National Academy of Sciences Public Welfare Medal in 2016 "for his extraordinary application of the skills honed as an actor to communicating science on television and stage, and by teaching scientists innovative techniques that allow them to tell their stories to the public".

In 2011, Alda wrote Radiance: The Passion of Marie Curie, a full-length play that focuses on Marie Curie's professional and personal life during the time between the Nobel Prizes won by her for physics and chemistry, from 1903 to 1911.

On February 18, 2021, he received the Kavli Foundation's first-ever Distinguished Kavli Science Communicator award for his pioneering work in communicating the excitement, mystery and marvels of science.

== Personal life ==
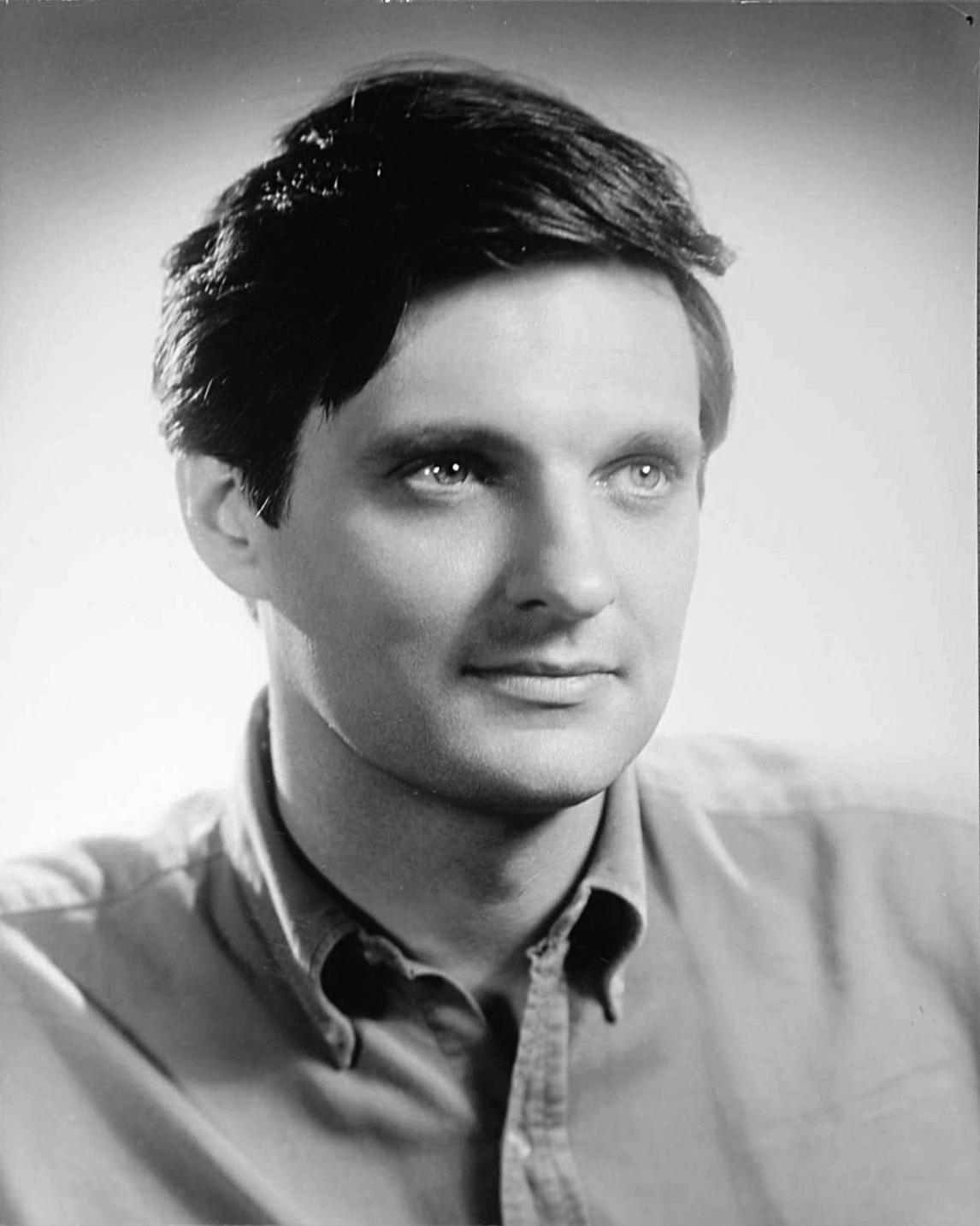
Alda, 1960s

In 1956, while attending Fordham, Alda met Arlene Weiss, who was attending Hunter College. They bonded at a mutual friend's dinner party; when a rum cake accidentally fell onto the kitchen floor, they were the only two guests who did not hesitate to eat it. He addressed the incident by saying: "We did eat the rum cake off the floor and were inseparable after that. But I was captivated by her even earlier in the meal when I heard her at the end of the table laughing at my jokes. She had me at Ha." A year after his graduation, on March 15, they were married. They have three daughters, including Beatrice.

The Aldas were long-time residents of Leonia, New Jersey. Alda frequented Sol & Sol Deli on Palisade Avenue in the nearby town of Englewood, New Jersey. This was mirrored in his character's daydream about eating whitefish from the establishment in an episode of M*A*S*H in which Hawkeye sustains a head injury.

In Things I Overheard While Talking to Myself, Alda described how as a teen he was raised as a Roman Catholic and eventually he realized he had begun thinking like an agnostic or atheist. While he states that he still prays on occasion, he said he wants to find meaning in this life rather than worrying about the next one. He states that when he talks to God it often comes at times of fear rather than out of a sense of belief. Furthermore, he does not like to be labeled as an agnostic, stating in an interview for the 2008 question section of the Edge Foundation website, that it was too fancy a word for him. He argues he simply is not a believer and questions why people are so frightened of others who hold beliefs different from their own.

On July 31, 2018, Alda appeared on CBS This Morning and announced he had been diagnosed with Parkinson's disease three years earlier.

== Memoirs ==
In 2005, Alda published his first memoir, Never Have Your Dog Stuffed: and Other Things I've Learned. Among other stories, he recalls his intestines becoming strangulated while on location in La Serena, Chile, for his PBS show Scientific American Frontiers, during which he mildly surprised a young doctor with his understanding of medical procedures, which he had learned from M*A*S*H. He also talks about his mother's battle with schizophrenia. The title comes from an incident in his childhood, when Alda was distraught about his dog dying and his well-meaning father had the animal stuffed. Alda was horrified by the results, and took from this that sometimes we have to accept things as they are, rather than desperately and fruitlessly trying to change them.

His second memoir, Things I Overheard While Talking to Myself (2008), weaves together advice from public speeches he has given with personal recollections about his life and beliefs.

His third memoir, If I Understood You, Would I Have This Look on My Face? My Adventures in the Art and Science of Relating and Communicating (2017), is a story of his quest to learn how to communicate better, and to teach others to do the same.

== Acting credits ==
=== Film ===
Year	Title	Role	Notes
1963	Gone Are the Days!	Charlie Cotchipee	
1968	Paper Lion	George Plimpton	
1969	The Extraordinary Seaman	Lt. Morton Krim	
1970	Jenny	Delano	
1970	The Moonshine War	John W. Martin	
1971	The Mephisto Waltz	Myles Clarkson	
1972	To Kill a Clown	Major Evelyn Ritchie	
1978	Same Time, Next Year	George Peters	
1978	California Suite	Bill Warren	
1979	The Seduction of Joe Tynan	Joe Tynan	Also writer
1981	The Four Seasons	Jack Burroughs	Also writer and director
1986	Sweet Liberty	Michael Burgess	Also writer and director
1988	A New Life	Steve Giardino	Also writer and director
1989	Crimes and Misdemeanors	Lester	
1990	Betsy's Wedding	Eddie Hopper	Also writer and director
1992	Whispers in the Dark	Leo Green	
1993	Manhattan Murder Mystery	Ted	
1995	Canadian Bacon	President of the United States	
1996	Flirting with Disaster	Richard Schlichting	
1996	Everyone Says I Love You	Bob Dandridge	
1997	Murder at 1600	National Security Advisor Alvin Jordan	
1997	Mad City	Kevin Hollander	
1998	The Object of My Affection	Sidney Miller	
1999	Keepers of the Frame	Himself	Documentary
2000	What Women Want	Dan Wanamaker	
2004	The Aviator	Owen Brewster	
2007	Resurrecting the Champ	Ralph Metz	
2008	Diminished Capacity	Uncle Rollie Zerbs	
2008	Flash of Genius	Gregory Lawson	
2008	Nothing but the Truth	Albert Burnside	
2011	Tower Heist	Arthur Shaw	
2012	Wanderlust	Carvin Wiggins	
2015	The Longest Ride	Ira Levinson	
2015	Bridge of Spies	Thomas Watters	
2019	Marriage Story	Bert Spitz	
2023	Remembering Gene Wilder	Himself	Documentary

=== Television ===
Year	Title	Role	Notes
1958	The Phil Silvers Show	Carlyle Thomson III	Episode: "Bilko the Art Lover"
1962	Naked City	Young Poet	Episode: "Hold for Gloria Christmas"
1963	The Doctors and the Nurses	Dr. John Griffin	Episodes: "Many a Sullivan", "Night Sounds"
1963	Route 66	Dr. Glazer	Episode: "Soda Pop and Paper Flags"
1963	East Side/West Side	Freddie Wilcox	Episode: "The Sinner"
1965	The Trials of O'Brien	Nick Staphos	Episode: "Picture Me a Murder"
1967	Coronet Blue	Clay Breznia	Episode: "Six Months to Mars"
1968	Premiere	Frank St. John	Episode: "Higher and Higher, Attorneys at Law"
1972	The Glass House	Jonathon Paige	Television film
1972	Playmates	Marshall Barnett	Television film
1972–1983	M*A*S*H	Capt. Benjamin Franklin "Hawkeye" Pierce	Main role, 256 episodes; also writer and director
1973	Isn't It Shocking?	Dan Barnes	Television film
1974	The Carol Burnett Show	Himself	Episode: "#8.13"
1974	Free to Be... You and Me	Himself	Television film
1974	6 Rms Riv Vu	Paul Friedman	Television film
1977	Kill Me If You Can	Caryl W. Chessman	Television film
1984	The Four Seasons	Jack Burroughs	Episode: "Pilot: Part 1"; also writer and executive producer
1993	And the Band Played On	Dr. Robert Gallo	Television film
1993–2005	Scientific American Frontiers	Himself (host)	81 episodes
1994	White Mile	Dan Cutler	Television film
1996	Jake's Women	Jake	Television film
1999	ER	Dr. Gabriel Lawrence	5 episodes
2001	Club Land	Willie Walters	Television film
2001	The Killing Yard	Ernie Goodman	Television film
2004–2006	The West Wing	Senator Arnold Vinick	28 episodes
2005	Getaway	Himself	Episode: "Found"
2009–2010	30 Rock	Milton Greene	3 episodes
2011–2013	The Big C	Dr. Atticus Sherman	6 episodes
2012	The Human Spark	Himself	3 episodes
2013	Brains on Trial with Alan Alda	Himself	2 episodes
2013	50 Children	Narrator	HBO documentary
2013–2014	The Blacklist	Alan Fitch	5 episodes
2016	Horace and Pete	Uncle Pete	5 episodes
2016	Broad City	Dr. Jay Heller	Episode: "2016"
2018–2019	The Good Fight	Solomon Waltzer	3 episodes
2018–2020	Ray Donovan	Dr. Arthur Amiot	8 episodes
2022	Ray Donovan: The Movie	Dr. Arthur Amiot	Television film
2025	The Four Seasons	Don	2 episodes; also producer

=== Theatre ===
Year	Title	Role	Notes
1959	Only in America	Telephone Man	Cort Theatre, Broadway
1961–1962	Purlie Victorious	Charlie Cotchipee	Longacre Theatre, Broadway
1964	Fair Game for Lovers	Benny	Cort Theatre, Broadway
1964	Cafe Crown	Dr. Irving Gilbert	Martin Beck Theatre, Broadway
1964–1965	The Owl and the Pussycat	F. Sherman	Royale Theatre, Broadway
1966–1967	The Apple Tree	Various	Shubert Theatre, Broadway
1991	Our Town	Stage Manager	Shaftesbury Theatre, London
1992	Jake's Women	Jake	Neil Simon Theatre, Broadway
1998–1999	Art	Marc	Royale Theatre, Broadway
2001–2002	QED	Richard Feynman	Vivian Beaumont Theater, Broadway
2003	The Play What I Wrote	Mystery Guest Star	Lyceum Theatre, Broadway
2005	Glengarry Glen Ross	Shelly Levene	Bernard B. Jacobs Theatre, Broadway
2014	Love Letters	Andrew Makepeace Ladd III	Brooks Atkinson Theatre, Broadway
2016	Oh, Hello	Himself (opening night)	Lyceum Theatre, Broadway

=== Podcasts ===
Year	Title	Role	Notes
2018–present	Clear+Vivid	Host	
2020–2021	Science Clear+Vivid	Host	

== Awards and nominations ==
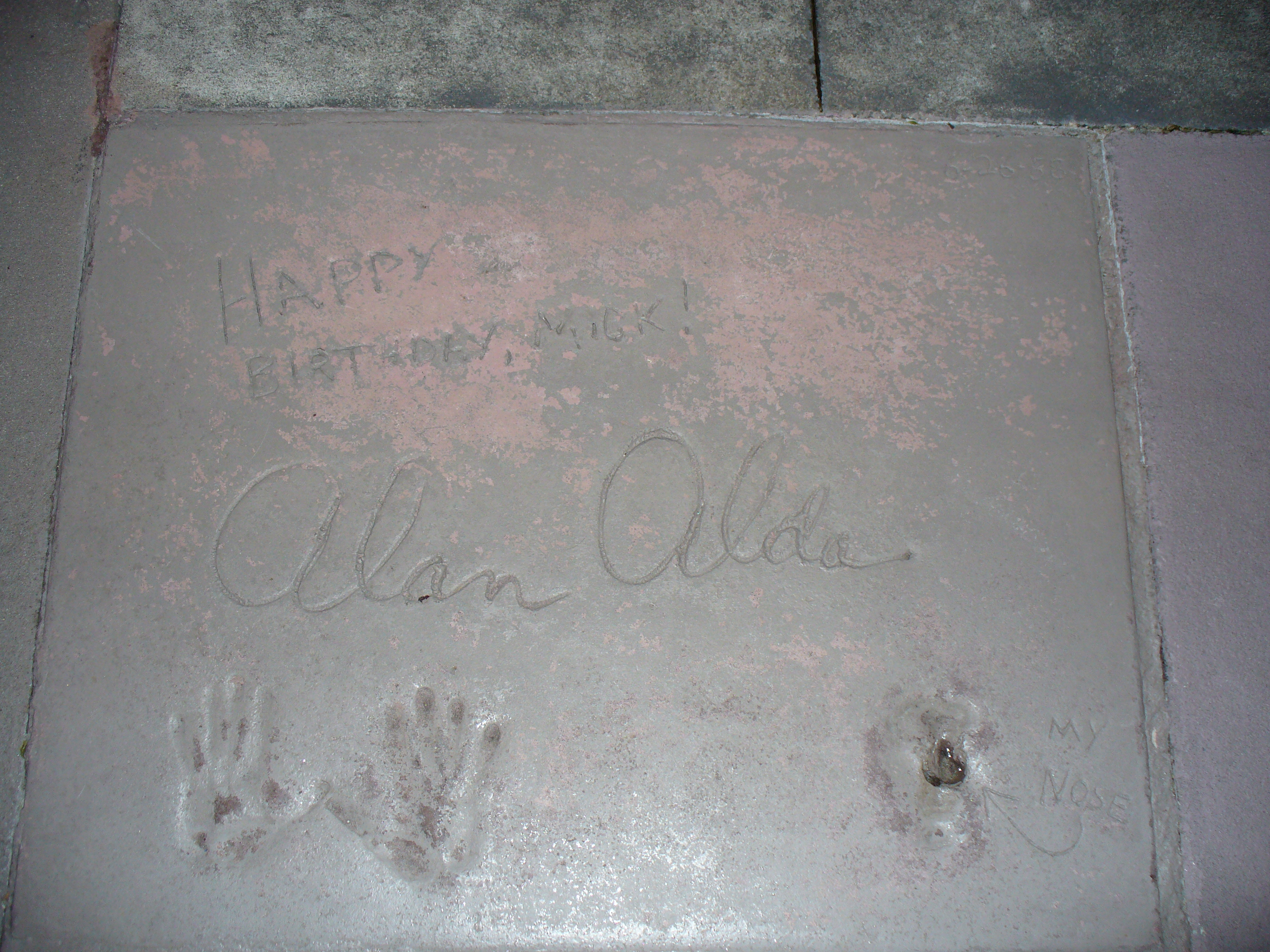
Alda's handprints and noseprint at Disney's Hollywood Studios

Throughout his entire career, Alda has won six Primetime Emmy Awards and six Golden Globe Awards, and has been nominated for an Academy Award, two BAFTA Awards, a Grammy Award, three Tony Awards, and four Screen Actors Guild Awards. He was inducted in the Television Hall of Fame in 1994, and received the Screen Actors Guild Life Achievement Award in 2018. He has also received numerous honorary degrees.

== Published works ==
- — (2006). Never Have Your Dog Stuffed. London: Hutchinson. ISBN 978-0-09-179652-5. OCLC 64931144.
- — (2007). Things I Overheard While Talking to Myself. New York: Random House. ISBN 978-1-4000-6617-9. OCLC 122309367.
- — (2013). Radiance: The Passion of Marie Curie. Samuel French, Inc. ISBN 978-0-573-70060-6.
- — (2017). If I Understood You, Would I Have This Look on My Face?. New York: Random House. ISBN 978-0-8129-8914-4. OCLC 970641564.
- — (2020). Soldiers of Science: An Interview with Dr. Anthony Fauci. Audible Original.
