= Alan Alda Center for Communicating Science =

Organization to teach scientists to communicate with the public

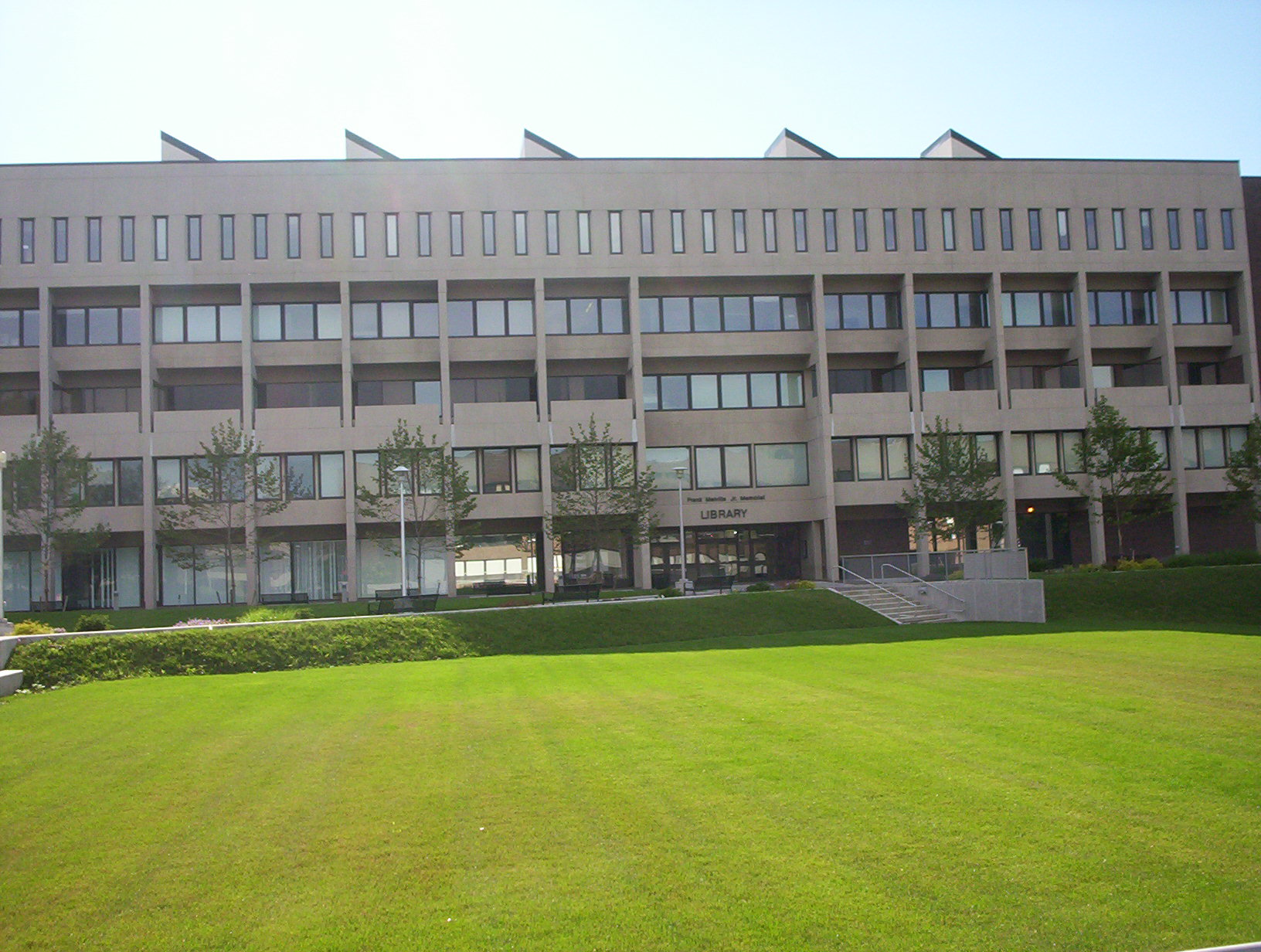
- The Center is based at Stony Brook University's Melville Library
- Named after: Alan Alda
- Formation: 2009; 17 years ago
- Headquarters: Stony Brook, New York, U.S.
- Key people: Lauren Lindenfeld (director)
- Parent organization: School of Communication and Journalism at Stony Brook University
- Website: aldacenter.org
- Formerly called: Center for Communicating Science

The Alan Alda Center for Communicating Science is a cross-disciplinary organization founded in 2009 within Stony Brook University's School of Communication and Journalism, in Stony Brook, New York. Its current director is Laura Lindenfeld. Its goal is to help scientists learn to communicate more effectively with the public, including policymakers, students, funders and the media. It was inspired by Alan Alda, the actor, writer and science advocate, in whose honor it was renamed in 2013, and is supported by Brookhaven National Laboratory and Cold Spring Harbor Laboratory.

== Programs ==
All Alda Center programs are based on the Alda Method, a form of communication training that blends improvisational theater exercises and message-design strategies. The Method helps scientists and researchers connect more directly with listeners and respond more spontaneously to their needs. By 2020 there had been 15,000 attendees at these improv workshops.

In 2012, Alda and the Center issued the "Flame Challenge", asking scientists to come up with the best explanation for a flame for an intended audience of 11-year-olds.
