= Robert Alda =

American actor (1914–1986)

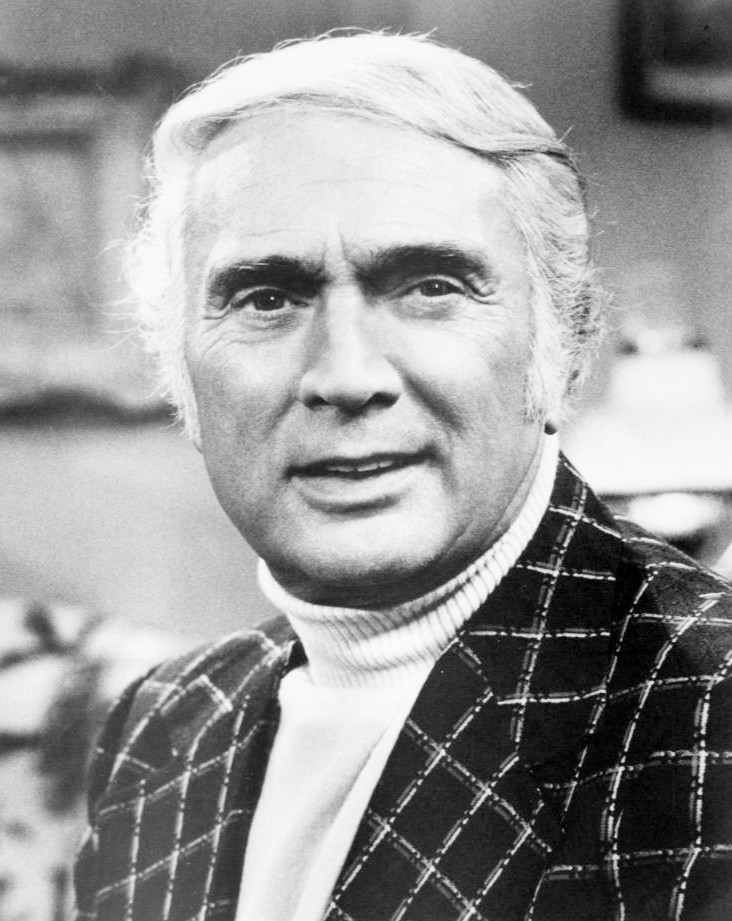
- Alda in 1976
- Born: Alfonso Giovanni Giuseppe Roberto D'Abruzzo; February 26, 1914; New York City, U.S.
- Died: May 3, 1986 (aged 72); Los Angeles, California, U.S.
- Occupations: Actor; singer; dancer
- Years active: 1931–1984
- Spouses: Joan Browne (m. 1932; div. 1946); Flora Marino (m. 1955)
- Children: Antony; Alan
- Relatives: Beatrice Alda (granddaughter); Arlene Alda (daughter-in-law)

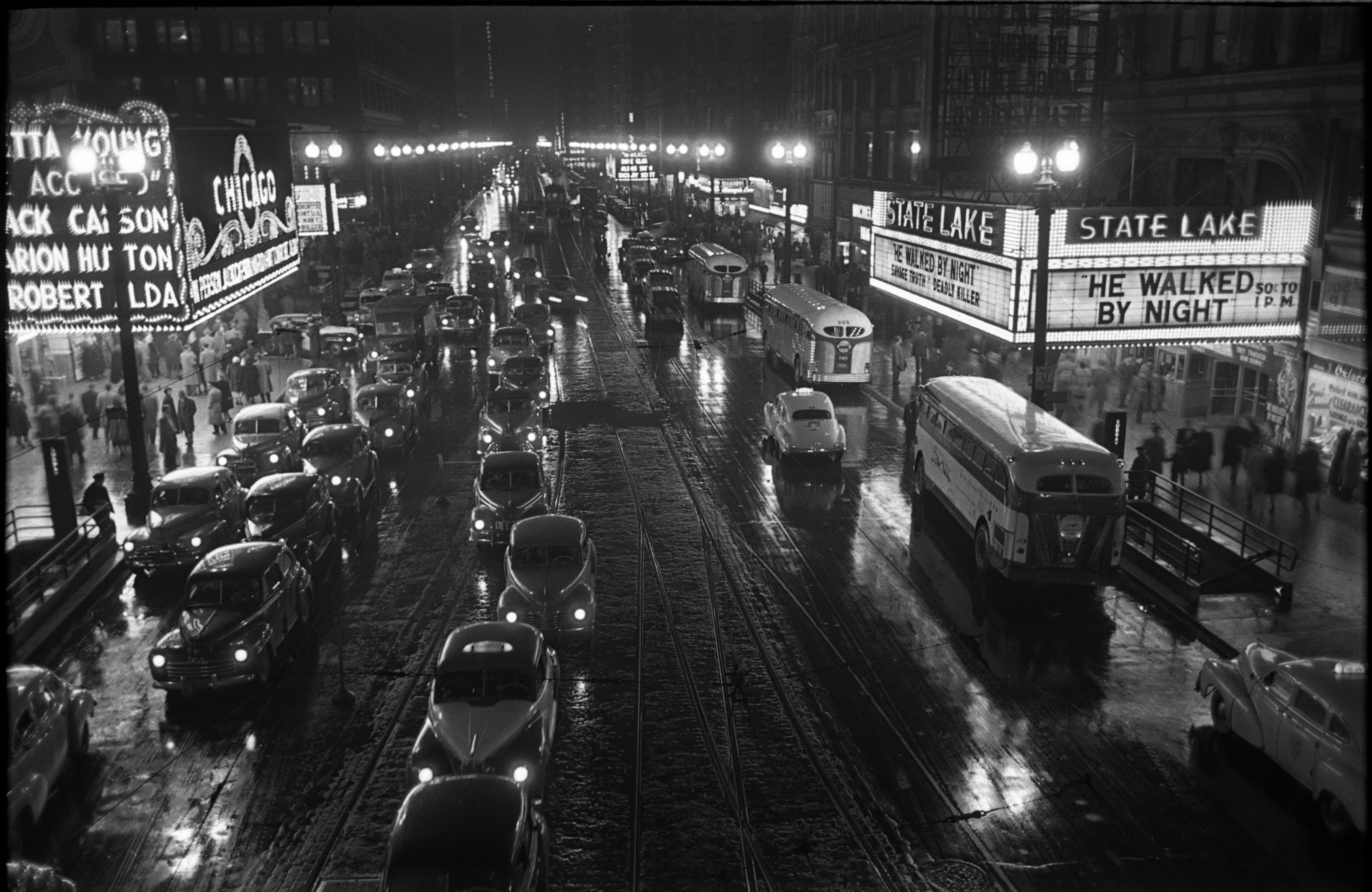
Photo of a Chicago streetscape taken by Stanley Kubrick Look magazine, 1949, from State/Lake station

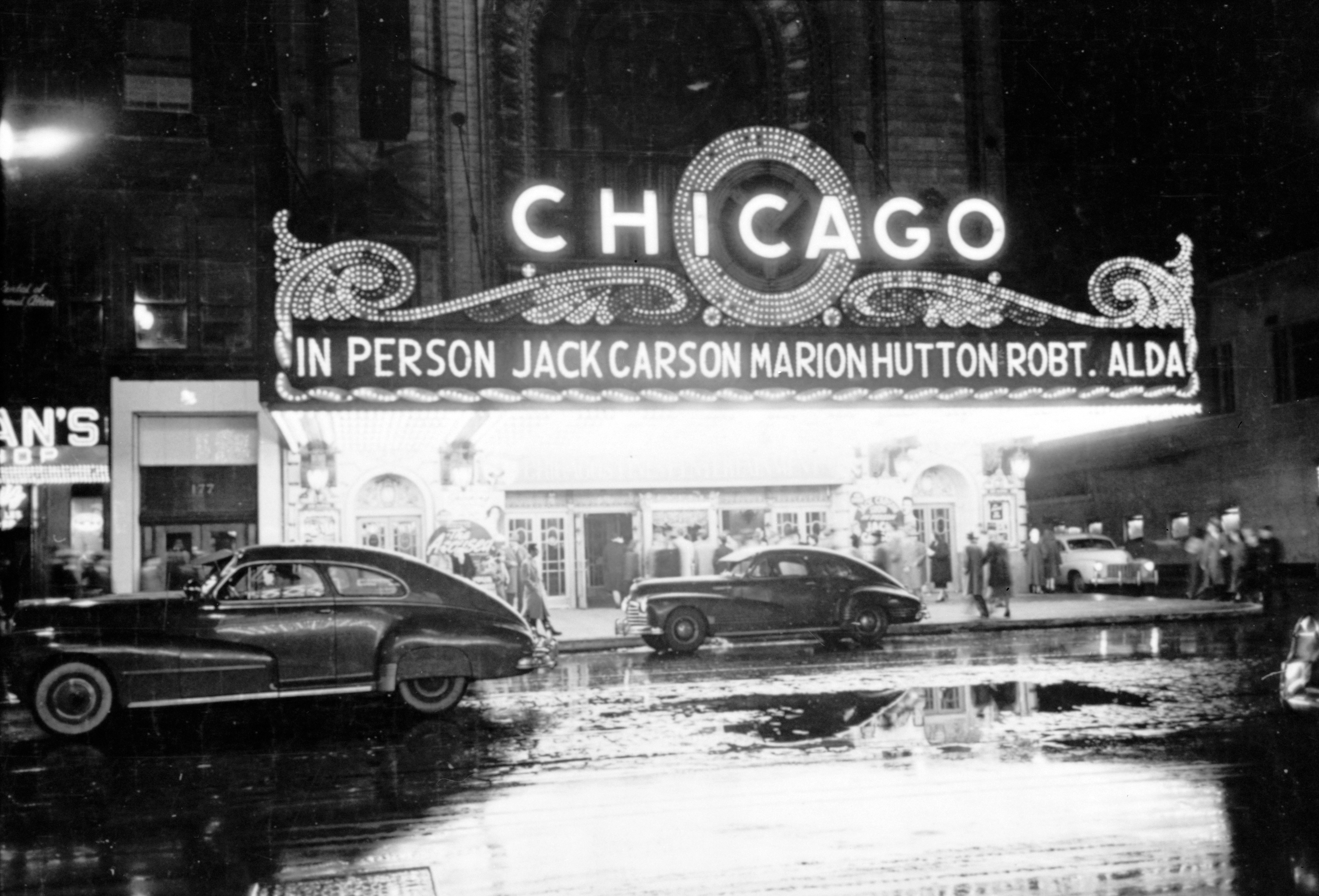
People arriving at the Chicago Theatre for a show starring, in person, Jack Carson, Marion Hutton, and Robert Alda, taken by Stanley Kubrick for Look magazine, 1949

Alfonso Giovanni Giuseppe Roberto D'Abruzzo (February 26, 1914 – May 3, 1986), known professionally as Robert Alda, was an American actor, singer, and dancer. Alda was featured in a number of Broadway productions, then moved to Italy during the early 1960s. He appeared in many European films over the next two decades, occasionally returning to the U.S. for film appearances such as The Girl Who Knew Too Much (1969).

== Career ==
He began his performing career as a singer and dancer in vaudeville after winning a talent contest, and moved on to burlesque.

In 1949, as part of Jack Carson's radio program, Alda toured with Jack Carson and Marion Hutton.

Alda is known for portraying George Gershwin in the biographical film Rhapsody in Blue (1945) as well as the talent agent in the Douglas Sirk classic Imitation of Life (1959). On Broadway, he originated the role of Sky Masterson in Guys and Dolls (1950), for which he won a Tony Award, and starred in What Makes Sammy Run? (1964). He was also the host of the DuMont version of the game show What's Your Bid? (May–June 1953).

In the mid-1950s, Alda starred as espionage agent Colonel Bill Morgan in the syndicated television series Secret Files USA, the episodes of which were based on stories from American intelligence services. He was host of the TV game show Can Do in 1956. His son Alan said "He was very famous but he hardly made much money because that was at a time when Warner had those seven-year contracts."

Alda made two guest appearances with Alan on M*A*S*H, in the episodes "The Consultant" (January 1975) and, also with his younger son Antony Alda, "Lend a Hand" (February 1980).

Alda appeared in an episode of The Feather & Father Gang in 1977.

== Personal life ==
Alda's first wife, and mother of actor Alan Alda, Joan Browne, was a homemaker and former beauty pageant winner. They divorced in 1946.

Alda was the father of actors Alan and Antony Alda.

== Death ==
Alda died on May 3, 1986, aged 72, two years after suffering a stroke from which he never fully recovered. He is buried in the Garden of Ascension lot 9101 Forest Lawn Cemetery, Glendale, California.

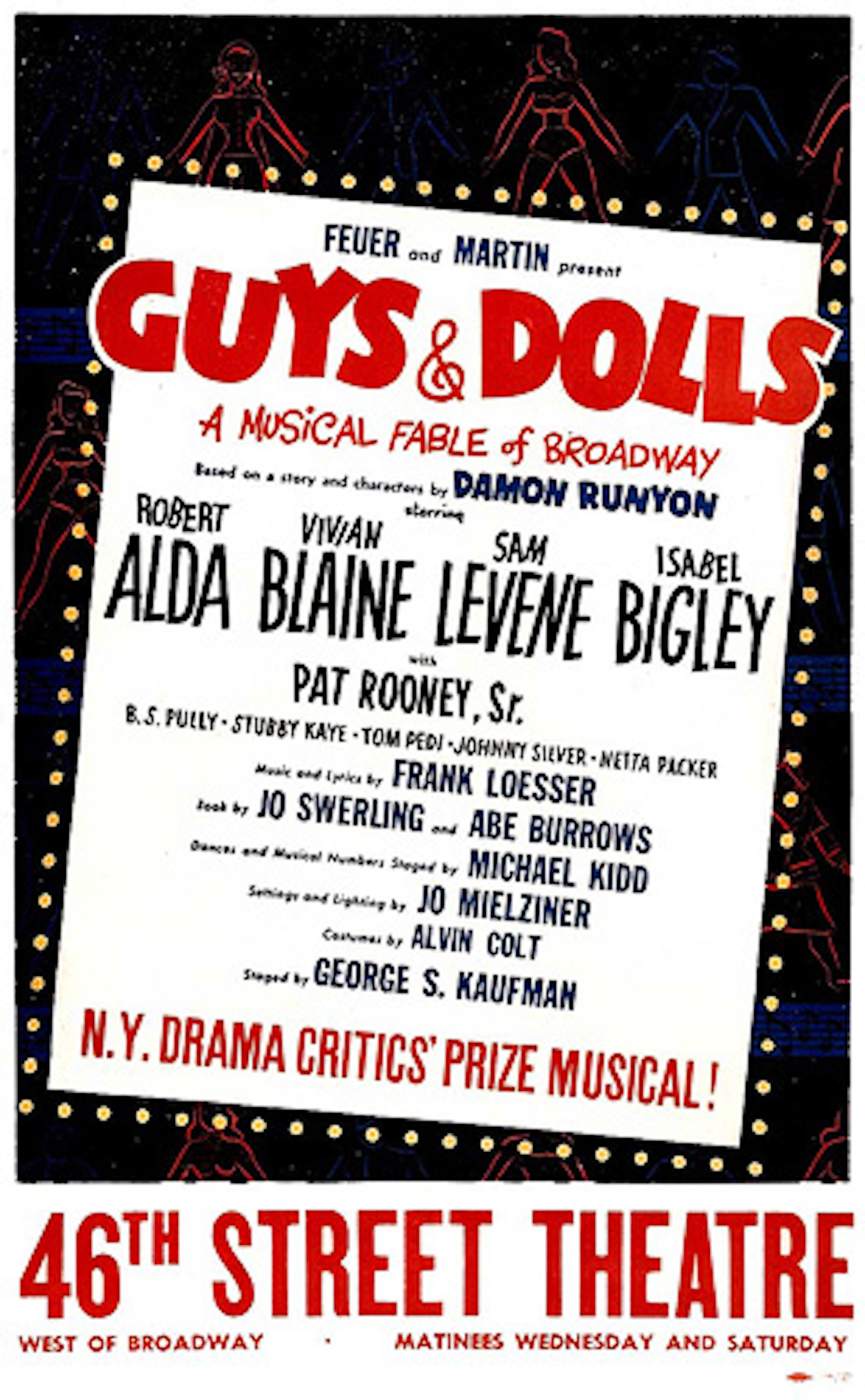
Window Card Poster from 1950 original Broadway production of Guys and Dolls

== Acting credits ==
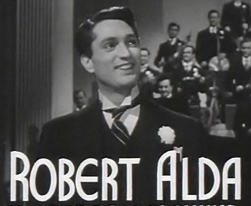
Alda in the trailer for Rhapsody in Blue in 1945

=== Selected filmography ===
- Rhapsody in Blue (1945) as George Gershwin
- Cinderella Jones (1946) as Tommy Coles
- Cloak and Dagger (1946) as Pinkie
- The Beast with Five Fingers (1946) as Bruce Conrad
- The Man I Love (1947) as Nicky Toresca
- Nora Prentiss (1947) as Phil Dinardo, Cafe Owner
- Bungalow 13 (1948)
- April Showers (1948) as Billy Shay
- Homicide (1949) as Andy
- Hollywood Varieties (1950) as Master of Ceremonies
- Tarzan and the Slave Girl (1950) as Neil
- Mister Universe (1951) as Fingers Maroni
- Two Gals and a Guy (1951) as Deke Oliver
- Beautiful But Dangerous (1955) as Maestro Doria
- Assignment Abroad (1955) as Major Bill Morgan
- Alfred Hitchcock Presents (1959) (Season 4 Episode 14: "The Morning After") as Ben Nelson
- Imitation of Life (1959) as Allen Loomis
- The Millionaire (TV series) episode "The Julia Conrad Story" (1959) as Gilbert Patterson, with co-star Ellen Drew
- Un militare e mezzo (1960) as Roy Harrison
- Cleopatra's Daughter (1960) as Inuni, Pharaoh's Architect
- Revenge of the Barbarians (1960) as Ataulf
- The Devil's Hand (1961) as Rick Turner
- Force of Impulse (1961) as Warren Reese
- Toto and Peppino Divided in Berlin (1962) as the Judge
- Musketeers of the Sea (1962) as Vice Governatore Gomez
- All Woman (1967) as Wally
- The Girl Who Knew Too Much (1969) as Kenneth Allardice
- Emergency! (TV series) S2, episode "Syndrome" (1973) as Raymond Boyd
- Night Flight from Moscow (1973) as Polygraph Interrogator
- M*A*S*H (TV series) as Dr. Anthony Borelli in "The Consultant" (1975) and "Lend a Hand" (1980)
- Cagliostro (1975) as Pope Clement XIII
- The House of Exorcism (1975) as Father Michael
- Natale in casa d'appuntamento (1976)
- I Will, I Will... for Now (1976) as Dr. Magnus
- Won Ton Ton, the Dog Who Saved Hollywood (1976) as Richard Entwhistle
- Bittersweet Love (1976) as Ben Peterson
- The Rip-Off (1978) as Captain Donati
- The Rockford Files (1978, TV series) as Cy Margulies
- Every Girl Should Have One (1978) as Adam Becker
- Spider-Man Strikes Back (1978) as Mr. White
- Supertrain (1979, TV series) as Dan Lewis
- Days of Our Lives (1981–82) as Stuart Whyland
- The Love Boat episode "Take a Letter, Vicki; The Floating Bridge Game; The Joy of Celibacy" (1981) as Dr. Frank Leonhardt
- Amanda's (1983, TV series) as Mr. Gordon (final appearance)

=== Theater ===
- Guys and Dolls (1950–1953) — Tony Award for Best Leading Actor in a Musical
- Harbor Lights (1956)
- Roger the Sixth (1957)
- Can-Can (1963)
- What Makes Sammy Run? (1964–1965)
- Riverwind (1966)
- My Daughter, Your Son (1969)
- The Front Page (1969–1970)
- Follies (1973)
- The Sunshine Boys (1974–1975)
