= Stephen Rousseas =

Economist

Stephen Rousseas (January 11, 1921 – February 1, 2012) was the Dexter M. Ferry Jr. Emeritus Professor of Economics at Vassar College. He has also taught at Cornell University, Columbia University, New York University, the University of Michigan and Yale University.

Born in Scranton, Pennsylvania, he was a Columbia graduate, earning a bachelor's degree in 1948 and a PhD in 1954. He was a friend of Andreas Papandreou and active in American organizations supporting Papandreou after the 1967 coup d'état in Greece.

== Bibliography ==
- The Death of Democracy: Greece and the American Conscience, Monetary Theory
- Capitalism and Catastrophe: A Critical Appraisal of the Limits of Capitalism
- The Political Economy of Reaganomics: A Critique
- Post Keynesian Monetary Economics
