= Victor Wallis =

American political scientist (born 1938)

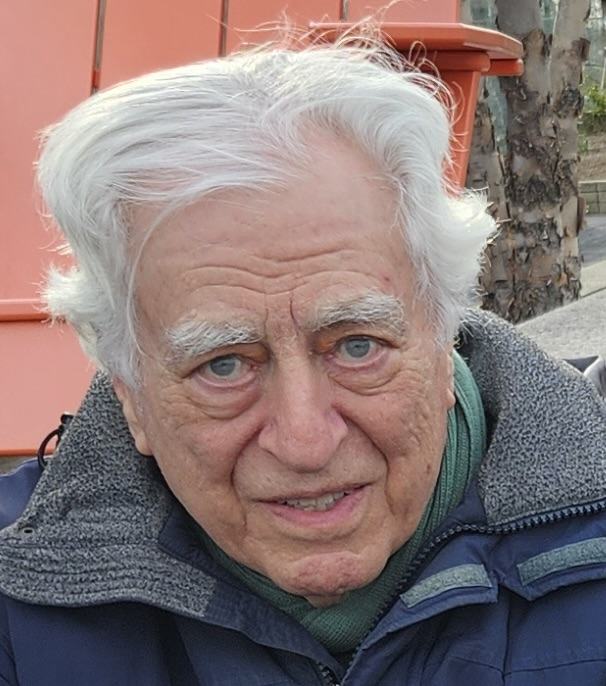
- Born: September 16, 1938 (age 88)
- Citizenship: US
- Occupations: Political scientist, author, academic, and activist

Academic background
- Education: AB., History (1960); MA., History of Ideas (1963); PhD., Political Science (1970)
- Alma mater: Harvard University; Brandeis University; Columbia University

Academic work
- Institutions: Berklee College of Music, Boston
- Website: http://www.victorwallis.com/

Victor Wallis is an American political scientist, author, academic, and activist most known for his work on the relationship between capitalism, ecologies, and socialism. He serves as a professor in the Department of Liberal Arts & Sciences at the Berklee College of Music.

Among Wallis's authored publications are articles, book chapters, and books, including Red-Green Revolution: The Politics and Technology of Ecosocialism (2018) and Socialist Practice: Histories and Theories (2020).

Wallis was the Managing Editor of Socialism and Democracy from 1997 to 2017, and has been Editor-at-Large since then. In 1977, he was elected Chair of the Caucus for a New Political Science (CNPS) for a one-year term, during which he helped in founding the Caucus's flagship journal, New Political Science (NPS), and has remained on the journal's editorial board.

== Early life and education ==
Wallis was born on September 16, 1938, and immigrated with his family from France to the United States in 1940, when he was two years old. He attended private schools before earning an A.B. in history from Harvard in 1960 and an M.A. in the history of ideas from Brandeis University in 1963. He then completed his Ph.D. in political science at Columbia in 1970, specializing in comparative and Latin American politics. As part of his doctoral research, he spent a year in Chile from 1966 to 1967 as a Fulbright scholar, affiliated with the Facultad Latinoamericana de Ciencias Sociales, writing his dissertation on "Foreign Investment and Chilean Politics."

== Career ==
Within academia, Wallis held teaching positions in political science at St. Lawrence University (1968–70), Indiana University-Purdue University at Indianapolis (1970–94), and the Berklee College of Music in Boston (from 1996 onward). He served as the Resident Director of the Indiana/California Program in Lima, from 1982 until 1983, and in the fall of 1987, he directed the International Honors Program in Europe. During the spring of 1988, he was a Resident Scholar at the Institute for Policy Studies in Washington.

Wallis's report, titled "Putting ‘New Political Science’ Back into the Caucus," was published in the Autumn 1975 issue of CNPS's Newsletter, A New Political Science; it recommended that the Caucus adopt a more explicitly anti-capitalist position, arguing that such a stance could enhance its effectiveness within the APSA. In 1977, he was elected Chairperson of the Caucus, where he edited two of its newsletter issues, and helped launch the journal New Political Science in 1979, continuing as an editorial board member since.

After 1979, he frequently spoke through local media and across central Indiana regarding the United States' involvement in El Salvador, Nicaragua—where he spent four weeks in 1984—and Grenada. Additionally, he addressed local issues, particularly those related to prisons. His efforts began in 1974 with a study group composed of former prisoners and a newsletter that highlighted prison abuses—and throughout the years, he continued to support prisoners engaged in political education and organizing. In 1978, he joined the New American Movement, remaining an at-large member until its dissolution in 1981. Throughout the 1980s, he supported the New York-based Wellspring Fund, which backed initiatives that combined working-class organizing with environmental and cultural efforts. Since 2011, he has been part of the online multi-issue activist organization RootsAction.

== Scholarship ==
Wallis's research and publications span topics such as Marxism, environmental concerns, ecology and technology, workers' self-management, U.S. society and politics, Latin American politics and relations, and Latin American cinema. In 1974, he applied major findings from his dissertation in his work "Imperialism and the 'Via Chilena'", which analyzed the factors that led to the undermining of the Allende government. His interest in Latin American issues extended to writing several film reviews for the media journal Jump Cut over the decades. Additionally, his exploration of worker control in Chile prompted a broader study on the topic, originally published in 1978, and later expanded and revised into a book chapter in 2011.

Beginning with his 1990 essay on the collapse of the Soviet bloc, Wallis initiated his collaboration with Socialism and Democracy, where he served as managing editor for twenty years from 1997. His writing increasingly focused on the environmental crisis, starting with his 1992 article in Monthly Review. Over the years, he contributed numerous articles to Capitalism Nature Socialism, including "Toward Ecological Socialism” (2001), which has been translated into six languages. This body of work culminated in his 2018 book, Red-Green Revolution, which particularly argued that addressing the ecological crisis required a socialist framework rooted in democratic participation, informed by past efforts. This book included a revised version of his 2015 article on intersectionality, which sought to bridge the divide between Marxism and 'new social movement' theorizing, and has been translated into German and French.

Furthermore, Wallis authored articles for both Monthly Review and New Political Science that address the history and prospects of the U.S. Left, which, along with other writings, were incorporated into his 2020 book Socialist Practice. Prior to that, his 2018 lecture series in China provided a concise overview of U.S. society and politics, forming the foundation for his book Democracy Denied.

Among other works, Wallis critiqued the U.S. response to COVID-19 in an April 2020 interview, contrasting it with the effective approaches of socialist countries like China and Cuba, which integrated government action with public participation. Moreover, he highlighted the censorship faced by dissenting doctors, such as Peter A. McCullough, whose alternative views on COVID-19 treatment were labeled as "misinformation." He argued that this suppression of dissent not only influenced policy formation but also prioritized pharmaceutical interests over effective public health measures, ultimately undermining the pandemic response.

== Critical reception ==
Wallis's works have been reviewed, receiving attention from scholars and activists. Joseph G. Ramsey praised him for challenging readers "to grasp this world by its roots, so that we can make another world possible," while Michael Löwy, the Marxist sociologist, described Red-Green Revolution as "outstanding." Similarly, Ian Angus commented, "Victor Wallis' new book is an important contribution to the growing ecosocialist movement, a passionate call to organize and act against capitalist ecocide," and Christian Stache, writing in International Critical Thought, noted that Wallis is "one of the leading political thinkers of the ecosocialist movement in the English-speaking world ..."

Carl Boggs, commenting on Democracy Denied, commended Wallis for a "masterful, critical overview of United States history with a focus on democratic politics, or the lack of such politics." Additionally, a Virginia prisoner wrote for San Francisco Bay View, observing that even apolitical readers found the book "reader-friendly and well-articulated." Mat Callahan acknowledged Socialist Practice for offering "thought-provoking interventions," while Steve Ellner highlighted that the book is a "fascinating study of leftist theory and practice from Marx to the present."

== Awards and honors ==
- 2023 – Charles A. McCoy Career Achievement Award, Caucus for a Critical Political Science

== Bibliography ==
=== Books ===
- Red-Green Revolution: The Politics and Technology of Ecosocialism (2018; 2nd edition 2022) ISBN 978-1895131574
- Democracy Denied: Five Lectures on U.S. Politics (2019) ISBN 978-1569026144
- Socialist Practice: Histories and Theories (2020) ISBN 978-3030350659

=== Selected articles ===
- Wallis, V. (1974). Imperialism and the "Via Chilena". Latin American Perspectives, 1(2), 44–57. https://doi.org/10.1177/0094582X7400100205
- Wallis, V. (1983). Workers’ Control in Latin America. Latin American Research Review, 18(2), 181–189. https://doi.org/10.1017/S0023879100020914
- Wallis, V. (1990). Marxism in the age of Gorbachev. Socialism and Democracy, 6(2), 47–73. https://doi.org/10.1080/08854309208428073
- Wallis, V. (2001). Toward Ecological Socialism. Capitalism Nature Socialism, 12(1), 127–145. https://doi.org/10.1080/104557501101244767
- Wallis, V. (2017). Capitalism Unhinged: Crisis of Legitimacy in the United States. Socialism and Democracy, 31(3), 11–23. https://doi.org/10.1080/08854300.2017.1376500
- Wallis, V. (2021). Technology and Ecosocialism. Perspectives on Global Development and Technology, 20(1–2), 13–29. https://doi.org/10.1163/15691497-12341580
