= Margaret Chant-Papandreou =

Ex-wife of Andreas Papandreou (1923–2026)

Margaret Papandreou
- Μαργαρίτα Παπανδρέου
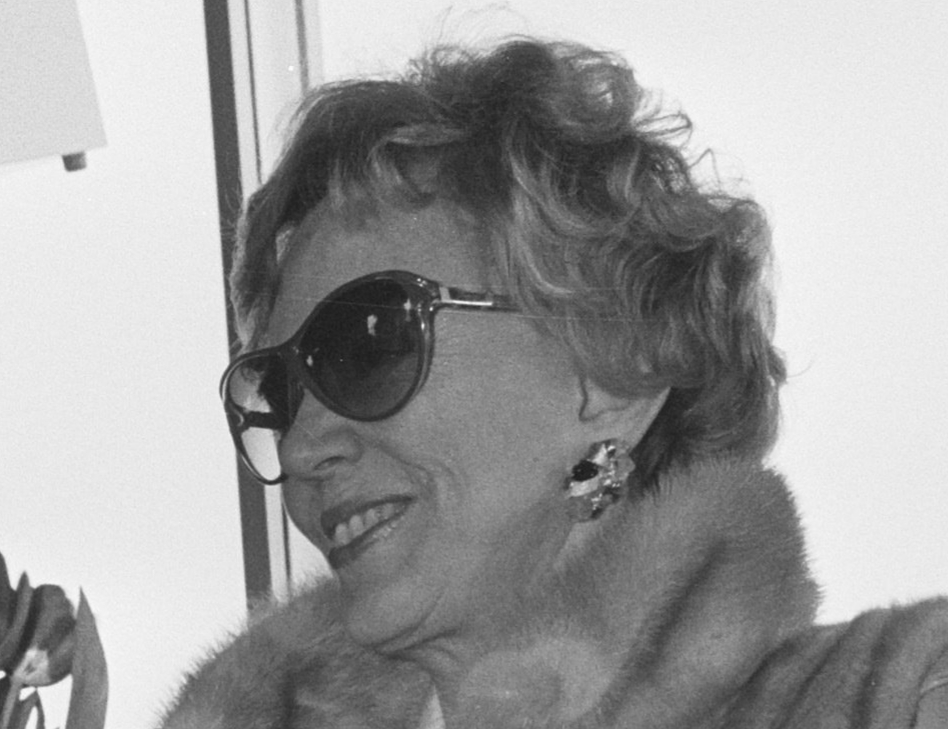
- Papandreou in 1987

Spouse of the Prime Minister of Greece
- In role 21 October 1981 – 9 June 1989
- Prime Minister: Andreas Papandreou
- Preceded by: Lena Ralli
- Succeeded by: Maria Tzannetaki

Personal details
- Born: Margaret Esther Chant; 30 September 1923 Oak Park, Illinois, U.S.
- Died: 18 September 2026 (aged 102) Palaio Faliro, Greece
- Resting place: Aegean Sea , Greece
- Citizenship: United States (until 1961); Greece (from 1961)
- Party: PASOK
- Spouse: Andreas Papandreou (m. 1951; div. 1989)
- Children: 4, including George and Nikos
- Education: University of Minnesota (B.J., MPH)
- Website: ege.gr

Margaret Papandreou (Greek: Μαργαρίτα Παπανδρέου; née Margaret Esther Chant, Greek: Μάργκαρετ Έσθερ Τσαντ; 30 September 1923 – 18 September 2026) was an American and Greek women's rights activist and writer. She was the former wife of the former Prime Minister of Greece Andreas Papandreou. Among her children are the former Prime Minister of Greece George Papandreou and the member of the European Parliament Nikos Papandreou.

== Early life ==
Margaret Esther Chant was born on 30 September 1923 in Oak Park, Illinois, and grew up in Elmhurst, Illinois. She was the eldest of five children of Douglas Chant (1896–1981), and Hulda Anne Pfund Chant (1893–1986). Her father's parents were from England and her mother's were from Switzerland. She first studied journalism and gained her master's degree in public health at the University of Minnesota. During her master's studies she met her future husband Andreas Papandreou in a dentist's waiting room in 1948.

== Career ==
Papandreou was the President of the Greek Women's Union, a Greek independent feminist organization. She was also the author of several books and a columnist.

She was an important participant in the struggle for women's rights, as she played a leading role in the creation, elaboration and promotion of laws that greatly improved the legal and social position of Greek women, such as the abolition of the dowry institution (1982), the legalization of abortion (1986), the establishment of civil marriage (1982), the legalization of divorce by mutual consent, the possibility of women retaining their surnames after their marriage and obtaining equal rights with the husband in the custody of their children.

== Lagarde list ==
In December 2012, the newspapers To Vima and Proto Thema claimed in their publications that Papandreou owned one of the accounts on the Lagarde list.

On 14 October 2014, the Economic Crimes Enforcement Agency (SDOE) officially responded with a letter to Papandreou that, following an investigation carried out in the context of a lawsuit filed by M. Papandreou, her name is not included on the Lagarde list. The document was signed by the special secretary of SDOE, Stylianos Stasinopoulos.

== Personal life and death ==
Chant married Andreas Papandreou on 30 August 1951. They initially lived in Minnesota and later in California, where Papandreou was Chair of the Department of Economics at the University of California, Berkeley. With Papandreou she had four children, including George and Nikos.

In June 1989, Papandreou agreed to grant a divorce so that Andreas Papandreou could marry Dimitra Liani.

Papandreou turned 100 on 30 September 2023, and died at her home in Palaio Faliro on 18 September 2026, at age 102. Her civil funeral took place on 20 September 2026 at the First Cemetery of Athens. Her body was cremated on 21 September 2026 at Ritsona Crematorium, and her ashes were scattered in the Aegean Sea.
