= Andreas Papandreou =

Prime Minister of Greece (1981–1989; 1993–1996)

- Ανδρέας Παπανδρέου
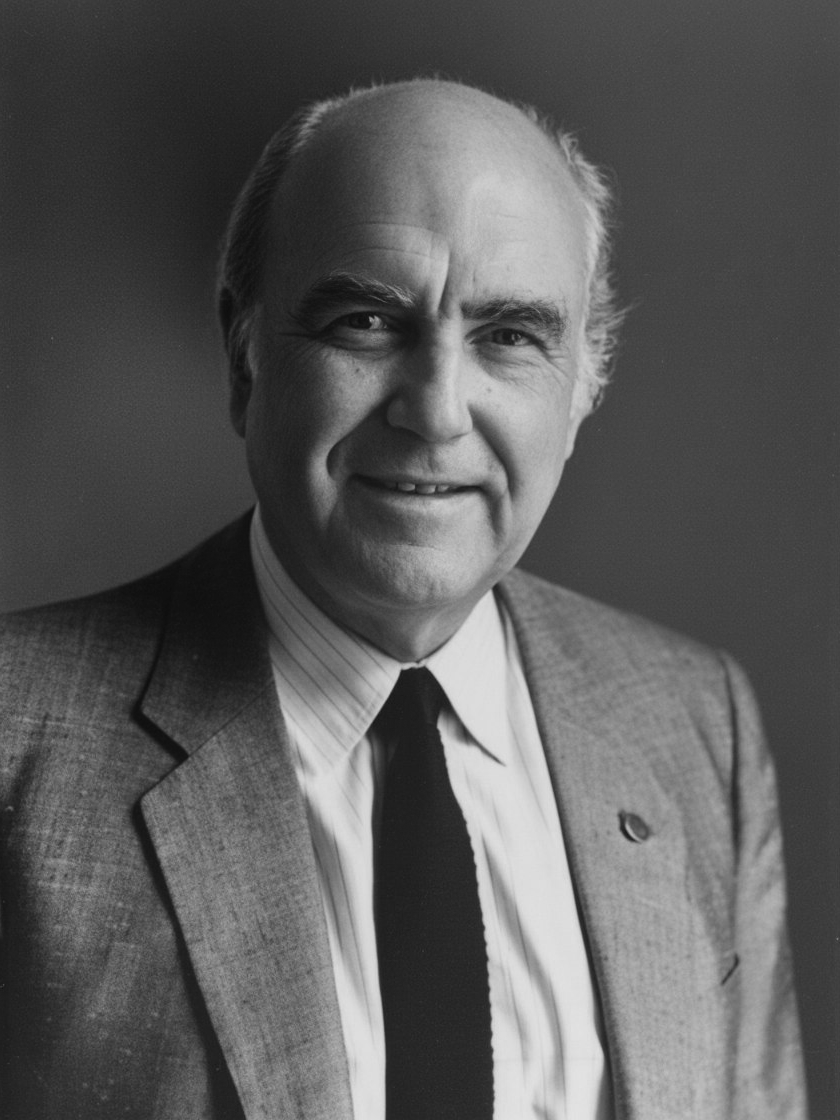
- Papandreou in 1981

Prime Minister of Greece
- In office 13 October 1993 – 22 January 1996
- President: Konstantinos Karamanlis; Konstantinos Stephanopoulos
- Preceded by: Konstantinos Mitsotakis
- Succeeded by: Costas Simitis
- In office 21 October 1981 – 2 July 1989
- President: Konstantinos Karamanlis; Ioannis Alevras (acting); Christos Sartzetakis
- Preceded by: Georgios Rallis
- Succeeded by: Tzannis Tzannetakis

Leader of the Opposition
- In office 11 April 1990 – 13 October 1993
- Prime Minister: Konstantinos Mitsotakis
- Preceded by: Himself (1989)
- Succeeded by: Konstantinos Mitsotakis
- In office 2 July 1989 – 12 October 1989
- Prime Minister: Tzannis Tzannetakis
- Preceded by: Konstantinos Mitsotakis
- Succeeded by: Himself (1990)
- In office 28 November 1977 – 21 October 1981
- Prime Minister: Konstantinos Karamanlis; Georgios Rallis
- Preceded by: Georgios Mavros
- Succeeded by: Georgios Rallis

President of the Panhellenic Socialist Movement
- In office 3 September 1974 – 23 June 1996
- Preceded by: Position established
- Succeeded by: Costas Simitis
Ministerial offices
Minister of National Defence
In office 21 October 1981 – 25 April 1986
Prime Minister	Himself
Preceded by	Evangelos Averoff
Succeeded by	Ioannis Charalambopoulos
Provisional Minister for Northern Greece
In office 5 June 1985 – 26 July 1985
Prime Minister	Himself
Preceded by	Vasilios Intzes
Succeeded by	Ioannis Papadopoulos
Minister of the Presidency
In office 19 February 1964 – 5 June 1964
Prime Minister	Georgios Papandreou
Preceded by	Dionysios Zakythinos
Succeeded by	Dimitrios Papaspirou

Member of the Hellenic Parliament
- In office 17 November 1974 – 23 June 1996
- In office 16 February 1964 – 21 April 1967

Personal details
- Born: Andreas Georgiou Papandreou; 5 February 1919 Chios, Greece
- Died: 23 June 1996 (aged 77) Athens, Greece
- Party: PASOK
- Spouses: Christina Rasia (m. 1941; div. 1951) Margaret Chant (m. 1951; div. 1989) Dimitra Liani (m. 1989)
- Children: 5, including George and Nikos
- Parent: Georgios Papandreou (father)
- Education: University of Athens; Harvard University
- Awards: Knight Grand Cross of the Order of Isabella the Catholic (1983); Star of People's Friendship (1985)
- Website: Andreas G. Papandreou Foundation

Military service
- Branch/service: United States Navy

Andreas Georgiou Papandreou (Greek: Ανδρέας Γεωργίου Παπανδρέου, pronounced [anˈðreas papanˈðreu]; 5 February 1919 – 23 June 1996) was a Greek academic and economist who was prime minister of Greece from 1981 to 1989 and again from 1993 to 1996. He founded PASOK, the Panhellenic Socialist Movement.

Born in Chios, Papandreou was the son of prime minister Georgios Papandreou. In 1938, Papandreou left Greece for the United States to escape the 4th of August Regime and became a prominent academic. He returned to Greece in 1959 after years of resisting his father's entreaties to prepare him as successor. After joining the now-ruling Centre Union party in 1963, Papandreou's rapid ascension during his father's premiership, together with his uncompromising radical rhetoric, amplified Greece's post–Civil War political instability leading to Iouliana, which created the conditions for a group of colonels to stage a coup d'état followed by a seven-year junta. Papandreou was imprisoned, then exiled by the Junta, while many politicians, including his father, blamed him as responsible for the fall of democracy. In exile, Papandreou developed and spread an anti-American, conspiratorial narrative in which he and his father were victims of the Greek right-wing establishment supported by the United States.

In 1974, Papandreou founded PASOK, the first organized Greek democratic socialist party. Papandreou's populist rhetoric resonated with the Greek people who sought a change from the politics of the past and the 1970s energy crisis. PASOK won the 1981 elections and Papandreou implemented a transformative social agenda, expanding access to education and healthcare, reinforcing workers' rights, and passing a new family law that elevated the position of women in society and the economy. In 1982, he secured official recognition of all the resistance groups, including EAM-ELAS and the return of Greek communist refugees of the Civil War. His governance was tarnished by numerous corruption scandals, a soft stance on terrorism, democratic backsliding, a public divorce and subsequent marriage to an air stewardess half his age, controversial foreign policy decisions, and a constitutional crisis which he had instigated. Under Papandreou, the Greek economy diverged from the European average because of large-scale patronage, misuse of European Union funds, and excessive foreign borrowing, which resulted in Greece earning the reputation of Europe's "black sheep" and "lost cause".

Papandreou resigned from the premiership in January 1996 due to ill health and died in June of that year. He transformed Greece's post-junta liberal democracy into a populist democracy that continued after his death, including his administrations. His eldest son, George Papandreou, became the leader of PASOK in February 2004 and served as prime minister from 2009 to 2011.

== Personal life and family ==
Papandreou was born on 5 February 1919 on the Greek island of Chios, the son of Zofia (Sofia) Mineyko and Greek liberal politician and future prime minister George Papandreou. His maternal grandfather was Polish-Lithuanian-born public figure Zygmunt Mineyko, and his maternal grandmother was Greek. He attended Athens College, a private school in Greece, then the National and Kapodistrian University of Athens from 1937 until 1938. During the dictatorship led by Ioannis Metaxas, he was arrested for purported Trotskyism. Following representation in court by his father, Papandreou gained an exit visa through family connections, and went to New York. From there, he asked for political asylum based on the imprisonment by the Metaxas regime.

Papandreou married Christina Rasia in 1941. In 1948, he entered into a relationship with Margaret Chant, a journalism student at University of Minnesota where he was a professor. He obtained a divorce from his spouse in 1951 and married Chant later that year. They had three sons and a daughter. Papandreou also had, with Swedish actress and TV presenter Ragna Nyblom, a daughter out of wedlock, Emilia Nyblom, who was born in 1969 in Sweden. Papandreou divorced Chant in 1989 and married Dimitra Liani, who was 37 years his junior.

Papandreou died on 23 June 1996. The government declared four days of national mourning, and at his funeral procession produced crowds of "hundreds of thousands." His will shocked the public because he left everything to his 41-year-old third wife and left nothing to his family by the second wife, their four children, or his illegitimate Swedish daughter.

== Academic career ==
In 1943, Papandreou received a PhD degree in economics from Harvard University. Afterwards, he served in the U.S. Navy and qualified as a hospital corpsman at the Bethesda Naval Hospital. Papandreou's skills in maths were recognized by an American admiral, who placed him in a statistical control unit planning the Okinawa invasion. He returned to Harvard in 1946 as a student advisor until 1947, when he received an assistant professorship at the University of Minnesota. Papandreou became a visiting professor at Northwestern University for 1950–1951. In 1956, he accepted a tenured teaching position at the University of California, Berkeley, where he later became the Department of Economics chair. While in exile, Papandreou worked at Stockholm University for a year and then at York University in Toronto until 1974.

== Political career ==
=== Pre-Junta era (1959–1967) ===
==== Entry into politics ====
While he was chair of the department at Berkeley, Papandreou was pressured by his father to return to Greece to prepare him as his successor. He returned to Greece in 1959 and headed an economic development research program by invitation of Prime Minister Konstantinos Karamanlis. In 1960, he began leading the Athens Economic Research Center and advising the Bank of Greece.

Papandreou developed an ideology shaped by the progressive liberalism from his years in the U.S., aiming to gain support from the non-communist, left-leaning electorate. He viewed this as the only viable path to help his father ascend to prime minister. His vision called for social and economic modernization, pursued through the creation of a mass-based political party. American officials hoped that Papandreou would be a stabilizing force in Greek politics. He received funding from the Ford Foundation and Rockefeller Foundation to promote projects aligned to liberal internationalism. He later moved away from progressive liberalism and adopted a populist rhetoric, in which the king, the armed forces, and the Americans are described as having "vested interests" that are not in the best interests of Greece.

==== Center Union rise and conflicts ====
The 1963 Greek legislative election brought his father, head of the Center Union, to the prime minister. Papandreou became chief economic advisor, renounced his American citizenship, and was elected to the Greek Parliament in the 1964 Greek legislative election. He then became the assistant to the Prime Minister and leader of the party's left wing. Papandreou's rapid ascension, orchestrated by his father, created displeasure among Center Union party members. The discontent of Center Union members increased as Papandreou's influence grew and his father started to ignore his own Cabinet on critical political decisions.

Papandreous advocated for the liberalization of the rapidly urbanizing Greek society, resulting in large salary increases for police, judges, and teachers. Resentment towards the Papandreous grew among the military as they were excluded from salary increases. The Papandreous made a faint attempt to gain military control, which alarmed officers without weakening them. The latter created friction with the king, who wanted to remain in command of the army. The Papandreous also released all the political prisoners towards healing wounds from the Civil War.

In foreign policy, Papandreou criticized the presence of American military and intelligence in Greece by describing Greece as a U.S. colony and publicly taking a neutral stand in the Cold War. Papandreou's rhetoric intensified after his father's visit as Prime Minister to Washington DC with President Johnson in July 1964 to discuss the Cyprus dispute. This criticism became politically turbulent with his interview on 4 October, resulting in his sudden but temporary resignation.

==== Disturbing the political balance ====
Papandreou's public attacks against the king and the Americans disturbed the political balance. Conservatives feared that Papandreou was a secret Communist, leading them to another civil war. The U.S. embassy officials, sensitive to these public attacks during the Cold War, and his father repeatedly requested Papandreou tone down his rhetoric. Andreas continued actively campaigning, further deepening divisions and prolonging the political instability in the pre-1967 coup period.

Weeks before the coup, his father apologized to the U.S. ambassador Phillips Talbot for his son's behavior, explaining that his son "would like nothing better than to be arrested" as he would "relish the role of martyr," and that if he were not his son, then he would have been expelled from Center Union. Papandreou became the target of ultra-rightists who feared that his nearly 80-year-old father would win the next election, but Andreas would be the actual focus of power in the party.

==== Iouliana ====
In 1965, Papandreou was accused in the Aspida case within the Hellenic Army. His father removed the defense minister and assumed the post himself and the Center Union party introduced legislation to extend parliamentary immunity to include the period between the dissolution of the old Parliament and elections. Both measures have been characterized by scholars as ways to protect his son from investigations. King Konstantine II of Greece refused to endorse the removal of the defense minister since this would create a conflict of interest, which forced George Papandreou's resignation; the events following this became known as Iouliana. For the next twenty-two months, there was no elected government, and hundreds of demonstrations took place, with many injured and killed in clashes with the police. The King convinced 45 Center Union party members to support him and his bid to form a government, who were rejected and called apostates by those supporting Papandreous.

To end the political deadlock, his father attempted a more moderate approach with the King; in March 1967, Papandreou publicly rejected his father's effort and attacked the whole establishment, preventing any compromise. This attracted the support of 41 members of the Center Union, aimed at securing the party's leadership. As the politicians were unable to sort out their differences, on 21 April 1967 anti-Communist Colonels led the Greek military junta of 1967–1974.

=== Junta and exile (1967–1974) ===
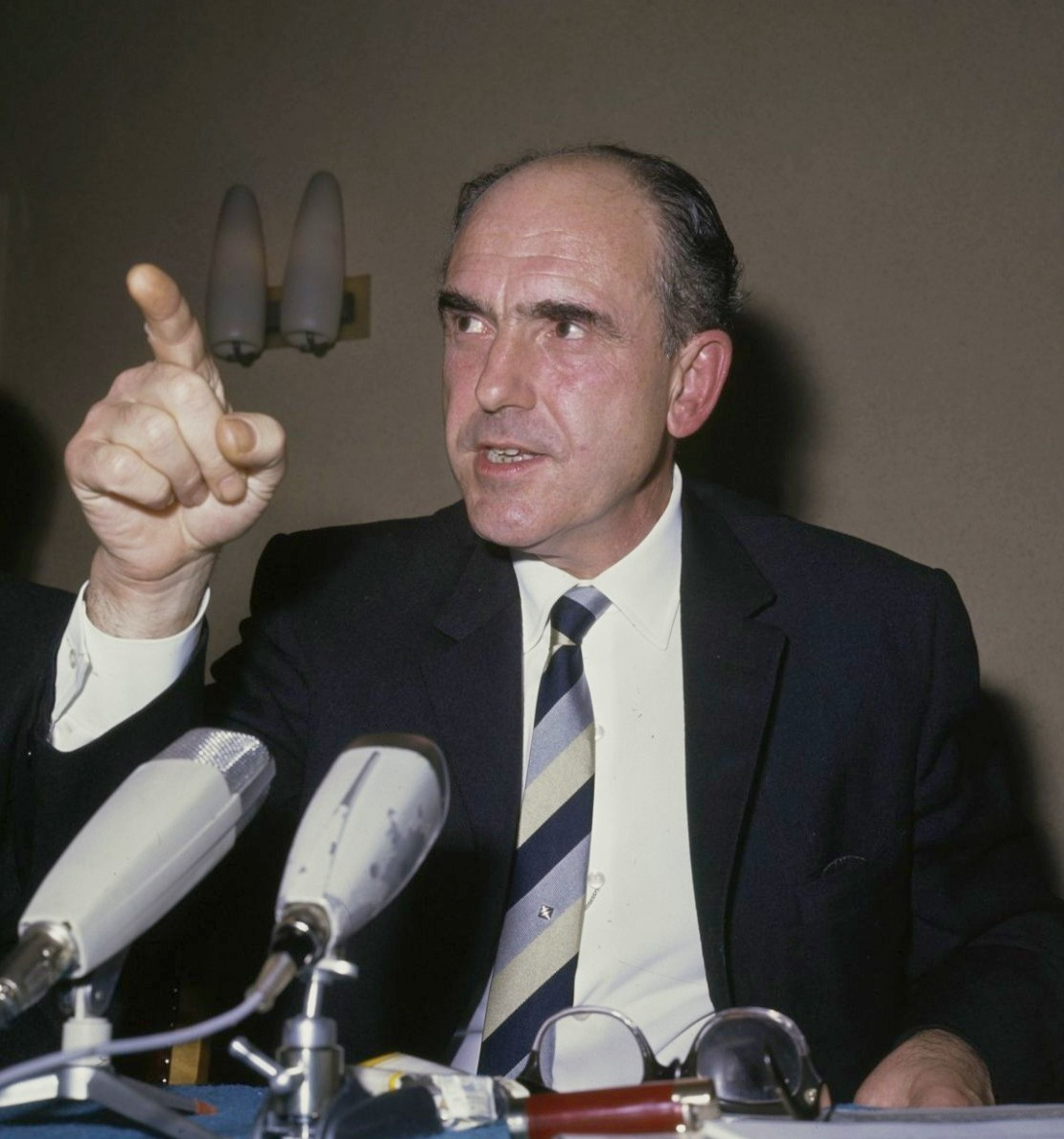
Andreas Papandreou in 1968

When the Regime of the Colonels seized power in April 1967, Papandreou was captured and charged with treason. His political colleagues, including his father, blamed him as the person responsible for the fall of Greek democracy. Gust Avrakotos, a Greek-American Central Intelligence Agency (CIA) case officer assigned to Athens, told the Colonels that the U.S. Government wished for Papandreou to be allowed to leave the country with his family. Unofficially, Avrakotos warned them that he would return if they did not execute him. Under heavy pressure from American officials and academics, the military regime released Papandreou on Christmas Day 1967 on condition that he leave the country. He then moved to Sweden with his wife, four children, and mother, where he accepted a post for one year at Stockholm University. Afterward, he moved to Toronto, where he stayed until 1974.

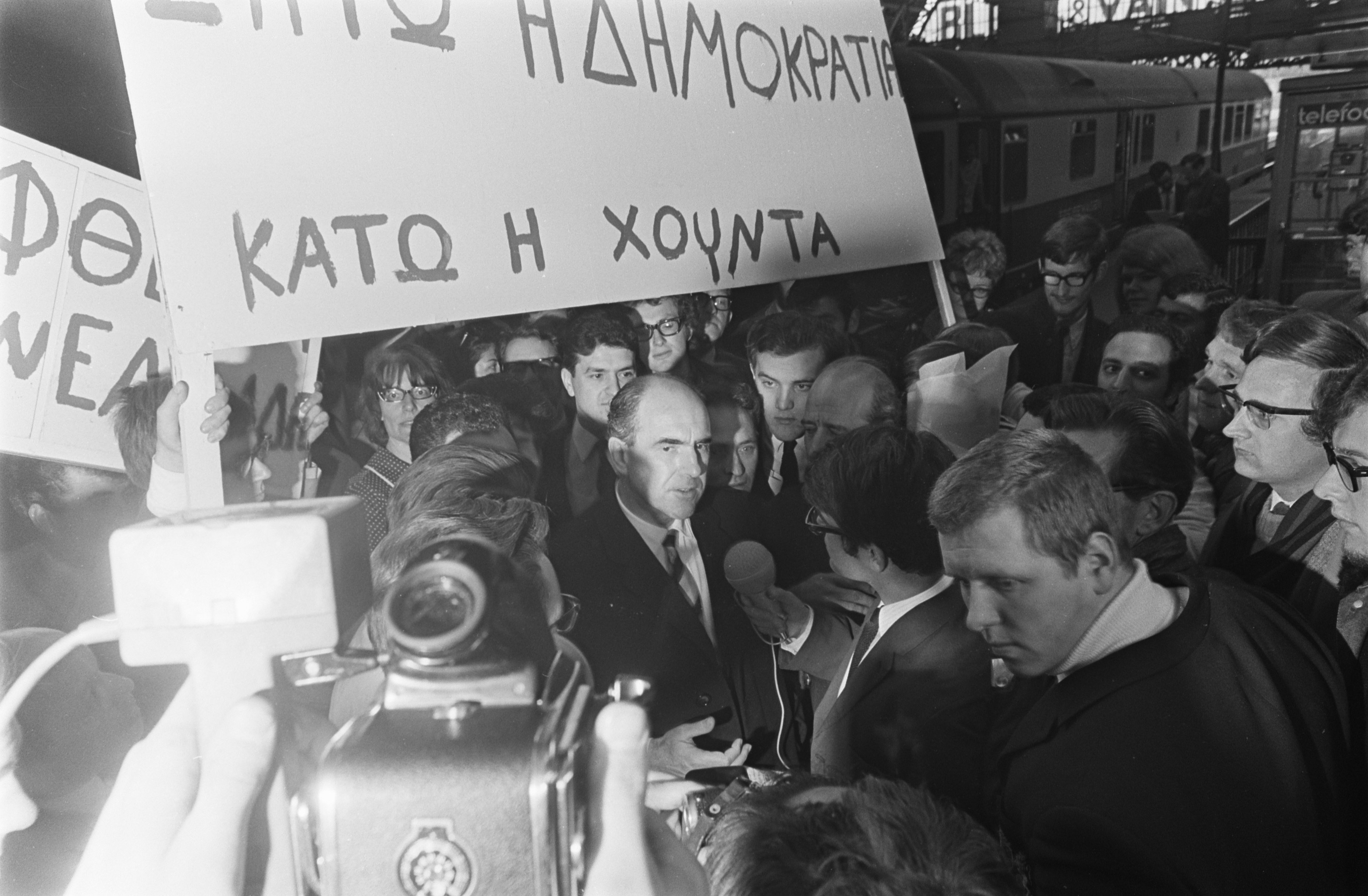
Andreas Papandreou in an anti-dictatorial rally, Netherlands, 1968

In exile, Papandreou was excluded from the political forces seeking to restore democracy in Greece. He actively campaigned, using his American connections, to push for U.S. intervention against the junta, but later reversed his stance and supported military resistance instead. Papandreou accused the CIA of being responsible for the 1967 coup and was critical of the U.S. administration, calling Greece a U.S. "colony" and a Cold War "garrison state." In 1968, Papandreou formed an anti-dictatorship organization, the Panhellenic Liberation Movement (PAK), which sought to overthrow the military regime. Reacting to the creation of PAK, his father stated, "Political leaders do not head up conspiratorial organizations" and urged his son to work within the Central Union party. His father died in 1968, and Papandreou was not allowed by the junta regime to attend his father's funeral.

=== Return to Greece, Restoration of democracy (1974–1981) ===
==== Establishing PASOK ====
We are announcing today the inauguration of a new political movement, a movement which we believe represents the desires of and needs of the average Greek: the farmer, the worker, the craftsman, the salaried worker, and our courageous and enlightened youth. The movement belongs to them, and we will call on every exploited Greek to strengthen our ranks, to form cadres and participate in the molding of the movement in order to promote our national independence, popular sovereignty, social liberation, and democracy in all phases of public life.

— Papandreou announcing the creation of the Panhellenic Socialist Movement on 3 September 1974.

The logo of PASOK in the elections of 1981

Papandreou returned to Greece after the fall of the junta in 1974. The dominant and leading political figure in Greece was Karamanlis with the New Democracy political party; Papandreou continued to have the stigma of past events. On 6 August 1974, Papandreou dissolved PAK in Winterthur, Switzerland, without announcing it publicly. He rejected the leadership of his father's old party, which had evolved into Centre Union – New Forces, and his father's ideological heritage as a Venizelist liberal, declaring himself a democratic socialist. On 3 September 1974, he established the Panhellenic Socialist Movement (PASOK) party. Most former PAK members and other leftist groups joined the new party. Its founding charter advocated social liberation, a radical shift in foreign policy, Greece's withdrawal from North Atlantic Treaty Organization (NATO), the closure of the U.S. military bases, and rejection of the option of membership in the European Economic Community (EEC), which was dismissed as a capitalist construct. In the 1974 elections, PASOK received 13.5% of the vote.

==== Opposition to the Constitution and rise in popularity ====
A new Constitution, adopted by Parliament and promulgated on 11 June 1975, established a parliamentary republic with a president as head of state. While the majority of powers resided with the prime minister, the president had sufficient powers to safeguard the constitution. Papandreou boycotted the promulgation of the constitution and described it as "totalitarian," advocating instead for a "socialist" constitution without explaining what he meant. Papandreou's attacks intensified upon the initiation of talks for the entry of Greece into the EEC, accusing the Greek political establishment of "national betrayal."

Papandreou salvaged his political career by doubling down on his polarizing pre-junta-developed ideology, combining it with nationalist elements. This was assisted by three major events: the U.S. interactions with the junta after the coup and the Turkish invasion of Cyprus, which, in his view, reinforced the conspiratorial involvement of the U.S. in the Colonels' junta, the oil crisis in 1973 and 1979, which negatively affected the Greek economy, and Karamanlis's election to President of Greece in 1980, leaving a power vacuum in the upcoming 1981 elections. Papandreou promised wide-ranging (and sometimes unrealistic) changes, encapsulated in PASOK's slogan "Change" (Greek: Αλλαγή), which resonated with Greeks who sought a break from past politics. In the 1977 elections, PASOK received 25.3% of the vote, nearly doubling its size from 1974, and Papandreou became the leader of the opposition.

==== Greece's entry in EEC ====
Papandreou's positions, along with his rising popularity, renewed fears of another military coup among the Right and Greece's allies. After the 1977 elections, Karamanlis toured the European capitals, urging for Greece's quicker entry into the EEC, hoping it would reduce the temptation for military intervention if Papandreou implemented his promises once in power. Foreign leaders agreed with Karamanlis on a plan for Greece's entry into the EEC.

Papandreou softened his tone without abandoning his initial positions. He called for a referendum regarding the entry to EEC after 1977 as he was trying to win a crucial share of the vote from the centrist Union of the Democratic Centre after its disintegration following the 1977 elections, and the entry to EEC was becoming popular among the Greeks. Legislation to ratify the entry to EEC was passed in the Greek Parliament on 28 June 1979, with PASOK leaving the chamber. Greece entered the EEC in January 1981. In the elections of October 1981, Papandreou won with 48.1% of the vote.

=== Leading the "Change" (1981–1985) ===
Our basic target is a self-sufficient economic and social development, using all the productive forces in combination with a fairer distribution of the national income and wealth... We seek the gradual reform of the structures of the economy so that the basic economic choices are made by the society as a whole. The strategic sectors of the economy must come under substantial social control without overlooking the positive role of private initiative. The crisis in the capitalist system on a world scale, with ever-increasing unemployment and inflation, intensified international competition, the increase in the degree of concentration and the monopolistic structure of many branches, have made the traditional means of economic policy ineffective.

— Papandreou, in his first appearance in the Greek Parliament as the prime minister on 22 November 1981.

After the 1981 election, Papandreou's PASOK was the first non-communist party with a mass-based organization, causing more people to participate in political and social institutions. By the end of his first term, Papandreou moderated his approach by making considerable U-turns, either by choice or governmental dysfunction.

==== European Economic Community ====
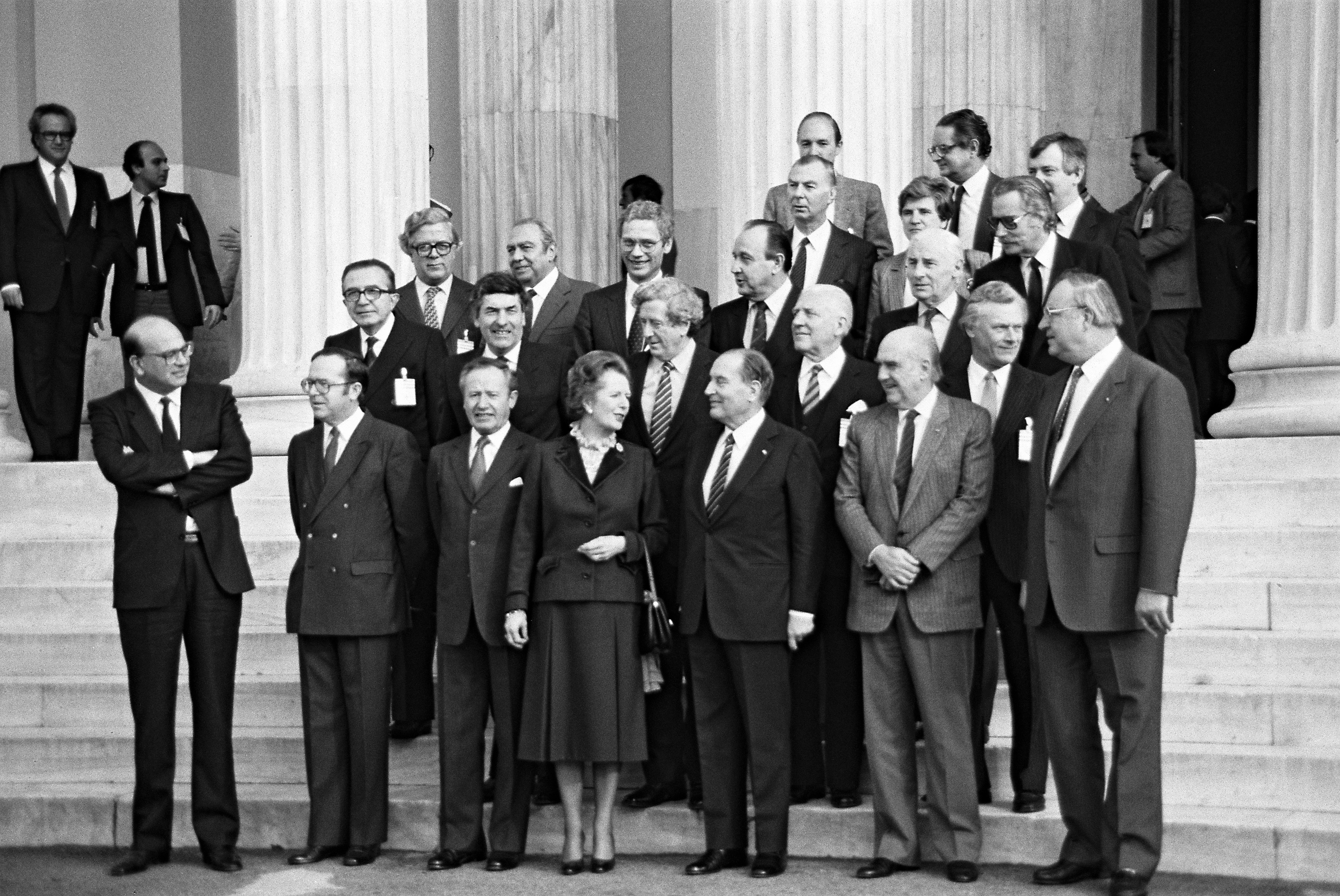
Andreas Papandreou in Athens European Council – 1983. (1st row L-R) Bettino Craxi, Wilfried Martens, Gaston Thorn, Margaret Thatcher, François Mitterrand, Andreas Papandreou, and Helmut Kohl

Papandreou dropped his campaign pledge to hold a referendum on EEC membership and submitted a memorandum of demands to the EEC in March 1982. The memorandum asked for special treatment and financial support based on Greece's unique characteristics. EEC delayed its response until after the date by which Greece could opt out of its entry into the EEC, then rejected the Greek memorandum in March 1983. However, the EEC promised support via the newly created "Integrated Mediterranean Programs", and Papandreou declared victory. Greece began to become increasingly dependent on EEC funding, reaching 4.5% of Greece's GDP by 1989. In March 1985, Papandreou stated that Greece would remain in the EEC for the foreseeable future because "the cost of leaving would be much higher than the cost of staying," prompting no reaction from within the party.

==== Economy in the early 1980s ====
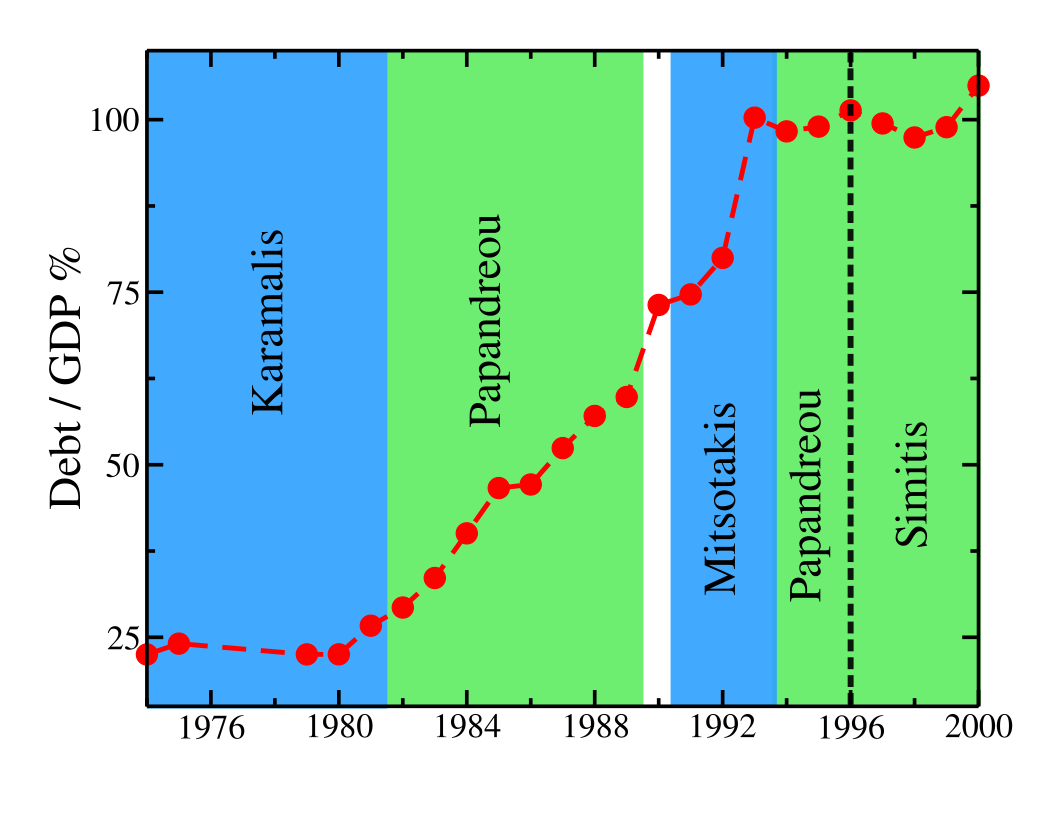
Greek debt over GDP (%) in 1974–2000 period. The colored regions approximately highlight the prime minister's reigns; for 1989–1990, there was no stable government due to Papandreou's change in electoral law. In 1981, Papandreou altered the course of the economy by increasing its dependence on foreign borrowing. The dataset is from the International Monetary Fund website .

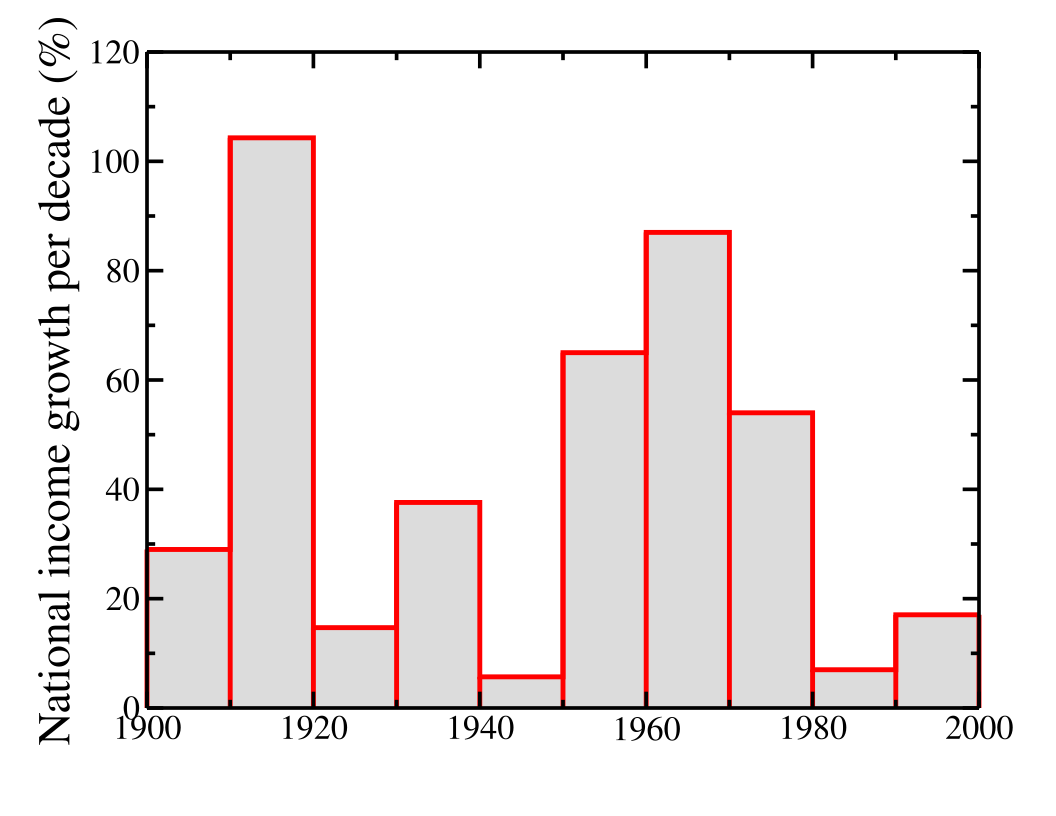
Greek National Income per decade for 1900–2000. During Papandreou's tenure from 1981 to 1989, the national income increased at approximately the same rate as it did during the turbulent decade of 1941–1950. Source: The Bank of Greece and National Statistical Service, various open source bulletins and reports.

Papandreou's government introduced wealth redistribution policies. Public pension spending nearly doubled from 1980 to 1985, while manufacturing wages rose by 10% and the minimum wage jumped 32% in 1982. Social welfare, healthcare, and insurance spending increased, credit became more accessible, and labor laws were strengthened. A national unemployment support system was established, and public consumption and investment grew by 7% and 10%, respectively, between 1982 and 1985.

Papandreou's pro-worker policies, combined with anti-capitalist rhetoric that hindered foreign investment and a failure to address stagflation, burdened companies in Greece. They already faced competitiveness issues and declining profits due to the 1970s oil crises and they were now exposed to European competition. Several multi-national companies left Greece, such as Esso, Ethyl, Pirelli, and Goodyear. Shipyards and associated industries employing thousands of workers closed. Companies not already bankrupt encouraged early retirement, further burdening the Greek state, which had to assist the insurance funds. In 1983, PASOK nationalized numerous industries by establishing a restructuring business agency called "Industrial Reconstruction Organisation." These companies continued to operate at a loss without increasing productivity, turning nationalization into patronage. Agriculture also struggled, as Greece shifted from a trade surplus in agricultural products to a deficit by 1986, partly due to an artificial increase of wages that led to labor shortages. Papandreou recognized the lack of productivity and increased trade deficits, admitting that "we consume more than we produce."

Nationalization added to Greece's debt, with the Bank of Greece on the brink of collapse. Recovery started when EEC support began in Greece, but growth was sluggish due to corruption and clientelism. Unemployment rose sharply from 2.8% in 1980 to approximately 8% by the end of his first term. Papandreou did not introduce progressive tax reform to increase the state's revenues to address the increasing budget deficits due to his policies, and instead used foreign loans. The foreign debt increase caused external debt interest payments to rise from 2.5% of GDP in 1980 to 5.4% of GDP in 1986, more than defense and education combined in his second administration.

==== Foreign policy, NATO, and Turkey ====
After taking office, Papandreou assumed the Ministry of Defense, a typical move in times of war, due to fears of another coup. This made various leaders in the NATO alliance uncomfortable in dealing with Papandreou. In December 1981, at the NATO Defence Planning Committee, Papandreou demanded NATO guarantees against Turkey, a NATO ally, stating that they were a bigger threat to Greece than the Soviet countries. The NATO meeting concluded without publishing a press release for the first time. While this displeased Greece's allies, Papandreou reinforced his image as a patriot in the eyes of concerned Greek voters and military wary of Turkey. Despite efforts to appease the military, Papandreou struggled with discipline as two so-called "readiness exercises" in 1982 and 1983, both followed by forced resignations, were likely failed coup attempts.

Papandreou maintained high military spending levels, at 6.7% of GDP in 1982, pleasing the Greek military at the expense of the economy. In 1985, his government bought 40 American F-16 and 40 French Mirage 2000 aircraft at the cost of US$2 billion, committing Greece's defense to long-term dependence on French and American technology. The purchase size was unusual given the status of the Greek economy, described in the press as the "purchase of the century" (Greek: η αγορά του αιώνα).

Despite Papandreou's campaign promise to immediately remove U.S. military bases from Greece once in power, the country remained firmly within NATO. This reversal required navigation between domestic expectations—shaped by over a decade of anti-American rhetoric—and geopolitical realities, as removing the bases would have elevated Turkey's strategic value within the NATO alliance. In the 1983 agreement, all four U.S. bases established since 1952 remained in Greece for an additional five years, accompanied by increased military aid—but no guarantees against Turkish aggression. Papandreou claimed the deal included a provision for base removal after 1988, granted Greece greater control over foreign bases, and secured U.S. military aid under the 7/10 ratio with Turkey. These statements were inaccurate, yet the treaty documents were withheld from the public for two months to sideline the opposition. Afterward, it was revealed that the agreement was nearly identical to his predecessor's beyond minor symbolic concessions.

Within the wider Arab–Israeli conflict, Papandreou distanced himself from the EEC's desire to see the establishment of full diplomatic relations between Greece and Israel, as well as other Camp David initiatives. Moreover, he sought to improve relations with Arab states and was a vocal advocate of the Palestinian cause. The focus on Greek–Palestinian relations was facilitated by leftist ideology, anti-American sentiment, and the support that the Palestine Liberation Organization extended to the Kurdistan Workers' Party, an adversary of Turkey and therefore a potential ally of Greece.

==== Social reforms ====
From 1974 to 1981, Greece's healthcare system lagged between Northern Europe and the south. Both major parties aimed to improve access, especially in rural areas, focusing on universal access and prevention. When PASOK came to power, Papandreou launched the National Healthcare System (ESY) in 1983, modeled after the UK's National Health Service. While it improved access and expanded infrastructure, reforms were hindered by doctor shortages, union resistance, and budget constraints. Doctors opposed giving up private practice, and loopholes allowed informal payments and unauthorized private work. The partial implementation created long-term problems and failed to fully implement a socialist healthcare vision.

In education, Papandreou expanded access, abolished entrance exams, removed classical language requirements, and promoted democratic school administration. Vocational training also improved. While university attendance doubled, underfunding, declining standards, and politicization of schools led to quality issues. Promotions were based on seniority and not on merit, school inspectors were removed or forced to retire, and political favoritism influenced staffing. Public schools declined, and private tutoring and foreign education became widespread.

The 1975 Greek Constitution guaranteed equality under the law for men and women and equal pay, but many pre-junta laws were outdated. Greek law was also expected to align with European standards under the Treaty of Rome and women's advocacy groups emerged. In the 1980s, Papandreou introduced reforms, emphasizing individuals over the family and reducing Church and state control over private life: legalizing civil marriage, abolishing dowries, decriminalizing adultery, and legalizing abortion. Maternity and parental leave policies improved, and women entered education institutions and the workforce in greater numbers, though under-representation in politics persisted. Total fertility rate fell from 2.2 in 1980 to 1.4 in 1989, causing long-term population decline.

Post-1974 governments aimed to heal the Civil War divisions. Papandreou removed security screenings in 1982, restored pensions for politically dismissed civil servants in 1985, and granted war veteran status to leftist resistance fighters in August 1982, effectively formally recognising the entirety of the Greek Resistance. At the parliamentary process for the latter, New Democracy deputies overwhelmingly abstained, except for former Prime Minister Panagiotis Kanellopoulos, who crossed party lines and supported the recognition vote. Furthermore, all formal Civil War commemorations were abolished, including ceremonies commemorating Dekemvriana. Papandreou touted this as "the gravestone of the spirit of national division"; New Democracy deputies, many of whose senior members were participants in the Civil War, denounced these actions as a "shameless attempt to whitewash the communist crimes during and after the war."

==== Constitutional crisis of 1985 and elections ====
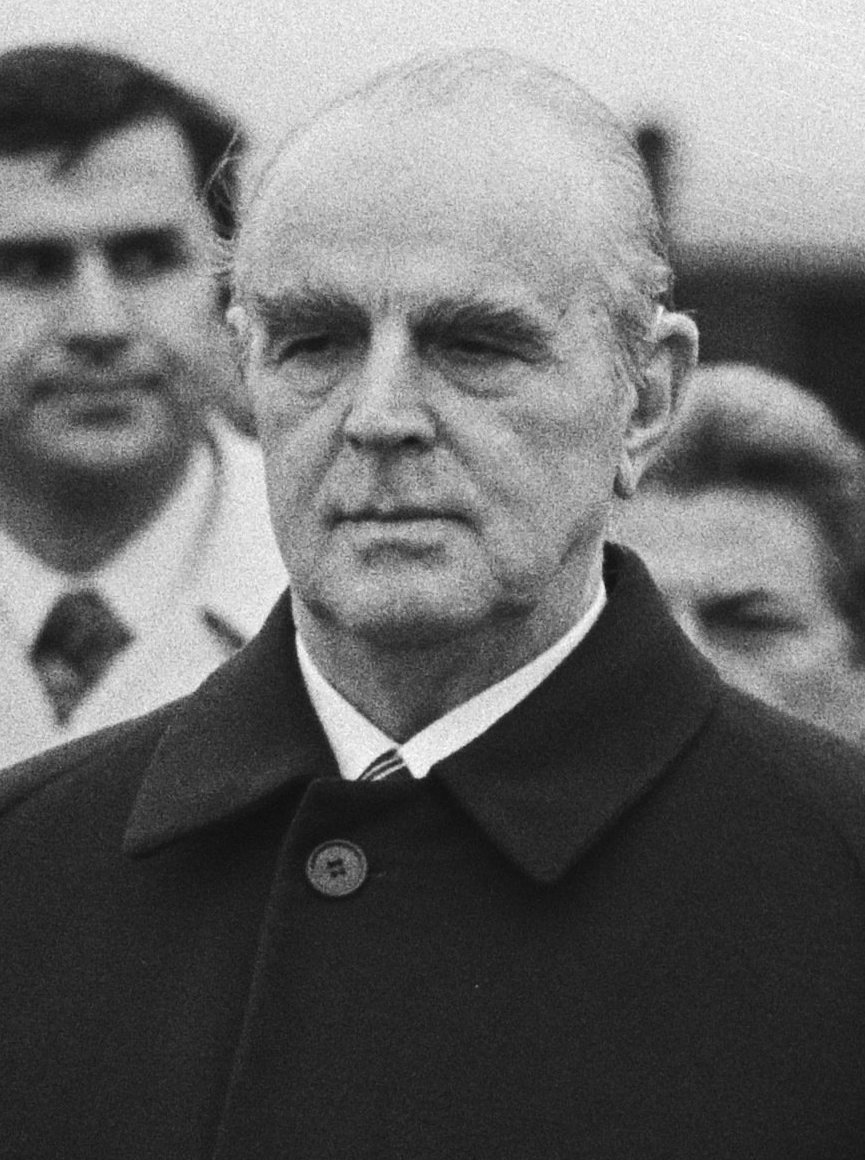
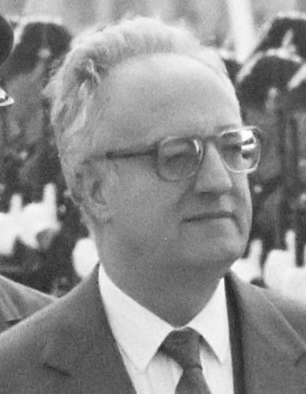
Presidents of the Hellenic Republic, Konstantinos Karamanlis (left) and Christos Sartzetakis (right).

On 6 March 1985, Papandreou nominated Christos Sartzetakis, a Supreme Court judge favored by the Left, for president—despite earlier signaling support for incumbent Karamanlis. Simultaneously, Papandreou proposed constitutional reforms to reduce presidential powers, arguing against Karamanlis overseeing reforms to a constitution he helped craft. Karamanlis resigned two weeks before the termination of his term, and acting president Ioannis Alevras of PASOK took over.

Sartzetakis faced tense parliamentary votes, with opposition leader Mitsotakis accusing Papandreou of violating constitutional protocols. Mitsotakis and Papandreou had an oral confrontation, with Mitsotakis accusing Papandreou of a lack of respect for the parliament, and Papandreou countering that Mitsotakis did not have the moral authority to speak about respect, invoking memories from Iouliana. Sartzetakis was elected in the third round with Alevras casting the decisive vote. Mitsotakis declared the vote illegitimate, which deepened Greece's constitutional crisis. Karamanlis warned of national "confusion and uncertainty"; state media controlled by the governing party suppressed Karamanlis's comments. The polarized confrontation continued into the election campaign.

Papandreou won the June 1985 elections, benefiting from increased support on the far Left from the instigated crisis. Mitsotakis accepted Sartzetakis as president. Papandreou's constitutional changes were enacted in 1986, consolidating power in the office of the prime minister, transformed the liberal democracy of Greece based on the constitution of 1975 into a 'populist democracy' with a majoritarian parliamentary system and a prime minister acting as a "parliamentary autocrat."

=== Stabilization effort and disillusionment (1985–1989) ===
Papandreou began his second administration with a comfortable majority in parliament and increased powers. Financial and corruption scandals soon surrounded his premiership while the Greek economy deteriorated. The repeal of anti-terrorism legislation and controversial foreign policy decisions led to a significant rise in terrorist incidents in Greece. Papandreou's extramarital affair and eventual divorce from his wife became a frequent topic of yellow newspapers and tabloids. The retired Karamanlis publicly described the situation at the end of Papandreou's second administration as: "A boundless lunatic asylum," while others refer to the events surrounding 1989 as "dirty '89."

==== Failed stabilization of the economy ====
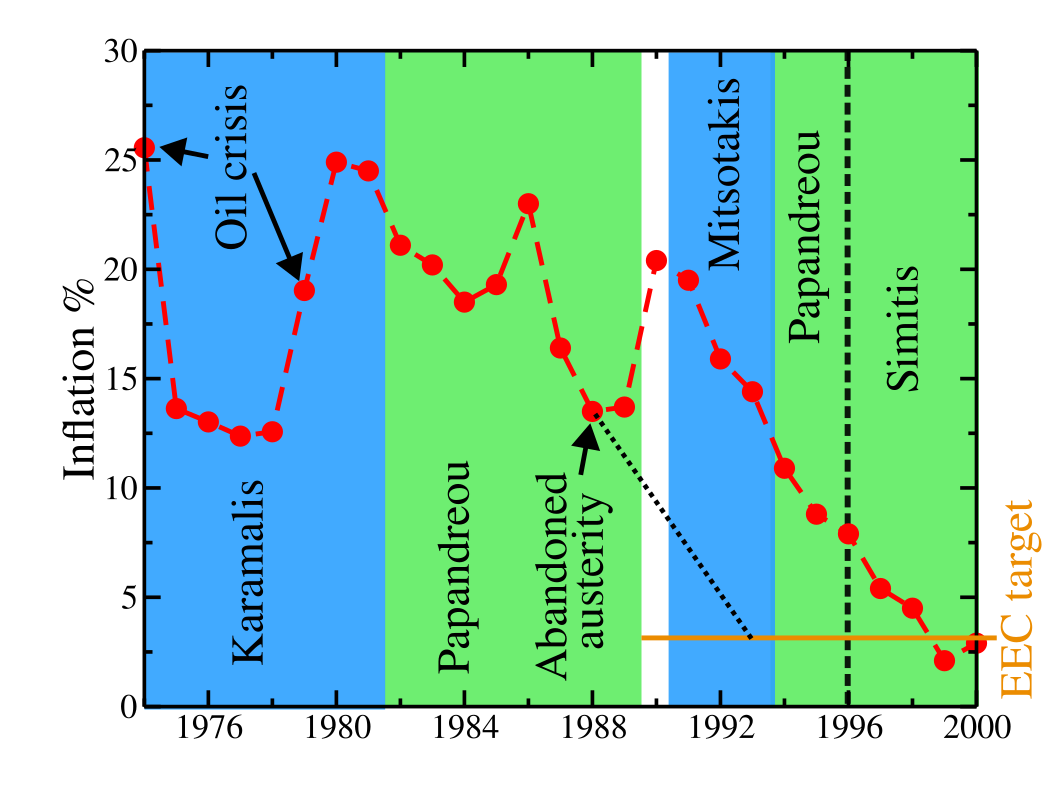
Greek inflation (%) in 1974–2000 period. The colored regions approximately highlight the prime minister's reigns; for 1989–1990, there was no stable government due to Papandreou's change in electoral law. In 1987, Papandreou abandoned the austerity measures (the dotted line estimates inflation if he had not) and delayed the convergence of the Greek economy with EEC criteria by more than four years. The 1980–2000 dataset is from the International Monetary Fund website , the 1974–1979 dataset is from AMECO Database .

In 1985, Papandreou's government applied to the EEC for a $1.75 billion loan to address Greece's widening foreign trade deficit (8.7% of GDP). The EEC required a package of economic stabilization measures as a condition for the loan. These measures were implemented and included a 15% devaluation of the drachma, limits on government borrowing, stricter monetary policy, wage controls, and the elimination of some tax exemptions, which effectively reduced incomes to pre-1980 levels. Public consumption fell by 2.2% on average, and public investment decreased by 18.2% in 1986 and 1987.

Papandreou presented the loan as essential for Greece, arguing that without it, the International Monetary Fund (IMF) would impose even harsher austerity measures. Greece signed the Single European Act in February 1986, which aimed to create a single EEC market by 1992 through deregulation and reduced state intervention. Simitis's policies had the intended outcome, with inflation dropping from 23% in 1986 to 13.5% in 1988, and the Public Sector Borrowing Requirement falling from 18% of GDP in 1985 to 13% in 1987. Papandreou was shaken by the widespread backlash, with long-running strikes and demonstrations by farmers and major unions in early 1987. With the elections approaching, Papandreou forced Simitis to resign from his ministerial position in November 1987, and the austerity measures were abandoned, violating the loan agreement. Greece started to fall behind in terms of economic convergence with EEC goals, competitiveness, and growth, gaining a reputation nationally and in European circles as that of a 'black sheep' or a 'lost cause'.

==== Rapprochement with Turkey ====
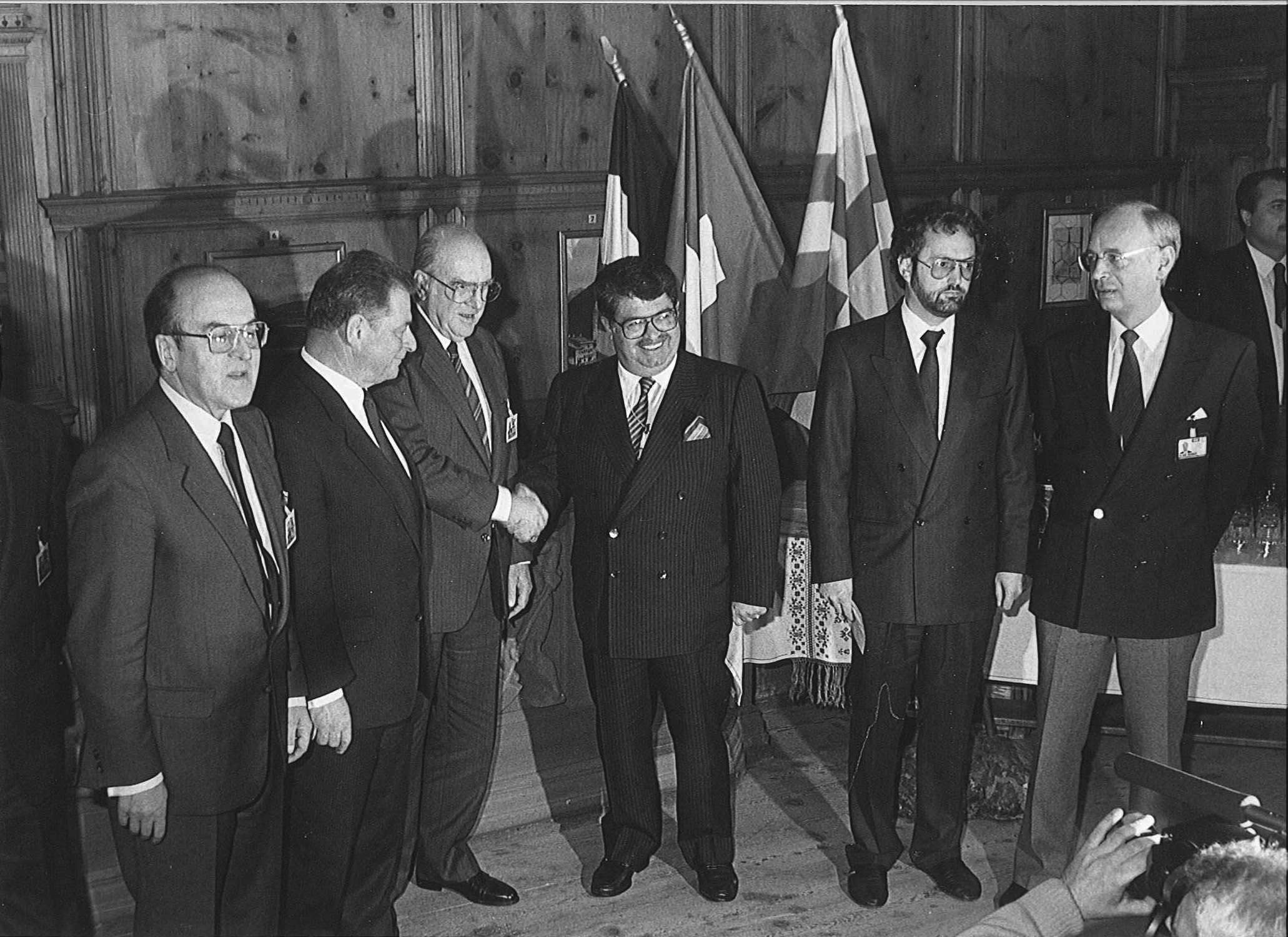
Davos World Economic Forum Annual Meeting 1988 – Handshake between Prime Ministers Andreas Papandreou and Turgut Özal

Greece and Turkey nearly entered into war over a miscommunication in late March 1987 regarding oil exploration in the Aegean Sea near the Greek island Thasos. After the crisis, Papandreou communicated with his Turkish counterpart, Turgut Özal, and discussed over "secret talking points," diffusing the tense atmosphere. In January 1988, Papandreou and Özal met at the World Economic Forum to improve the relations between their two countries. The meeting established a 'no war agreement', a hotline between the two governments, and joint committees to improve political and economic relations. Papandreou sought this agreement to improve his image as a man of peace. Mitsotakis criticized the meeting for focusing on bilateral disputes in Davos and "shelving" the Cyprus dispute. Papandreou later denounced the Davos process and apologized from the podium of the parliament.

==== Heart surgery, Liani, and crowd size ====
In August 1988, Papandreou underwent major heart surgery in London, but he refused to relinquish his power. The operation and recovery lasted three months, leaving the Greek state and party without a leader. It was revealed that his wife did not accompany him. Instead, Dimitra Liani, a 33-year-old Olympic Airways steward he met in 1986, was his companion in the months before the surgery. Papandreou divorced his wife one month before the June 1989 elections and married Liani soon after. Liani became an influential 'gatekeeper' for Papandreou's favor and was involved in appointments in the Prime Minister's Office. The sudden elevation of Liani had negative effects on government operations and caused discontent within PASOK, in which his sons had key positions.

His return from London on 22 October sparked a series of controversies. No family member greeted Papandreou upon his return. Three days later, there was a sudden strike from the Greek Radio and Television Corporation (ERT) employees, alleging that PASOK gave prepared texts to ERT's employees to read as live reports at the scene of Papandreou's arrival. The government spokesman publicly declared the strike illegal and criticized the ERT's union for failing to portray Papandreou's arrival similarly (crowd size and enthusiasm) to Karamanlis's return after the fall of the junta.

==== Koskotas scandal ====
During Papandreou's second term as Greek Prime Minister, widespread corruption scandals involving PASOK were revealed, including the Bank of Crete scandal involving George Koskotas, who embezzled large sums to build a media empire that supported PASOK. Investigations revealed serious government misconduct, including blocked audits, profiteering from illegal arms sales, and inflated military purchases with unofficial commissions to PASOK officials.

In 1989, Time magazine published claims by Koskotas alleging that Papandreou directed over $200 million in state funds to Koskotas's bank and received $600,000 in a Pampers box. Papandreou denied the allegations, blamed U.S. interference, and sued the magazine. Six ministers resigned, and Papandreou barely survived two no-confidence votes. He passed controversial emergency legislation to shield himself from prosecution. On 26 September 1989, tensions escalated when Pavlos Bakoyannis, a key figure in efforts to indict Papandreou, was assassinated by the terrorist group 17 November, just before a parliamentary debate on indictments. On 28 September 1989, Papandreou and four ministers were indicted by the Parliament, and he publicly denounced his accusers.

Koskotas was extradited to Greece in 1991 for trial, and Papandreou's trial began in Athens on 11 March 1991. As a former prime minister, he exercised his constitutional right not to attend the trial and proclaimed it a witch-hunt. In January 1992, the Parliament-appointed tribunal of 13 judges of Supreme Special Court acquitted Papandreou of instigating the loss of funds of state companies with a 7–6 vote, and a bribery charge of receiving the proceeds of a crime with a vote of 10–3.

==== Surveillance state and abuse of power ====
In 1989, it was revealed that the National Information Service (EYR), through the state telecommunications organization OTE, had bugged over 46,000 phones of allies and enemies in politics, press, business, and law; Papandreou used the obtained information for PASOK's purposes. The wiretapping infrastructure was established in previous decades and used by the junta and, to a lesser degree conservative governments to track suspects that may pose a threat at national level on anti-communist grounds. Papandreou utilized these tools and expanded the potential targets by changing the definition of "national security threat" to include any Greek citizen raising criticism against him. The list of potential terrorists, according to Papandreou, included well-respected politicians such as Karamanlis, political opponents Mitsotakis and Evangelos Averoff, senior ministers in PASOK governments who may be potential successors such as Simitis and Gennimatas, newspaper publishers, police chiefs, and PASOK's governmental spokesman. A former head of EYR appointed by PASOK claimed that none of these activities would have been possible without the prime minister's approval, implicating Papandreou.

In 1989, during his catharsis, Junta's files on private citizens were revealed, which were promised by Papandreou to be destroyed before 1981 and proclaimed in 1985. Instead, they were preserved, expanded upon, and updated under his direction to include anyone he viewed as a potential enemy. This list included political opponents inside and outside PASOK and prominent conservatives and communists. Leaks to pro-PASOK yellow newspapers against Papandreou's opponents originated from these files. Many on the Left were uncomfortable with Papandreou's threat of using the files to entice their vote by invoking the danger of these files coming into the possession of conservatives. The majority of these files were destroyed in 1989 by the collaborative government of conservatives and communists to prevent future governments from exploiting the files for political gains, as Papandreou did.

Beyond the financial scandals, the public was worried about the government's assertions of arbitrary power. Papandreou used the national broadcasting organization as a public relations agency. The newspapers that were unfriendly to PASOK were openly threatened by his ministers. Six months before the 1989 elections, public appointments were bestowed on about 90,000 people to gain additional votes.

=== Catharsis (1989–1990) ===
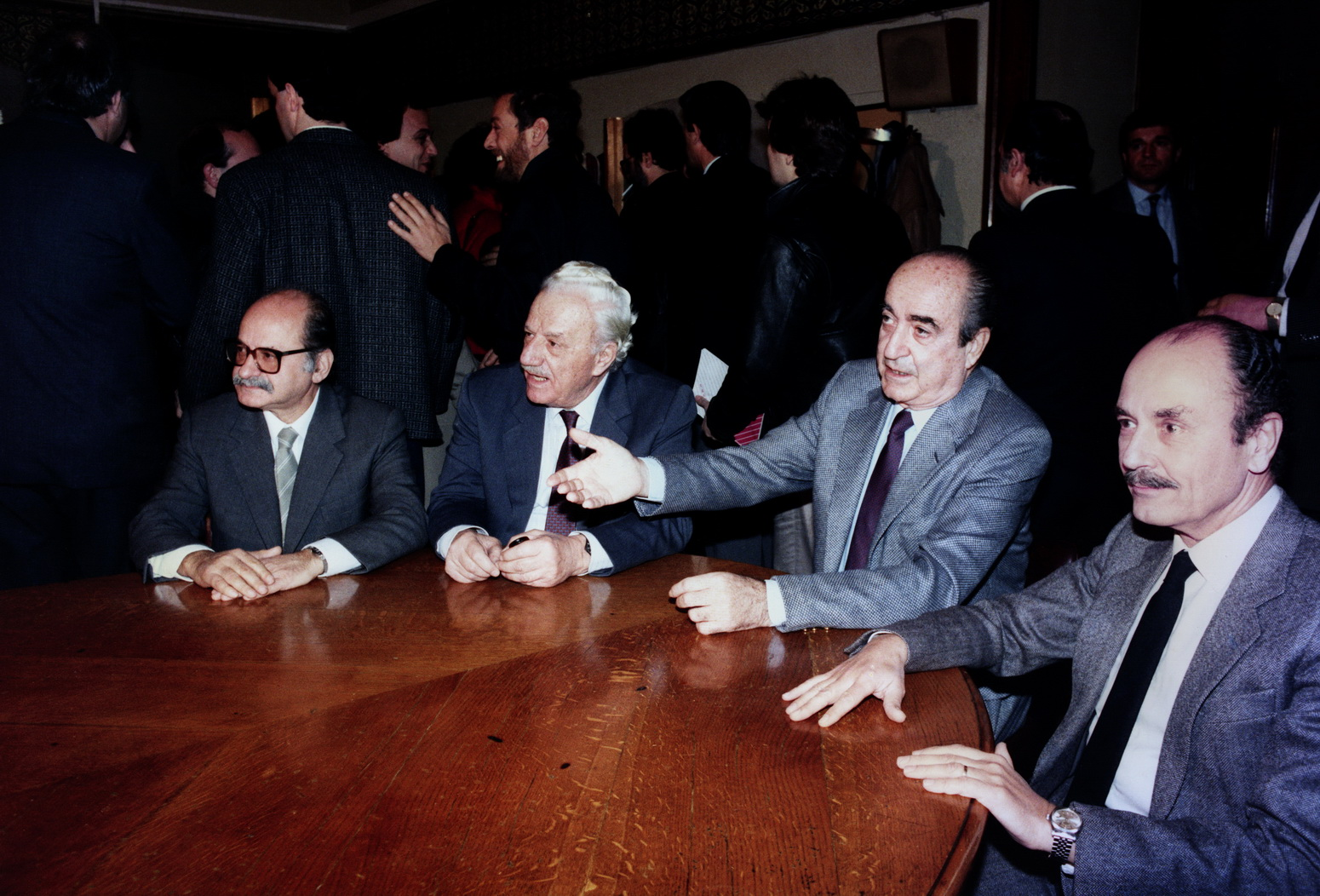
Four Greek politicians (L-R: Leonidas Kyrkos, Charilaos Florakis, Mitsotakis, Konstantinos Stephanopoulos) discuss a time after the Papandreou indictment for the Koskotas scandal. Papandreou called them the "gang of four", alluding to the Chinese political group of the same name.

In the June 1989 elections, PASOK's support dropped to 38%, largely due to the Koskotas scandal. Although Mitsotakis's New Democracy secured 44%, it was insufficient to form a government. Papandreou's last-minute change of the electoral vote law required a party to win 50% of the vote to govern independently. Papandreou hoped that while PASOK might come second in electoral votes, it could form a government with the support of the other leftist parties, but he was rejected. New Democracy formed an unexpected coalition with the united Leftist parties under Synaspismos. Despite their opposing ideologies and rivalry that mainly stemmed from the Civil War, both parties sought political catharsis through a thorough investigation of PASOK's corruption. The decision carried additional responsibility because if charges were not filed against Papandreou during this term, future prosecutions would be impossible. Papandreou ordered his ministers to withhold cooperation during the transition of power, resulting in official documents and state treaties going missing. The transitional government was dissolved after the indictment of Papandreou for the Koskotas scandal.

In the November 1989 elections, New Democracy rose to 46% and could still not form a government. A National unity government was formed by New Democracy, PASOK, and Synaspismos under 85-year-old former banker Xenophon Zolotas to break the deadlock and restore public trust. Zolotas resigned in April 1990, unable to reverse the economic decline attributed to Papandreou's earlier policies. In the April 1990 elections, Mitsotakis secured enough support to form a government, with Papandreou becoming opposition leader.

=== Papandreou in opposition (1990–1993) ===
Recovering from the Koskotas scandals and electoral defeat, Papandreou had a relatively quiet opposition strategy (departing from the radical rhetoric in the 1970s and early 1980s). Mitsotakis moved to reverse Papandreou's economic and foreign policies, implementing a series of difficult and unpopular reforms that Papandreou criticized.

Upon taking office, Mitsotakis introduced austerity measures reminiscent of Simitis's 1985–87 program, which Papandreou failed to endorse wholeheartedly in his second term, including freezing public-sector salaries and pensions, cutting spending, raising taxes, and repealing the wage price index that had maintained high incomes but fueled inflation. To attract investment, his administration liquidated 44 state-controlled companies under the "Industrial Reconstruction Organisation" created by PASOK. While the austerity helped the Greek economy move toward Euro convergence, it also deepened public frustration.

Mitsotakis sought to repair relations with the U.S., which were damaged under Papandreou, by signing a defense cooperation agreement in 1990, supporting U.S. operations during the Gulf War, and visiting Washington as the first Greek prime minister since 1964 by Papandreou's father. Mitsotakis' government ultimately fell in 1993 after Antonis Samaras left New Democracy over disagreements on the handling of the Macedonia naming dispute.

Papandreou campaigned to bring back the euphoria of the early 1980s. Moreover, PASOK's campaign program had dropped the past socialist ideals and instead presented itself as a "responsible" political party. The Greek people voted in October 1993 the return of Papandreou to power. Following the electoral results, Mitsotakis resigned from the leadership of New Democracy.

=== Return to power (1993–1996) ===
Papandreou's return to power was less vigorous, as he could work a few hours a day due to his fragile health; for much of 1995, he remained bedridden. He relied upon Lianni, now officially part of the government as Chief of Staff, alienating many of his senior ministers. Two factions emerged in the party: the reformers faction with a pro-Europe vision, led by Simitis and Vasso Papandreou (no relation), and the loyalists faction advocating a populist path, led by Akis Tsochatzopoulos and Kostas Laliotis. Papandreou favored one of the loyalists without specifying which, but party members tended to favor the reformers, reflecting Papandreou losing grip on his party.

Papandreou had to bring the Greek economy to converge to Euro convergence criteria, but little time remained to achieve them. He abandoned his campaign promises and continued Mitsotakis's austerity policies with minor alterations, expanding the deregulation and liberalization of the economy. There was less public reaction to these policies because Papandreou found a compromising position between capital and unions, and the pace of deregulation was slower than his predecessor.

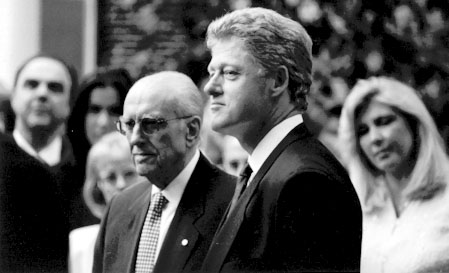
Prime Minister Andreas Papandreou on official visit with United States President William J. Clinton, Washington, April 1994. Dimitra Liani is in the background on the right.

In February 1994, Papandreou ordered an economic embargo on North Macedonia due to the ongoing naming dispute. In April 1994, Papandreou visited the United States to meet with President Clinton, who had recently recognized the new republic, but failed to make any progress towards resolving the naming dispute on favorable terms for Greece. Papandreou hoped the embargo would have been a bargaining chip, but it backfired because North Macedonia gained considerable sympathy worldwide at the expense of Greece's reputation. In September 1995, an interim accord was signed between the two countries to temporarily address the name issue and end the 18-month embargo. In October 1993, Papandreou announced the "Common Defence Dogma" with the Republic of Cyprus, and the intention of expanding the territorial waters to 12 miles in November 1994, which further disturbed Turkey. These actions increased the chances for another crisis, as it happened at Imia in January 1996, right after the transition of power from Papandreou to Simitis.

On 21 November 1995, Papandreou was hospitalized with advanced heart disease and renal failure at Onassio Cardiac Surgery Centre and refused to retire from office. Papandreou's refusal paralyzed the government; Kostas Simitis resigned in protest, and Papandreou's eldest son joined the call for his father's resignation. Papandreou resigned on 16 January 1996, and Simitis was elected as the new party leader on 18 January. Papandreou died on 23 June 1996.

== Governance and political features ==
=== Governance and populism ===
Papandreou had lifelong experience in political campaigning, admired for his political charisma and ability to shape national narratives. However, he had little ministerial experience, and spent little time preparing to govern before the 1981 election victory. He appointed inexperienced, ideologically loyal ministers and purged senior civil servants, replacing them with party loyalists, thereby erasing institutional memory. These choices weakened the state's functionality and had lasting economic and social costs.

Papandreou's authority within PASOK was nearly absolute, with critics labeling him as authoritarian. He expelled dissenters and used state-controlled and pro-PASOK media for character assassinations. Throughout the 1980s, he frequently reshuffled his cabinet (13 times in 1981–1989, with over 100 people changing various ministerial positions), creating instability and inefficiency. As he became less involved in daily governance, ministers were left without clear direction, and the government increasingly relied on Papandreou's personal authority rather than institutional strength. His centralized control began to erode after the Koskotas scandal.

Papandreou's populism played a central role in shaping his governance. He framed Greek politics as a battle between the oppressed Left and the privileged Right, invoking the trauma of the Civil War to rally support. He claimed to speak for the underprivileged, even at the expense of democratic norms, once declaring, "There are no institutions – only the people rule this country." His rhetoric vilified conservatives, contributing to a sharply divided political landscape that his opponents later emulated. Papandreou replaced local patronage with a centralized system controlled by PASOK by abolishing the merit-based evaluations in selecting civil servants. Civil service positions became rewards for political loyalty, weakening public institutions' functionality. His 1989 call to Minister of Finance Dimitris Tsovolas to "give it all [to them]" (Greek: Τσοβόλα δώσ'τα όλα) ahead of elections symbolized this clientelist approach. PASOK reinstated merit-based hiring in 1994, because public organizations were at near collapse after a decade without merit-based evaluations and intensified PASOK's clientelism.

Despite scandals and economic deterioration, his populism retained strong public appeal that was emulated by opponents and admirers. This appeal allowed his son George Papandreou to become prime minister in the October 2009 parliamentary elections. George's premiership was marked by turmoil, as Greece was embroiled in a debt crisis that shook the country's political order and weakened PASOK's credibility, giving rise to the term Pasokification. After negotiating Greece's first bailout programme with the IMF, Papandreou resigned on 10 November 2011.

Alexis Tsipras, who served as Greece's prime minister in 2015–2019, is known for adopting Papandreou's mannerisms and populist legacy. Tsipras projected himself as an anti-establishment leader, speaking directly to popular frustrations with traditional elites and foreign influence. His rhetoric of national pride and social justice, coupled with his informal demeanor, echoed the emotional appeal that defined Papandreou's era. While Tsipras sought to revive that legacy, his tenure was constrained by economic and political conditions originating from Greece's debt crisis and EU oversight.

=== Stance on terrorism ===
After democracy was restored in 1974, Greece faced growing terrorist activity, fueled by economic struggles and radical left-wing sympathies, especially among youth inspired by the Athens Polytechnic uprising. Prime Minister Karamanlis passed an anti-terror legislation in 1978, which was based on the recently enacted Italian and German anti-terrorist bills. While in opposition, Papandreou criticized the law as unconstitutional and later abolished it in 1983 without offering an alternative, arguing it targeted civil liberties more than actual terrorists.

Papandreou's stance, combined with closer ties to radical Arab regimes, allowed terrorists to operate freely in Greece during the 1980s. This led to strained U.S.-Greece relations, especially after the TWA Flight 847 hijacking, which prompted a U.S. travel advisory and a significant decline in tourism. Terrorist acts, including bombings and murders linked to Arab and Palestinian factions, continued. PASOK often dismissed incidents as American conspiracies, or that the terrorists were freedom fighters.

The symbol of 17 November terrorist organization, which operated largely undisturbed under Papandreou's governance and the inability of the authorities to capture it gave rise to speculation that it was being protected by the Greek state.

The primary domestic terrorist organization was the 17 November (17N), targeted prominent businessmen and Western diplomats with military or intelligence roles and operated from 1975 to 2002. Papandreou closed down the police unit investigating 17N, and his anti-West rhetoric likely aligned with their goals since 17N ceased attacks during the first two years of his administration. Once he allowed U.S. bases to remain, 17N turned against him, reaching its peak in late-1980s with the assassination of New Democracy Member of Parliament Pavlos Bakoyannis during the Koskotas scandal.

Throughout the 1980s, Greek police remained underfunded, weakened by Papandreou's anti-authoritarian stance, resulting in few convictions. State surveillance was used to monitor Papandreou's political rivals instead of terrorists. A policy shift came under Mitsotakis in the 1990s, who reinstated Karamanlis' anti-terror legistation and expelled terrorist groups. PASOK repealed it again in 1993.

=== Cultural and political image ===
Papandreou was a charismatic orator and adept at shaping perceptions to achieve his political goals. Despite his aristocratic and academic background, Papandreou could converse with Greeks of any social status. His intentions were hard to interpret, and he used a form of doublespeak, absent in Greek political language at the time, where terms could change meaning depending on the situation. Supporters and critics referred to him by his first name, "Andreas," a break from tradition in Greek politics that allowed him to distance himself from his family name, associated with the political upheavals preceding the 1967 dictatorship and the Turkish invasion of Cyprus.

In the 1970s, Papandreou made headlines by pairing business suits with turtleneck sweaters instead of the usual shirt and tie. His first appearance in Parliament in a black turtleneck was seen by conservatives as disrespectful. The controversy boosted his popularity, symbolizing his image as a "rebel" against the conservative establishment. Once in power, he adopted the more conventional style of politicians.

== Legacy ==
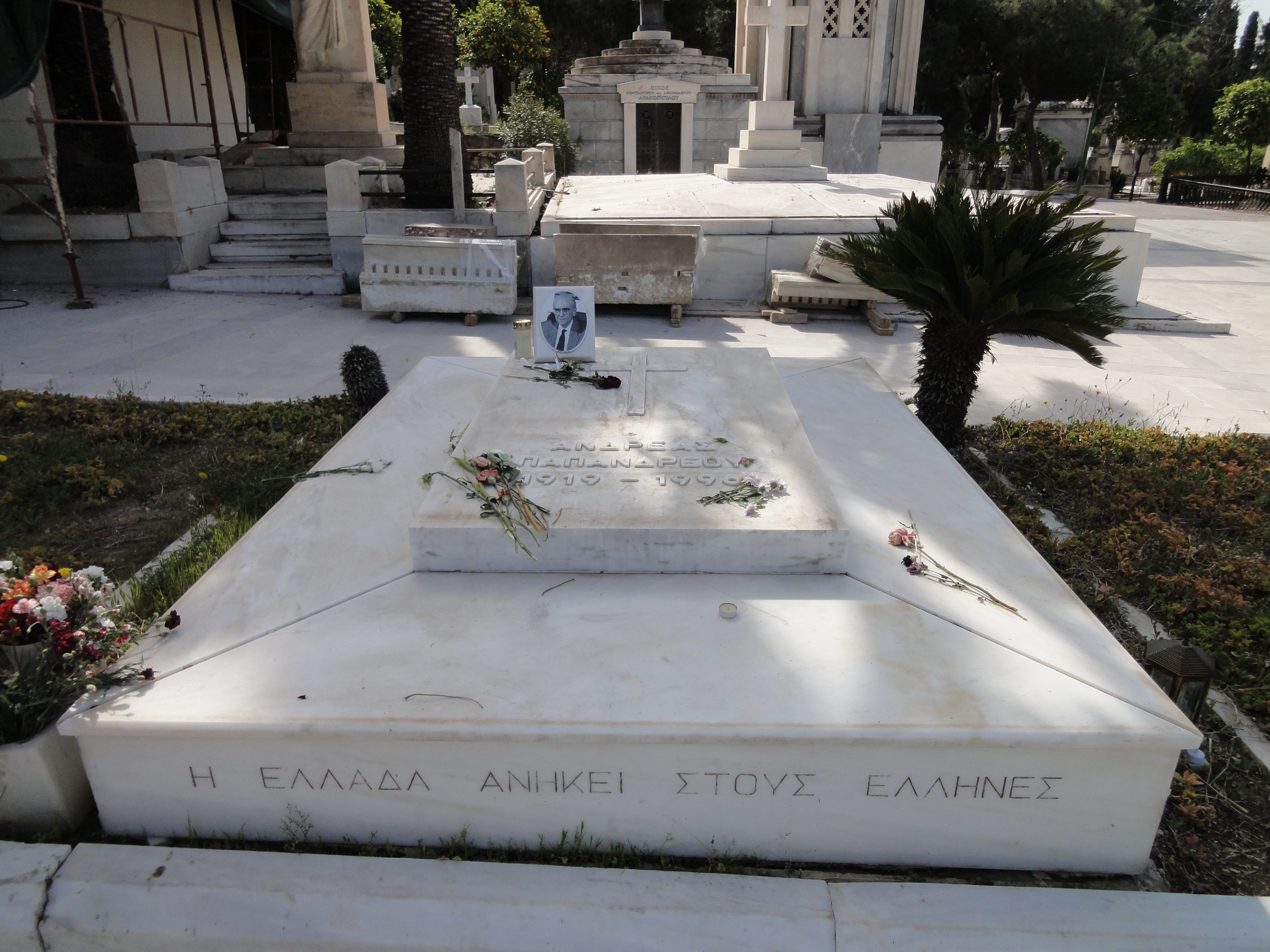
Papandreou's grave in the First Cemetery of Athens. On his grave is written "Greece belongs to the Greeks."

Papandreou was a realist on core political issues but often used a leftist (at times pro-Soviet) rhetoric on peripheral matters. In foreign policy, he continued Karamanlis's policy to remain in the European Union and NATO, both of which he vehemently opposed for years. Complementing this political realism, Papandreou's ability to publicly reject American positions gave Greeks a sense of national independence and psychological self-worth. His frequent radical and combative rhetoric frustrated existing allies and did not recruit new allies (Arab states or countries from the eastern bloc), leaving Greece diplomatically isolated and unable to advance a solution on the Cyprus problem.

In domestic issues, Papandreou shifted political power from the conservatives, who dominated Greek politics for decades, to a more populist and centre-left locus. His social policies expanded access to healthcare and education, strengthened women's rights, and ended the sociopolitical and economic exclusion of social classes. This shift helped Greek society become more pluralistic and converge with Western European countries' social norms. Many of these reforms were introduced during his first administration, which is remembered favorably by the Greek people.

His early achievements were tarnished by controversial decisions leading to a constitutional crisis and over 200 corruption scandals. The revelation Papandreou's extended use of junta's surveillance infrastructure for political gains, his soft stance on terrorism, damaging the legitimacy of democratic institutions, and his public family drama dominated public discourse. Papandreou's populism, under the guise of inclusionist social policies, became part of PASOK's patronage, greatly expanded through the misuse of EEC funds and an unprecedented rate of foreign borrowing, which brought the Greek economy to the verge of bankruptcy twice (in 1985 and 1989). His mishandling of the Greek economy's reconstruction became a central problem for future governments. Papandreou had little impact on improving the Greek state and its institutions, and his governance became a negative reference point.

== Bibliography ==
Books

- Papandreou, Andreas (1943). The Location and Scope of the Entrepreneurial Function. Boston: Harvard University.
- ———————; Wheeler, John T. (1954). Competition and its regulation. Summit St. Kent: Prentice-Hall.
- ———————; Sauerlender, Owen H. (1957). A test of a stochastic theory of choice. University of California publications in economics. Oakland: University of California Press.
- ——————— (1958). Economics as a Science. Philadelphia: Lippincott.
- ——————— (1962). A Strategy for Greek Economic Development. Center of Economic Research.
- ——————— (1962). Fundamentals of model construction in macro-economics. Center of Economic Research.
- ——————— (1966). The Political Element in Economic Development. Stockholm: Almqvist & Wiksell.
- ——————— (1966). Δημοκρατία και εθνική αναγέννηση [Democracy and National Rebirth] (in Greek). Athens: Fexis.
- ——————— (1970). Man's freedom. New York: Columbia University Press.
- ——————— (1971). Democracy at Gunpoint. New York: Deutsch.
- ——————— (1972). Paternalistic Capitalism. Minneapolis: The University of Minnesota Press.
- ——————— (1973). Economic Development - Rhetoric and Reality. Vancouver: The University of British Columbia.
- ———————; Zohar, Uri (1974). Project Selection for National Plans. New York: Praeger Publishers.
- ——————— (1974). The Impact Approach to Project Selection. Toronto: York University.
- ——————— (1975). Ιμπεριαλισμός και οικονομική ανάπτυξη [Imperialism and Economic Development] (in Greek). Athens: Livanis.
- ——————— (1976). Η Ελλάδα στους Έλληνες [Greece to the Greeks] (in Greek). Athens: Karanasis.
- ——————— (1977). Μετάβαση στο σοσιαλισμό [Transition to Socialism] (in Greek). Athens: Αιχμή.

Articles

- Papandreou, Andreas (1950). "Economics and the social sciences". The Economic Journal. 60 (240): 715–723. doi:10.2307/2226710. JSTOR 2226710.
- ——————— (1953). "An experimental test of an axiom in the theory of choice". Econometrica. 21 (3): 477.

== Notes ==
1. Andreas Papandreou wrote in his 1971 book, Democracy at Gunpoint, that his father, on the night of the Colonels' coup, blamed Andreas for the coup, and Andreas himself wondered whether he had crossed the line with his radical campaign.
2. There is a long-standing debate on whether the Johnson administration actively enabled the 1967 coup in Greece. Andreas Papandreou and his academic colleagues frequently accused the U.S. administration of being responsible for the coup, and since then, Andreas Papandreou and other Greek elites sold this to the masses as part of nurturing anti-American sentiment, making it a widespread belief among Greeks. Others are more skeptical due to the lack of smoking gun evidence. Louis Klarevas, based on the declassified documents of the U.S. government and extensive literature review, concluded that there was no official action for the coup, however, additional evidence is required to determine any unofficial activities. The accusations, placing the blame on the U.S. administration for the fall of democracy in Greece, have been characterized as "conspiracy theories".
3. In a poll conducted by Kathimerini in 2007, 48% of those polled called Papandreou the "most important Greek prime minister." In the same poll, the first term of Papandreou's government was voted as the best government Greece ever had after Metapolitefsi.
4. While Andreas Papandreou and Konstantinos Mitsotakis started from the same political party, and both competed for the leadership of the Center Union, Andreas had vilified Mitsotakis for Iouliana of 1965 (siding with the king and in the view of Andreas betraying his father) as a "traitor" effectively stigmatizing the life-long career of Mitsotakis in Greek politics. In 1984, Mitsotakis became the New Democracy party leader because he was the only active politician (Karamanlis was President at the time) who could rival Andreas Papandreou. From 1984 until 1990, the political conflict between Papandreou and Mitsotakis was both personal and polarized. After winning the elections of 1990, Mitsotakis lacked the political capital and sufficient majority to implement his policies despite his long-term ministerial experience, resulting in Mitsotakis's tenure being short.
5. Andreas Papandreou's interview in Le Monde effectively stated his disagreement in public with the Acheson Plan by criticizing the American's efforts in finding a solution to the Cyprus problem while at the same time siding with Makarios, who wanted an independent Cyprus and effectively opposed a union with Greece, known as "Enosis" (Greek: Ένωσις). The Acheson Plan required a territorial concession (e.g., Kastellorizo) as a compromise for a union with Cyprus without a military conflict with Turkey, and in retrospect, it was the best Greece could get in the 1960s. The Americans were losing patience with the Papandreous' delays and maneuvering (beforehand, the first version of the Acheson Plan was leaked to Makarios when visiting Athens). The Le Monde interview was the moment when American officials lost trust in both Papandreous. Andreas Papandreou's influence on his father by circumventing the Greek Cabinet's unanimous agreement on the Acheson Plan effectively wasted this chance for a peaceful union, and a lack of a solution on Cyprus intensified the political instability in Greece that led to the 1967 Greek junta and the Turkish invasion of Cyprus.
6. According to the Greek constitution of 1952, article 31 states that the king hires and fires ministers (Greek: Ο βασιλεύς διορίζει και παύει τους υπουργούς αυτού). This created confusion as the prime minister was chosen by popular election, with the king forced to work with, but at any moment, the king could dissolve the government and parliament and call new elections. Two prime ministers in the 1950s had raised the question as to who governs the state, the king or the prime minister, echoing the disagreements between Eleftherios Venizelos and Konstantine I of Greece during the National Schism.
7. American officials and friends like Carl Kaysen, while willing to aid efforts to secure his release from the junta's imprisonment, had written him off as a demagogue and untrustworthy. Similarly, the British Labour Party and Foreign Office also ignored the exiled Papandreou because he was unreliable and expressed anti-Western views. Karamanlis declined Papandreou's requests for a meeting by commenting that Andreas Papandreou could not be ignored nor be trusted. U.S. Ambassador Phillips Talbot stated that his political colleagues are virtually unanimous in their hostility toward Andreas Papandreou. He concluded that "Andreas would probably have been wiser to return to the university for the indefinite future."
8. Unable to challenge Karamanlis's foreign policy directly, Papandreou channeled Greece's nationalist sentiments and widespread post-junta feelings of humiliation and betrayal into fiery rhetoric targeting NATO and the EEC. Papandreou's campaign slogan, "Greece belongs to the Greeks", sharply contrasted with Karamanlis's assertion that "Greece belongs to the West." According to political scientist Takis Pappas, Papandreou saw radical polarization and political extremism as the only way to secure his path to power, believing that inflaming divisions within Greek politics would rally support for his cause.
9. Beyond the anti-NATO and anti-EEC rhetoric, Papandreou's campaign promises include higher wages for workers, more jobs, improvements in transportation, reform of Greece's antiquated education system, cheaper housing, higher prices for farm goods, and an end to corruption and inefficiency in the state bureaucracy. He also promised to decentralize the government and give more control to local authorities. The smog covering Athens would disappear once PASOK was in power, though the smog got worse in the 1980s.
10. Civil marriage was a novelty in Greek culture, and it was strongly opposed by the Church of Greece, which was the only institution in Greece that legally performed marriages before this. Couples seeking a civil marriage had to get married outside Greece, generally in Italy.
11. Earnings rose higher than inflation in 1988, compensating workers for their loss of purchasing power. At the same time, the consumption rate per capita had progressively increased since 1981 but remained well below the EEC average, and savings per capita reached the lowest rate since 1971. The money supply rose by 23% while the drachma appreciated in real terms. This expansionary policy encouraged growth in the short term, with a rise in domestic demand and a rise in real GDP by 4.3%. In addition, private investment rose by 12% and public investment by 1.6%. Due to revenue shortfalls and high public spending, however, the Public Sector Borrowing Requirement reached 16% of GDP. In addition, total public sector debt went above 100% of GDP by the end of 1988.
12. The total amount of money was substantial, approximately 1/280 of the Greek economy, based on Greece's GDP in 1986 of US$56 billion.
13. In response to Papandreou's declaration that Greece intended to expand to 12 miles, in June 1995, the Turkish Parliament voted for a "casus belli" license, meaning the Turkish government could take any necessary action (including military) if Greece exercised its right (according to Law of the Sea) to expand.
14. Laliotis was often called the Papandreou's "fifth child" due to his youth and privileged access to Papandreou.
15. Papandreou's ministerial experience amounted to just 18 months, serving while his father was prime minister from February 1964 to July 1965. By contrast, Konstantinos Mitsotakis and Kostas Simitis each had roughly seven years of ministerial experience before becoming prime ministers. Karamanlis had three years as Minister of Public Works, though as prime minister he was surrounded by more seasoned ministers.
16. Papandreou's weak health after the heart surgery in London and Koskotas affair, were the first cracks in Papandreou's complete authority over PASOK. While he remained popular, he no longer had the luxury to expel critics from PASOK due to the pressure from the Left- and Right-wings on the growing corruption scandals and the smaller margins between PASOK and New Democracy parties. By 1995, his health started to deteriorate at which point the party support effectively vanished.

== See also ==
- Andreas Papandreou airbase

== Additional reading ==
- Boggs, Carl (1995). The socialist tradition: from crisis to decline. New York: Routledge. ISBN 978-0-415-90670-8.
- Jacobs, Francis (1989). Western European political parties: a comprehensive guide. London: Addison-Wesley Longman Limited. ISBN 978-0-582-00113-8.
- Kassimeris, George (2019). "Greek Everyman: Andreas Papandreou at 100". The Political Quarterly. 90 (2): 304–309. doi:10.1111/1467-923X.12685. hdl:2436/622589.
- Kutlay, Mustafa (2018). The Political Economies of Turkey and Greece: Crisis and Change. London: Springer International Publishing. ISBN 978-3-319-92788-6.
- Pantazopoulos, Andreas (2001). For the people and the nation - the moment of Andreas Papandreou [Για το λαό και για το έθνος - η στιγμή του Ανδρέα Παπανδρέου 1965–1989] (in Greek). Athens: Ekdoseis Polis. ISBN 978-960-8132-32-0.
- Veremis, Thanos (2017). Ανδρέας Παπανδρέου: Μεγάλες Προσδοκίες [Andreas Papandreou: Great expectations]. Athens: Pataki. ISBN 978-960-16-7206-9.
- Williams, Allan M.; Gallagher, Tom, eds. (1989). Southern European Socialism Parties, Elections, and the Challenge of Government. Manchester: Manchester University Press. ISBN 978-0-7190-2500-6.

Party political offices
New office	President of the Panhellenic Socialist Movement; 1974–1996	Succeeded by Kostas Simitis
Political offices
Preceded by Georgios Mavros	Leader of the Opposition; 1977–1981	Succeeded by Georgios Rallis
Preceded by Georgios Rallis	Prime Minister of Greece; 1981–1989	Succeeded by Tzannis Tzannetakis
Preceded by Evangelos Averoff	Minister for National Defence; 1981–1986	Succeeded by Ioannis Charalambopoulos
Preceded by Konstantinos Mitsotakis	Leader of the Opposition; 1989	Succeeded by National Union government
Preceded by National Union government	Leader of the Opposition; 1990–1993	Succeeded by Miltiadis Evert
Preceded by Konstantinos Mitsotakis	Prime Minister of Greece; 1993–1996	Succeeded by Kostas Simitis
