= Nikos Papandreou =

Greek writer and politician (b.1956)

Nikos Papandreou MEP
- Νίκος Παπανδρέου
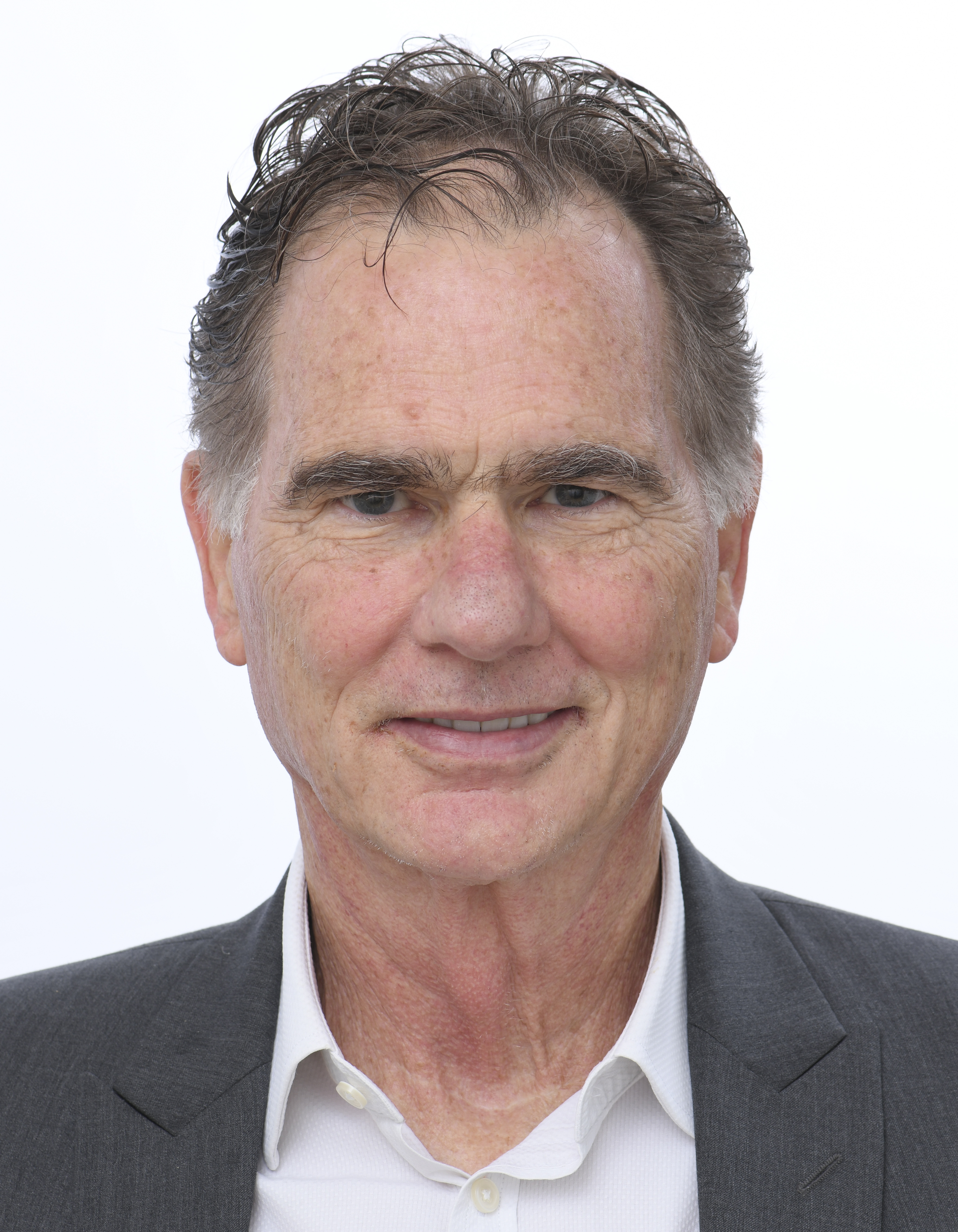
- Official portrait, 2024

Member of the European Parliament for Greece
- Incumbent
- Assumed office 3 May 2023
- Preceded by: Nikos Androulakis

Personal details
- Born: 29 September 1956 (age 70) Alameda, California, United States
- Citizenship: Greece • United States
- Party: PASOK – Movement for Change
- Spouse: Alexia Klironomou
- Children: 2
- Parent(s): Andreas Papandreou (father); Margaret Chant-Papandreou (mother)
- Relatives: George Papandreou (brother); Georgios Papandreou (grandfather)
- Education: Yale University; Princeton School of Public and International Affairs
- Occupation: Writer • Politician

Nikos Papandreou (Greek: Νίκος Παπανδρέου; born 29 September 1956) is a Greek politician, businessman, cultural commentator and writer. He has been serving as a Member of the European Parliament for PASOK since May 2023, as he replaced MEP Nikos Androulakis who resigned in order to run in the 2023 Greek legislative election.

== Family ==
Papandreou is a son of former Prime Minister of Greece Andreas Papandreou and his second wife Margaret Chant-Papandreou and younger brother of George Papandreou.

== Parliamentary work ==
As a member of the Subcommittee on Public Health (SANT), he has been a prominent advocate for the implementation of the Europe's Beating Cancer Plan, specifically championing EU-wide protocols for lung cancer screening and the integration of liquid biopsy technology into national health systems.

Within the Committee on Economic and Monetary Affairs (ECON), Papandreou served as a shadow rapporteur on the legislative framework for the Digital euro.

== See also ==
- List of members of the European Parliament for Greece, 2019–2024
