= Dimitra Liani =

Third wife of Andreas Papandreou (born 1955)

- Δήμητρα Λιάνη
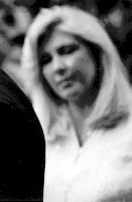
- Liani in 1994

Spouse of the Prime Minister of Greece
- In role 13 October 1993 – 22 January 1996
- Prime Minister: Andreas Papandreou
- Preceded by: Marika Mitsotakis
- Succeeded by: Daphne Arkadiou

Personal details
- Born: 30 April 1955 (age 71) Florina, Greece
- Party: PASOK
- Spouses: Alexis Kapopoulos (m. 1983; div. 1987) Andreas Papandreou (m. 1989; died 1996)

Dimitra Liani (Greek: Δήμητρα Λιάνη; born 30 April 1955) is a Greek former cabin attendant known for being the third wife and widow of Prime Minister of Greece Andreas Papandreou.

== Early life and career ==
Born Dimitra Liani in 1955 in Elefsina, she comes from a well-connected family. Her family hails from Kleisoura, Kastoria and later moved to Amyntaio. Her father was a distinguished army officer, Colonel Constantine Lianis, while her uncle George Lianis was Minister, and her cousin Giorgos Lianis (born 1942) was member of parliament for her hometown. She worked as a cabin attendant with Olympic Airways.

== Personal life ==
She married Papandreou in 1989, becoming his official consort and head of his private office when he returned to power in 1993.

Papandreou died in 1996 aged 77, and his will left his entire fortune to her.
