= Carl Boggs =

American social scientist

Carl Boggs (born July 22, 1937) is an American academic who is social science and film studies professor at the National University in Los Angeles.

== Career ==
He received his Ph.D. in political science from the University of California, Berkeley in 1970. He has also taught at the University of South Carolina and Washington University in St. Louis.

He has written numerous books on subjects including social theory, European and American politics, and military policy. He has contributed to several socialist organizations and journals, such as Solidarity, the LA Socialist Community School, and the Free Speech Movement.

He received a Charles A. McCoy Career Achievement Award.

== Publications ==
=== Books ===
- Boggs, Carl. Fugitive Politics: The Struggle for Ecological Sanity. 'New York, NY : Routledge, 2022. ISBN 978-1-000-46147-3
- Boggs, Carl. Impasse Of European Communism. Routledge, 2021. ISBN 978-0-367-30846-9
- Boggs, Carl. Fascism Old and New American Politics at the Crossroads. Boca Raton, FL: Routledge, an imprint of Taylor and Francis, 2018. ISBN 978-1-351-04970-2
- Boggs, Carl. The Hollywood War Machine: U.S. Militarism and Popular Culture. Routledge, 2017. ISBN 978-1-315-08627-9
- Boggs, Carl. Origins of the Warfare State: World War II and the Transformation of American Politics.Routledge 2017. ISBN 978-1-138-20435-5
- Boggs, Carl. Drugs, Power, and Politics: Narco Wars, Big Pharma, and the Subversion of Democracy. 2016. ISBN 978-1-61205-871-9
- Boggs, Carl. Empire Versus Democracy: The Triumph of Corporate and Military Power. Routledge 2016. ISBN 978-1-136-16436-1
- Boggs, Carl. Ecology and Revolution: Global Crisis and the Political Challenge. Basingstoke: Palgrave Macmillan, 2012.ISBN 978-1-137-28226-2
- Boggs, Carl. Phantom Democracy: Corporate Interests and Political Power in America. New York: Palgrave Macmillan, 2011. ISBN 978-0-230-11574-3
- Boggs, Carl. The Crimes of Empire: Rogue Superpower and World Domination. London: Pluto, 2010. ISBN 978-0-7453-2946-8 According to WorldCat, the book is held in 1208 libraries
- Boggs, Carl. Imperial Delusions: American Militarism and Endless War. Lanham, Md: Rowman & Littlefield, 2005. ISBN 978-0-7425-2772-0
- Boggs, Carl, and Thomas Pollard. A World in Chaos: Social Crisis and the Rise of Postmodern Cinema. Lanham, Md: Rowman & Littlefield Publishers, 2003. ISBN 978-0-7425-3289-2
- Boggs, Carl. The End of Politics: Corporate Power and the Decline of the Public Sphere. New York: Guilford Press, 2001. ISBN 978-1-57230-504-5
- Boggs, Carl. The Socialist Tradition : from Crisis to Decline. New York: Routledge, 1995. ISBN 978-0-415-90669-2
- Boggs, Carl. Intellectuals and the Crisis of Modernity. Albany: State University of New York Press, 1993.ISBN 978-0-7914-1544-3
- Boggs, Carl. Social Movements and Political Power: Emerging Forms of Radicalism in the West. Philadelphia, Pa: Temple University Press, 1986. ISBN 978-0-87722-447-1
- Boggs, Carl. The Two Revolutions: Antonio Gramsci and the Dilemmas of Western Marxism. Boston, MA: South End Press, 1984.ISBN 978-0-89608-225-0
- Boggs, Carl, and David Plotke. The Politics of Eurocommunism: Eclipse of the Bolshevik Legacy in the West. Montreal: Black Rose Books, 1980. ISBN 978-0-919618-32-9

=== Journal articles ===
- Boggs, Carl. "Marxism, prefigurative communism, and the problem of workers’ control." Radical America 11.6 (1977): 99-122.
- Boggs C. Social Capital and Political Fantasy: Robert Putnam's" Bowling Alone". Theory and Society. 2001 Apr 1.30(2):281-97.
- Boggs C. The great retreat: Decline of the public sphere in late twentieth-century America. Theory and Society. 1997 Dec 1.26(6):741-80.
- Boggs C, Pollard T. Hollywood and the Spectacle of Terrorism. New Political Science. 2006 Sep 1.28(3):335-51.
- Boggs C. Revolutionary process, political strategy, and the dilemma of power. Theory and Society. 1977 Sep 1.4(3):359-93.
