= List of members of the Hellenic Parliament, 2007–2009 =

This is a list of the 300 members who were elected to the Hellenic Parliament in the 2007 Greek legislative election.

Of the 300 elected, 34 New Democracy MPs were new to the house, 26 PASOK MPs, 15 KKE MPs, 10 SYRIZA MPs, and 10 LAOS MPs.

Party		September 2007
•	New Democracy	152
	Panhellenic Socialist Movement	102
	Communist Party of Greece	22
	Coalition of the Radical Left	14
	Popular Orthodox Rally	10
Total		300

== Members of Parliament ==
Changes table below records all changes in party affiliation.

Full Name	Constituency	Parliamentary Group
Panagiotis Adraktas	Elis	New Democracy
Konstantinos Agorastos	Larissa	New Democracy
Christos Aidonis	Drama	PASOK
Konstantinos Aivaliotis	Athens B	LAOS
Alekos Alavanos	Heraklion	Syriza
Nasos Alevras	Athens A	PASOK
Georgios Alogoskoufis	Athens A	New Democracy
Kostas Alyssandrakis	Ioannina	KKE
Giannis Amiridis	Pieria	PASOK
Evangelia Ammanatidou-Paschalidou (Litsa)	Thessaloniki B	Syriza
Giorgos Anagnostopoulos	Karditsa	New Democracy
Dimitrios Androulakis (Mimis)	Athens B	PASOK
Tonia Antoniou	Phthiotis	PASOK
Milena Apostolaki	Athens B	PASOK
Grigoris Apostolakos	Lakonia	New Democracy
Vaitsis Apostolatos	Piraeus A	LAOS
Chrysa Arapoglou	Thessaloniki A	PASOK
Dimitra Arapoglou	Piraeus B	LAOS
Evangelos Argyris	Ioannina	PASOK
Alexandros Athanasiadis	Kozani	PASOK
Lefteris Avgenakis	Heraklion	New Democracy
Dimitris Avramopoulos	Athens A	New Democracy
Konstantinos Badouvas	Heraklion	New Democracy
Dora Bakoyianni	Athens A	New Democracy
Ioannis Banias	State list	Syriza
Evangelos Basiakos	Boeotia	New Democracy
Panagiotis Beglitis	Corinthia	PASOK
Michalis Bekiris	Achaea	New Democracy
Anna Benaki-Psarouda	Athens A	New Democracy
Antonis Bezas	Thesprotia	New Democracy
Markos Bolaris	Serres	PASOK
Ioannis Bougas	Phocis	New Democracy
Athanasios Bouras	Attica	New Democracy
Paraskevi Bouzali	Kastoria	New Democracy
Christos Chaidos	Trikala	PASOK
Michalis Chalkidis	Imathia	New Democracy
Spyros Chalvatzis	Athens B	KKE
Maximos Charakopoulos	Larissa	New Democracy
Charalambos Charalambous (Babis)	Corfu	KKE
Panagiotis Chinofotis	State list	New Democracy
Tilemachos Chytiris	Athens B	PASOK
Dimitrios Christofilogiannis	Kavala	New Democracy
Paraskevi Christofilopoulou (Evi)	Attica	PASOK
Michalis Chrysohoidis	Athens B	PASOK
Stavros Dailakis	Drama	New Democracy
Maria Damanaki	Athens B	PASOK
Nikolaos Dendias	Corfu	New Democracy
Alexandros Dermedzopoulos	Evros	New Democracy
Giannis Diamantidis	Piraeus B	PASOK
Anna Diamantopoulou	Athens A	PASOK
Ioannis Dimaras (Giannis)	Athens B	PASOK
Argyris Dinopoulos	Athens B	New Democracy
Giorgos Dolios	Evros	PASOK
Petros Doukas	Attica	New Democracy
Giannis Dragasakis	Athens B	Syriza
Thalia Dragona	State list	PASOK
Thodoris Dritsas	Piraeus A	Syriza
Giannis Drivelegas	Chalkidiki	PASOK
Petros Efthimiou	Athens B	PASOK
Miltiadis Evert	State list	New Democracy
Vassilios Exarchos	Larissa	PASOK
Anna Filini	Athens A	Syriza
Giorgos Floridis	Kilkis	PASOK
Athinaios Florinis	Chalkidiki	New Democracy
Christos Folias	Grevena	New Democracy
Ilias Fotiadis	Imathia	New Democracy
Parthena Foundoukidou	Pella	New Democracy
Nikos Gatzis	Magnesia	KKE
Spyridon-Adonis Georgiadis (Adonis)	Athens B	LAOS
Vassilios Geranidis	Thessaloniki B	PASOK
Angela Gerekou	Corfu	PASOK
Kyriakos Gerontopoulos	Evros	New Democracy
Gerasimos Giakoumatos	Athens B	New Democracy
Sofia Giannaka	Aetolia-Acarnania	PASOK
Michael Giannakis	Boeotia	New Democracy
Giannis Giannelis-Theodosiadis	Lesbos	New Democracy
Athanasios Giannopoulos	Phthiotis	New Democracy
Konstantinos Gioulekas	Thessaloniki A	New Democracy
Kostas Gitonas	Athens B	PASOK
Leonidas Grigorakos	Lakonia	PASOK
Kostis Hatzidakis	Athens B	New Democracy
Sotirios Hatzigakis	Trikala	New Democracy
Achmet Hatziosman	Rodopi	PASOK
Vassilios Ikonomou	Attica	PASOK
Giannis Ioannidis	Thessaloniki A	New Democracy
Euthalia Kafandari (Lila)	Athens A	KKE
Eva Kaili	Thessaloniki A	PASOK
Apostolos Kaklamanis	Athens B	PASOK
Stavros Kalafatis	Thessaloniki A	New Democracy
Sofia Kalandzakou	Messinia	New Democracy
Georgios Kalandzis	Kavala	New Democracy
Sophia Kalantidou	Thessaloniki A	KKE
Elias Kallioras	Phthiotis	New Democracy
Stavros Kalogiannis	Ioannina	New Democracy
Panos Kammenos	Athens B	New Democracy
Achilleas Kandartzis	Trikala	KKE
Liana Kanelli	Athens A	KKE
Krinio Kanellopoulou	Elis	New Democracy
Nikolaos Kanteres	Attica	New Democracy
Achilleas Karamanlis	Serres	New Democracy
Kostas Karamanlis	Thessaloniki A	New Democracy
Anastasios Karamarios	Dodecanese	New Democracy
Ioannis Karambelas	Boeotia	New Democracy
Ilias Karanikas	Evrytania	PASOK
Theodoros Karaoglou	Thessaloniki B	New Democracy
Georgios Karasmanis	Pella	New Democracy
Nikos Karathanasopoulos	Achaea	KKE
Georgios Karatzaferis	Thessaloniki A	LAOS
Michalis Karchimakis	Lasithi	PASOK
Anastasios Karipidis	Serres	New Democracy
Antonios Karpouzas	Pieria	New Democracy
Kostas Kartalis	Magnesia	PASOK
Georgios Kassapidis	Kozani	New Democracy
Theodoros Kassimis	Athens B	New Democracy
Haris Kastanidis	Thessaloniki A	PASOK
Michalis Katrinis	Elis	PASOK
Louka Katseli	State list	PASOK
Apostolos Katsifaras	Achaea	PASOK
Kostas Kazakos	State list	KKE
Simos Kedikoglou	Euboea	New Democracy
Olga Kefalogianni	Rethymno	New Democracy
Manolis Kefalogiannis	Heraklion	New Democracy
Vassilis Kegeroglou	Heraklion	PASOK
Stavros Keletsis	Evros	New Democracy
Konstantinos Kiltidis	Kilkis	New Democracy
Kostas Kollias	Corinthia	New Democracy
Maria Kollia-Tsaroucha	Serres	New Democracy
Georgios Kondogiannis	Elis	New Democracy
Alexandros Kondos	Xanthi	New Democracy
Efstathios Konstantinidis (Stathis)	Florina	New Democracy
Georgios Konstantopoulos	Pieria	New Democracy
Athina Korka-Konsta	Corinthia	New Democracy
Periklis Korovesis	Athens A	Syriza
Ioannis Kosmidis	Chios	New Democracy
Konstantinos Koukodimos	Pieria	New Democracy
Dimos Koumbouris	Attica	KKE
Tassos Kourakis	Thessaloniki A	Syriza
Dimitris Kouselas	Messinia	PASOK
Efstathios Koutmeridis	Serres	PASOK
Giannis Koutsoukos	Elis	PASOK
Fotis Kouvelis	Athens B	Syriza
Spyros Kouvelis	State list	PASOK
Panagiotis Lafazanis	Piraeus B	Syriza
Ilias Lambiris	Rethymno	PASOK
Yannis Lambropoulos	Messinia	New Democracy
Nikos Leggas	Trikala	New Democracy
Theofilos Leondaridis	Serres	New Democracy
Thanassis Levendis	Attica	Syriza
Giorgos Lianis	Florina	PASOK
Michalis Liapis	Athens B	New Democracy
Anastasios Liaskos	Euboea	New Democracy
Dimitris Lindzeris	Piraeus B	PASOK
Spyridon Livanos	Aetolia-Acarnania	New Democracy
Andreas Loverdos	Athens B	PASOK
Andreas Lykouretzos	Arcadia	New Democracy
Vassilios Magginas	Aetolia-Acarnania	New Democracy
Giannis Magriotis	Thessaloniki A	PASOK
Giannis Maniatis	Argolis	PASOK
Ioannis Manolis	Argolis	New Democracy
Aria Manousou-Binipoulou	Cyclades	New Democracy
Tsetin Mantatzi	Xanthi	PASOK
Giorgos Marinos	Euboea	KKE
Christos Markogiannakis	Chania	New Democracy
Konstantinos Markopoulos	Euboea	New Democracy
Giorgos Mavrikos	Athens B	KKE
Vangelis Meimarakis	Athens B	New Democracy
Eva Mela	Athens B	KKE
Panagiotis Melas	Piraeus A	New Democracy
Athanasia Merenditi	Trikala	PASOK
Vassilis Michaloliakos	Piraeus A	New Democracy
Kyriakos Mitsotakis	Athens B	New Democracy
Nikos Moraitis	Aetolia-Acarnania	KKE
Thanos Moraitis	Aetolia-Acarnania	PASOK
Athanasios Nakos	Magnesia	New Democracy
Ektor Nasiokas	Larissa	PASOK
Anastasios Nerantzis	Piraeus B	New Democracy
Stelios Nikiforakis	Chania	New Democracy
Giorgos Nikitiadis	Dodecanese	PASOK
Vera Nikolaidou	Piraeus B	KKE
Grigoris Niotis	Piraeus B	PASOK
Georgios Orfanos	Thessaloniki A	New Democracy
Fani Palli-Petralia	Athens B	New Democracy
Nikolaos Panagiotopoulos	Kavala	New Democracy
Panos Panagiotopoulos	Athens B	New Democracy
Elpida Pandelaki	Piraeus A	KKE
Michalis Pandoulas	Ioannina	PASOK
Theodoros Pangalos	Attica	PASOK
Vangelis Papachristos	Preveza	PASOK
Nikos Papadimatos	Achaea	New Democracy
Elsa Papadimitriou	Argolis	New Democracy
Georgios Papadimitriou	State list	PASOK
Alekos Papadopoulos	Athens B	PASOK
Michail Papadopoulos	Kozani	New Democracy
Giorgos Papageorgiou	Arta	New Democracy
Giorgos Papageorgiou	Euboea	PASOK
Michalis Papagiannakis	Athens B	Syriza
Giorgos Papakonstantinou	Kozani	PASOK
Catherine Papakosta-Sidiropoulou	Athens B	New Democracy
Anastasios Papaligouras	Corinthia	New Democracy
George Papandreou	Achaea	PASOK
Vasso Papandreou	Athens B	PASOK
Aleka Papariga	Athens B	KKE
Kostas Papasiozos	Arta	New Democracy
Yannis Papathanasiou	Athens B	New Democracy
Christos Papoutsis	Athens A	PASOK
Alekos Parisis	Kefallonia	New Democracy
Fevronia Patrianakou	State list	New Democracy
Aristotelis Pavlidis	Dodecanese	New Democracy
Prokopis Pavlopoulos	Athens A	New Democracy
Katerina Perlepe-Sifounaki	Euboea	PASOK
Giorgos Petalotis	Rodopi	PASOK
Filippos Petsalnikos	Kastoria	PASOK
Fotini Pipili	Athens A	New Democracy
Ioannis Plakiotakis	Lasithi	New Democracy
Thanos Plevris	Athens A	LAOS
Ilias Polatidis	Serres	LAOS
Vyron Polydoras	Athens B	New Democracy
Giannis Protoulis	Athens B	KKE
Grigoris Psarianos	Athens B	Syriza
Natasa Ragiou-Mendzelopoulou	Achaia	New Democracy
Giannis Ragousis	State list	PASOK
Elena Rapti	Thessaloniki A	New Democracy
Sylvana Rapti	Athens A	PASOK
Adam Regouzas	Thessaloniki B	New Democracy
Dimitris Reppas	Arcadia	PASOK
Panagiotis Rigas	Cyclades	PASOK
Asterios Rodoulis	Larissa	LAOS
Theodoros Roussopoulos	State list	New Democracy
Konstantinos Rovlias	Karditsa	PASOK
Dimitris Sabaziotis	Messinia	New Democracy
Philippos Sachinidis	Larissa	PASOK
Sofia Sakorafa	Athens B	PASOK
Georgios Salagoudis	Thessaloniki B	New Democracy
Marios Salmas	Aetolia-Acarnania	New Democracy
Antonis Samaras	Messinia	New Democracy
Panagiotis Sgouridis	Xanthi	PASOK
Anastasios Sidiropoulos	Imathia	PASOK
Nikolaos Sifounakis	Lesbos	PASOK
Costas Simitis	Piraeus A	PASOK
Dimitris Sioufas	Karditsa	New Democracy
Panayiotis Skandalakis	Lakonia	New Democracy
Kostas Skandalidis	Athens A	PASOK
Stavros Skopelitis	Lesbos	KKE
Manolis Skoulakis	Chania	PASOK
Giannis Skoulas	Heraklion	PASOK
Maria Skrafnaki	Heraklion	PASOK
Theodoros Soldatos	Lefkada	New Democracy
Georgios Souflias	State list	New Democracy
Georgios Sourlas	Magnesia	New Democracy
Konstantinos Spiliopoulos	Achaea	PASOK
Aris Spiliotopoulos	Athens B	New Democracy
Christos Staikouras	Phthiotis	New Democracy
Dimitrios G. Stamatis	Aetolia-Acarnania	New Democracy
Aris Stathakis	Athens B	New Democracy
Nikolaos Stavrogiannis	Phthiotis	New Democracy
Apostolos Stavrou	Attica	New Democracy
Manolis Stratakis	Heraklion	PASOK
Evripidis Stylianidis	Rodopi	New Democracy
Spyridon Taliadouros	Karditsa	New Democracy
Konstantinos Tasoulas	Ioannina	New Democracy
Petros Tatoulis	Arcadia	New Democracy
Thalassinos Thalassinos	Samos	New Democracy
Michalis Timosidis	Kavala	PASOK
Vassilios Togias	Boeotia	PASOK
Ioannis Tragakis	Piraeus B	New Democracy
Georgios Tryfonidis	Preveza	New Democracy
Lazaros Tsavdaridis	Imathia	New Democracy
Konstantinos Tsiaras	Karditsa	New Democracy
Nikolaos Tsiartsonis	Kozani	New Democracy
Dimitris Tsiogas	Larissa	KKE
Theocharis Tsiokas (Charis)	Thessaloniki B	PASOK
Dimitrios Tsironis	Arta	PASOK
Savvas Tsitouridis	Kilkis	New Democracy
Nikos Tsoukalis	Achaea	Syriza
Elpida Tsouri	Chios	PASOK
Theodora Tzakri	Pella	PASOK
Iordanis Tzamtzis	Pella	New Democracy
Kostas Tzavaras	Elis	New Democracy
Margaritis Tzimas	Drama	New Democracy
Apostolos Tzitzikostas	Thessaloniki A	New Democracy
Georgios Vagionas	Chalkidiki	New Democracy
Giannis Valinakis	Dodecanese	New Democracy
Dimitrios Varvarigos	Zakynthos	PASOK
Miltiadis Varvitsiotis	Athens B	New Democracy
Kyriakos Velopoulos	Thessaloniki B	LAOS
Evangelos Venizelos	Thessaloniki A	PASOK
Miltos Veras	Achaea	PASOK
Christos Verelis	Aetolia-Acarnania	PASOK
Georgios Vlachos	Attica	New Democracy
Manousos-Konstantinos Voloudakis	Chania	New Democracy
Makis Voridis	Attica	LAOS
Georgios Voulgarakis	Athens A	New Democracy
Dinos Vrettos	Attica	PASOK
Ioannis Vroutsis	Cyclades	New Democracy
Marilisa Xenogiannakopoulou	Athens B	PASOK
Lefteris Zagoritis	Athens B	New Democracy
Ioannis Ziogas	Thessaloniki A	KKE
Rodoula Zisi	Magnesia	PASOK
Nikos Zoidis	Dodecanese	PASOK
Christos Zois	Larissa	New Democracy

== Changes ==
- January 31, 2008: Kostas Koukodimos (ND) declares independent.
- May 7, 2008: Diamanto Manolakou, Antonis Skyllakos and Giannis Giokas instead of Elpida Pantelaki, Takis Tsiogas and Dimos Koumbouris (KKE).
- July 23, 2008: Kostas Koukodimos returns to New Democracy's parliamentary team.
- September 30, 2008 Stavros Dailakis is expelled from ND's parliamentary team.
- October 8, 2008 Stavros Dailakis returns to ND's parliamentary team.
- November 11, 2008 Petros Tatoulis (ND) declares independent.
- May 8, 2009: Andreas Makripidis replaced Christos Verelis who resigned over scandal allegations. (PASOK)
- May 22, 2009: Giorgos Papakonstantinou and Sylvana Rapti resigned as they were elected as MEPs. They were replaced by Giannis Vlantis and Thanassis Tsouras accordingly (PASOK).
- June 6, 2009: Georgios Georgiou replaced Thanos Plevris who was elected in the European Parliament (LAOS).
- June 16, 2009: Sophia Andriopoulou replaced Mihalis Papagiannakis who died on May 26. (SYRIZA)
- August 31, 2009: Ioannis Manolis resigned over dissatisfaction with his own party. He is replaced by Dimitris Kranias (ND).

== See also ==
- 2007 Greek legislative election
- List of parliamentary constituencies of Greece
