= Second cabinet of Kostas Karamanlis =

Second Cabinet of Kostas Karamanlis
- Cabinet of Greece

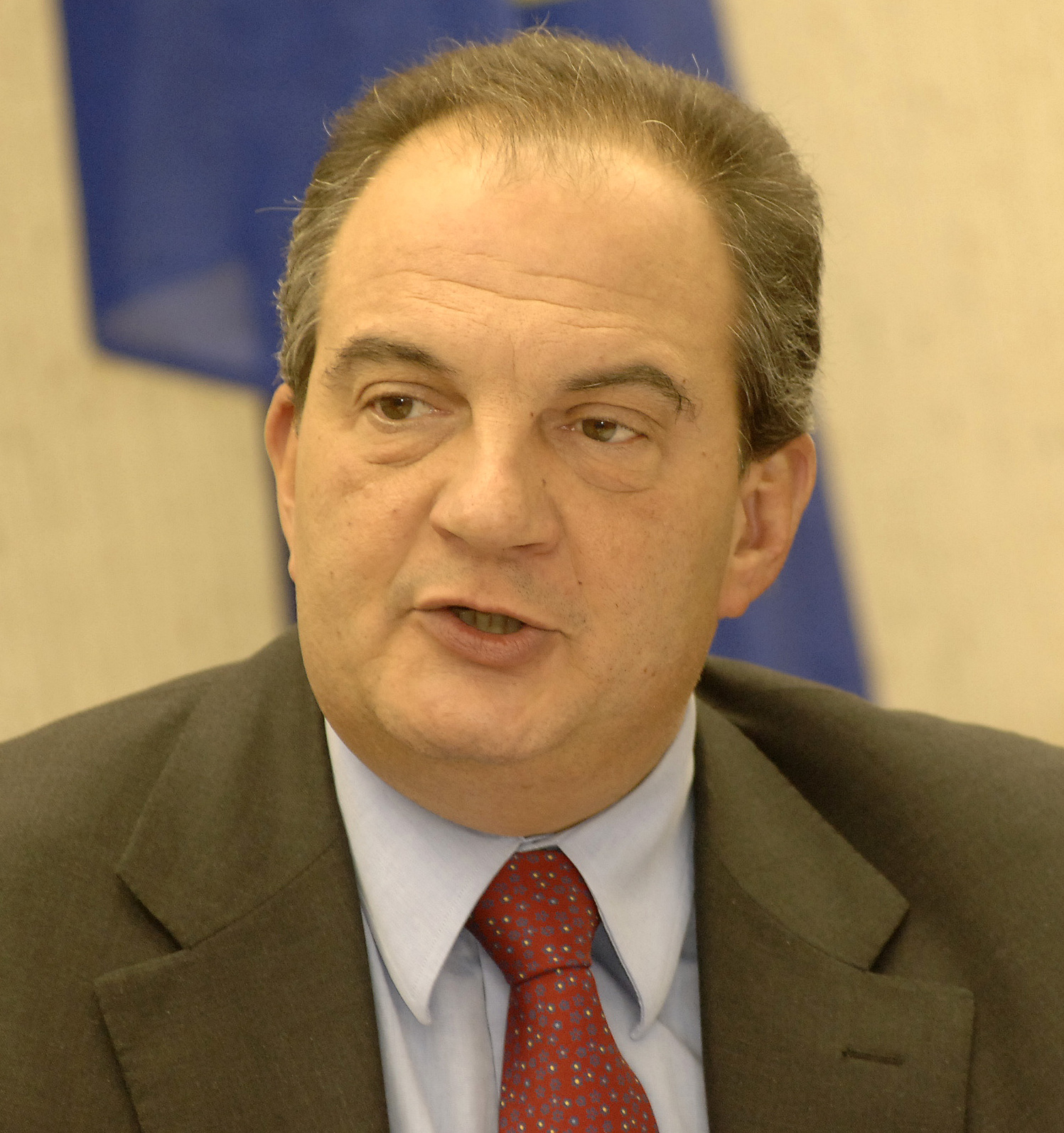
- Karamanlis during the 14 December 2006 EPP summit.
- Date formed: 18 September 2007
- Date dissolved: 7 October 2009

People and organisations
- Head of state: Karolos Papoulias
- Head of government: Kostas Karamanlis
- Member parties: New Democracy (ND)
- Status in legislature: Majority government
- Opposition parties: Panhellenic Socialist Movement (PASOK); Communist Party of Greece (KKE); Coalition of the Radical Left (SYRIZA); Popular Orthodox Rally (LAOS)
- Opposition leader: George Papandreou

History
- Election: 2007 Greek legislative election
- Legislature term: 12th (2007–2009)
- Predecessor: Kostas Karamanlis I cabinet
- Successor: George Papandreou Cabinet

Kostas Karamanlis served as a Prime Minister of Greece for two consecutive terms. During his incumbency, the period 2004-2009, he formed two cabinets. The second Kostas Karamanlis cabinet was formed after the 2007 elections and was succeeded by the George Papandreou Cabinet.

== Second Karamanlis cabinet, 2007–2009 ==
On September 18, 2007, after the re-election of his government, Prime Minister Kostas Karamanlis announced his second cabinet, the members of which assumed office on 19 September 2007.

As part of a reorganisation of the ministries, the incoming government announced:

- the merger of the Ministry of the Interior, Public Administration and Decentralisation and the Ministry of Public Order to form the Ministry of the Interior and Public Order;
- the merger of the Ministry of the Mercantile Marine and the Ministry of the Aegean and Island Policy to form the Ministry of Mercantile Marine and Island Policy.

On 7 January 2009, Karamanlis announced another major cabinet reshuffle.

Office	Incumbent	Since
Prime Minister	Kostas Karamanlis	10 March 2004
Minister for the Interior and Public Order	Prokopis Pavlopoulos	10 March 2004
Minister for Economy and Finance	Georgios Alogoskoufis	10 March 2004
replaced by	Yannis Papathanasiou	8 January 2009
Minister for Foreign Affairs	Dora Bakoyannis	15 February 2006
Minister for National Defence	Vangelis Meimarakis	15 February 2006
Minister for Development	Christos Folias	19 September 2007
replaced by	Kostis Hatzidakis	8 January 2009
Minister for the Environment, Physical Planning and Public Works	Georgios Souflias	10 March 2004
Minister for National Education and Religious Affairs	Evripidis Stylianidis	19 September 2007
replaced by	Aris Spiliotopoulos	8 January 2009
Minister for Employment and Social Protection	Vasilios Magginas	30 April 2007
replaced by	Fani Palli-Petralia	18 December 2007
Minister for Health and Social Solidarity	Dimitris Avramopoulos	15 February 2006
Minister for Rural Development and Food	Alexandros Kontos	19 September 2007
replaced by	Sotirios Hatzigakis	8 January 2009
Minister for Justice	Sotirios Hatzigakis	19 September 2007
replaced by	Nikos Dendias	8 January 2009
Minister for Culture and Athletics	Michalis Liapis	19 September 2007
replaced by	Antonis Samaras	8 January 2009
Minister for Tourism	Aris Spiliotopoulos	19 September 2007
replaced by	Kostas Markopoulos	8 January 2009
Minister for Transport and Communications	Kostis Hatzidakis	19 September 2007
replaced by	Evripidis Stylianidis	8 January 2009
Minister for Mercantile Marine and Island Policy	Georgios Voulgarakis	19 September 2007
replaced by	Anastasios Papaligouras	12 September 2008
Minister for Macedonia–Thrace	Margaritis Tzimas	19 September 2007
replaced by	Stavros Kalafatis	8 January 2009
Minister for State	Theodoros Roussopoulos	10 March 2004
replaced by	Prokopis Pavlopoulos (offices merged)	24 October 2008
Alternate Minister of Interior and Public Order	Christos Markogiannakis	8 January 2009

== Defunct cabinet positions ==
- Minister for Industry, Energy and Technology
- Minister for Trade
- Minister for the Press and the Media
