= First cabinet of Kostas Karamanlis =

First Cabinet of Kostas Karamanlis
- Cabinet of Greece

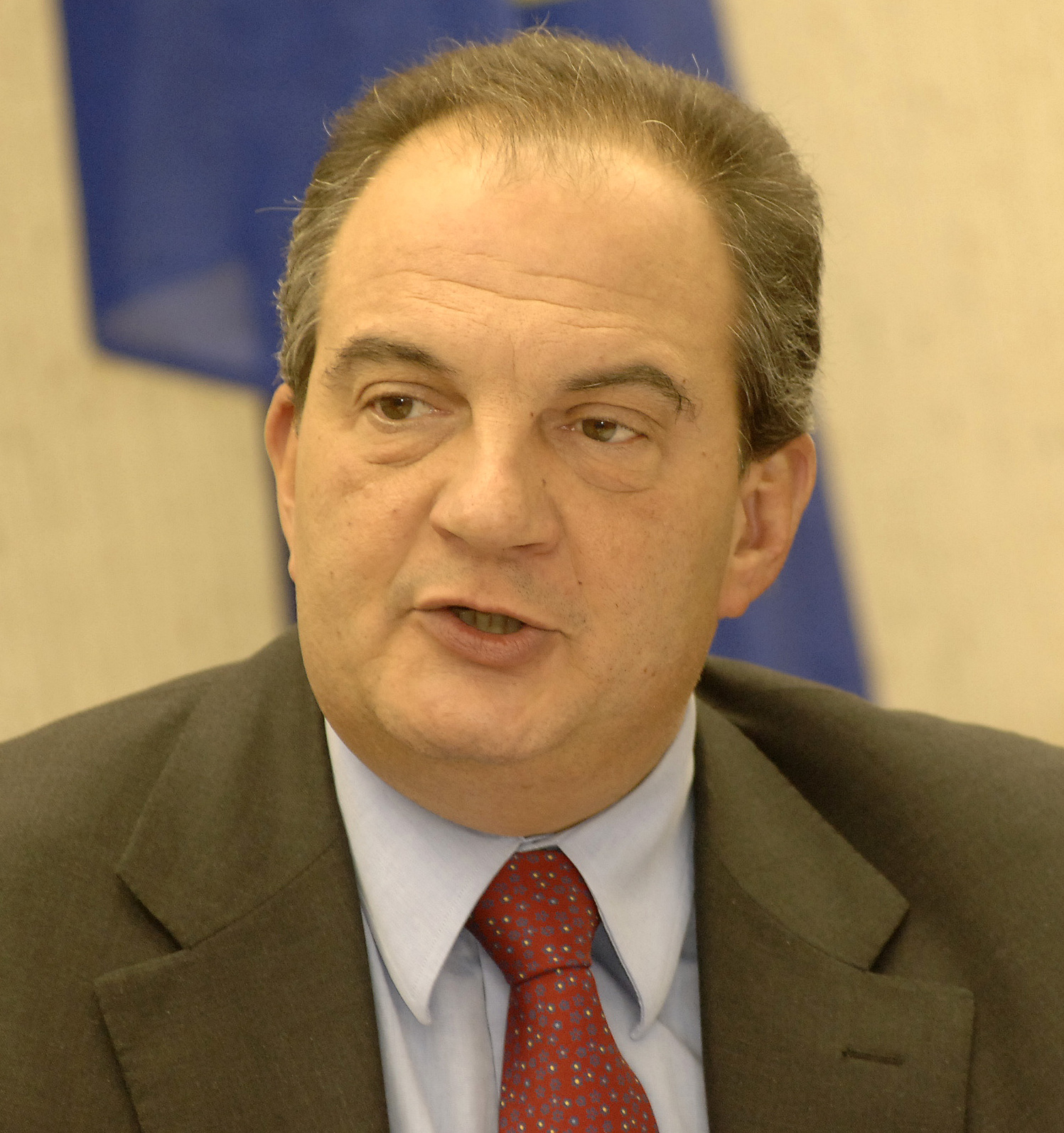
- Karamanlis during the 14 December 2006 EPP summit.
- Date formed: 10 March 2004
- Date dissolved: 18 September 2007

People and organisations
- Head of state: Konstantinos Stephanopoulos (until 12/03/05); Karolos Papoulias (from 12/03/05)
- Head of government: Kostas Karamanlis
- Member parties: New Democracy (ND)
- Status in legislature: Majority government
- Opposition parties: Panhellenic Socialist Movement (PASOK); Communist Party of Greece (KKE); Coalition of the Radical Left (SYRIZA)
- Opposition leader: George Papandreou

History
- Election: 2004 Greek legislative election
- Legislature term: 11th (2004–2007)
- Predecessor: Costas Simitis III cabinet
- Successor: Kostas Karamanlis II cabinet

Kostas Karamanlis served as a Prime Minister of Greece for two consecutive terms. During his incumbency, the period 2004-2009, he formed two cabinets. The first Karamanlis Cabinet succeeded the Panhellenic Socialist Movement (PASOK) cabinet of Costas Simitis after the 2004 elections, and was followed by Karamanlis' Second Cabinet after the 2007 elections.

== The cabinet ==
After his party's victory in the 2004 election, the new cabinet of Kostas Karamanlis was sworn in on 10 March.

In February 2006, Karamanlis announced his first major cabinet reshuffle.

Office	Incumbent	Since
Prime Minister	Kostas Karamanlis	March 10, 2004
Minister for the Aegean and Island Policy	Aristotelis Pavlidis	March 10, 2004
Minister for Culture and Athletics	Kostas Karamanlis	March 10, 2004
replaced by	Georgios Voulgarakis	February 15, 2006
Minister for Development	Dimitris Sioufas	March 10, 2004
Minister for Economy and Finance	Georgios Alogoskoufis	March 10, 2004
Minister for Employment and Social Protection	Panos Panagiotopoulos	March 10, 2004
replaced by	Savvas Tsitouridis	February 15, 2006
replaced by	Vasilios Magginas	April 30, 2007
Minister for the Environment, Spatial Planning and Public Works	Georgios Souflias	March 10, 2004
Minister for Foreign Affairs	Petros Molyviatis	March 10, 2004
replaced by	Dora Bakoyannis	February 15, 2006
Minister for Health and Social Solidarity	Nikitas Kaklamanis	March 10, 2004
replaced by	Dimitris Avramopoulos	February 15, 2006
Minister for the Interior, Public Administration and Decentralisation	Prokopis Pavlopoulos	March 10, 2004
Minister for Justice	Anastasios Papaligouras	March 10, 2004
Minister for Macedonia–Thrace	Nikos Tsiartsionis	March 10, 2004
replaced by	Georgios Kalantzis	February 15, 2006
Minister for Mercantile Marine	Manolis Kefalogiannis	March 10, 2004
Minister for National Defence	Spilios Spiliotopoulos	March 10, 2004
replaced by	Vangelis Meimarakis	February 15, 2006
Minister for National Education and Religious Affairs	Marietta Giannakou	March 10, 2004
Minister for Public Order	Georgios Voulgarakis	March 10, 2004
replaced by	Byron Polydoras	February 15, 2006
Minister for Rural Development and Food	Savvas Tsitouridis	March 10, 2004
replaced by	Evangelos Basiakos	September 23, 2004
Minister for State	Theodoros Roussopoulos	March 10, 2004
Minister for Tourism	Dimitris Avramopoulos	March 10, 2004
replaced by	Fani Palli-Petralia	February 15, 2006
Minister for Transport and Communications	Michalis Liapis	March 10, 2004
Alternate Minister for Culture and Athletics	Fani Palli-Petralia	March 10, 2004
left position when	post abolished	February 15, 2006

== See also ==
- List of cabinets of Greece
