= Korovesis =

Korovesis is a Greek surname with reputed Arvanite origins. Variations include Korovessis and Korovessi.

== People ==
- Aggelika Korovessi, Greek conceptual sculptor
- Nikos Korovesis, Greek professional footballer
- Periklis Korovesis, Greek author and journalist and a former member of the Hellenic Parliament
