= Dimitra Arapoglou =

Greek politician

Dimitra Arapoglou Δήμητρα Αράπογλου

Piraeus Prefecture (Piraeus B)
- In office September 16, 2007 – September 7, 2009

Personal details
- Born: April 21, 1958 (age 67)
- Party: Popular Orthodox Rally (LAOS)

Dimitra Arapoglou (Greek: Δήμητρα Αράπογλου) is a Greek politician. Elected for the 2007–2009 term, she was only the second deaf person in the world to be elected to a parliament. She has spoken openly about the discrimination she has faced as a deaf woman in the Greek Parliament.

Arapoglou is an active member of the Greek deaf community.

== See also ==
- List of deaf people
- List of members of the Hellenic Parliament, 2007–09
