= Anastasios Papaligouras =

Greek politician (1948–2026)

Anastasios Papaligouras (Greek: Αναστάσιος Παπαληγούρας; 14 April 1948 – 12 February 2026) was a Greek lawyer and New Democracy politician and was Minister for Mercantile Marine and Island Policy.

== Life and career ==
Born in Athens, Papaligouras studied law at the University of Athens and took a Masters in Comparative European Law at Brunel University of London (BUL). He was leader of ONNED (the New Democracy youth organisation) from 1976 to 1977. From 1976 to 1978, he was a member of the New Democracy Executive Committee, and from 1976 to 1981 he was a member of the New Democracy Administrative Committee. He was elected MP for Korinthia in the general elections of 1981, 1985, 1993, 1996 and 2000.

Following New Democracy's victory in the 2004 parliamentary election, Papaligouras became Minister for Justice in the new government of Prime Minister Kostas Karamanlis on 10 March 2004. He was replaced by Sotirios Hatzigakis in the government sworn in on 19 September 2007. On 12 September 2008, Prime Minister Kostas Karamanlis decided to give him the portfolio of the Ministry for Mercantile Marine and Island Policy, because of the resignation of the former Minister.

He was married to Zaira Ralli, daughter of Prime Minister Georgios Rallis, and had a daughter. Anastasios Papaligouras was the son of the right-wing politician Panagis Papaligouras who was appointed minister many times between 1949 and 1976 (Coordination and Plan, Foreign Affairs, Agriculture).

Papaligouras died on 12 February 2026, at the age of 77.

Preceded by Philippos Petsalnikos	Minister for Justice; 10 March 2004 – 19 September 2007	Succeeded by Sotirios Hatzigakis
Preceded by Georgios Voulgarakis	Minister for Mercantile Marine and Island Policy; 12 September 2008 – 7 October 2009	Succeeded by Louka Katseli (as Minister for Economy, Competitiveness and Mercantile Marine)
