= Nikos Dendias =

Greek politician (born 1959)

- Νίκος Δένδιας
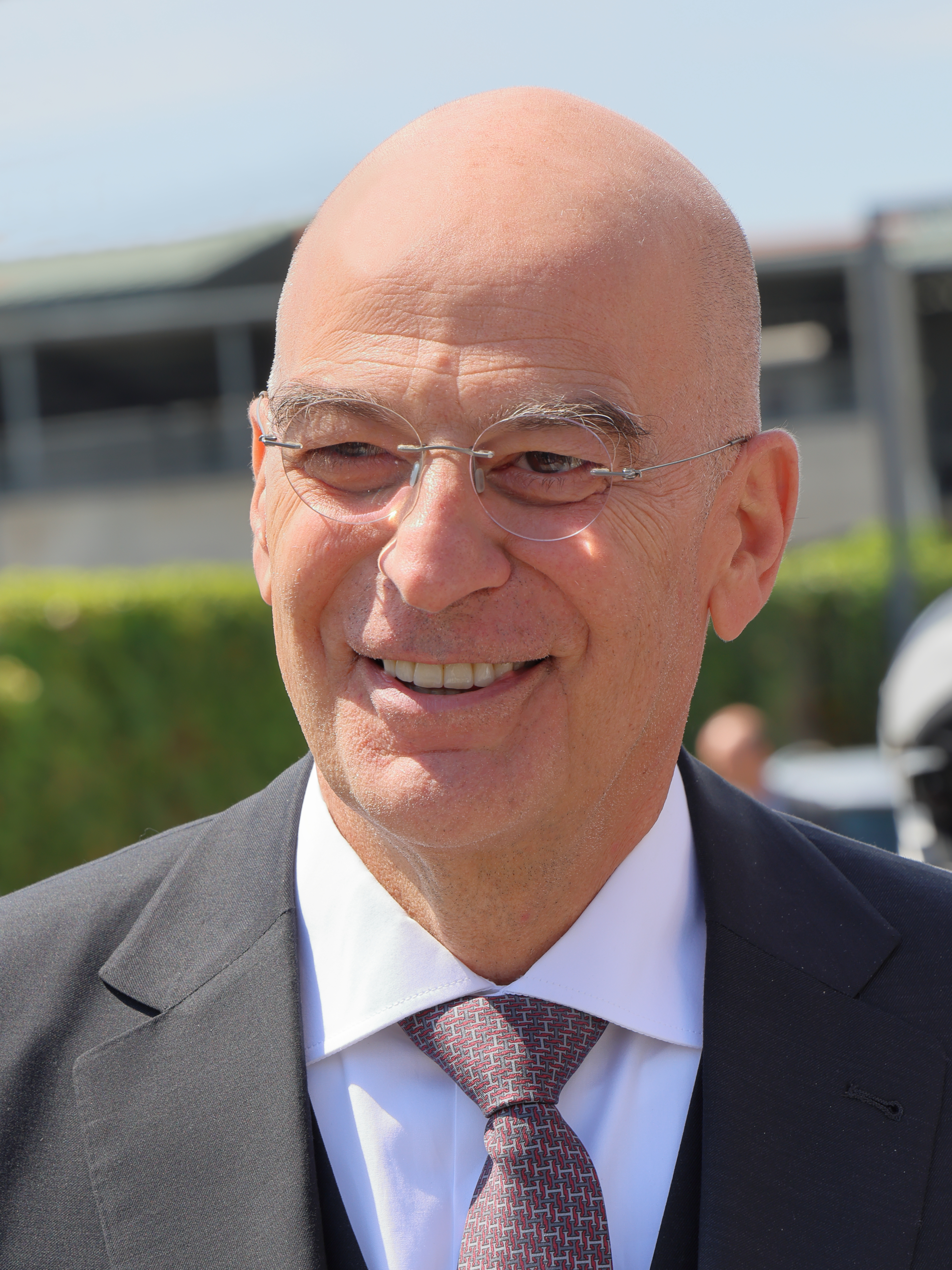
- Dendias in 2026

Minister for National Defence
- Incumbent
- Assumed office 27 June 2023
- Prime Minister: Kyriakos Mitsotakis
- Preceded by: Alkiviadis Stefanis
- In office 3 November 2014 – 27 January 2015
- Prime Minister: Antonis Samaras
- Preceded by: Dimitris Avramopoulos
- Succeeded by: Panos Kammenos

Minister for Foreign Affairs
- In office 9 July 2019 – 26 May 2023
- Prime Minister: Kyriakos Mitsotakis
- Preceded by: Georgios Katrougalos
- Succeeded by: Vasilis Kaskarelis

President of the Committee of Ministers of the Council of Europe
- In office 15 May 2020 – 18 November 2020
- Preceded by: David Zalkaliani
- Succeeded by: Heiko Maas

Minister for Development and Competitiveness
- In office 10 June 2014 – 3 November 2014
- Prime Minister: Antonis Samaras
- Preceded by: Kostis Chatzidakis
- Succeeded by: Konstantinos Skrekas

Minister for Public Order and Citizen Protection
- In office 21 June 2012 – 10 June 2014
- Prime Minister: Antonis Samaras
- Preceded by: Eleftherios Oikonomou
- Succeeded by: Vassilis Kikilias

Minister for Justice
- In office 8 January 2009 – 7 October 2009
- Prime Minister: Kostas Karamanlis
- Preceded by: Sotirios Hatzigakis
- Succeeded by: Haris Kastanidis

Personal details
- Born: 7 October 1959 (age 67) Corfu, Greece
- Party: New Democracy
- Education: National and Kapodistrian University of Athens; University College London; London School of Economics
- Website: dendias.gr

Nikolaos "Nikos" Dendias (Greek: Νικόλαος Δένδιας; born 7 October 1959) is a Greek lawyer and politician of the conservative New Democracy party who has been serving as Minister for National Defence in the government of Prime Minister Kyriakos Mitsotakis since 2023. He is a Member of the Hellenic Parliament for Athens, and previously served as Minister for National Defence from November 2014 to January 2015 and as Minister for Foreign Affairs from July 2019 to May 2023.

== Early life and education ==
Dendias was born in Corfu in 1959, but his ancestry is from the island of Paxos. He went to school in the Athens College, received a degree in law from the National and Kapodistrian University of Athens, a Master of Laws in Maritime and Insurance Law from the University College London and in Criminology from the London School of Economics.

== Political career ==
=== Early beginnings ===
A practising lawyer, Dendias has been active in New Democracy since 1978, first as a member of ND's student wing, DAP-NDFK and later as a party functionary in the Youth Organisation of New Democracy. He was elected as an MP for Corfu in the Greek parliament in the 2004, 2007, 2009 and June 2012 elections.

=== Career in government ===
On 8 January 2009, Dendias was named as Minister for Justice in the second cabinet of Kostas Karamanlis, serving briefly until the cabinet's resignation on 7 October 2009, following ND's defeat in the elections of 4 October. In the coalition cabinet of Antonis Samaras, formed after the June 2012 elections, he has first held the post of Minister for Public Order and Citizen Protection (21 June 2012 – 10 June 2014). During his time in office, he was confronted with increasing political and anti-immigrant violence. His agency was the subject of criticism over refusing asylum to Syrian refugees and detaining other migrants that flock to its borders under "unacceptable" conditions. Also, Dendias assigned the police antiterrorism unit to probe the activities of Greece's neo-Nazi Golden Dawn party and proposed a law that could block state funding for party.

In two 2014 reshuffles, Dendias became Minister for Development and Competitiveness (10 June – 3 November 2014), from 3 November 2014 to 27 January 2015, and later Minister for National Defence.

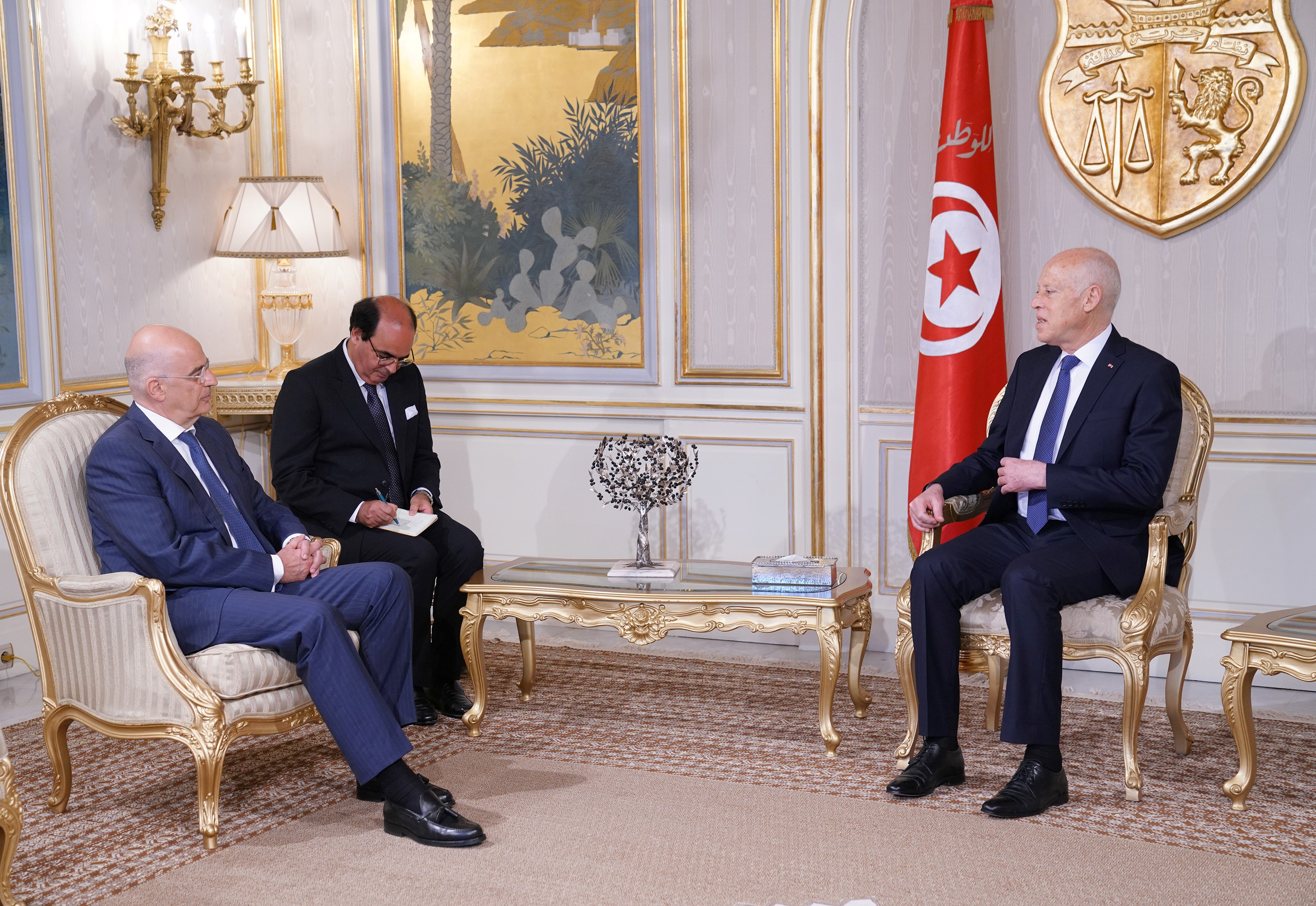
Dendias during his meeting with the President of Tunisia, Kais Saied

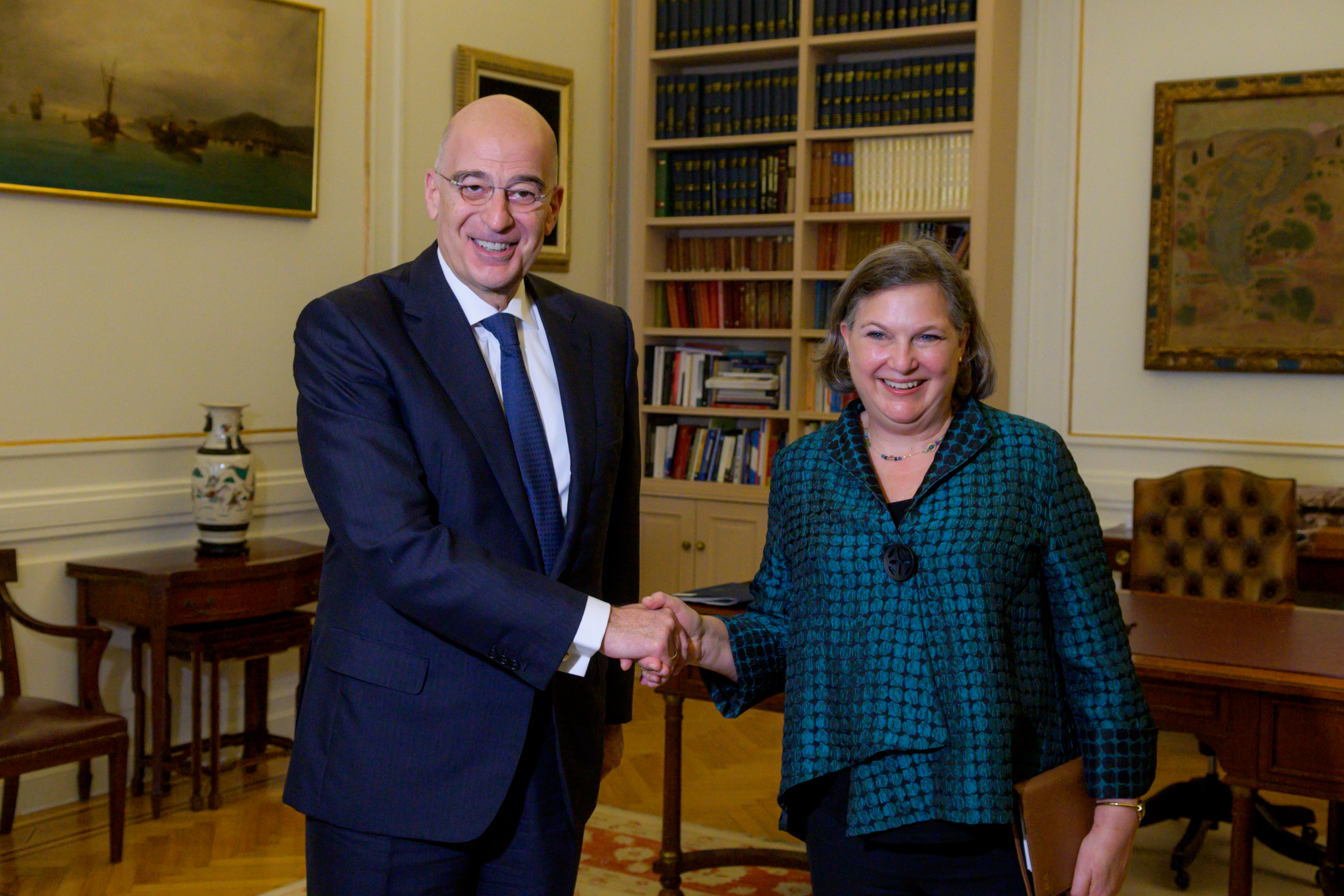
Dendias with U.S. Under Secretary of State for Political Affairs Victoria Nuland

=== Minister of Foreign Affairs, 2019–2023 ===
From 9 July 2019 to 26 May 2023 Dendias served as the Foreign Minister of Greece in Prime Minister Kyriakos Mitsotakis's New Democracy-led government which won the 2019 Greek legislative election. In August 2019, Dendias summoned the Turkish ambassador to "express Greece's deep discontent" with the arrival of sixteen boats carrying about 650 people from Turkey on Greece's Lesbos island.

In October 2019, Dendias condemned Turkey's invasion of Syria, stating that "Turkey is making a big mistake". Furthermore, about Turkey's plans for the creation of a safe zone in Northern Syria for the Syrian refugees to be resettled, at the expense of the local Kurdish population he stated that it "is illegal since the resettlement of immigrants must comply with some basic principles: to be voluntary and dignified. [...] Therefore, what Turkey does, goes against human rights".

There is a long-standing dispute between Turkey and Greece in the Aegean Sea. Dendias said that "Turkey is the only (party) responsible for the escalation of tension in the eastern Mediterranean, and it must immediately leave the Greek continental shelf."

In May 2021, he called for a two-state solution to resolve the Israeli–Palestinian conflict.

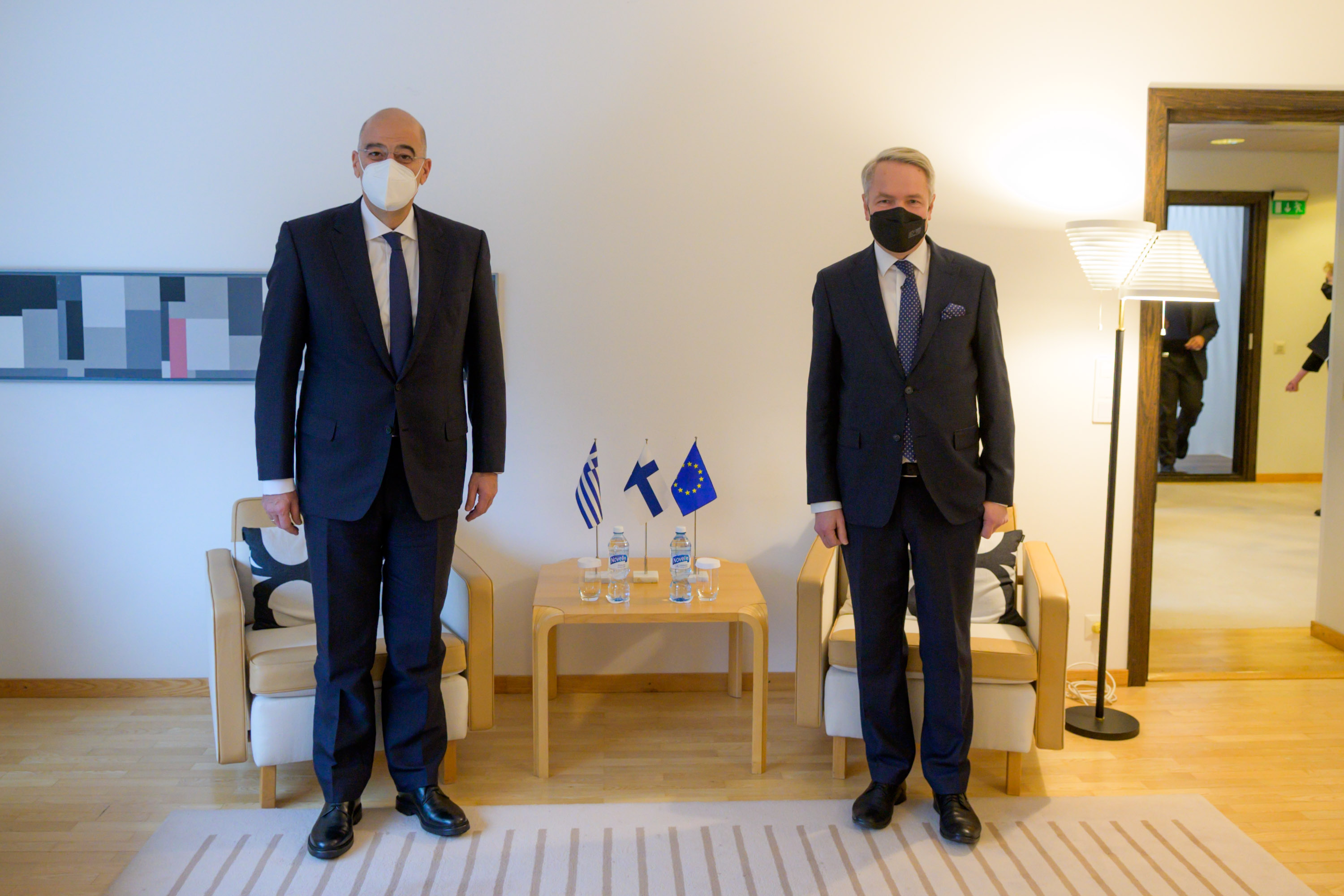
Dendias with Finnish Foreign Minister Pekka Haavisto on 15 February 2022

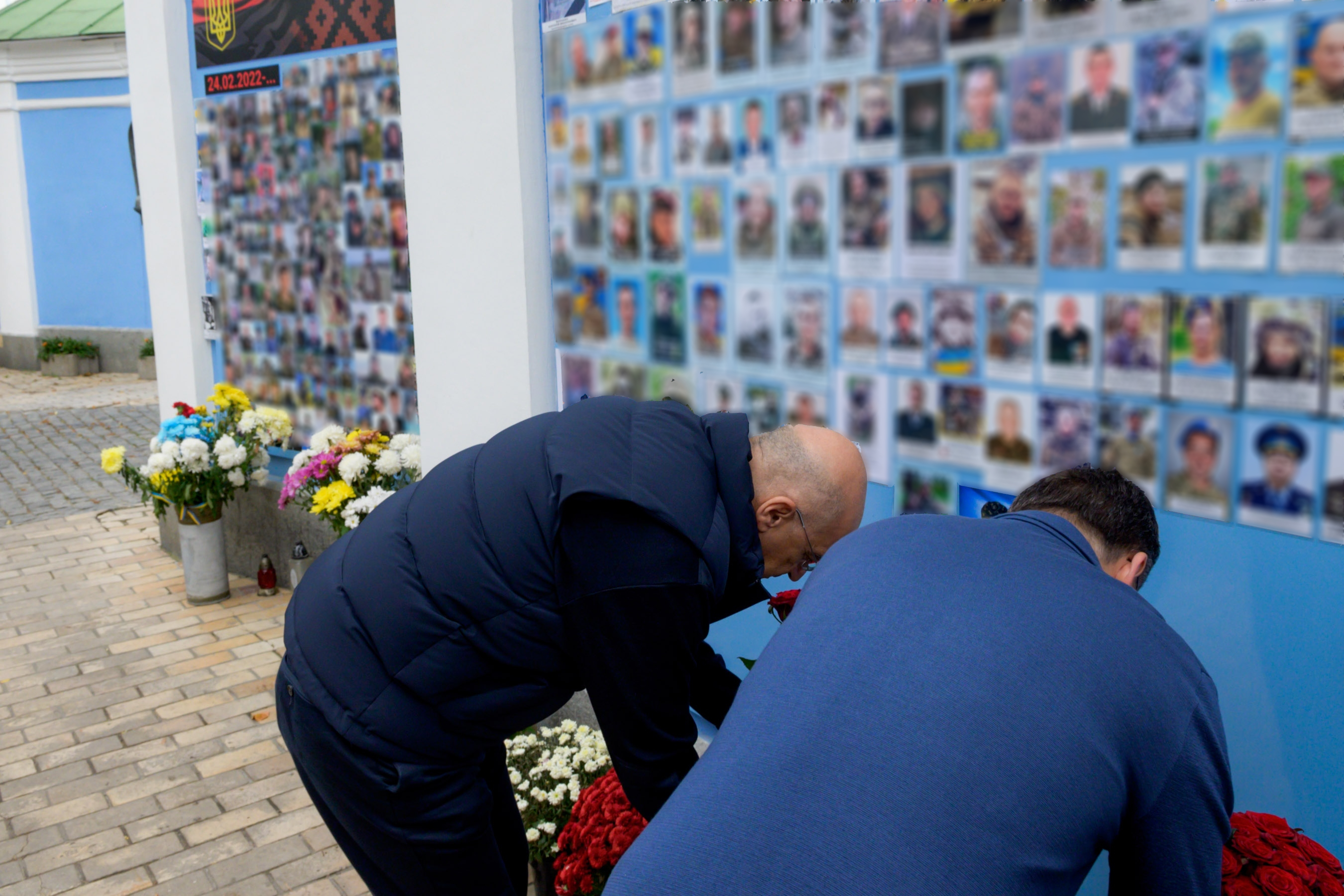
Dendias at The Wall of Remembrance of the Fallen for Ukraine near Mykhailivska Square in Kyiv on 19 October 2022

Immediately after the 2022 Russian invasion of Ukraine, Dendias summoned the Russian ambassador to Greece to protest against the fact that Greek nationals were killed and six others wounded by Russian bombing near the Ukrainian city of Mariupol.

During an official visit to Armenia on 27 September 2022, Dendias stated: "We believe in the inviolability of borders, and I am referring to" the September 2022 Armenia–Azerbaijan clashes "that happened just a few days ago following the shelling of Armenian territory, including inhabited areas, by the Azeri military forces."

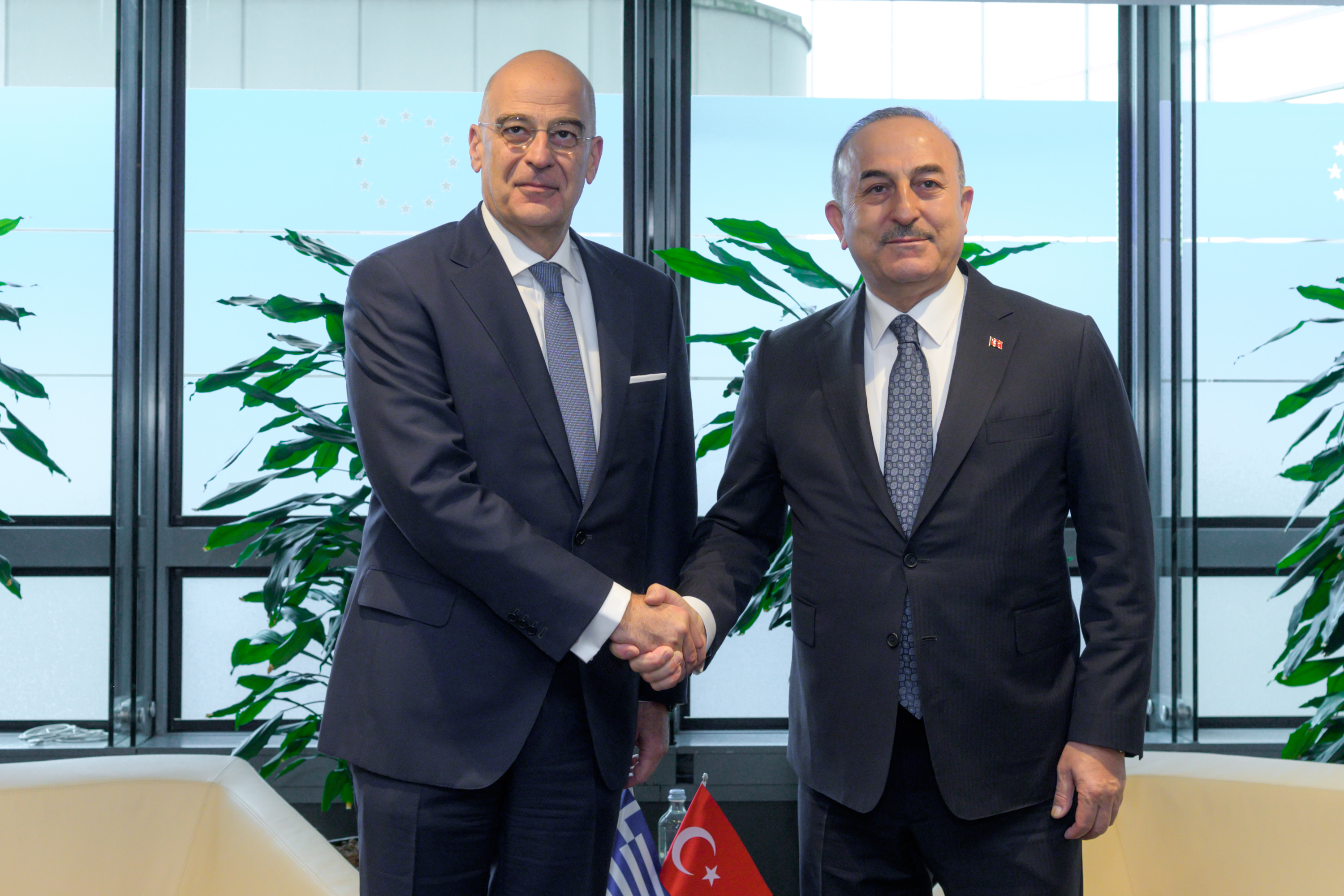
Dendias with Turkish Foreign Minister Mevlüt Çavuşoğlu on 20 March 2023

On 12 February 2023, Dendias traveled to Turkey in a new round of Greek–Turkish earthquake diplomacy following the 2023 Turkey–Syria earthquake. He was received by his Turkish counterpart Mevlüt Çavuşoğlu, and the two foreign ministers toured an operations centre coordinating rescue efforts in Antakya, observed the devastation to the city from the air, and visited a camp where international rescue teams are based.

Dendias has framed Greece's security perception around the need to deter what Greece views as an increasingly assertive and revisionist Turkey, particularly in the Aegean and Eastern Mediterranean. Central to this approach is his recently introduced "Turkey clause", a measure designed to prevent advanced weapons systems sold to Greece from being transferred to Ankara, thereby preserving Greece's qualitative military edge. Dendias' initiative reflects a broader effort to maintain the regional balance of power, limit Turkey's strategic reach, and institutionalize safeguards within Greece's defence procurement policy.
