= Papachristos =

Papachristos (Greek: Παπαχρήστος), also transliterated as Papahristos, is a Greek surname. Notable people with the surname include:

- Andrew Papachristos, American sociologist
- Kostas Papahristos (1916–1995), Greek actor
- Stergios Papachristos (born 1989), Greek rower
- Vaggelis Papachristos (born 1955), Greek politician
