= Natasa Pazaïti =

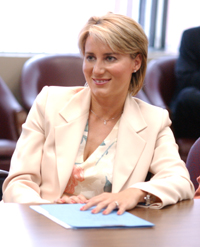
- Natasa Pazaïti, 2004

Spouse of the Prime Minister of Greece
- In role 10 March 2004 – 6 October 2009
- Prime Minister: Kostas Karamanlis
- Preceded by: Daphni Simitis
- Succeeded by: Ada Papapanou

Personal details
- Born: Anastasia Pazaiti; April 14, 1966 (age 60) Epanomi, Greece
- Spouse: Kostas Karamanlis
- Children: 2
- Education: Aristotle University of Thessaloniki
- Occupation: Resident general surgeon
- Profession: Doctor, kindergarten teacher

Anastasia Pazaiti-Karamanli (Greek: Αναστασία Παζαΐτη-Καραμανλή (Anastasía Pazaïti-Karamanlí) (born April 14, 1966), is the wife of Kostas Karamanlis, former Prime Minister of Greece. She is a resident general surgeon.

== Background, studies, career ==
She was born in Epanomi, Thessaloniki regional unit, Greece on April 14, 1966. It was there that she completed her secondary education, and also was a member of the Greek Women's Traditional Dancing Association ("Lykeio Ellinidon") for many years.

In 1988, she graduated from the School of Early Childhood Education of the Faculty of Education of the Aristotle University of Thessaloniki. She continued her studies and in 2002 she received a PhD, from the Faculty of Medicine of the Aristotle University of Thessaloniki, completing her doctoral thesis entitled “Memory and Learning in Children with Perinatal Asphyxia”. A small research part of her doctoral dissertation, which in total lasted 2.5 years, was done at Tufts University, between August and December 1997, while she was in the second year studying medicine at the Aristotle University of Thessaloniki. In 2004, she graduated from the Faculty of Medicine of the Aristotle University of Thessaloniki.

She organized the Behaviour Research Center at the Laboratory of Physiology of the Aristotle University of Thessaloniki. She has published several papers in scientific journals and congresses minutes and made a large number of announcements in Greek and international medical congresses.

She executed her countryside doctor service in Corinth and, since 2007, she has been a resident in general surgery at "Laikon" General Hospital in Athens.

The Greek media have dealt many times with her studies and how she acquired her doctoral diploma, as it has been argued that this has been done against meritocracy.

== Marriage and children ==
The relationship with the former Prime Minister of Greece Kostas Karamanlis was announced in the late 1997. The marriage took place on July 19, 1998 in Proti, Serres. In June 2003, she became the mother of twins, Alexandros and Aliki.

== Other interests ==
Natasa Pazaïti has a social and charitable contribution regarding children and regional matters, which are the center of her activities. She is the founder of the non profitable foundation “Anemi”, an initiative by the citizens with action outside the centers of big cities.

Preceded by Daphni Simitis	Spouse of the Prime Minister of Greece; 2004 - 2009	Succeeded by Ada Papandréou
