= Georgios Tryfonidis =

Greek politician (1945–2025)

- Γεώργιος Τρυφωνίδης

Member of the Hellenic Parliament for Constituency of Preveza
- In office 16 September 2007 – 7 September 2009
- In office 10 October 1993 – 11 February 2004

Personal details
- Born: 30 April 1945; Preveza, Greece
- Died: 26 June 2025 (aged 80); Athens, Greece
- Political party: ND
- Education: National Technical University of Athens
- Occupation: Civil engineer

Georgios Tryfonidis (Greek: Γεώργιος Τρυφωνίδης; 30 April 1945 – 26 June 2025) was a Greek politician. A member of New Democracy, he served in the Hellenic Parliament from 1993 to 2004 and again from 2007 to 2009.

Tryfonidis died in Athens on 26 June 2025, at the age of 80. He was buried at the First Cemetery of Athens on Monday the 30th of June 2025.
