= Ilias Polatidis =

Greek politician

Ilias Polatidis (Greek: Ηλίας Πολατίδης; c. 1966 – 16 April 2016) was a Greek politician. He was a member of the Popular Orthodox Rally.

Polatidis was born in Lefkonas, Serres. He studied mechanical engineering at the Aristotle University of Thessaloniki.

Polatidis was a member of the Popular Orthodox Rally since 2001.

Polatidis was a candidate MP in the 2004 and in 2007 parliamentary elections in Serres, where he got elected.
