= Sotirios Hatzigakis =

Greek politician (born 1945)

Sotirios Hatzigakis (Greek: Σωτήριος Χατζηγάκης; born 10 October 1945) is a Greek politician.

Born in Trikala, Hatzigakis studied law at the University of Athens, where he gained his bachelor's degree. He obtained a master's degree from the University College London, United Kingdom in Economics and from the Sorbonne of Paris, France in political science.

== Political career ==
Sotirios Hatzigakis is a 4th-generation politician. He is the offspring of a big political family in Greece. The first Hatzigakis that entered the Parliament was elected in the 1892 Greek legislative election. Since 1892, the Hatzigakis family has always had a representative in the Parliament. Hatzigakis is also the cousin of Evangelos Averoff who was Foreign Minister of Greece and Defense Minister of Greece during the 1960s and 1970s and one of the leading figures in the New Democracy (ND).

Following the collapse of the Greek military junta of 1967-1974, Hatzigakis decided to run for parliament MP with ND. In the 1974 Greek legislative election, Hatzigakis was elected first in his electorate district Trikala and became the youngest member in the Parliament at the age of only 29.

Harzigakis has been elected 13 consecutive times, in the legislative elections of 1974, 1977, 1981, 1985, June 1989, November 1989, 1990, 1993, 1996, 2000, 2004, 2007, and 2009.

From the outset of his political career, Hatzigakis was involved in the accession negotiations of Greece with the European Economic Community. When his cousin Evangelos Averoff was elected the leader of New Democracy in 1981, he tried to renew the party by bringing in new politicians and getting rid of the old guard. During that period, Hatzigakis was considered his right-hand man.

In 1989, New Democracy formed a coalition government with the Coalition of the Left and Progress which at the time included the Communist Party of Greece. The government was headed by Tzannis Tzannetakis and Hatzigakis first entered the Cabinet of Greece as Alternate Minister for the National Economy and Minister for Labour.

The government was soon replaced by two further short-lived governments under Yiannis Grivas and Xenophon Zolotas. With the 1990 elections, New Democracy managed to form a single-party government under its leader Constantine Mitsotakis. Hatzigakis was appointed Alternate Minister for Trade in 1990 and Minister for Agriculture from 1991 to 1992. He resigned over matters of principle.

He re-entered the Cabinet as Minister for Justice on 19 September 2007, following New Democracy's victory in the 2007 parliamentary election. From 8 January to 7 October 2009, he served again as Minister for Rural Development and Food.

Hatzigakis has published numerous articles and studies on political, social and economic affairs. He has also participated in many international conferences and parliamentary missions. Hatzigakis is the author of 14 books. Currently he is the longest-serving member of the Hellenic Parliament.

Preceded by	Minister of Commerce; 1990-1991	Succeeded by Aristidis Kalantzakos
Preceded by Kostas Gitonas	Vice-President of the Parliament; 2004–2007	Succeeded by Giorgos Sourlas
Preceded by Anastasios Papaligouras	Minister for Justice; 19 September 2007 – 8 January 2009	Succeeded by Nikos Dendias
Preceded by Alexandros Kontos	Minister for Rural Development and Food; 8 January 2009 – 7 October 2009	Succeeded by Katerina Batzeli
