= Michalis Karchimakis =

Greek politician

Michalis Karchimakis MP
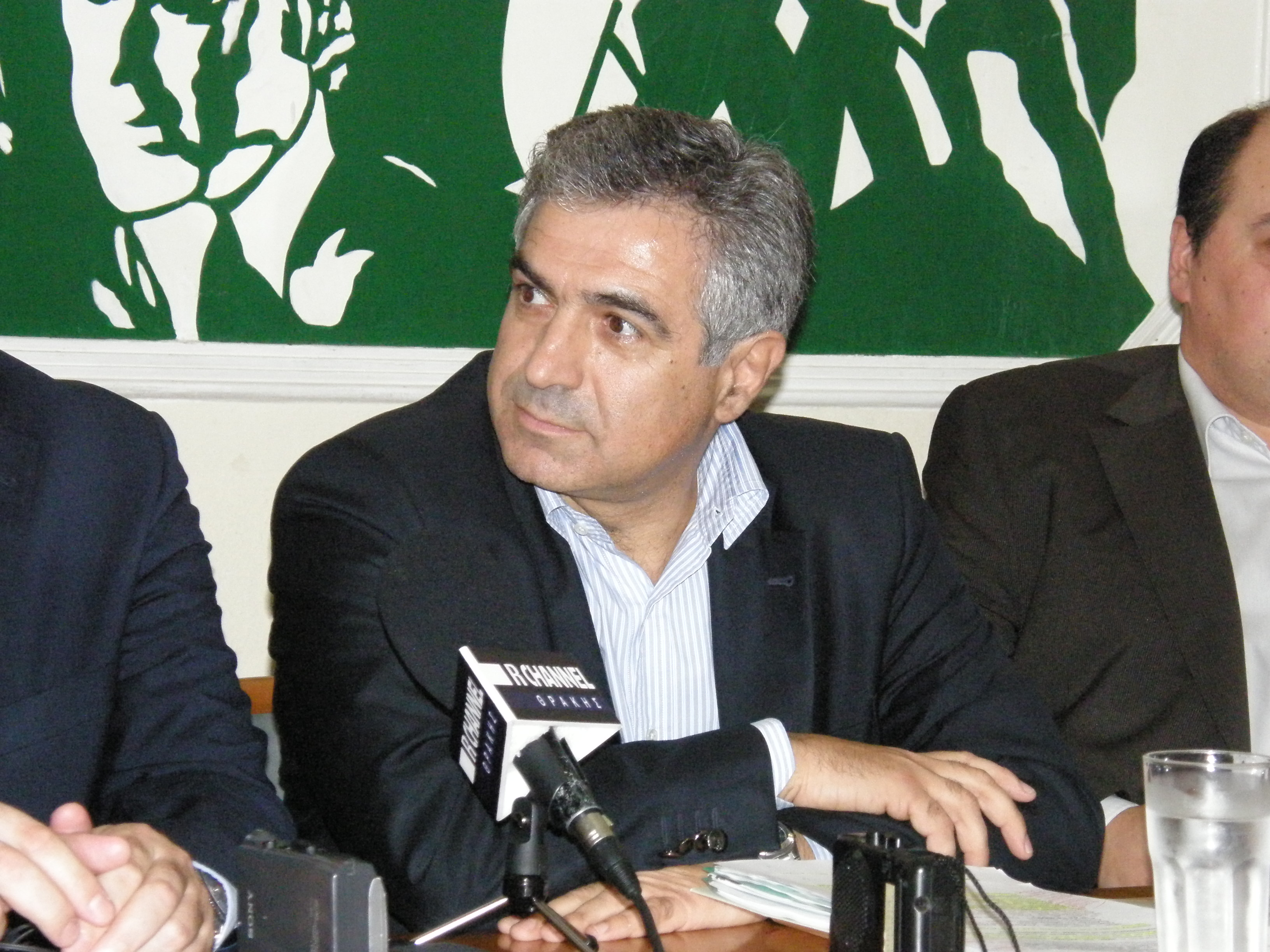

Secretary General of PASOK
- Incumbent
- Assumed office 14 September 2010
- President: George Papandreou; Evangelos Venizelos

Deputy Minister of Agricultural Development and Food
- In office 9 October 2009 – 17 May 2012
- President: Karolos Papoulias
- Prime Minister: George Papandreou

Personal details
- Born: 9 November 1957 (age 68) Siteia, Crete, Greece
- Party: PASOK
- Spouse: Maria Taliouri
- Education: National and Kapodistrian University of Athens
- Profession: Politician
- Website: www.karximakis.gr

Michalis Karchimakis (Greek: Μιχάλης Καρχιμάκης, born on 9 November 1957 in Siteia, Crete, Greece) is a Greek politician of the Panhellenic Socialist Movement (PASOK). Since 9 October 2009 to 17 May 2012 he has been the Deputy Minister for Agricultural Development and Food, and from 14 September 2010 General Secretary of PASOK.

== Life ==
Michalis Karchimakis was born on 9 November 1957 in Siteia, Crete. He graduated from the Law School of the National and Kapodistrian University of Athens with a major in Political Sciences, and completed his studies with a Post-Graduate degree in Regional Development at Panteion University.

Michalis Karchimakis became a member of the PA.SO.K. upon its foundation in 1974. He was firstly elected as a Member of the Hellenic Parliament in 1996, in his home prefecture of Lasithi, but lost his seat after an appeal in the electoral court. He was re-elected in the national elections of 2000, 2004, 2007 and 2009.

From 1993 until 1995, he served as a special advisor to then-Prime Minister Andreas Papandreou. In 1999 he was appointed as the PA.SO.K.'s deputy secretary of the agricultural section. From 2004 until 2007, he served in numerous party councils, including the Defence Committee of the PA.SO.K.'s parliamentary group as well as the anti-corruption section of the Party.

After the October 2009 elections, Michalis Karchimakis was appointed as the Deputy Minister for Agricultural Development and Food. In September 2010, he was nominated and elected as the chairman of the PA.SO.K.'s National Council.

== See also ==
- PA.SO.K.
