= Vyron Polydoras =

Greek politician

- Βύρων Πολύδωρας

Speaker of the Hellenic Parliament
- In office 18 May 2012 – 29 June 2012
- Preceded by: Philippos Petsalnikos
- Succeeded by: Vangelis Meimarakis

Personal details
- Born: 27 January 1947 (age 79) Perivolia, Kingdom of Greece
- Party: New Democracy (1981–2013)
- Education: University of Athens; Panteion University
- Profession: Politician; Lawyer

Vyron Polydoras (Greek: Βύρων Πολύδωρας, Greek pronunciation: [ˈviron poˈliðoras]; born 27 January 1947 in Perivolia, Zacharo, Elis, Greece) is a Greek politician who was the Minister for Public Order and Justice of Greece from 2006 to 2007 in the first Cabinet of Kostas Karamanlis.

He is a member of the New Democracy party and belongs to the center-right group of this party. He has a degree in law in the University of Athens. He has studied political science with a Fulbright scholarship in the United States. He has studied international law at The Hague Academy of International Law. He has also studied human rights in the University of Strasbourg. He has studied international economics in Salzburg, Austria.

He has also written more than 34 books of political, sociological and innovating content. He has been rewarded in 1998 by the Greek Association of Literature Interpreters for his work on The Eve of St. Agnes by John Keats. He received the highest praise from the Academy of Athens in 2002 for his book The Greater Athens (Greek: Η Μείζων Αθήνα). His latest new book For a New Ideology (2008) has met quite a success by the time of his release.

Polydoras was not included in the second Cabinet of Kostas Karamanlis sworn in on 19 September 2007, while the Ministry of Public Order was merged into the Ministry of the Interior. He served as fourth vice-speaker of the Hellenic Parliament in 2009–2012, and as Speaker for the hung parliament that resulted from the May 2012 elections.

In 2012 his party appointed him a member of the Special Permanent Committee on Institutions and Transparency. When soon August 2012 reports surfaced that Polydoras, who held the position of speaker of the parliament for just a single day, hired his daughter, Margarita, and made her a permanent employee in his office. This incident sparked uproar and anger among the general population. Following the incident, he was expelled from his party's parliamentary faction, but refused to give up his seat on the Institutions and Transparency committee.

In 2014, he founded the party Union for the Homeland and the People in order to take part in 2014 European Parliament Elections.

Political offices
Preceded by Georgios Voulgarakis	Minister of Public Order; 2006–2007	Vacant Title next held by Michalis Chrisochoidis as Minister for Citizen Protection
Preceded by Filippos Petsalnikos	Speaker of the Hellenic Parliament; 2012	Succeeded by Vangelis Meimarakis
Order of precedence
Preceded by Apostolos Kaklamanis as Former Speaker	Order of precedence of Greece; Former Speaker	Succeeded by Vangelis Meimarakis as Former Speaker
