= Dimitris Tsiogas =

Greek politician (1956–2010)

Dimitris Tsiogas (Greek: Δημήτρης Τσιόγκας) (born 1956 in Dolichi, Elassona - died 2010 in Larissa) was a Greek politician.

In 1975 he became a member of the Communist Youth of Greece. He was a member of the Central Committee of the Communist Party of Greece since its 18th Congress in 2008.

He was elected to the Greek Parliament in 2001 after replacing Yannis Patakis. He was reelected in the 2004 and 2007 elections. He resigned from his position in 2008, being replaced by Antonis Skyllakos.

He died in 2010 from cancer.
