= Savvas Tsitouridis =

Greek politician

- Σάββας Τσιτουρίδης

Minister for Employment and Social Protection
- In office 15 February 2006 – 30 April 2007
- Prime Minister: Kostas Karamanlis
- Preceded by: Panos Panagiotopoulos
- Succeeded by: Vasilios Magginas

Personal details
- Born: 3 February 1954 (age 72) Kilkis, Greece
- Party: New Democracy
- Spouse: Maria Papadimitropoulou (m. 1992)

Savvas Kyriakou Tsitouridis (Greek: Σάββας Κυριάκου Τσιτουρίδης; born 3 February 1954 in Kilkis) is a Greek politician and member of the New Democracy and former Minister for Employment and Social Protection. He studied law at the Aristotle University of Thessaloniki, France and Britain. Tsitouridis worked for the European Commission in Brussels from 1981 to 1990 and 1995 to 1996 on matters pertaining to agriculture, competition, state subsidies and the internal market. He has been a member of the New Democracy Central Committee since April 1994. He was elected MP in the Kilkis constituency in the general elections of 1996 - 2000 - 2004 and 2007. In June 2000, he became shadow minister for the environment, town planning and public works. In March 2004 to September 2004, he was appointed Minister for Rural Development and Food. He returned to the cabinet on 15 February 2006 as Minister for Employment and Social Protection (PM Kostas Karamanlis then made his first major cabinet reshuffle). He resigned from his position on 28 April 2007. In November 2012 he returned to his organic post at the European Commission in Brussels, which he holds since 1981.

== Footnotes ==
Preceded by	Minister for Rural Development and Food; 2004	Succeeded by Evangelos Basiakos
Preceded by Panos Panagiotopoulos	Minister for Employment and Social Protection; 2006–2007	Succeeded by Vasilios Magginas
