= Ektor Nasiokas =

Greek doctor, writer and politician

Ektor Nasiokas of Panagiotis (Greek: Έκτωρ Νασιώκας του Παναγιώτη; Petrochori, Karditsa, 19 January 1952) is a Greek doctor, writer and politician who served as Governor of Imathia from 1993 to 1995, was elected MP for Larisa with PASOK four times in the 2000 – 2009 period and acted as Assistant to the Minister of Health and Welfare from 2001 to 2004. In 2011 he resigned from Parliament, leaving PASOK, and he ran as an independent in the 2014 Larisa municipal elections. He is married to professor Maria Korlou and is the father of three children.
