= Michalis Liapis =

Greek politician (born 1951)

Michalis Liapis (Greek: Μιχάλης Λιάπης; born 8 May 1951) is a former Greek New Democracy politician and minister.

Liapis was born in Athens to Konstantinos Liapis, a lawyer, and Antigoni Karamanli (1921–2010). His mother was a younger sister of Konstantinos Karamanlis, who was four times prime minister and twice president of Greece. This means that Liapis is a nephew as well as a first cousin to former prime ministers, the latter being Kostas Karamanlis.

A graduate of the schools of law and political science of the University of Athens, Liapis attended postgraduate studies in law in Paris. He later qualified and practised as a lawyer in Greece.

== Political career ==
Following the restoration of democracy after the fall of the Regime of the Colonels, Liapis played a leading role in the establishment of ONNED, New Democracy's youth wing.

In 1977 he was appointed special advisor on communications and public relations matters at the prime minister's office, whose incumbent was his uncle Konstantinos Karamanlis.

In 1980, upon the election of Konstantinos Karamanlis as President of Greece, he was appointed director of the President's private office. Liapis retained that position until 1985, when Karamanlis' tenure ended due to the constitutional crisis triggered by Andreas Papandreou.

He was first elected a member of the Greek Parliament in the 1985 general election, when he was returned for the Greater Athens (B) constituency on the New Democracy ticket. He was reelected at every election until the 2007 general election. He kept his seat until 2009, when he announced that he would not contest that year's snap election.

From December 1992 to October 1993, he was Deputy Minister for Trade.

In March 2004 he was appointed Minister for Transport and Communications.

In September 2007 he was appointed Minister for Culture, a position he held until January 2009.

He is the author of three political books: "For a radical Renewal", "For a New Morality" and "For a Creative Overthrow".

== Arrest ==
On 17 December 2013, Liapis was arrested in Athens after he was found driving a luxury jeep with bogus number plates, for which he also had no insurance. Police had performed a check on his vehicle after he had failed to halt at a stop sign. It subsequently emerged that Liapis had handed the real license plates into the tax office in August of that year to avoid an estimated €1,320 in road taxes. Liapis was immediately fined €780 for driving an uninsured vehicle and other offences. He was due to stand trial on misdemeanour charges on 19 December, but that was postponed until 30 December. He was found guilty and sentenced to 4 years in prison, redeemable with 50 euros per day, which he paid to avoid imprisonment. In a statement issued on 19 December, New Democracy announced that it had expelled Liapis from the party.

== Personal life ==
He is married with a son and a daughter.

Preceded by Christos Verelis	Minister for Transport and Communications; 10 March 2004 – 19 September 2007	Succeeded by Kostis Hatzidakis
Preceded by Georgios Voulgarakis	Ministers of Culture and Sport; 19 September 2007 – 8 January 2009	Succeeded by Antonis Samaras
