= Christos Verelis =

Greek politician (born 1950)

- Χρήστος Βερελής
- Born: June 3, 1950 (age 75); Athens
- Political party: PASOK
- Children: 1 male, 3 female

Christos Verelis (Greek: Χρήστος Βερελής, born 3 June 1950) is a Greek politician.

== Biography ==
Born in Athens, was the Greek Minister for Transport and Communications from April 13, 2000, to March 10, 2004. Graduating from the German School of Athens, Christos Verelis studied chemistry at the Aristotle University of Thessaloniki and later on completed his Ph.D. in the chemistry of natural products in Heidelberg University, Germany. Christos Verelis speaks the languages English, German and French. In the general elections of 1996 and 2000, he was elected MP (PASOK) for Aetolia-Acarnania. From 1996 to 13 April 2000, Verelis was Deputy Minister for the Environment, Town Planning and Public Works. Besides that, he was managing director of the Hellenic Oil Refinery in Aspropyrgos, and president of the ASPROFOS company (1986–1989). Worked in the private sector (1989–1993). President of the Public Petroleum Corporation (1993–1996); during his term, he recommended the merger of the group into a single company and a share issue. Chairman and managing director of the Public Gas Corporation (1993–1996). Chairman of the Greek Chemists’ Union (1985–1993). Member of the PASOK Central Committee since 1996. President of the Greek Community in Heidelberg, and member of the Presidium of the Greek Communities in Germany. He had worked for large chemical companies in Germany and then in Greece until 1996. Christos Verelis is also member of the Standing Committee on Economic Affairs. He is the father of a son and three daughters.

In May 2009, he resigned from the Greek Parliament out of political sensitivity over scandal allegations. In May 2011, the investigation into the case was completed and didn’t reveal any ministerial responsibility. In the October 2009 national elections, Christos Verelis did not run for seat in the Parliament due to disagreements with his party leader.

=== Research in Heidelberg and Echinacea ===
During his doctoral studies at Heidelberg University, Verelis completed a dissertation entitled Untersuchung der lipophilen Inhaltsstoffe von Radix Echinaceae angustifoliae D.C. (1978), which focused on the chemical analysis of the lipophilic constituents of the root of Echinacea angustifolia. Part of his research was published in 1977 in the journal Planta Medica under the title "Die n-Alkane von Echinacea angustifolia" (co-authored with H. Becker). This study is considered one of the earliest systematic European investigations into the composition of Echinacea and contributed to expanding scientific and pharmacological knowledge of the plant in Europe.

Preceded by Tasos Mantelis	Minister for Transport and Communications; 2000–2004	Succeeded by Michalis Liapis
