= Periklis Korovesis =

Greek politician and writer (1941–2020)

- Περικλής Κοροβέσης
- Born: 20 July 1941; Argostoli, Kefalonia, Greece
- Died: 11 April 2020 (aged 78); Athens, Greece
- Other name: Pericles Korovessis
- Occupations: Author, journalist, and member of the Hellenic Parliament
- Notable work: The Method: A Personal Account of the Tortures in Greece (Anthropofylakes in Greek)

Periklis Korovesis (Greek: Περικλής Κοροβέσης; 20 July 1941 – 11 April 2020), also published as Pericles Korovessis, was a Greek author and journalist and a member of the Hellenic Parliament.

== Biography ==
Korovesis was born in Argostoli, Kefalonia, in 1941. He studied theatre with Dimitris Rontiris and Semiotics with Roland Barthes. He also attended some classes of Pierre Vidal-Naquet in Paris. From an early age, Korovesis participated actively in the democratic movement. During the military junta (1967–1974) he was arrested, imprisoned and exiled. His first book, The Method: A Personal Account of the Tortures in Greece (Anthropofylakes in Greek), is a personal account of the tortures that he experienced at the police headquarters in Bouboulinas Street at the time of the Colonels' military junta. Korovesis' story was a significant testimony for Amnesty International and the Council of Europe in order to file charges against the regime of the colonels for the appalling treatment of political prisoners.

=== Parliamentary and social activities ===
Korovesis was an elected Member of Parliament with the left-wing party Coalition of the Radical Left (SY.RIZ.A) in the 2007 Greek legislative election for the Athens A constituency. He failed to be re-elected MP in 2009 elections. He was an advocate of human rights, immigrants, environmental issues and Greek diaspora.

== Work ==
Korovesis' first book titled Anthropofylakes has been translated into French (Seuil, 1969), English (Allison & Busby, 1970, and Panther, 1970), Swedish (Rubén et Sjӧrgen, 1970), Finnish (Weilin+Gӧӧs, 1970), Norwegian (Gyldendal, 1973), Turkish (Yӧntem, 1972, & Alan Yayincilik, 1989), German (Zweitausendeins,1981 and Raith,1976), Portuguese (Publicaciōes Europa-America,1970). He also wrote poetry and children's stories.

Korovesis wrote articles for Eleftherotypia, Epochi and Efimerida ton Syntakton newspapers and for the magazine Galera. His personal blog was titled Left Recycling.

== Death ==
Korovesis died, aged 78, in an Athens hospital on 11 April 2020.
