= Georgios Voulgarakis =

Greek politician

- Γιώργος Βουλγαράκης

Minister of Public Order
- In office 10 March 2004 – 14 February 2006
- Prime Minister: Kostas Karamanlis
- Preceded by: Michalis Chrisochoidis
- Succeeded by: Vyron Polydoras

Minister for Mercantile Marine and Island Policy
- In office 19 September 2007 – 13 September 2008
- Prime Minister: Kostas Karamanlis
- Preceded by: office established
- Succeeded by: Anastasios Papaligouras

Minister for Culture
- In office 15 February 2006 – 19 September 2007
- Preceded by: Kostas Karamanlis
- Succeeded by: Michalis Liapis

Personal details
- Born: 4 June 1959 Heraklion, Kingdom of Greece
- Party: New Democracy
- Spouse: Katerina Peleki
- Children: 4
- Education: University of Piraeus; Athens University of Economics and Business

Georgios Voulgarakis (Greek: Γιώργος Βουλγαράκης; born 4 June 1959) is a Greek politician and the former Minister for Mercantile Marine, Aegean Sea and Island Policy.

Voulgarakis was born in Crete and holds a PhD in Political Marketing and Communication from the University of Athens. He is a member of the New Democracy party. He has been elected to parliament from the Athens A' Election Area constituency since the June 1989 parliamentary election and served as Deputy Minister for the Environment, Spatial Planning and Public Works from 3 December 1992 to 12 October 1993. He was Minister of Public Order in the government of Prime Minister Costas Karamanlis from 10 March 2004, at the difficult period of Athens Olympic Games 2004, until a cabinet reshuffle on 14 February 2006, when he was named Minister of Culture instead. This was considered a demotion in the wake of a phone-tapping scandal.

A Greek prosecutor has backed claims by a group of Pakistani men that they were abducted by Greek and British intelligence agents in the wake of the London bombings. Georgios Voulgarakis denied any involvement but main opposition party PASOK and Human Rights Groups called for the resignation of Voulgarakis from his cabinet position.

On May 30, 2006, Voulgarakis survived a bombing. A far-left Greek terrorist group, Revolutionary Struggle, placed over two pounds of explosives strapped to a bicycle near his residence, and then detonated the device by remote control. No injuries resulted from the explosion, but four parked cars and a school building were damaged. It is unclear whether this was an attempted assassination.

Following New Democracy's victory in the September 2007 parliamentary election, Voulgarakis was moved from his position as Minister for Culture to become Minister of Mercantile Marine, Aegean Sea and Island Policy in the Cabinet sworn in on 19 September 2007. One of the biggest successes was the hiring of a part of the port of Piraeus to the China's Cosco Pacific. On September 12, 2008 the Minister Voulgarakis resigned from his position, by touchiness, because the name of his wife was involved in the case (land-exchange) of Vatopedi monastery in Mount Athos. After 2 years legal research, the Greek Parliament and particularly Voulgarakis’ political opponents (PASOK party) acquitted him to involvement to this case (November 2010).

Preceded by Michalis Chrisochoidis	Minister for Public Order; 2004–2006	Succeeded by Byron Polydoras
Preceded by Kostas Karamanlis	Minister for Culture; 2006–2007	Succeeded by Michalis Liapis
Preceded by New ministry	Minister for Mercantile Marine and Island Policy; 2007–2008	Succeeded by Anastasios Papaligouras
