= Ministry of Culture (Greece) =

Government ministry of Greece

- Υπουργείο Πολιτισμού
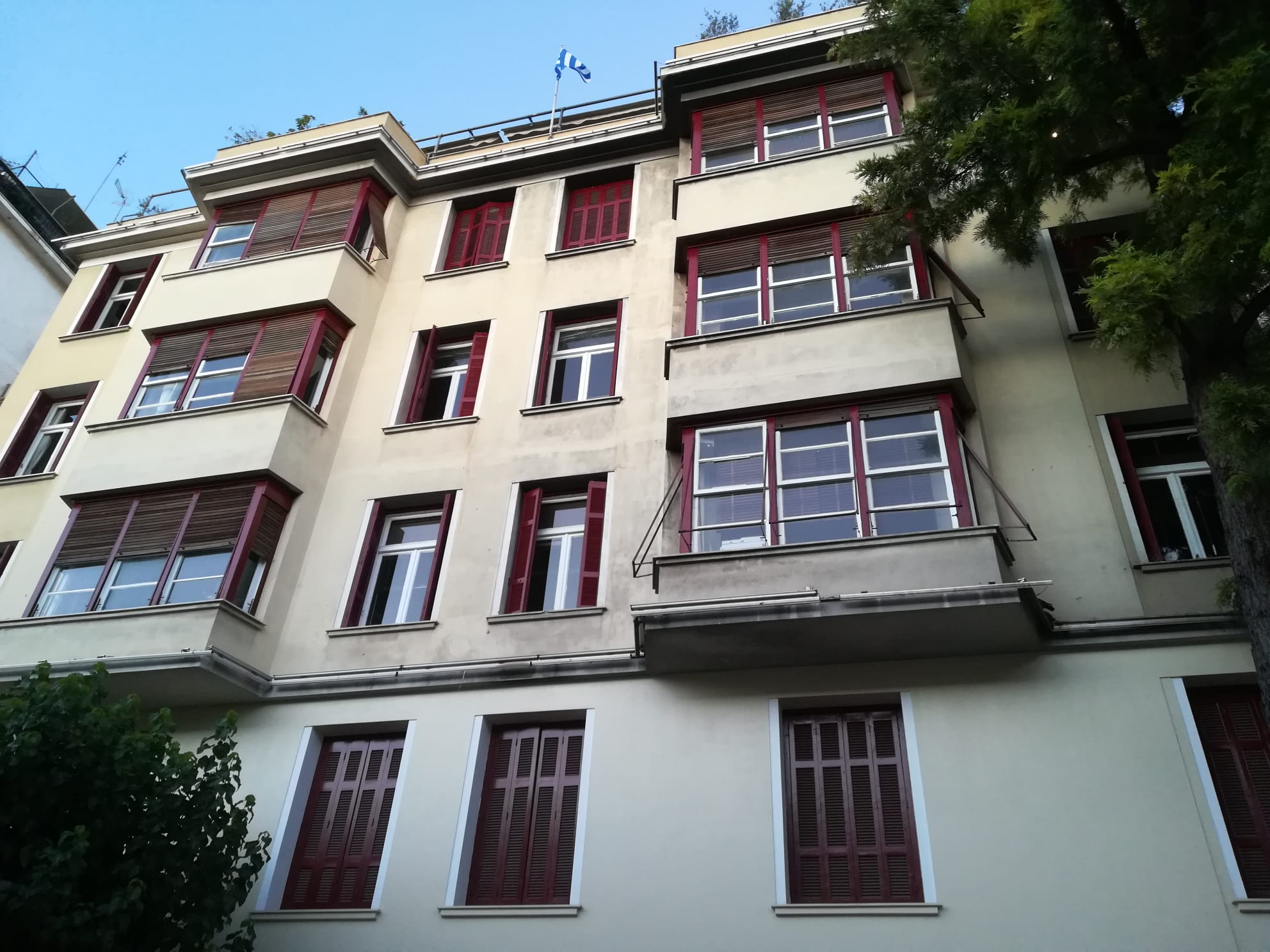
- Logothetopoulos apartment building, headquarters of the Ministry of Culture

Agency overview
- Formed: August 1971
- Preceding agency: Ministry of Culture and sports
- Type: Ministry
- Jurisdiction: Government of Greece
- Headquarters: Athens; 37°59′19″N 23°44′1″E
- Employees: 6.247 (2024)
- Annual budget: 189.293.000 €(2025)
- Minister responsible: Lina Mendoni
- Deputy minister responsible: Iason Fotilas, for Contemporary Culture
- Agency executive: Giorgos Didaskalou, Secretary General for Culture
- Child agencies: Acropolis Museum; National Theatre of Greece; Athens Epidaurus Festival; National Gallery (Athens); Thessaloniki International Film Festival; Natural History Museum of the Lesvos Petrified Forest
- Website: https://www.culture.gov.gr/en/

The Ministry of Culture (Greek: Υπουργείο Πολιτισμού) is the government department of Greece entrusted with preserving the country's cultural heritage and promoting the arts. The incumbent minister is Lina Mendoni, and the deputy minister is Iason Fotilas.

== History ==
This ministry was established on 26 August 1971 as the Ministry of Culture and Sciences (Ὑπουργεῖον Πολιτισμοῦ καὶ Ἐπιστημῶν), and was renamed the Ministry of Culture (Υπουργείο Πολιτισμού) on 26 July 1985. On 7 October 2009, it was merged with the Ministry of Touristic Development to form the Ministry of Culture and Tourism. It ceased to exist on 21 June 2012, when the Ministry of Tourism was re-established and the culture portfolio was absorbed by the Ministry of Education, Lifelong Learning and Religious Affairs to form the Ministry of Education, Religious Affairs, Culture and Sports. A separate Ministry of Culture and Sports was re-established on 25 June 2013, but on 27 January 2015 it was again merged with the education ministry to form the Ministry of Culture, Education and Religious Affairs. On 23 September 2015, the merger was reversed and the culture and education portfolios were restored as separate ministries. On 27 June 2023, the sports portfolio was absorbed by the education ministry and the Ministry of Culture reverted to its 1985–2009 name.

== List of ministers ==
=== Culture and sciences (1971–1985) ===
#	Name	Took office	Left office	Party
1.	Konstantinos Panagiotakis	26 August 1971	25 November 1973	
2.	Dimitrios Tsakonas	25 November 1973	24 July 1974	
3.	Konstantinos Tsatsos	24 July 1974	9 October 1974	National Radical Union
4.	Ioannis M. Panagiotopoulos	9 October 1974	21 November 1974	
5.	Konstantinos Trypanis	21 November 1974	28 November 1977	New Democracy
6.	Georgios Plytas	28 November 1977	25 September 1978	New Democracy
7.	Dimitrios Nianias	25 September 1978	10 May 1980	New Democracy
8.	Andreas Andrianopoulos	10 May 1980	21 October 1981	New Democracy
9.	Melina Mercouri	21 October 1981	26 July 1985	PASOK

=== Culture (1985–2009) ===
#	Name	Took office	Left office	Party
	Melina Mercouri	26 July 1985	2 July 1989	PASOK
10.	Anna Psarouda-Benaki (first term)	2 July 1989	7 July 1989	New Democracy
11.	Georgios Mylonas (first term)	7 July 1989	23 November 1989	New Democracy
12.	Sotiris Kouvelas	23 November 1989	13 February 1990	New Democracy
	Georgios Mylonas (second term)	13 February 1990	11 April 1990	New Democracy
13.	Tzannis Tzannetakis	11 April 1990	8 August 1991	New Democracy
	Anna Psarouda-Benaki (second term)	8 August 1991	3 December 1992	New Democracy
14.	Dora Bakoyanni	7 December 1992	13 October 1993	New Democracy
	Melina Mercouri (second term)	13 October 1993	6 March 1994 (death in office)	PASOK
15.	Thanos Mikroutsikos	16 March 1994 (acting minister from 6 March)	22 January 1996	PASOK
16.	Stavros Benos	22 January 1996	25 September 1996	PASOK
17.	Evangelos Venizelos (first term)	25 September 1996	19 February 1999	PASOK
18.	Elisavet Papazoi	19 February 1999	13 April 2000	PASOK
19.	Theodoros Pangalos	13 April 2000	20 November 2000	PASOK
	Evangelos Venizelos (second term)	20 November 2000	10 March 2004	PASOK
20.	Kostas Karamanlis	10 March 2004	15 February 2006	New Democracy
21.	Georgios Voulgarakis	15 February 2006	19 September 2007	New Democracy
22.	Michalis Liapis	19 September 2007	7 January 2009	New Democracy
23.	Antonis Samaras	8 January 2009	7 October 2009	New Democracy

=== Culture and tourism (2009–2012) ===
#	Name	Took office	Left office	Party
24.	Pavlos Geroulanos	7 October 2009	17 May 2012	PASOK (Giorgos Papandreou Cabinet and Cabinet of Lucas Papademos)
25.	Tatiana Karapanagioti	17 May 2012	21 June 2012	PASOK in Caretaker Cabinet of Panayiotis Pikrammenos

=== Education, religious affairs, culture and sports (2012–2013) ===
#	Name	Took office	Left office	Party
26.	Konstantinos Arvanitopoulos	21 June 2012	25 June 2013	New Democracy

=== Culture and sports (2013–2015) ===
#	Name	Took office	Left office	Party
27.	Panos Panagiotopoulos	25 June 2013	10 June 2014	New Democracy
28.	Konstantinos Tasoulas	10 June 2014	27 January 2015	New Democracy

=== Culture, education and religious affairs (2015) ===
Name	Took office	Left office	Party	Notes
Aristides Baltas	27 January 2015	27 August 2015	Syriza	Coalition government
Frosso Kiaou	28 August 2015	21 September 2015	Independent	Caretaker government

=== Culture and sports (2015–2023) ===
#	Name	Took office	Left office	Party
29.	Aristides Baltas	23 September 2015	5 November 2016	Syriza
30.	Lydia Koniordou	5 November 2016	29 August 2018	Syriza
31.	Myrsini Zorba	29 August 2018	9 July 2019	Syriza
32.	Lina Mendoni	9 July 2019	26 May 2023	Independent in the Cabinet of Kyriakos Mitsotakis
33.	George Koumendakis	26 May 2023	27 June 2023	Independent

=== Culture (since June 2023) ===
#	Name	Took office	Left office	Party
34.	Lina Mendoni	27 June 2023		Independent in the Cabinet of Kyriakos Mitsotakis
