= Alexandros Kontos =

Greek footballer

Personal information
- Date of birth: 12 September 1986 (age 40)
- Place of birth: Drama, Greece
- Height: 1.76 m (5 ft 9 in)
- Position: Winger

Youth career
- Doxa Drama

Senior career*
Years	Team	Apps	(Gls)
2004–2007	Doxa Drama	44	(1)
2007	PAS Giannina	0	(0)
2007–2009	Kastoria	49	(7)
2009–2013	Panserraikos	70	(8)
2013–2019	Kerkyra	163	(30)
2019–2026	Doxa Drama	27	(3)
- * Club domestic league appearances and goals as of 18 May 2021

Alexandros Kontos (Greek: Αλέξανδρος Κόντος; born 12 September 1986) is a Greek former professional footballer who plays as a winger.
