= Vaggelis Papachristos =

Greek politician

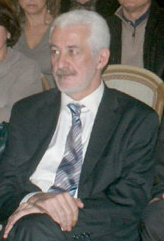
- Vaggelis Papachristos in 2010
- Born: 1955 (age 69–70)
- Occupation: Politician

Vaggelis Papachristos (Greek: Βαγγέλης Παπαχρήστος; born 1955) is a Greek politician.

During the Greek military junta of 1967–1974 he was arrested for his anti-junta activism as a student and sentenced to six years imprisonment. He was released after the collapse of the junta's military rule and the re-establishment of democratic institutions in July 1974.

He was member of the central committee of the Communist Party of Greece. He left CPG and joined Panhellenic Socialist Movement (PASOK) in 1989.

He was elected to the Greek Parliament for the first time in 2007.

In December 2010 he was outed from PASOK for voting against the proposed law on restructuring labour relations and state owned enterprises.
