= Ministry of Rural Development and Food (Greece) =

Government ministry of Greece

- Υπουργείο Αγροτικής Ανάπτυξης και Τροφίμων

Agency overview
- Formed: 28 April 1910
- Preceding agency: Ministry of Agriculture (1917–2004)
- Type: Ministry
- Jurisdiction: Government of Greece
- Status: active
- Headquarters: Athens
- Employees: 1812 (2024)
- Annual budget: €1,281,403,000 (2025)
- Minister responsible: Margaritis Schinas
- Deputy Ministers responsible: Giannis Andrianos; Athanasios Kavvadas
- Agency executives: Spyros Protopsaltis, General Secretariat of Rural Development and Food; Argyro Zerva, General Secretariat of European Funds and Infrastructure; Antonios Filippis, General Secretariat of Agricultural Policy and International Relations
- Child agencies: Benaki phytopathological institute; Hellenic Food Authority; Institute of Agricultural Research; OPEKEPE (defunct)

The Ministry of Rural Development and Food (Greek: Υπουργείο Αγροτικής Ανάπτυξης και Τροφίμων) is a ministry of the Greek Government tasked with modernizing and developing the agricultural sector in Greece. Specifically, among other objectives, the ministry promotes the export orientation of the country's agricultural and fishery products while improving their quality, using the resources of the Common Agricultural Policy and the Common Fisheries Policy, and protecting the environment through the sustainable management of natural resources.

The incumbent minister is Margaritis Schinas of New Democracy.

== History ==
The ministry was established in June 1917 by the government of Eleftherios Venizelos under the title Ministry of Agriculture and Forestry. [This followed the establishment in 1910 of a joint ministry for the sectors of Agriculture, Commerce, and Industry, also by Eleftherios Venizelos, which was renamed the Ministry of National Economy in 1911.] Almost immediately after, in September 1917, it was renamed the Ministry of Agriculture, a title it held until March 2004. At that time, the government of Kostas Karamanlis renamed it the Ministry of Rural Development and Food to emphasise the development of the agricultural sector. During the first government of Alexis Tsipras, it was demoted to the level of a sub-ministry within the "Ministry of Productive Reconstruction, the Environment and Energy", before being restored as a full ministry in his second cabinet a few months later.

== List of ministers ==
=== Rural development and food (2004–2015) ===
Name	Took office	Left office	Party
Savvas Tsitouridis	10 March 2004	23 September 2004	New Democracy
Evangelos Basiakos	23 September 2004	19 September 2007	New Democracy
Alexandros Kontos	19 September 2007	7 January 2009	New Democracy
Sotirios Hatzigakis	8 January 2009	7 October 2009	New Democracy
Katerina Batzeli	7 October 2009	7 September 2010	PASOK
Kostas Skandalidis	7 September 2010	17 May 2012	PASOK
Napoleon Maravegias	17 May 2012	21 June 2012	Independent
Athanasios Tsaftaris	21 June 2012	10 June 2014	PASOK
Giorgos Karasmanis	10 June 2014	27 January 2015	New Democracy

=== Rural development and food (alternates, January–September 2015) ===
Name	Took office	Left office	Party
Evangelos Apostolou	27 January 2015	27 August 2015	Syriza
Dimitrios Melas	28 August 2015	21 September 2015	Independent

=== Rural development and food (since September 2015) ===
Name	Took office	Left office	Party
Evangelos Apostolou	23 September 2015	29 August 2018	Syriza
Stavros Arachovitis	29 August 2018	9 July 2019	Syriza
Makis Voridis	9 July 2019	5 January 2021	New Democracy
Spilios Livanos	5 January 2021	7 February 2022	New Democracy
Georgios Georgantas	7 February 2022	26 May 2023	New Democracy
Georgios Tsakiris	26 May 2023	27 June 2023	Independent
Lefteris Avgenakis	27 June 2023	14 June 2024	New Democracy
Konstantinos Tsiaras	14 June 2024	3 April 2026	New Democracy
Margaritis Schinas	4 April 2026	Incumbent	New Democracy
