= Kostas Karamanlis =

Greek politician

- Κώστας Καραμανλής
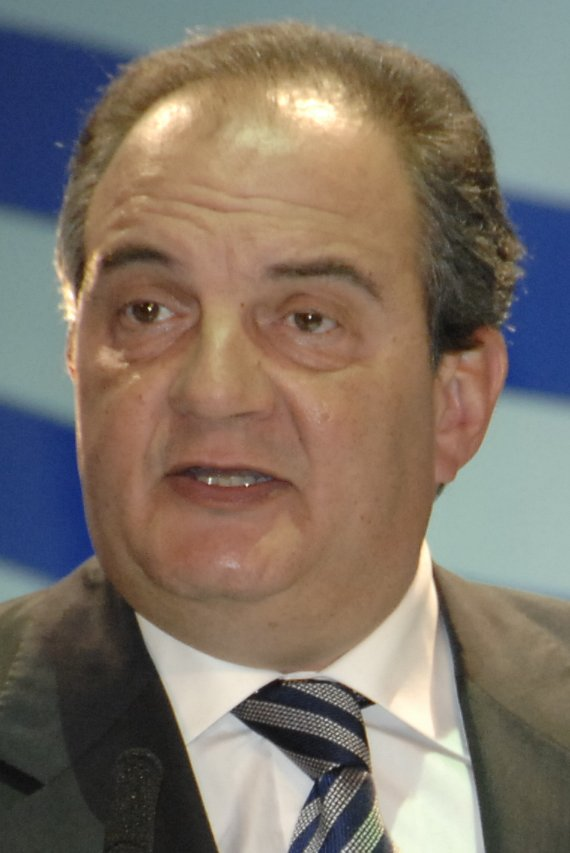
- Karamanlis in 2009

Prime Minister of Greece
- In office 10 March 2004 – 6 October 2009
- President: Konstantinos Stephanopoulos; Karolos Papoulias
- Preceded by: Costas Simitis
- Succeeded by: George Papandreou

President of New Democracy
- In office 21 March 1997 – 30 November 2009
- Preceded by: Miltiadis Evert
- Succeeded by: Antonis Samaras
Other political offices
Leader of the Opposition
In office 6 October 2009 – 30 November 2009
Prime Minister	George Papandreou
Preceded by	George Papandreou
Succeeded by	Antonis Samaras
In office 21 March 1997 – 10 March 2004
Prime Minister	Costas Simitis
Preceded by	Miltiadis Evert
Succeeded by	George Papandreou
Minister for Culture
In office 10 March 2004 – 15 February 2006
Prime Minister	Himself
Preceded by	Evangelos Venizelos
Succeeded by	Georgios Voulgarakis

Member of the Hellenic Parliament
- In office 18 June 1989 – 22 April 2023
- Constituency: Thessaloniki A

Personal details
- Born: Konstantinos Karamanlis; 14 September 1956 (age 70) Athens, Greece
- Party: New Democracy
- Spouse: Natasa Pazaïti (m. 1998)
- Children: 2
- Relatives: Konstantinos Karamanlis (uncle); Kostas Karamanlis (cousin)
- Education: University of Athens; Tufts University
- Profession: Politician; Lawyer

Konstantinos Alexandrou Karamanlis (Greek: Κωνσταντίνος Αλεξάνδρου Καραμανλής; born 14 September 1956), commonly known as Kostas Karamanlis (Greek: Κώστας Καραμανλής, pronounced [ˈkostas karamanˈlis]), is a Greek politician who served as prime minister of Greece from 2004 to 2009. He was also the president of the centre-right New Democracy party, founded by his uncle Konstantinos Karamanlis, from 1997 to 2009, and member of the Hellenic Parliament from 1989 to 2023.

Karamanlis was first elected as a member of the Hellenic Parliament for New Democracy in 1989 and became president of the party in 1997. After leading the opposition in the Hellenic Parliament for seven years and his narrow defeat in the 2000 parliamentary election, he served as the 181st Prime Minister of Greece for two consecutive terms, winning the 2004 election, with an all-time record number of votes, and again in 2007. However, he asked for mid-term general elections in 2009, as his party enjoyed a narrow parliamentary majority that could not guarantee a stable government needed to handle the Greek financial crisis, though two reports published by the National Intelligence Service in 2011 suggested a conspiracy aiming to assassinate him and destabilise the Greek state. Eventually, Karamanlis was defeated and resigned as president of New Democracy after twelve years as the party's leader, being active in politics though as a member of the parliament. On 21 February 2023, it was announced that he would not be a parliamentary candidate and that he would retire from politics after the 2023 election.

In foreign policy, his government vetoed North Macedonia's entry into NATO in 2008 due to the Macedonia naming dispute. Infrastructural improvements during his premiership, including the successful preparation for the 2004 Summer Olympics, the expansion of the Athens Metro and the beginning of construction for the Thessaloniki Metro, completion of A2 motorway (Egnatia Odos) boosted his popularity. However, after the Greek financial crisis, which had begun at the tail end of his presidency, his government was accused of perpetuating economic mismanagement, while the lack of transparency regarding corruption cases and state finances were widely criticised. Despite remaining a significant figure for New Democracy after the party's defeat in the 2009 elections, his tenure is assessed unfavourably by academics and the general public. He is often considered one of the worst prime ministers in modern Greek history.

== Political career ==
Kostas Karamanlis, a nephew of former Greek President Konstantinos Karamanlis, was born in Athens and studied at University of Athens Law School and at the private Deree College, continuing with postgraduate studies in the Fletcher School of Law and Diplomacy at Tufts University (Boston) in the United States, where he gained a master's degree and a doctorate in political sciences, international relations and diplomatic history.

Karamanlis served in New Democracy's organisational and ideological sectors from 1974 to 1979 and from 1984 to 1989. He is the author of a book, Eleftherios Venizelos and Foreign Relations of Greece, 1928–32, on the Greek politician Eleftherios Venizelos. He has also edited and prefaced various historical publications.

Karamanlis was elected a New Democracy deputy for Thessaloniki in 1989, but in 2004 he was elected for Larissa. He was elected party leader in 1997 following New Democracy's defeat in the 1996 election. He defeated the ruling Panhellenic Socialist Movement (PASOK) at the 2004 elections.

He served as one of the Vice Presidents of the European People's Party (EPP) between 1999 and 2006.

Karamanlis was the first Greek Prime Minister to be born after World War II. He married Natasa Pazaïti in 1998 having two children born on 13 June 2003.

=== Prime Minister (2004–2009) ===
Aided by the unpopularity of the incumbent PASOK government led by Costas Simitis (a party that had been in power between 1981 and 1989 and from 1993 to 2004) ND defeated the Socialists' George Andreas Papandreou in 2004.

Karamanlis stated that the priorities of his government were education, economic policy, agricultural policy, lowering the high level of unemployment (standing at 11.2%) and a more transparent and effective state administration. Economic policy centered on tax cuts, investment incentives, privatization, and market deregulation. While early problems included a large public debt (about 112% of GDP) and a budget deficit (5.3% of the GDP) in excess of Eurozone stability rules, Karamanlis's government halved the budget deficit to 2.6% by 2006.

Another key issue was the 2004 Summer Olympics scheduled to be held in Athens in the first year of his government: several key buildings were unfinished at the time of the election, the security budget had increased to €970 million and authorities announced that a roof would no longer be constructed over the main swimming venue. The main Olympic Stadium, the designated facility for the opening and closing ceremonies, was completed only two months before the games opened, with the sliding over of a futuristic glass roof designed by Spanish architect Santiago Calatrava. Other facilities, such as the streetcar line linking the city and the airport were largely unfinished just two months before the games. The subsequent pace of preparation, however, made the rush to finish the Athens venues one of the tightest in Olympics history and everything was finished just in time for the Opening Ceremony. At the end, the Games were held exactly as planned and were globally hailed as a spectacular success. Nonetheless and as a result of the delays, large cost overruns resulted in a deficit in the national accounts above EU stipulations. The ND government and the previous government of Costas Simitis criticized each other for the messy preparations. PASOK criticized the New Democracy government for using the Olympics as a pretext to renege on promises. Under the weight of the huge costs (estimated at €7bn), the deficit shot up to 5.3%. Karamanlis declared that "Social policy was done with borrowed cash, military spending did not show up on the budget, debts were created in secret".

==== Financial audit of 2004 ====
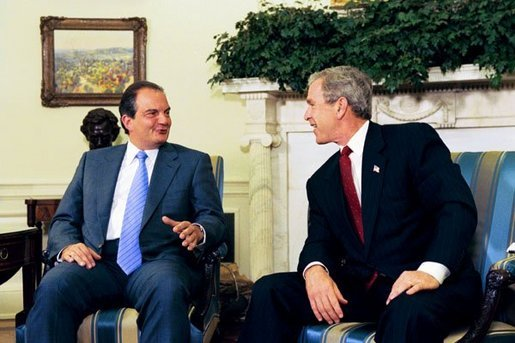
Karamanlis with George W. Bush in the White House, 2004.

Karamanlis with Sali Berisha and Nicos Anastasiades, 2005.

In March 2004, while PASOK was still in government, Eurostat refused to validate the fiscal data transmitted by the Greek government and asked for a revision, as it had done previously twice in 2002, resulting in a revision which changed the government balance from a surplus to a deficit.

A worse blow came in May 2004, when the European Commission harshly accused Greece of "imprudent" and "sloppy" fiscal policies, pointing out that since Greek economic growth had been an annual 4% in 2000–2003, a declining fiscal position could only be the result of government mismanagement, including concerns by the EU regarding the 103% public debt to GDP ratio which Karamanlis had inherited from the previous PASOK regime. With this report, the Commission effectively called into question the quality of Greek economic data, as Eurostat had done in March.

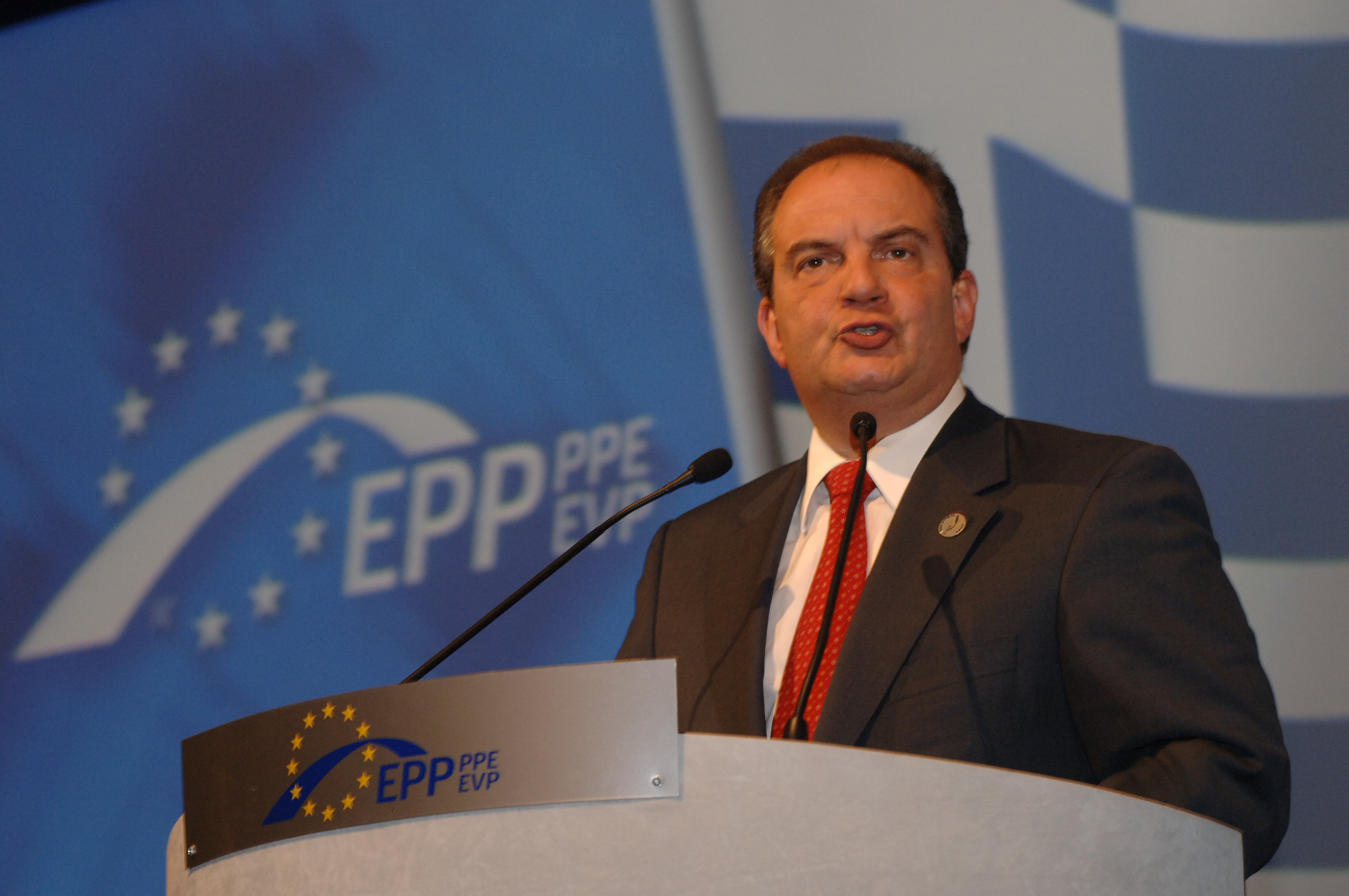
Karamanlis in Rome, 2006.

Karamanlis with Michel Barnier, 2007.

The New Democracy government under Karamanlis, elected on April of that year, decided to conduct a Financial Audit of the Greek economy, before sending revised data to Eurostat. The audit concluded that the PASOK administration and prime minister Costas Simitis had falsified Greece's macroeconomic statistics, on the basis of which the European institutions accepted Greece to join the Eurozone. PASOK contested the accusations and claimed that 2006 Eurostat changes to the system of defense expenditure calculation legitimized the practices of the Costas Simitis government. New Democracy responded that the defense expenditures covered by those changes constituted only a small part of much more substantial expenditures that were fraudulently concealed by the previous PASOK government.

In social policy, the retirement age was raised from 58 to 60 for those with 35 years of insurance, while early retirement went up from 55 to 60 for those who entered the labor market after 1993. Supplementary pensions were also cut. In addition, mothers with under-aged children could retire at 55 instead of 50, while paid maternity leave was extended to 6 months in the private sector.

Rising unemployment and the threat of inflation undermined Karamanlis's promises to kick-start the economy and sparked strikes, especially one in 2006 by rubbish collectors, causing severe disruption in the economy – particularly the one in July 2005 at the height of the tourist season.

Karamanlis with Vladimir Putin in Kremlin, 2008.

In early 2006, it was revealed that the cellular phone of Kostas Karamanlis, as well as those of several other members of the government and officials of the armed forces, had been wiretapped for several months during and after the 2004 Athens Olympics. The investigation into this matter by the Greek organization for communications privacy was closed with the argument that if this investigation would carry on, the information revealed would be dangerous for the national security of Greece.

The government has undertaken a €210 million program to bolster broadband internet connectivity in provincial Greece, which was approved by the European Commission in 2006 with the commendation that it constituted "the most ambitious broadband development programme that any EU member has ever undertaken".

In matters of social policy, Karamanlis's government has followed a largely liberal policy. In the spring of 2006, the Ministry of Education repealed a law continuously in effect from 1936 (including 20 years of socialist rule), which required approval by the local Orthodox Christian Metropolitan for the building of non-Orthodox houses of worship.

At the outset of the year, prime minister Karamanlis announced the initiative of his government for a new amendment to the Constitution. He stated that one of the central issues of this amendment will be the legalisation of private universities in Greece, operating on a non-profit basis. Greece has for years experienced a mass exodus of "educational immigrants" to other countries' Higher Education institutions, where they move to study; this creates a chronic problem for Greece, in terms of loss of capital as well as human resources, since many of those students opt to seek employment in the countries they studied, after getting their degrees (it is characteristic Greece is by far the leading country in the world in terms of students abroad as a percentage of the general population, with 5250 students per million, compared to second Malaysia's 1780 students per million inhabitants). Proponents of non-state owned Universities claim that the State's constitutionally mandated monopoly on Higher Education is responsible for these problems.

Attempted changes in Greek higher education have encountered fierce opposition from the other parties, as well as from the majority of the academic community, both professors and students. An attempt to pass several changes concerning the operation of Greek universities resulted in large-scale demonstrations, bringing together tens of thousands of protesters, and, finally, the closure of most institutions by protesting students in the summer of 2006. The semester's exam period was lost and postponed until the fall, while the government shelved the changes and claimed that no bill would be put to a parliamentary vote before a more extensive dialogue had been held with students. However, without any further dialogue, the legislation was passed in 2007.

==== 2007 legislative election ====
Karamanlis with Angela Merkel in Warsaw, 2009.

In the 2007 general election, Karamanlis was re-elected with a diminished majority, following the 2007 Greek forest fires that ravaged much of western Peloponnese and southern Euboea. He pledged to continue with his reform and privatization programme as well as to form a new Cabinet.

On 19 September 2007, he presented a new cabinet.

==== 2009 legislative election ====
In the 2009 general election, Karamanlis and New Democracy were voted out of the government. He stepped down on 30 November after elections within the New Democracy party for the election of new party leader.

== Criticism ==
The prime minister came under criticism during the wildfires of 2007. With hundreds of thousands of acres burning and many deaths, the government had faced growing scrutiny for its response to the fires. In the days following the fires and the seeming lack of a substantial fire-fighting response adequate to stop the blazes, the government suggested the process was not natural and the work of arsonists.

A group of Pakistani men has claimed that they were abducted by Greek and British intelligence agents in the wake of the 7 July 2005 London bombings. The governments of Greece, Pakistan, and Britain have denied accusations that they were involved in the alleged detention of 28 Pakistanis for several days in Athens and Ioannina after the 7 July bombings in London. The prosecutor assigned to the case said he had no evidence of who committed the abductions, but the main opposition party PASOK called for the resignation of Greek public order minister Georgios Voulgarakis. An unnamed human rights group (possibly biased) also called for the resignation of the Prime Minister, Kostas Karamanlis over the allegations.

A number of serious scandals involving Karamanlis's closest ministers and members of his party surfaced during his term, damaging his public image severely. Karamanlis was largely elected in 2004 due to his plea to "clear" public life from corruption.

Another criticism against Karamanlis and his cabinet involved the 2008 riots, which started after the killing of 15-year-old Alexandros Grigoropoulos by a police officer. Police said Grigoropoulos was in a group of four teenagers who used hard language to a few policemen by a car. One officer was charged, and Reuters noted that "Greece has a tradition of violence at student rallies and fire bomb attacks by anarchist groups." Amnesty International called for a speedy investigation. The death of Grigoropoulos resulted in large demonstrations and widespread riots in major Greek and foreign cities.

After he left office, many in Greece continued to blame the New Democracy governments of Karamanlis for economic difficulties. Financial markets and Greece's EU partners chastised the country for vastly underestimated budget deficits under his watch.

== See also ==
- Cabinet of Greece

Party political offices
Preceded by Miltiadis Evert	Leader of New Democracy; 1997–2009	Succeeded by Antonis Samaras
Political offices
Preceded by Miltiadis Evert	Leader of the Opposition; 1997–2004	Succeeded by George Papandreou
Preceded by Costas Simitis	Prime Minister of Greece; 2004–2009	Succeeded by George Papandreou
Preceded by Evangelos Venizelos	Minister for Culture; 2004–2006	Succeeded by Georgios Voulgarakis
Preceded by George Papandreou	Leader of the Opposition; 2009	Succeeded by Antonis Samaras
Order of precedence
Preceded by Afroditi Latinopoulou as President of Voice of Reason	Order of precedence of Greece; Former Prime Minister	Succeeded by George Papandreou as former Prime Minister
