= 2007 Greek parliamentary election =

- 16 September 2007

All 300 seats in the Hellenic Parliament 151 seats needed for a majority

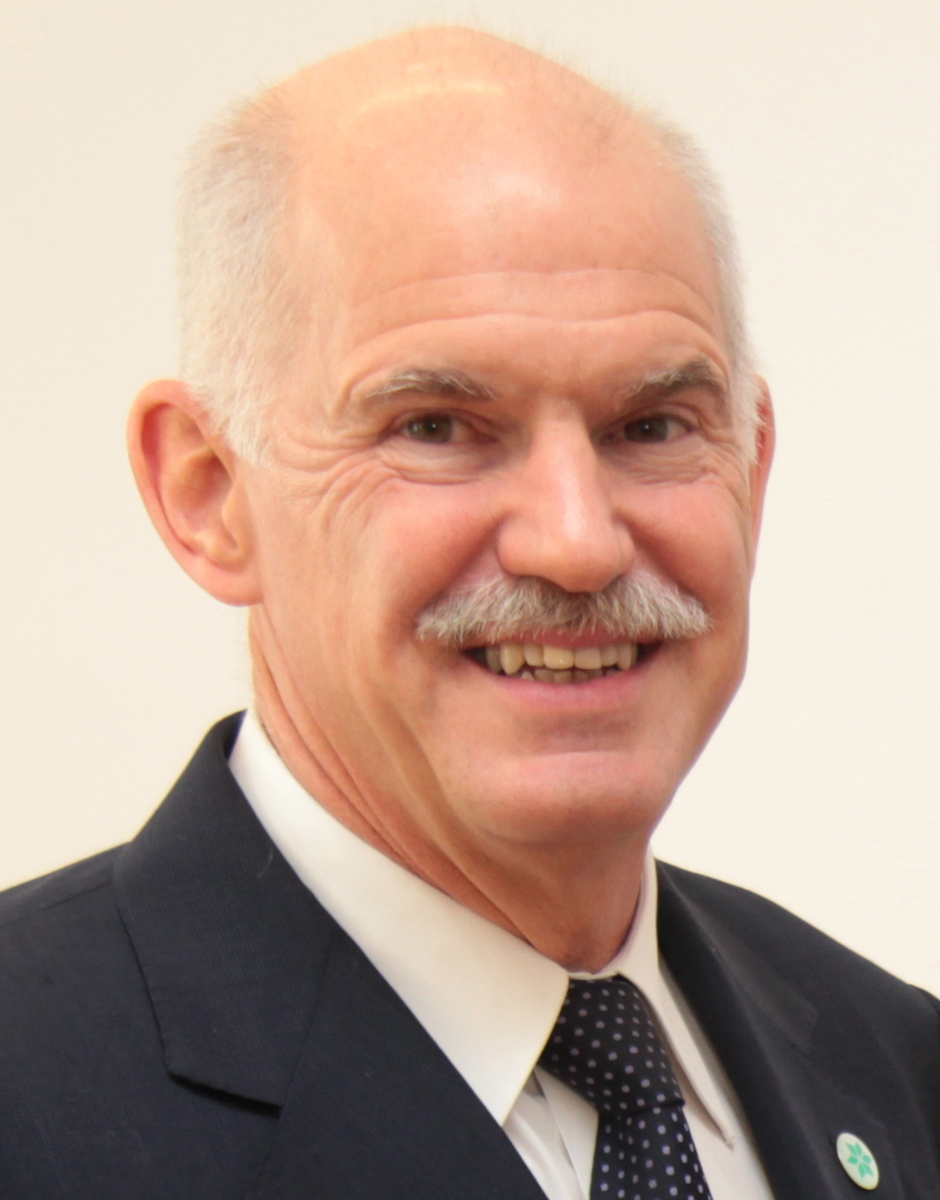

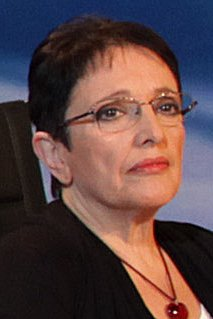

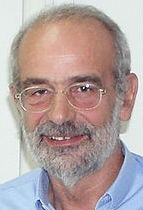

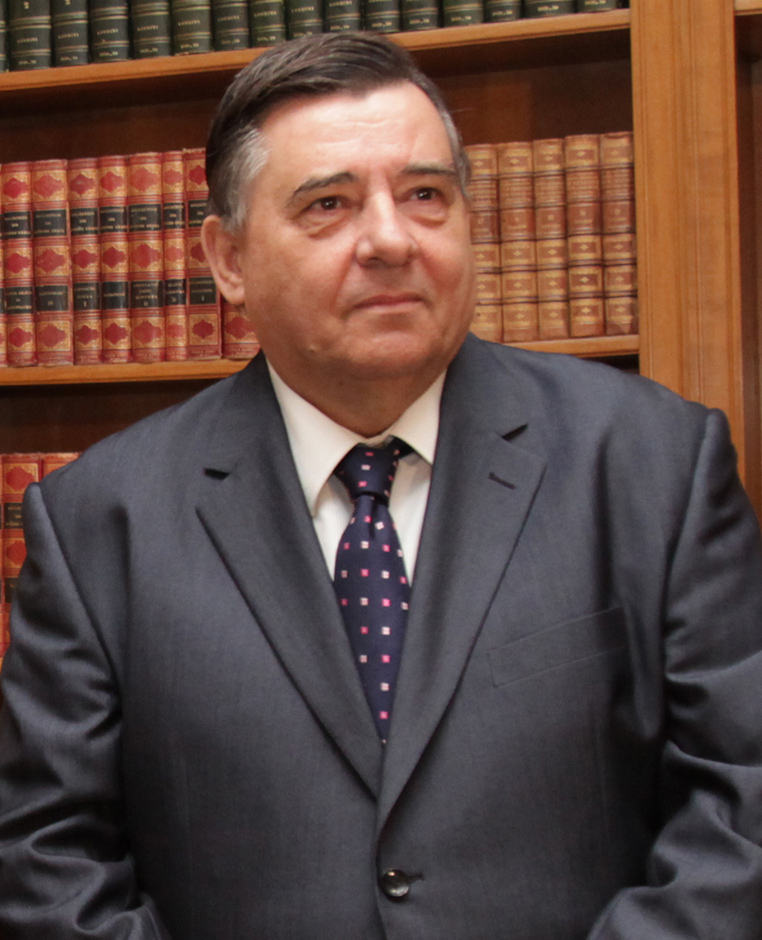
	First party	Second party	Third party
Leader	Kostas Karamanlis	George Papandreou	Aleka Papariga
Party	ND	PASOK	KKE
Last election	45.36%, 165 seats	40.55%, 117 seats	5.90%, 12 seats
Seats won	152	102	22
Seat change	▼13	▼15	▲10
Popular vote	2,994,979	2,727,279	583,815
Percentage	41.84%	38.10%	8.15%
Swing	▼3.52pp	▼2.45pp	▲2.25pp
	Fourth party	Fifth party
Leader	Alekos Alavanos	Georgios Karatzaferis
Party	Syriza	LAOS
Last election	3.26%, 6 seats	2.19%, 0 seats
Seats won	14	10
Seat change	▲8	▲10
Popular vote	361,211	271,764
Percentage	5.04%	3.80%
Swing	▲1.77pp	▲1.61pp
- Results by constituency
Prime Minister before election
Kostas Karamanlis
ND
Prime Minister after election
Kostas Karamanlis
ND

Parliamentary elections were held in Greece on Sunday, 16 September 2007 to elect the 300 members of the Hellenic Parliament. The leading party for a second term was New Democracy under the leadership of Kostas Karamanlis with 42%, followed by George Papandreou and PASOK with 38%. New Democracy managed to secure an absolute but narrow majority of 152 out of 300 seats in parliament. The populist Popular Orthodox Rally entered the parliament for the first time with 10 seats, while the parties of the left, the Communist Party of Greece (KKE) and Syriza, enjoyed a significant increase in their vote share. KKE received 8% of the votes (up from 6%) and won 22 seats (from 12), while Syriza received 5% of the votes (up 2 pp) and 14 seats.

The difference of nearly four percentage points between the first two parties resulted in George Papandreou announcing that he would seek reaffirmation of his party leadership, with Evangelos Venizelos and Kostas Skandalidis also declaring candidacy for the post.

== Background ==
- August 22, 2007: The Democratic Social Movement (DIKKI) (6th largest party in the previous elections) announced its electoral alliance with the Coalition of the Radical Left (SYRIZA).
- August 29, 2007: Opinion pollers MRB came under criticism from PASOK. Mathematical inconsistencies were alleged, such as response tallies summing up to more than 100%. MRB denied the allegations. MRB's parent company, Spot-Thompson Greece, are New Democracy's advertisers.
- August 30, 2007: MRB came under more fire as it cancelled publication of its regular biannual "Trends" survey, citing extreme difficulty in obtaining accurate information in the fire-stricken areas. Critics said that this admission automatically rendered previous voting behavior MRB estimates from these areas unreliable; yet, the election results in the prefectures which were devastated by the fires (Ilia, Euboea and Arcadia), were marked by a loss in votes for both the main opposition party and the ruling party.
- September 1, 2007: The Areios Pagos refused to certify Fofi Gennimata as a candidate for the PASOK nationwide list, citing non-eligibility because Mrs. Gennimata is elected the superprefect of Athens and Piraeus. This was criticised angrily by PASOK as an attempt to politicise the courts.
- September 2, 2007: The Areios Pagos:
  - refused to include the title of DIKKI in the electoral alliance of SYRIZA claiming that the internal procedures followed by DIKKI were flawed. This was criticised furiously by SYRIZA and DIKKI as inappropriate interference in party political activity on behalf of the courts.
  - refused to allow the New Fascism (Greek: Νέος Φασισμός) party contest the election because of its provocative name.
  - refused to allow the New Salvation Party – Christian Democracy to use the Cross as its logo on the grounds that it is a religious symbol.
  - excluded seven other parties from the elections for failure to pay the required electoral deposit.
- September 6, 2007: NET state television, in simulcast with the major private TV stations, broadcast the debate among the leaders of ND, PASOK, Communist Party of Greece (KKE), SYRIZA, Popular Orthodox Rally (LAOS), and Democratic Revival, who were questioned by six reporters in six rounds of questions and follow-ups. Questions and responses were rotated and timed. The debate lasted approximately 2.5 hours and concluded with a two-minute speech by each leader. The debate format, agreed beforehand by the participating parties, met with criticism for being too rigid and formal, too protective of the politicians and not conducive to exhaustive scrutiny of their policies.

== Electoral system ==
There were concerns that the election could return a hung parliament, mainly due to the recently revised Greek electoral law. Although it preserved the 3% threshold necessary for a party to enter parliament, it decreased the number of seats automatically awarded to the leading party. Parliamentary majority was considered more difficult, especially after the early projection that five parties would cross this threshold for the first time after the metapolitefsi.

According to the electoral law, the first-past-the post party was automatically awarded a bonus of 40 parliamentary seats. The remaining 260 seats were divided among all parties that achieved a minimum 3% nationwide vote tally, strictly in proportion to their polling returns. Since a majority of 151 seats was required, the leading party should secure at least 111 seats (42.7% of 260) in order to be able to form a government. Karamanlis had stated that in the event that no party should manage to achieve a majority, he would seek a new election. Papandreou had vaguely indicated that he may have pursued an alliance with the left, however the SYRIZA and KKE parties had categorically dismissed any possibility of participating in a coalition with any of the major parties.

No opinion polls were allowed to be published after September 1. The polls publicized prior to the election had concluded that:

- The next Parliament would be a five-party Parliament.
- New Democracy would hold a smaller lead over PASOK at around 2%.
- The goal of a workable parliamentary majority hung in the brink, with some pollsters projecting 147–149 and some 151–153 seats for the leading party.

The law traditionally requires that voting begins at "sunrise" and ends at "sunset". In practice this is rounded up to the nearest top of the hour. Voting began at 7 am and concluded at 7 pm. 7 pm was also the time when media outlets publicized their exit polls and issued their predictions. According to SingularLogic, the information technology contractor of the Ministry of the Interior, initial returns would not reach statistical significance before 11 pm and firm estimates might not emerge until after midnight. Voting took place in 20,623 polling stations – mostly schools – throughout the country, each of which catered to 400–500 voters on average.

== Opinion polls ==
A collection of opinion polls taken before the elections is listed below. According to a law, which was voted by the Greek parliament, publication of opinion polls is forbidden in the fortnight prior to the election date. Therefore, the last day when opinion polls were published was September 1, 2007, and practically all opinion polling firms published their final public reports on August 31, 2007, in time for the evening news.

Pollster	Date published	ND	PASOK	KKE	Syriza (Note: Most of the earlier polls refer to Synaspismos, part of the Syriza coalition.)	LAOS	Other	None	Unsure
Public Issue/VPRC	14 January 2007	43.0	39.0	7.5	4.0	3.5	3.0		
GPO	15 January 2007	35.9	33.7	7.3	4.1	4.4	0.7	4.4	9.3
Kapa Research	10 February 2007	37.5	35.9	7.4	3.6	3.2			12.4
Public Issue/VPRC	11 February 2007	43.0	39.5	7.5	4.0	3.5	2.5		
RASS	25 February 2007	36.7	33.9	5.8	2.8	2.7			18.1
Public Issue/VPRC	11 March 2007	43.0	39.5	7.0	4.5	3.5	2.5		
Metron Analysis	22 March 2007	37.1	35.9	7.0	3.1	3.6			13.3
ALCO	30 March 2007	33.9	33.4	5.5	2.8	2.2			22.2
Kapa Research	30 March 2007	36.9	35.9	7.0	3.4	3.9			12.9
GPO	2 April 2007	36.0	34.2	7.0	4.0	4.5	0.9	3.9	9.5
Public Issue/VPRC	13 April 2007	42.5	39.0	7.0	4.5	4.0	3.0		
MRB	27 April 2007	35.9	33.5	6.7	4.1	3.7			16.1
Public Issue/VPRC	13 May 2007	42.5	39.5	6.5	5.0	3.5	3.0		
MRB	24 May 2007	35.7	33.7	6.3	4.4	4.7			15.2
Metron Analysis	2 June 2007	33.4	32.0	6.8	3.6	4.4			19.8
Public Issue/VPRC	8 June 2007	43.0	39.0	7.0	4.5	4.0	2.5		
GPO	4 June 2007	35.5	34.5	7.1	4.4	4.9	2.3	3.3	8.0
ALCO	15 June 2007	34.2	34.0	6.3	2.9	3.5	1.6	2.5	14.7
MRB	15 June 2007	36.3	34.0	7.0	4.4	3.7			14.6
Metron Analysis	21 June 2007	36.8	35.8	6.4	3.8	3.8			13.4
Kapa Research	30 June 2007	36.1	35.1	7.6	4.3	4.2	0.6		12.1
Public Issue/VPRC	16 July 2007	42.5	38.5	7.5	4.5	3.5	3.5		
GPO	22 August 2007	36.2	34.6	7.1	4.2	4.6		5.8	7.5
Metron Analysis	22 August 2007	31.0	29.5	7.0	4.3	3.5	2.5	6.8	15.4
MRB	23 August 2007	36.8	34.8	6.8	4.5	4.0	1.3	2.8	9.0
Kapa Research	26 August 2007	34.9	33.6	7.2	4.9	4.1	1,6		13.7
ALCO	27 August 2007	35.0	34.2	6.5	3.4	3.6	0.8	4.1	11.8
MRB	28 August 2007	35.2	33.2	7.3	4.4	3.9	2.2	4.3	6.7
Metron Analysis	29 August 2007	29.7	28.1	8.1	4.7	3.6	2.6	10.5	17.4
GPO	29 August 2007	36.0	34.8	7.0	4.5	4.9	2.1		10.7
ALCO	29 August 2007	31.6	30.9	6.2	3.4	3.3	1.8	8.7	15.9
Public Issue/VPRC (vote projection) (Note: Public Issue/VPRC noted that their report was a prediction based on the time-series of opinion polls they had conducted.)	31 August 2007	42.0	38.0	8.5	5.0	4.0	2.5		
MRB	31 August 2007	35.4	33.3	7.5	4.7	3.7			
GPO	31 August 2007	37.4	36.0	7.6	4.2	4.7			
ALCO	31 August 2007	31.5	30.8	6.5	3.7	3.6			

=== Exit polls ===
The Greek media outlets issued their exit polls at 19:00 local time.

Media outlet	Polling Firm	ND	PASOK	KKE	SYRIZA	LAOS	Others/ blank/ invalid
ERT	Rass	42.2%	38.5%	7.5%	5.0%	3.5%	3.3%
ANT1 (Note: Revised exit poll presented at 20:30)	Metron Analysis	40.4–42.8%	36.8–39.2%	7.4–8.8%	4.8–6.0%	3.2–4.2%	2.8–3.6%
Alpha	MRB	40.8–42.8%	37.5–39.5%	7.5–8.5%	4.5–6.0%	3.5–4.5%	2.0–3.5%
Alter	ALCO	40.6–42.6%	37.8–39.8%	6.4- 8%	4.6–5.8%	3.5–4.5%	2–3.5%
Mega	GPO	41–43%	37.5–39.5%	7.5–9%	4.5–6%	3.5-4%	2.5-3%
Skai	V-PRC	41–43%	36–38%	7.5–9.5%	5–6%	3.5–4.5%	2.5–3.5%
Star	Kapa Research	41.9%	38.4%	7.7%	5.3%	4.0%	2.7%
Average:		41.9%	38.2%	7.9%	5.3%	3.8%	3.0%
Mega (Note: Statistical projection based on official returns, presented at 21:30 local time – claimed margin of error: 0.2%)	GPO	42.0% 153 seats	37.8% 101 seats	8.2% 22 seats	5.0% 13 seats	4.0% 11 seats	3.0% -

== Results ==
Party	Votes	%	Seats	+/–
New Democracy	2,994,979	41.84	152	–13
PASOK	2,727,279	38.10	102	–15
Communist Party of Greece	583,750	8.15	22	+10
Syriza	361,101	5.04	14	+8
Popular Orthodox Rally	271,809	3.80	10	+10
Ecologist Greens	75,502	1.05	0	New
Democratic Revival	57,167	0.80	0	New
Union of Centrists	20,840	0.29	0	0
Communist Party of Greece (Marxist–Leninist)	17,555	0.25	0	0
Radical Left Front	11,843	0.17	0	0
United Anti-Capitalist Left	10,604	0.15	0	0
Marxist–Leninist Communist Party of Greece	8,137	0.11	0	0
Liberal Alliance	7,498	0.10	0	New
Liberal Party	3,099	0.04	0	0
Organization for the Reconstruction of the KKE	2,473	0.03	0	0
Fighting Socialist Party of Greece	2,109	0.03	0	0
Greek Ecologists	1,740	0.02	0	New
Light – Truth – Justice	970	0.01	0	New
Democratic Universal Hellas	10	0.00	0	New
Regional Urban Development	5	0.00	0	New
Independents	536	0.01	0	0
Total	7,159,006	100.00	300	0
Valid votes	7,159,006	97.33		
Invalid/blank votes	196,020	2.67		
Total votes	7,355,026	100.00		
Registered voters/turnout	9,918,917	74.15		
Source: Ministry of the Interior

=== By region ===
Region	ND (%)	PASOK (%)	KKE (%)	SYRIZA (%)	LAOS (%)
Achaea	36.86	45.97	7.16	4.91	2.47
Aetolia-Akarnania	43.56	43.70	6.25	2.86	1.99
Argolida	48.90	37.44	4.83	3.53	3.14
Arkadia	46.65	38.67	5.36	4.03	3.15
Arta	47.34	38.71	6.69	3.94	1.60
Athens A	40.16	29.96	10.52	9.27	5.39
Athens B	35.27	34.05	12.11	8.94	5.04
Attica	39.25	36.27	9.24	5.80	5.82
Boeotia	40.98	40.45	7.92	4.40	3.54
Cephalonia	39.29	37.15	13.15	3.89	3.12
Chalkidiki	46.37	38.11	5.43	3.81	3.42
Chania	38.47	44.71	6.25	4.97	2.56
Chios	43.82	41.72	5.90	4.49	1.70
Corfu	40.06	36.44	14.89	4.04	2.08
Corinthia	43.55	41.51	4.37	4.18	3.58
Dodecanese	41.68	46.73	4.20	3.04	2.84
Drama	48.74	37.26	4.41	3.18	4.03
Elis	42.05	46.54	4.70	3.02	1.99
Euboea	40.61	42.02	7.22	4.28	3.35
Evros	48.05	39.76	4.33	2.27	3.39
Evrytania	44.61	45.64	3.35	2.40	2.22
Florina	48.17	39.26	5.28	2.89	2.55
Grevena	45.48	39.72	7.55	2.48	2.63
Imathia	42.83	39.04	7.58	3.15	4.64
Ioannina	43.38	38.78	7.99	4.69	2.42
Heraklion	33.54	54.63	4.40	4.35	1.33
Karditsa	48.02	37.81	7.41	2.86	2.14
Kastoria	54.32	32.44	4.09	3.75	3.32
Kavala	45.26	39.43	6.26	3.47	3.27
Kilkis	46.87	36.99	7.27	2.37	4.33
Kozani	46.66	39.78	5.64	3.00	2.12
Laconia	55.51	31.63	4.85	3.05	3.17
Larissa	43.46	36.82	10.06	3.85	3.53
Lasithi	36.70	52.71	3.49	4.19	1.09
Lefkada	42.52	37.59	10.74	5.17	1.64
Lemnos	39.42	37.68	13.99	3.97	2.48
Magnesia	43.32	36.39	9.36	4.31	3.63
Messenia	52.29	32.16	6.18	4.63	2.82
Naxos	45.50	37.87	5.58	5.31	2.77
Pella	47.35	39.31	4.59	2.32	4.26
Phocis	47.99	34.68	7.03	3.77	3.70
Phthiotis	49.58	36.67	5.22	3.22	3.40
Pieria	48.59	37.66	5.35	2.76	3.63
Piraeus A	42.34	32.57	8.95	6.76	5.24
Piraeus B	31.40	37.93	14.55	6.41	5.52
Preveza	45.98	38.88	7.66	3.83	1.78
Rethymno	46.50	43.84	3.39	3.59	1.12
Rhodope	45.75	45.90	2.86	1.94	1.57
Samos	37.99	32.54	18.13	5.21	2.62
Serres	52.82	33.10	5.01	2.93	3.96
Thesprotia	45.86	42.49	4.39	3.11	2.12
Thessaloniki A	37.38	34.63	10.31	6.12	6.22
Thessaloniki B	44.82	33.77	8.14	4.14	5.35
Trikala	45.68	39.27	8.49	2.75	2.03
Xanthi	39.97	48.90	3.53	2.51	2.76
Zakynthos	38.10	42.34	10.51	4.39	2.18

== Aftermath ==
At 01:00 on 17 September 2007 PASOK leader George Papandreou conceded defeat and Prime Minister Kostas Karamanlis thanked the electorate for granting him and his party a renewed term in office. Papandreou also stated that he will seek his party's direct reaffirmation in his leadership, and Evangelos Venizelos, PASOK's informal #2, declared himself "present" in this process. Papandreou went on and retained his leadership.

== See also ==
- List of members of the Hellenic Parliament, 2007–2009
