= Minister for Industry, Energy and Technology (Greece) =

The Minister for Industry, Energy and Technology (Greek: Υπουργός Βιομηχανίας, Ενέργειας και Τεχνολογίας, romanized: Ypourgós Viomīchanías, Enérgeias kai Technologías) of Greece was the government minister responsible for the running of the Ministry for Industry, Energy and Technology.

The ministry started off as the Ministry for Industry, subsequently the Ministry for Industry and Energy. In 1982 it was split into the Ministry for Energy and Natural Resources and the Ministry for Research and Technology and in 1985 these two ministries merged again into the Ministry for Industry, Energy and Technology.

The ministry was merged into the Ministry of Development by the 1996 Panhellenic Socialist Movement (PASOK) administration.

== List of ministers ==
=== Industry (1974–1976) ===
| Name | Took office | Left office | Party |
|---|---|---|---|
| Charalampos Protopappas | July 26, 1974 | October 9, 1974 | New Democracy (Government of national unity) |
| Nikolaos Farmakidis | October 9, 1974 | November 21, 1974 | New Democracy (Government of national unity) |
| Konstantinos Konofagos | November 21, 1974 | November 28, 1977 | New Democracy |

=== Industry and energy (1977–1982) ===
| Name | Took office | Left office | Party |
|---|---|---|---|
| Miltiadis Evert | November 28, 1977 | May 10, 1980 | New Democracy |
| Stefanos Manos | May 10, 1980 | October 21, 1981 | New Democracy |
| Anastasios Peponis | October 21, 1981 | July 5, 1982 | Panhellenic Socialist Movement |

- On July 5, 1982, the Ministry for Industry and Energy was split into two new ministries, the Ministry for Energy and Natural Resources and the Ministry for Research and Technology.

=== Energy and natural resources (1982–1985) ===
| Name | Took office | Left office | Party |
|---|---|---|---|
| Evangelos Kouloumpis | July 5, 1982 | September 21, 1984 | Panhellenic Socialist Movement |
| Eleftherios Veryvakis | September 21, 1984 | July 26, 1985 | Panhellenic Socialist Movement |

=== Research and technology (1982–1985) ===
| Name | Took office | Left office | Party |
|---|---|---|---|
| Georgios Lianis | July 5, 1982 | June 5, 1985 | Panhellenic Socialist Movement |

- On July 26, 1985, the Ministry for Energy and Natural Resources and the Ministry for Research and Technology merged to form the Ministry for Industry, Energy and Technology.

=== Industry, energy and technology (1985–1996) ===
| Name | Took office | Left office | Party |
|---|---|---|---|
| Eleftherios Veryvakis | July 26, 1985 | April 25, 1986 | Panhellenic Socialist Movement |
| Markos Natsinas | April 25, 1986 | October 31, 1986 | Panhellenic Socialist Movement |
| Anastasios Peponis | October 31, 1986 | July 2, 1989 | Panhellenic Socialist Movement |
| Michail Papakonstantinou | July 2, 1989 | October 12, 1989 | New Democracy (Coalition government) |
| Pavlos Sakellarides | October 12, 1989 | November 23, 1989 | None (Caretaker government) |
| Anastasios Peponis | November 23, 1989 | February 13, 1990 | Panhellenic Socialist Movement (Government of national unity) |
| Pavlos Sakellarides | February 13, 1990 | April 11, 1990 | None (Caretaker government) |
| Stavros Dimas | April 11, 1990 | July 29, 1991 | New Democracy |
| Andreas Andrianopoulos | August 8, 1991 | August 7, 1992 | New Democracy |
| Ioannis Palaiokrassas | August 7, 1992 | December 3, 1992 | New Democracy |
| Vasileios Kontogiannopoulos | December 3, 1992 | October 13, 1993 | New Democracy |
| Kostas Simitis | October 13, 1993 | September 15, 1995 | Panhellenic Socialist Movement |
| Anastasios Peponis | September 15, 1995 | January 22, 1996 | Panhellenic Socialist Movement |
| Vasso Papandreou | January 22, 1996 | February 1, 1996 | Panhellenic Socialist Movement |

- From August 8, 1991 until September 15, 1995 the Minister for Industry, Energy and Technology was also Minister for Trade.
- From February 1, 1996, the Ministry for Industry, Energy and Technology was merged with the Ministry for Trade and the Ministry for Tourism to create the Ministry for Development.

== See also ==
- Cabinet of Greece
