= Ministry of Trade and Industry =

A ministry of trade and industry, ministry of commerce, ministry of commerce and industry or variations is a ministry that is concerned with a nation's trade, industry and commerce.

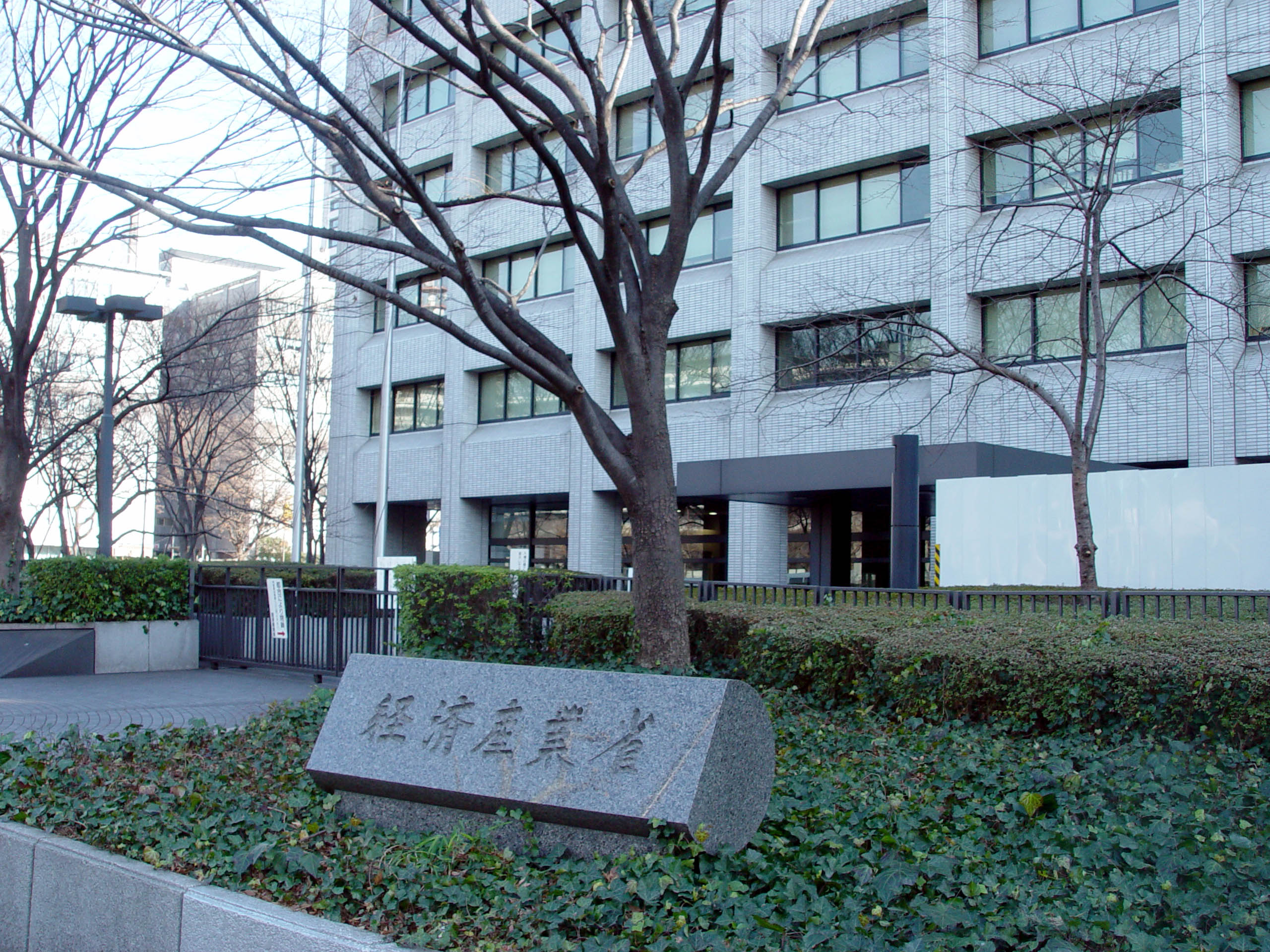
Ministry of Economy, Trade and Industry (Japan)

Notable examples are:

== List ==
- Algeria: Ministry of Industry and Mines
- Azerbaijan:
  - Ministry of Industry and Energy (Azerbaijan)
  - Ministry of Defence Industry of Azerbaijan
  - Ministry of Economic Development (Azerbaijan)
- Bangladesh: Ministry of Commerce (Bangladesh)
- Brazil: Ministry of Development, Industry, Trade and Services (Brazil)
- Brunei:
  - Ministry of Energy, Manpower and Industry
  - Ministry of Finance and Economy (Brunei)
  - Ministry of Primary Resources and Tourism
- Botswana:
  - Ministry of Trade and Industry (Botswana)
- Cambodia: Ministry of Industry, Mining and Energy (Cambodia)
- Canada:
  - Innovation, Science and Economic Development Canada
  - Manitoba
    - Ministry of Industry and Commerce (Manitoba)
    - Ministry of Industry, Trade and Tourism (Manitoba); defunct
    - Ministry of Industry, Trade and Technology (Manitoba); defunct
    - Ministry of Industry, Economic Development and Mines (Manitoba); defunct
  - Ontario:
  - Ministry of Industry, Trade and Technology (Ontario; defunct)
- China:
  - Ministry of Commerce (China)
  - Ministry of Industry and Information Technology
  - Ministry of Aerospace Industry (People's Republic of China; defunct)
- Colombia:
  - Ministry of Commerce, Industry and Tourism (Colombia)
  - Ministry of Foreign Trade (Colombia)
- Czech Republic: Ministry of Industry and Trade (Czech Republic)
- Denmark: Ministry of Trade and Industry (Denmark)
- Egypt:
  - Ministry of Industry, Trade and Small Industries
  - Ministry of Trade and Industry (Egypt)
- Finland: Ministry of Economic Affairs and Employment (Finland)
- France:
  - Ministry of Commerce (France)
  - Ministry of Economy, Finance and Industry (France)
- Ghana:
  - Ministry of Trade and Industry (Ghana)
- Greece: Ministry for Trade (Greece)
- Hong Kong: Trade and Industry Department
- Iceland:
  - Ministry of Industry, Energy and Tourism (Iceland)
  - Ministry of Trade (Iceland)
  - Ministry of Industry and Commerce (Iceland)
- India:
  - Ministry of Commerce and Industry (India)
  - Ministry of Heavy Industries
  - Ministry of Food Processing Industries
  - Ministry of Micro, Small and Medium Enterprises
- Indonesia:
  - Ministry of Trade (Indonesia)
  - Ministry of Industry (Indonesia)
- Iran:
  - Ministry of Commerce (Iran)
  - Ministry of Industries and Mines (Iran)
- Iraq:
  - Ministry of Industry (Iraq)
  - Ministry of Trade (Iraq)
- Israel: Ministry of Economy (Israel)
- Japan:
  - Ministry of International Trade and Industry (Japan; defunct)
  - Ministry of Economy, Trade and Industry (Japan)
    - Ministry of Economy, Trade and Industry
  - Ministry of Commerce and Industry
- Kuwait: Ministry of Commerce (Kuwait)
- Laos: Ministry of Industry and Commerce (Laos)
- Malaysia: Ministry of International Trade and Industry (Malaysia)
- Moldova: Ministry of Agriculture and Food Industry (Moldova)
- Myanmar: Ministry of Industry (Myanmar)
- Nepal: Ministry of Industry (Nepal)
- Nigeria: Nigerian Federal Ministry of Commerce
- North Korea:
  - Ministry of Commerce
  - Ministry of External Economic Relations
- Norway:
  - Ministry of Trade and Industry (Norway)
  - Ministry of Trade and Shipping (Norway)
- Peru: Ministry of Foreign Trade and Tourism (Peru)
- Philippines: Department of Trade and Industry (Philippines)
- Pakistan:
  - Ministry of Commerce (Pakistan)
  - Ministry of Industry (Pakistan)
- Puntland: Ministry of Commerce, Industry, and Investment (Puntland)
- Russia:
  - Ministry of Industry (Russia)
  - Ministry of Industry and Trade (Russia)
- Rwanda: Ministry of Trade and Industry (Rwanda)
- Saudi Arabia: Ministry of Commerce and Investment (Saudi Arabia)
- Serbia: Ministry of Internal and Foreign Trade (Serbia)
- Sierra Leone: Ministry of Trade and Industry (Sierra Leone)
- Singapore: Ministry of Energy, Trade and Industry
- South Africa: Department of Trade, Industry and Competition
- South Korea: Ministry of Trade, Industry and Resources
- Soviet Union:
  - Ministry of Construction of Heavy Industry (USSR; defunct)
  - Ministry of Foreign Trade (Soviet Union)
  - Ministry of Transport Machine-Building Industry (USSR; defunct)
  - Ministry of Shipbuilding Industry (USSR; defunct)
  - Ministry of Aviation Industry (Soviet Union); defunct
- Spain: Ministry of Industry (Spain)
- Sri Lanka: Ministry of Industry and Commerce (Sri Lanka)
- Sweden:
  - Ministry of Industry (Sweden)
  - Ministry of Commerce and Industry (Sweden)
- Switzerland: Federal Department of Economic Affairs, Education and Research
- Syria: Ministry of Industry (Syria)
- Tanzania: Ministry of Industry, Trade and Marketing, of Tanzania
- Thailand: Ministry of Industry (Thailand)
- Trinidad and Tobago: Ministry of Trade and Industry (Trinidad and Tobago)
- Turkey: Ministry of Industry and Commerce (Turkey)
- Uganda: Ministry of Trade, Tourism and Industry (Uganda)
- United Kingdom:
  - Department for Business and Trade
  - Department of Trade and Industry (Isle of Man)
- United States: United States Department of Commerce
- Vietnam:
  - Ministry of Industry and Trade (Vietnam)
  - Ministry of Industry (Vietnam) (defunct)
  - Ministry of Trade (Vietnam) (defunct)
- Zimbabwe: Ministry of Industry and Commerce (Zimbabwe)

== See also ==
- Trade minister
- Minister of industry
- Department of Commerce (disambiguation)
