= Minister (government) =

Politician who heads a ministry

A minister is a politician who heads a ministry, making and implementing decisions on policies in conjunction with the other ministers. In some jurisdictions the head of government is also a minister and is designated the 'prime minister', 'premier', 'chief minister', 'chancellor' or other title.

In Commonwealth realm jurisdictions which use the Westminster system of government—such as the United Kingdom and Australia—ministers are usually required to be members of one of the houses of Parliament or legislature—or to be appointed to one if not—and are usually from the political party that controls a majority in the lower house of the legislature. These ministers continue to represent their constituency in parliament while being part of the government. In other jurisdictions with strict separation of powers—such as Belgium, Mexico, Netherlands, (Note: Once a minister's position is vacant, the minister can be a member of parliament, in accordance with article 57 section 3 of the Dutch constitution.) Philippines, Slovenia, and Nigeria—the holder of a cabinet-level post or other government official is not permitted to be a member of the legislature and must resign if chosen.

Depending on the administrative arrangements in each jurisdiction, ministers are usually heads of a government department and members of the government's ministry, cabinet and perhaps of a committee of cabinet. Some ministers may be more senior than others, and some may hold the title 'assistant minister' or 'deputy minister'. Some jurisdictions, with a large number of ministers, may designate ministers to be either in the inner or outer ministry or cabinet.

In some jurisdictions—such as Hong Kong, Mexico, the Philippines, the United Kingdom, and the United States—holders of an equivalent cabinet-level post are called secretaries (e.g., the Home Secretary in the United Kingdom, Secretary of State in the United States). Some holders of a cabinet-level post may have another title, such as 'Attorney-General' or 'Postmaster-General'.

== Etymology ==
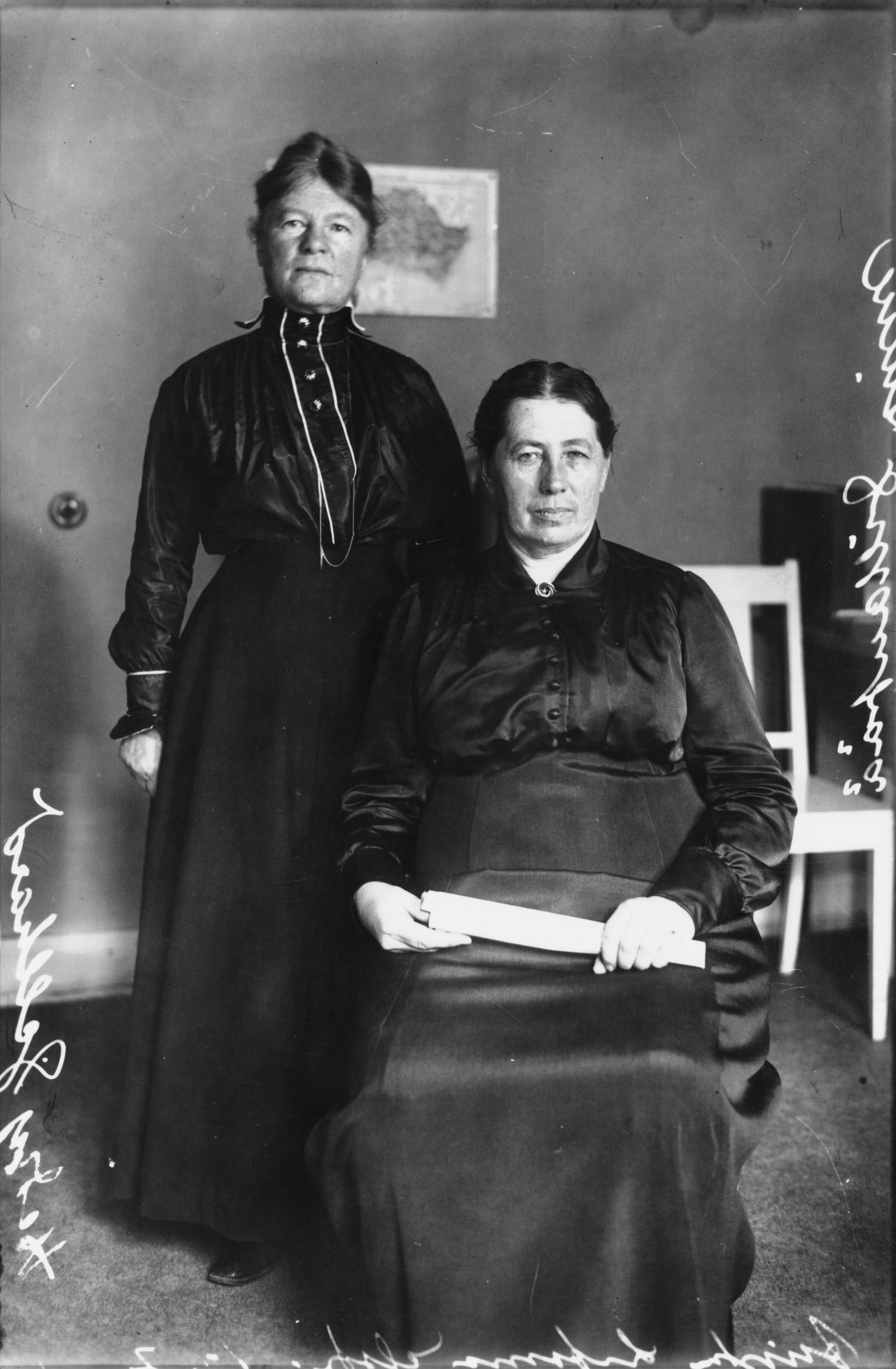
Finland's first female ministers were brought to Finnish Parliament shortly after the turn of the 20th century. From left to right: Hedvig Gebhard (1867–1961), member of parliament, and Miina Sillanpää (1866–1952), Minister of Social Affairs, in 1910.

The term 'minister' also is used in diplomacy, for a diplomat of the second class, such as in the title Minister Plenipotentiary, ranking between an Ambassador and a Minister Resident.

The term minister comes from Middle English, deriving from the Old French word ministre, originally minister in Latin, meaning "servant, attendant", which itself was derived from the word 'minus' meaning "less".

== Types of ministers and their name ==
Various countries form ministries as Cabinets (see List of cabinets). Other cabinets are usually included in Politics of ..-articles

- Lists of incumbents groups lists of ministers by country

Specific ministers include:

- Agriculture minister
- Commerce minister
- Communications minister
- Culture minister
- Defence minister
- Deputy prime minister
- Education minister
- Energy minister
- Environment minister
- Finance minister
- Foreign minister
- Housing minister
- Health minister
- Industry minister
- Interior minister
- Justice minister
- Labour minister
- Prime minister
- Public works minister
- Science minister
- Sports minister
- Tourism minister
- Transport minister

Some ministers may hold multiple portfolios and lead several ministries simultaneously, while multiple ministers with separate portfolios may oversee a single ministry, or may also share both ministerial and deputy-ministerial portfolios in different ministries. Some ministers may be more senior than others, and some may hold the title "assistant minister" or "deputy minister". Some jurisdictions, with a large number of ministers, may designate ministers to be either in the inner or outer ministry or cabinet. A cabinet minister can sometimes be in charge of no ministry at all, and is then known as a "minister without portfolio".

== See also ==
- Minister of the Crown
- Ministry (government department)
- Ministry (collective executive)
