= Ministry of Trade (Greece) =

- Υπουργείο Εμπορίου

Agency overview
- Dissolved: 1 February 1996
- Jurisdiction: Greece
- Headquarters: Athens

The Ministry of Trade (Greek: Υπουργείο Εμπορίου) was a government department of Greece. From August 8, 1991, until September 15, 1995, the Minister for Trade was also Minister for Industry, Energy and Technology. From February 1, 1996, the Ministry of Trade was officially merged with the Ministry for Industry, Energy and Technology and the Ministry for Tourism to create the Ministry for Development.

== List of ministers (1974–1995) ==
Name	Took office	Left office	Party
Athanasios Kanellopoulos	July 26, 1974	October 9, 1974	New Democracy (Government of national unity)
Constantinos Goustis	October 9, 1974	November 21, 1974	New Democracy (Government of national unity)
Ioannis Boutos	November 21, 1974	February 22, 1975	New Democracy
Ioannis Varvitsiotis	February 22, 1975	November 28, 1977	New Democracy
Georgios Panagiotopoulos	November 28, 1977	May 10, 1980	New Democracy
Stavros Dimas	May 10, 1980	October 11, 1980	New Democracy
Aristides Kalantzakos	October 11, 1980	October 21, 1981	New Democracy
Nikolaos Akritidis	October 21, 1981	July 5, 1982	Panhellenic Socialist Movement
Georgios Moraitis	July 5, 1982	February 8, 1984	Panhellenic Socialist Movement
Vasileios Kedikoglou	February 8, 1984	September 21, 1984	Panhellenic Socialist Movement
Nikolaos Akritidis	February 8, 1984	April 25, 1986	Panhellenic Socialist Movement
Georgios Katsifaras	April 25, 1986	October 31, 1986	Panhellenic Socialist Movement
Vasileios Sarantitis	October 31, 1986	February 5, 1987	Panhellenic Socialist Movement
Panagiotis Roumeliotis	February 5, 1987	November 27, 1987	Panhellenic Socialist Movement
Nikolaos Akritidis	November 27, 1987	March 17, 1989	Panhellenic Socialist Movement
Yiannos Papantoniou	March 17, 1989	July 2, 1989	Panhellenic Socialist Movement
Andreas Andrianopoulos	July 2, 1989	October 12, 1989	New Democracy
Theodoros Gamaletsos	October 12, 1989	November 23, 1989	None (Caretaker government)
Ioannis Varvitsiotis	November 23, 1989	February 13, 1990	New Democracy (Government of national unity)
Theodoros Gamaletsos	February 13, 1990	April 11, 1990	None (Government of national unity)
Athanasios Xarchas	April 11, 1990	August 8, 1991	New Democracy
Andreas Andrianopoulos	August 8, 1991	August 7, 1992	New Democracy
Ioannis Palaiokrassas	August 7, 1992	December 3, 1992	New Democracy
Vasileios Kontogiannopoulos	December 3, 1992	October 13, 1993	New Democracy
Kostas Simitis	October 13, 1993	September 15, 1995	Panhellenic Socialist Movement
Nikolaos Akritidis	September 15, 1995	January 22, 1996	Panhellenic Socialist Movement
Vasso Papandreou	January 22, 1996	February 1, 1996	Panhellenic Socialist Movement

== See also ==
- Cabinet of Greece
