= Amir Ali Sheibany =

Iranian businessman

Amir Ali Khan Sheibany

Under-Secretary Ministry of Industry and Mines
- In office October 1958 – March 1962
- Monarch: Mohammad-Reza Shah
- Preceded by: Habib Nafisy
- Succeeded by: Reza Niazmand

Civilian Adjutant
- In office 1971–1979

Founding Chairman ZobAhan
- In office October 1958 – 11 February 1979

Personal details
- Born: 7 March 1922 Birjand, Iran
- Died: December 2014 (aged 92) Iran, in exile
- Education: Tehran University, University of Oklahoma

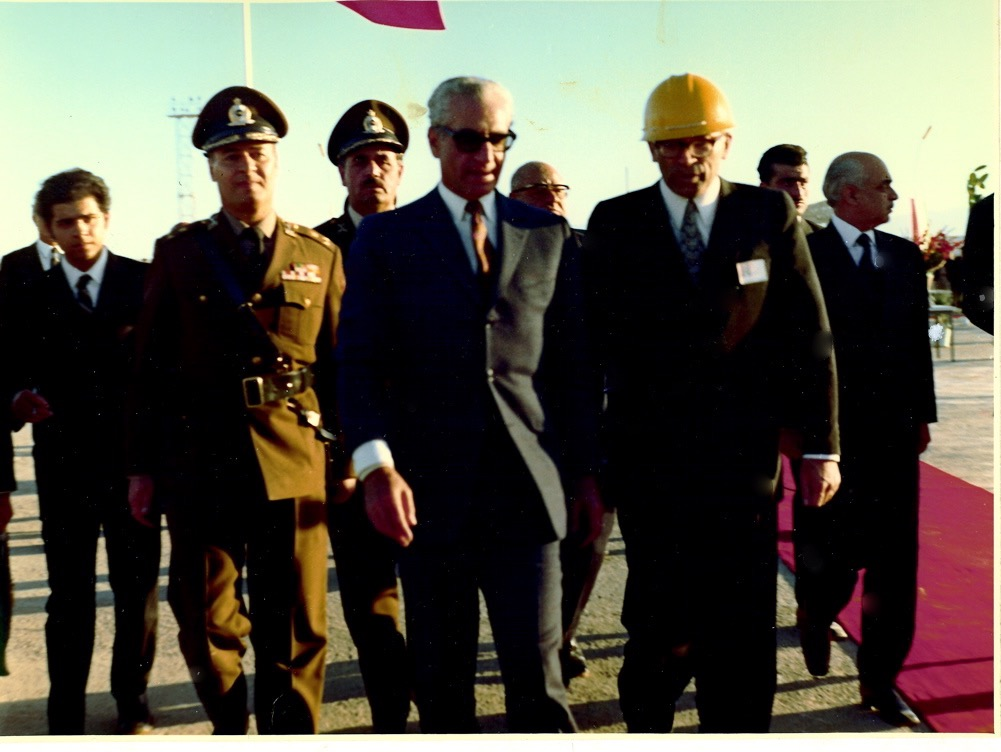
Amir Ali Sheibany with HIM Shahanshah AryaMehr

Amir Ali Khan Sheibany was the founding father of National Iranian Steel Co. (NISCO) He was born in Birjand, Iran in 1922 and died in exile on his 92nd birthday in 2014, and was buried in Iran.

== Early life ==
Born 2 weeks before Nowruz (the Persian New Year, usually the start of the spring solstice) of 1922 in Birjand, Khorasan to Hamideh Ghaffari and Amir Masoum Khan Sheibany, he was the 5th of 8 siblings. His father was the last trustee of the Mir Hassan Khan Trust, set up in the mid-eighteenth century. Amir Ali Sheibany was related to the mother of Prime Minister Asadollah Alam, and a direct descendant of Mir Mamad Khan, a storied commander of Nader Shah Afshar and governor of Khorasan. The title "Amir" (also transliterated "emir") is Arabic for ruler or governor. Amir Ali Khan Sheibany, was the 7th generation of Amir's based out of Khorasan.

== Education ==
Sheibany obtained a master's degree in mining engineering from Tehran University in 1945, a master's degree in civil engineering from the University of Oklahoma in 1957, and a Terminating Engineering Degree from Harvard University in 1958.

== Professional records with the Iranian Government ==
As the Undersecretary of State for the Ministry of Industry and Mines, which later became the Ministry of Economy, Amir Ali Khan Sheibany was instrumental in the rapid expansion of Iran's Industrial base, and was signatory to the building of 12,000 industrial units. He was also responsible for building eight cities for the steel industry workers, one of which, Aryashahr, was designed for up to 300 thousand residents. Built 25 km west of Isfahan, Aryashahr's master plan won in 1975 the award for the Best Designed Master Plan for a City in a competition in Brazil. With the help of Iranian city planners Amir Ali Sheibany presented to HIM the Shahanshah the master plan behind the Khorshid AryaMehr industrial zone of Isfahan (which houses a military industrial complex).

Prime Minister Amir-Abbas Hoveyda, once introduced Amir Ali Khan Sheibany to the US Ambassador to Tehran, as his “. . . roughest, toughest, shrewdest fighter. But I like him". The construction of the steel works was the end of a very long road of objections and obstacles by other industrialized countries, specifically Britain and the United States. Iran had to ultimately rely on Russian help for its completion. One Stanford-based researcher identified that declassified CIA reports had stated in 1966: "The shah often acted against US advice. … Iran’s decision to purchase a steel mill from Soviet Union… is one sign of this newfound independence. Iran’s active role in OPEC, and the Shah’s willingness to stand up to the west is another".

Marshall Plan Point 4, Public Health division Azerbaijan 1955–1956

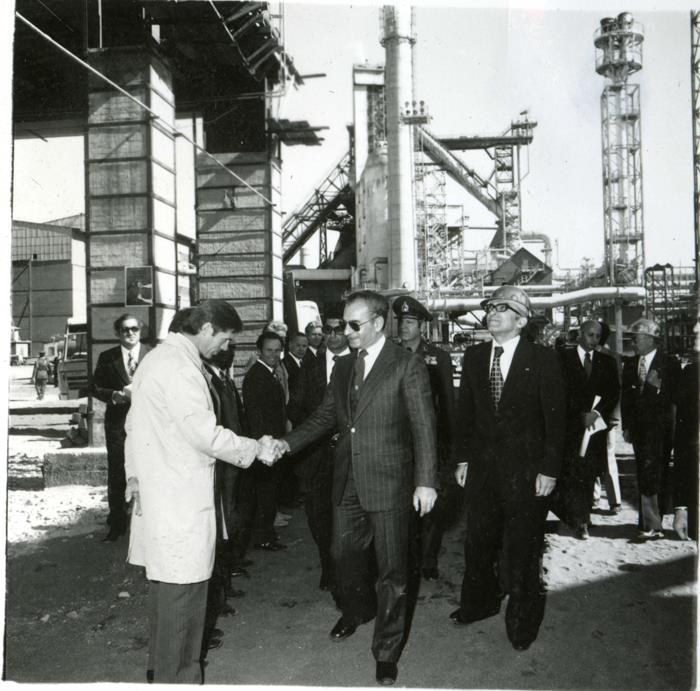
ZobAhan of Isfahan Inauguration

Associate Professor at Technical Faculty of Tehran University.

Consultant at Ministry of Industry and Mines.

Founder, and chairman of the Secretariat, of the legal structure pre-dating the Atomic Energy Organization of Iran, mandated by the 1957 bilateral nuclear cooperation agreement signed between the United States and Iran as part of the "Atoms for Peace" framework, making Iran a founding member in the International Atomic Energy Agency (IAEA)

Assistant General Managing Director of National Iranian Steel Corporation. (1st Cabinet of Mr. Jafar Sharif-Emami)

Undersecretary of Ministry of Industry and Mines. (Dr. Amini's Cabinet)

Undersecretary of Ministry of Economy. (Mr. A. Alam's Cabinet)

General Managing Director of National Iranian Steel Corporation. (Mr. A. Hoveyda's Cabinet until 1978)

Adjoudan-e Keshvari (Aide-du-Champ Civil de Sa Majeste Imperial le) Shahanshah Areyamehr.

== Decorations ==
First class medallion of Science of Ministry of Education

Grand Officier du L’Ordre Polaire granted by His Majesty the King of Sweden

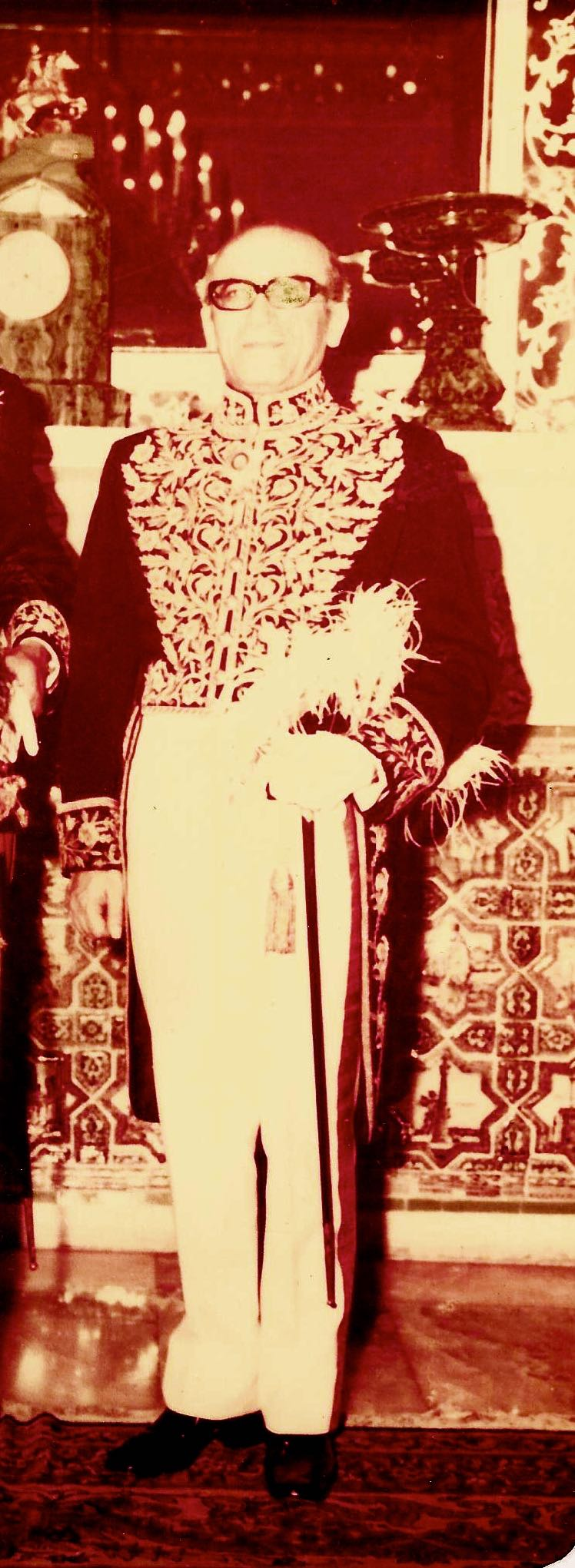
Salam

The Homayoon No.1 Decoration granted by His Imperial Majesty the Shahanshah of Iran
