= 1999 =

1999 in various calendars
- Gregorian calendar: 1999; MCMXCIX
- Ab urbe condita: 2752
- Armenian calendar: 1448; ԹՎ ՌՆԽԸ
- Assyrian calendar: 6749
- Baháʼí calendar: 155–156
- Balinese saka calendar: 1920–1921
- Bengali calendar: 1405–1406
- Berber calendar: 2949
- British Regnal year: 47 Eliz. 2 – 48 Eliz. 2
- Buddhist calendar: 2543
- Burmese calendar: 1361
- Byzantine calendar: 7507–7508
- Chinese calendar: 戊寅年 (Earth Tiger); 4696 or 4489 — to — 己卯年 (Earth Rabbit); 4697 or 4490
- Coptic calendar: 1715–1716
- Discordian calendar: 3165
- Ethiopian calendar: 1991–1992
- Hebrew calendar: 5759–5760
- Hindu calendars
- Vikram Samvat: 2055–2056
- Shaka Samvat: 1920–1921
- Kali Yuga: 5099–5100
- Holocene calendar: 11999
- Igbo calendar: 999–1000
- Iranian calendar: 1377–1378
- Islamic calendar: 1419–1420
- Japanese calendar: Heisei 11 (平成１１年)
- Javanese calendar: 1931–1932
- Juche calendar: 88
- Julian calendar: Gregorian minus 13 days
- Korean calendar: 4332
- Minguo calendar: ROC 88 民國88年
- Nanakshahi calendar: 531
- Thai solar calendar: 2542
- Tibetan calendar: ས་ཕོ་སྟག་ལོ་ (male Earth-Tiger); 2125 or 1744 or 972 — to — ས་མོ་ཡོས་ལོ་ (female Earth-Hare); 2126 or 1745 or 973
- Unix time: 915148800 – 946684799

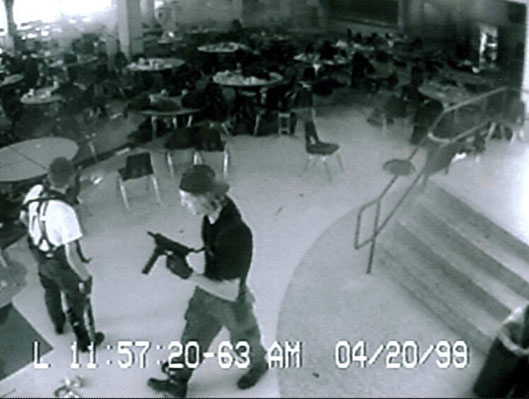
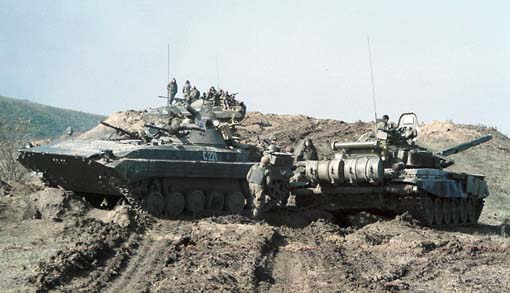
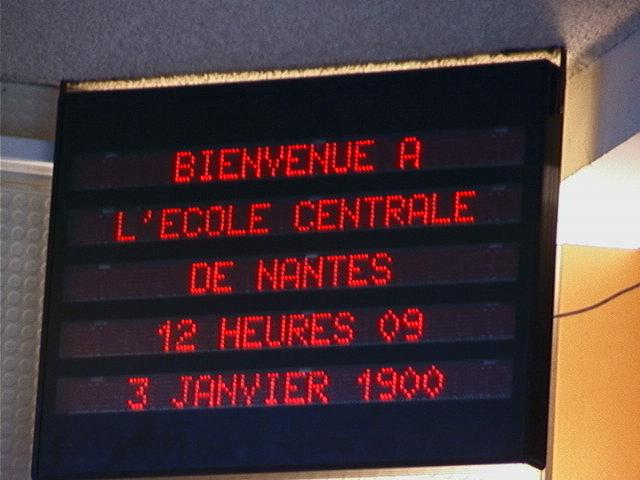
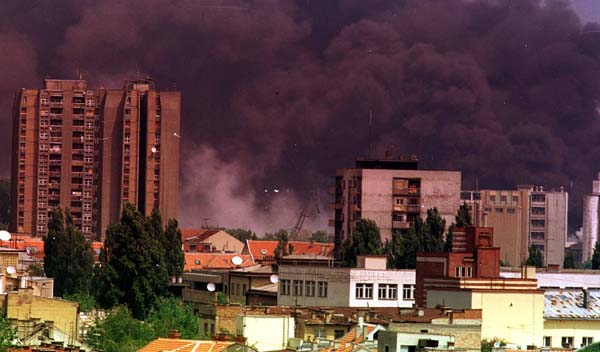
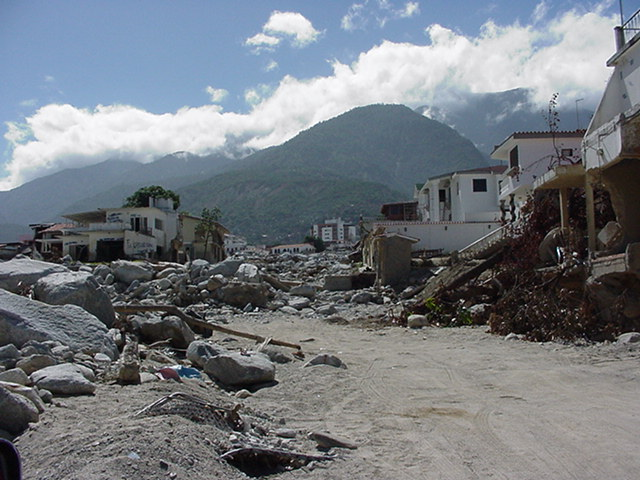
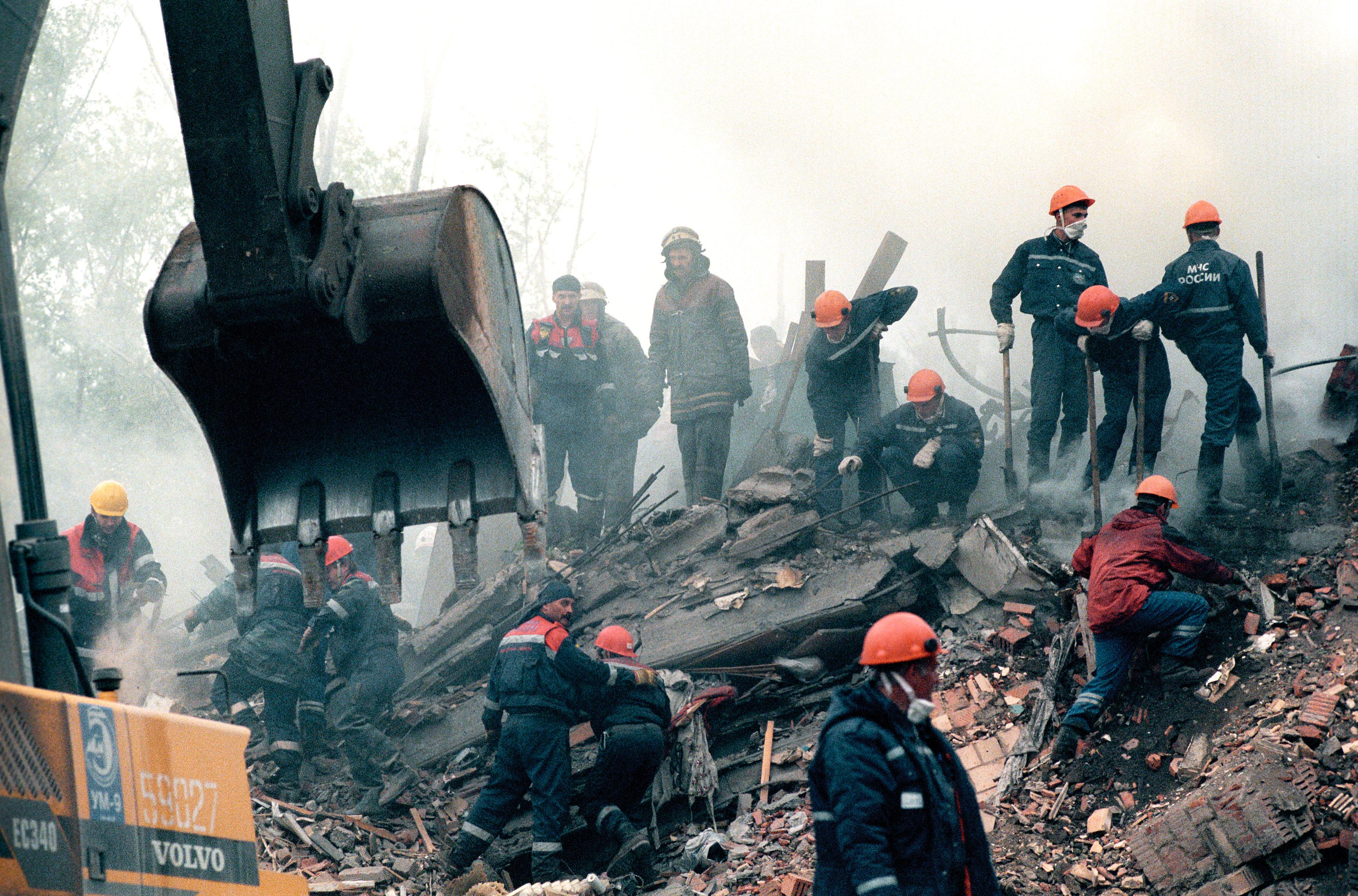
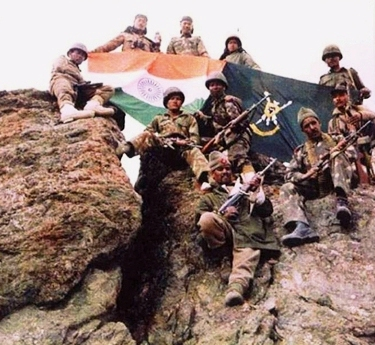
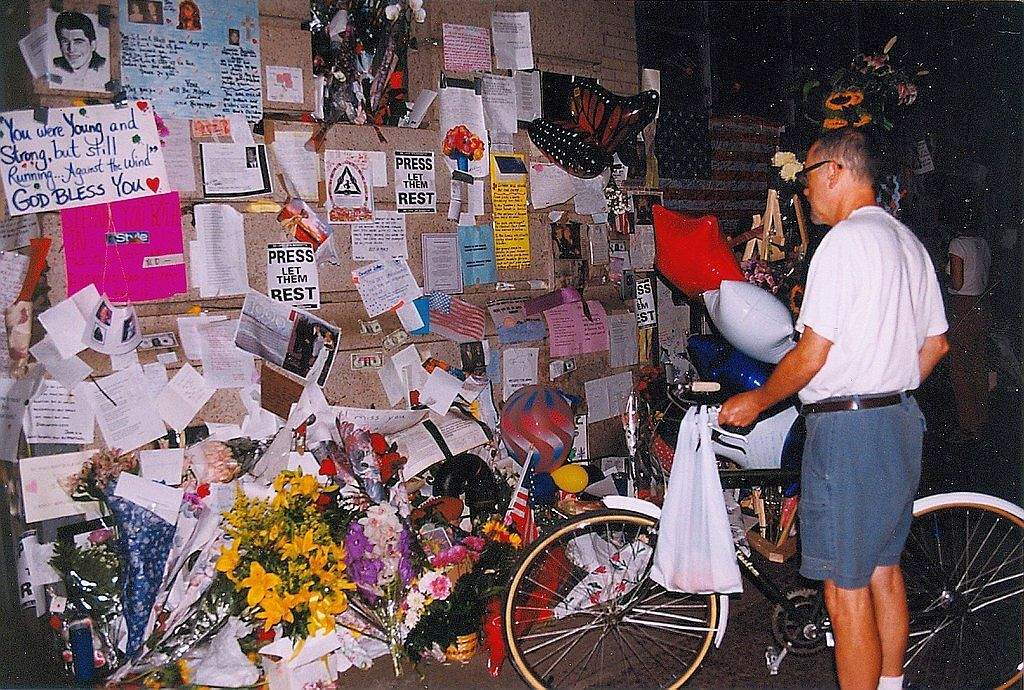
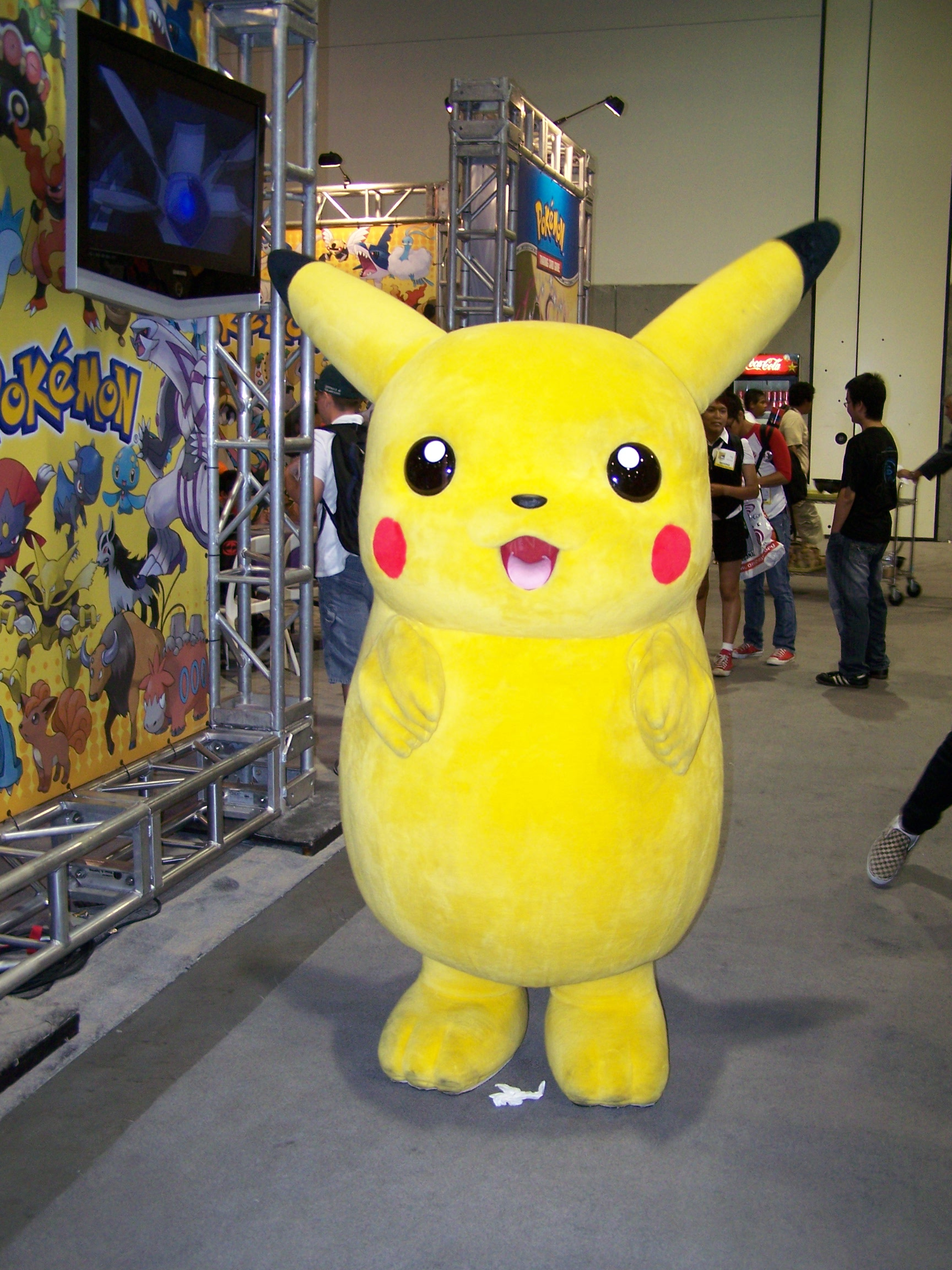
From top to bottom, left to right:
- the Columbine High School massacre makes international headlines for being one of the deadliest school shootings in United States history;
- the Second Chechen War begins;
- concern grows over the Year 2000 problem;
- the NATO bombing of Yugoslavia escalates the Kosovo War;
- the Vargas tragedy devastates Venezuela;
- the 1999 Russian apartment bombings trigger a security crisis;
- the Kargil War erupts between India and Pakistan;
- the 1999 Martha's Vineyard plane crash kills John F. Kennedy Jr. and Carolyn Bessette Kennedy;
- and Pokémania sparks a global craze for Pokemon.

1999 (MCMXCIX) was a common year starting on Friday of the Gregorian calendar, the 1999th year of the Common Era (CE) and Anno Domini (AD) designations, the 999th year of the 2nd millennium, the 99th year of the 20th century, and the 10th and last year of the 1990s decade.

1999 was designated as the International Year of Older Persons.

== Events ==
=== January ===
- January 1 – The euro currency is established, and the European Central Bank assumes full powers.
- January 3 – The Mars Polar Lander is launched by NASA.
- January 10 – American crime drama series The Sopranos premieres on HBO, beginning what many commentators describe as the second “Golden Age of Television”.
- January 25 – The 6.2 M_{w} Colombia earthquake strikes western Colombia, killing at least 1,900 people.

=== February ===
- February 7 – Abdullah II inherits the throne of Jordan, following the death of his father, King Hussein.
- February 11 – Pluto moves along its eccentric orbit further from the Sun than Neptune. It had been nearer than Neptune since 1979, and will become again in 2231.
- February 12 – U.S. President Bill Clinton is acquitted in impeachment proceedings in the United States Senate.
- February 16
  - In Uzbekistan, an apparent assassination attempt against President Islam Karimov takes place at government headquarters.
  - Across Europe, Kurdish protestors take over embassies and hold hostages after Turkey arrests one of their rebel leaders, Abdullah Öcalan.
- February 23
  - Kurdish rebel leader Abdullah Öcalan is charged with treason in Ankara, Turkey.
  - 1999 Galtür avalanche: An avalanche destroys the village of Galtür, Austria, killing 31.
- February 27 – While trying to circumnavigate the world in a hot air balloon, Colin Prescot and Andy Elson set a new endurance record after being aloft for 233 hours and 55 minutes.

=== March ===
- March 1
  - One of four bombs detonated in Lusaka, Zambia, which destroys the Angolan Embassy.
  - Rwandan Hutu rebels kill and dismember eight foreign tourists at the Buhoma homestead, Uganda.
  - The Ottawa Treaty comes into force.
- March 12 – Former Warsaw Pact members Hungary, Poland, and the Czech Republic join NATO.
- March 15 – The Santer Commission of the EU resigns over allegations of corruption.
- March 21
  - Bertrand Piccard and Brian Jones become the first to circumnavigate the Earth in a hot air balloon.
  - The 71st Academy Awards are held at the Dorothy Chandler Pavilion in Los Angeles with Shakespeare in Love winning Best Picture.
- March 24
  - NATO launches air strikes against the Federal Republic of Yugoslavia, marking the first time NATO has attacked a sovereign state.
  - A fire in the Mont Blanc Tunnel kills 39 people, closing the tunnel for nearly three years.
- March 26 – The Melissa virus attacks the Internet.
- March 27 – Kosovo War: A U.S. Lockheed F-117 Nighthawk is shot down by Yugoslav forces.
- March 28 – The adult animated sitcom Futurama premiered on Fox.
- March 29 – For the first time, the Dow Jones Industrial Average closes above the 10,000 mark, at 10,006.78.

=== April ===
- April 1 – Nunavut, an Inuit homeland, is created from the eastern portion of the Northwest Territories to become Canada's third territory.
- April 5
  - Two Libyans suspected of bringing down Pan Am Flight 103 in 1988 are handed over to Scottish authorities for eventual trial in the Netherlands. The United Nations suspends sanctions against Libya.
  - In Laramie, Wyoming, Russell Henderson pleads guilty to kidnapping and felony murder, in order to avoid a possible death penalty conviction for the apparent hate crime killing of Matthew Shepard.
- April 7 – Kosovo War: Kosovo's main border crossings are closed by Yugoslav forces to prevent Kosovo Albanians from leaving.
- April 9 – Ibrahim Baré Maïnassara, president of Niger, is assassinated.
- April 14 – Kosovo War: NATO warplanes repeatedly bomb ethnic Albanian refugee convoys for 2 hours over a 12-mile stretch of road, after mistaking them for Yugoslav military trucks, between Đakovica and Dečani in western Kosovo, killing at least 73 refugees.
- April 20 – Columbine High School massacre: 14 people, including 13 students (Note: Includes a victim who died in 2025 from injuries sustained during the massacre.) and one teacher, are killed in a mass shooting and attempted bombing at a high school in Columbine, Colorado; 23 others are injured by the two student perpetrators, who then kill themselves.
- April 26
  - Sultan Salahuddin of Selangor becomes the 11th Yang di-Pertuan Agong of Malaysia.
  - British TV presenter Jill Dando, 37, is shot dead on the doorstep of her home in Fulham, London.
- April 30 – Cambodia joins the Association of Southeast Asian Nations (ASEAN), bringing the total members to 10.

=== May ===
- May 1 – Children's animated television series SpongeBob SquarePants premieres on Nickelodeon after the 1999 Kids' Choice Awards.
- May 3 – 1999 Oklahoma tornado outbreak: a devastating tornado, rated F5 on the Fujita scale, hits southern and eastern Oklahoma City metropolitan area, killing 36 people (and 5 indirectly) and producing the highest winds recorded on Earth: 301 ± 20 mph (484 ± 32 km/h).
- May 7
  - Kosovo War: in the Federal Republic of Yugoslavia, three Chinese embassy workers are killed and 20 others wounded when a NATO B-2 aircraft bombs the Chinese Embassy in Belgrade.
  - In Guinea-Bissau, President João Bernardo Vieira is ousted in a military coup.
- May 9 – Mother's Day bus crash: a charter bus veers off the roadway before colliding with a dirk embankment in New Orleans, Louisiana, United States, killing 22 passengers and injuring another 22.
- May 12 – David Steel becomes the first Presiding Officer (Speaker) of the modern Scottish Parliament.
- May 13 – Carlo Azeglio Ciampi is elected President of Italy.
- May 14–June 20 – The 1999 Cricket World Cup is held in England, (some matches in Scotland, Ireland, Wales and the Netherlands), with Australia defeating Pakistan in the final.
- May 17 – Ehud Barak is elected prime minister of Israel.
- May 23 – The WWF pay-per-view event Over the Edge takes place at Kemper Arena in Kansas City, Missouri. The event is tragically remembered for the accidental death of wrestler Owen Hart during a stunt.
- May 26
  - Kargil War: The Indian Air Force launches an attack on intruding Pakistan Army troops and mujahideen militants in Kashmir.
  - The 1999 UEFA Champions League final takes place at the Camp Nou Stadium, Barcelona, in which the English side Manchester United defeats the German side Bayern Munich 2–1.
- May 27
  - The International Criminal Tribunal for the former Yugoslavia in The Hague, Netherlands indicts Slobodan Milošević and four others for war crimes and crimes against humanity committed in Kosovo.
  - Space Shuttle Discovery is launched on STS-96, the first shuttle mission to dock with the International Space Station.
- May 28
  - Two Swedish police officers are wounded by bank robbers armed with automatic firearms, and later executed with their own service pistols in Malexander, Sweden.
  - After 22 years of restoration work, Leonardo da Vinci's The Last Supper is placed back on display in Milan, Italy.
- May 29 – Nigeria terminates military rule, and the Fourth Nigerian Republic is established with Olusegun Obasanjo as president.

=== June ===
- June 1
  - Napster, a music downloading service, is created; it would later inspire other file-sharing sites such as The Pirate Bay, LimeWire, Gnutella, Kazaa, Morpheus, BearShare, and ΜTorrent 1999–2010 period which some called the "Second Golden Age of Piracy".
  - American Airlines Flight 1420 crash lands after overrunning the runway at Little Rock National Airport, killing 11 of the 145 people on board.
- June 2 – The King of Bhutan allows television transmissions to commence in the Kingdom for the first time, coinciding with the King's Silver Jubilee.
- June 5 – The Islamic Salvation Army, the armed wing of the Islamic Salvation Front, agrees in principle to disband in Algeria.
- June 8 – The government of Colombia announces it will include the estimated value of the country's illegal drug crops, exceeding half a billion US dollars, in its gross national product.
- June 9 – Kosovo War: Yugoslavia and NATO sign a peace treaty to end their hostilities.
- June 10 – Kosovo War: NATO suspends its airstrikes after Slobodan Milošević agrees to withdraw Yugoslav forces from Kosovo.
- June 12 – Kosovo War: Operation Joint Guardian/Operation Agricola begins: NATO-led United Nations peacekeeping forces KFOR enter Kosovo, Yugoslavia.
- June 16 – Thabo Mbeki is inaugurated as the second president of South Africa, marking the first peaceful transfer of executive power in the country's post-democratization history.
- June 18 – The J18 international anti-globalization protests are organized in dozens of cities around the world, some of which led to riots.
- June 19 – Turin, Italy, is awarded the 2006 Winter Olympics.
- June 20 – Australia defeats Pakistan by 8 wickets at Lord's Cricket Ground in London in the 1999 Cricket World Cup Final, securing their second World Cup title.
- June 24 – Kosovo War: NATO marines shoot three gunmen in Kosovo, Yugoslavia after being attacked by the latter, killing one of them and injuring the other two.
- June 25 – Bosnia and Herzegovina gets a new national anthem.
- June 30 – Twenty-three people die in a fire at the Sealand Youth Training Center in South Korea.

=== July ===
- July 1 – Europol (short for European Police Office) the European Union's criminal intelligence agency becomes fully operational.
- July 7 – In Rome, Hicham El Guerrouj runs the fastest mile ever recorded, at 3:43.13.
- July 10 – American soccer player Brandi Chastain scores the game winning penalty kick against China in the final of the FIFA Women's World Cup.
- July 11 – India recaptures Kargil, forcing the Pakistani army to retreat. India announces victory, ending the 2-month conflict.
- July 14 – the Big Blue crane collapse happened during the construction of Miller Park, killing three iron workers.
- July 15 – T-Mobile Park (formerly known as Safeco Field) opens for the first time.
- July 16 – John F. Kennedy Jr. dies in a plane crash off Martha's Vineyard.
- July 18 – MLB Pitcher David Cone of the New York Yankees, throws the 16th perfect game in Major League Baseball history.
- July 20
  - Mercury program: Liberty Bell 7 – piloted by Gus Grissom in 1961 – is raised from the Atlantic Ocean.
  - Falun Gong is banned in the People's Republic of China under Jiang Zemin.
- July 22–25 – Woodstock '99 was held in Rome, New York at former Griffiss Air Force Base, which was marred with difficult environmental conditions, poor sanitation, overpriced food and water, looting, violence, rapes, riots and several deaths.
- July 23
  - NASA's Chandra X-ray Observatory is launched.
  - Mohammed VI of Morocco becomes king upon the death of his father Hassan II.
  - Fourteen Kosovar Serb villagers are killed by ethnic Albanian gunmen in the village of Staro Gračko.
- July 27 – Twenty-one people die in a canyoning disaster at the Saxetenbach Gorge near Interlaken, Switzerland.
- July 31 – NASA intentionally crashes the Lunar Prospector spacecraft into the Moon, thus ending its mission to detect frozen water on the lunar surface.

=== August ===
- August 7 – Dagestan incursions: Hundreds of Chechen guerrillas invade the Russian republic of Dagestan, triggering the short war.
- August 10 – The Atlantique incident occurs as an intruding Pakistan Navy plane is shot down in India, sparking tensions between the two nations, a month after the end of the Kargil War.
- August 11 – A total solar eclipse is seen in Europe and Asia.
- August 17 – The 7.6 M_{w} İzmit earthquake shakes northwestern Turkey with a maximum Mercalli intensity of IX (Violent), leaving more than 17,000 dead and around 50,000 injured.
- August 19 – In Belgrade, tens of thousands of Yugoslavs rally to demand the resignation of Yugoslav President Slobodan Milošević.
- August 26 – WWE introduce their secondary program, SmackDown, which started its broadcast on UPN.
- August 30 – East Timor votes for independence from Indonesia (which had invaded and occupied it since 1975) in a referendum.

=== September ===
- September 3 – The 1999 Ontario Highway 401 crash occurs, involving 87 vehicles and killing 8.
- September 7 – The 6.0 M_{w} Athens earthquake hits with a maximum Mercalli intensity of IX (Violent), killing 143, injuring 800–1,600, and leaving 50,000 homeless.
- September 8 – The first of a series of Russian apartment bombings occurs. Subsequent bombings occur on September 13 and 16, while a bombing on September 22 fails.
- September 9 – Sega releases the Dreamcast in North America, marking the launch of its final home video game console.
- September 12 – Under international pressure to allow an international peacekeeping force, Indonesian president BJ Habibie announces that he will do so.
- September 14 – Kiribati, Nauru and Tonga join the United Nations.
- September 20 – Start of the 1999 Greek stock market crash.
- September 21 – The 7.7 M_{w} 921 earthquake (also known as the Jiji earthquake) affects central Taiwan with a maximum Mercalli intensity of X (Extreme) leaving 2,400 people dead and more than 11,000 injured.
- September 23 – NASA permanently loses contact with the Mars Climate Orbiter during orbital insertion around Mars, resulting in the spacecraft's loss and the failure of the mission.

=== October ===
- October 1 – Shanghai Pudong International Airport opens in China, becoming the primary international airport serving Shanghai and taking over all international flights from Shanghai Hongqiao International Airport.
- October 1–November 6 – The 1999 Rugby World Cup, the first World Cup in the professional era of rugby is held in Wales and is won by Australia who beat France in the final.
- October 5 – Thirty-one people die in the Ladbroke Grove rail crash, west of London, England.
- October 12
  - Pakistani Prime Minister Nawaz Sharif attempts to dismiss Army Chief General Pervez Musharraf, who is out of the country. The generals lead a coup d'état, ousting Sharif's administration, and Musharraf takes control of the government.
  - Murder of Björn Söderberg in Stockholm, Sweden by neo-fascists.
- The Croatian cargo ship Borak, sailing from Koromačno to Solin and transporting cement, sank near Sestrica Vela after its cargo shifted because of bad weather. Two crew members (Valter Cimera and Stjepan Španić) lost their lives, while the other three (Ante Jureško, owner and captain of the ship, his son Slavko, as well as Muhamed Čeliković) were rescued by Damir Badžim (from Šibenik) and Slaviša Malešević (refugee from Bosnia and Herzegovina).
- October 25 – Telenovela Yo soy Betty, la fea debuts on RCN Televisión in Colombia. It will give rise to Ugly Betty and at least a dozen other versions worldwide.
- October 27 – Armenian parliament shooting: Gunmen open fire in Armenia's National Assembly building, killing Prime Minister Vazgen Sargsyan, Parliament Chairman Karen Demirchyan, and six other members.
- October 29 – 1999 Odisha cyclone: A super cyclonic storm impacts Orissa, India, killing approximately 10,000 people.
- October 30 – 1999 Incheon bar fire: A bar catches fire in Incheon, South Korea, killing 56 people.
- October 31
  - EgyptAir Flight 990, travelling from New York City to Cairo, crashes off the coast of Nantucket, Massachusetts killing all 217 on board.
  - The Catholic Church and several Lutheran Church leaders sign the Joint Declaration on the Doctrine of Justification, attempting to resolve a centuries-old doctrinal dispute over the nature of faith and salvation.

=== November ===
- November 6 – Australians defeat a referendum proposing the replacement of the Queen and the Governor General with a President to make Australia a republic.
- November 12 – The 7.2 M_{w} Düzce earthquake shakes northwestern Turkey with a maximum Mercalli intensity of IX (Violent). At least 845 people are killed and almost 5,000 are injured.
- November 20 – China launches the first Shenzhou spacecraft.
- November 23 – The National Assembly of Kuwait revokes a 1985 law that granted women's suffrage.
- November 26 – The 7.5 M_{w} Ambrym earthquake shakes Vanuatu and a destructive tsunami follows, killing 10 and injuring 40.
- November 27 – The centre-left Labour Party takes control of the New Zealand Government, with leader Helen Clark becoming the second female Prime Minister in New Zealand's history.

=== December ===
- December 3
  - After rowing for 81 days and 5,486 kilometers (2,962 nautical miles), Tori Murden becomes the first woman to cross the Atlantic Ocean by rowboat alone, when she reaches Guadeloupe from the Canary Islands.
  - NASA loses radio contact with the Mars Polar Lander, moments before the spacecraft enters the Martian atmosphere.
- December 5 – Bolivian municipal elections, the first election contested by Evo Morales' Movimiento al Socialismo.
- December 9 – The hormone Ghrelin is discovered and named.
- December 18 – NASA launches the Terra platform into orbit, carrying five Earth Observation instruments, including ASTER, CERES, MISR, MODIS and MOPITT.
- December 20 – Handover of Macau: the Portuguese Republic transfers administration of Macau to the People's Republic of China after 442 years of Portuguese rule in the settlement.
- December 24 – Indian Airlines Flight 814 was hijacked on 24 December 1999 by five members of Harkat-ul-Mujahideen in what was considered to be India's worst and last plane hijacking
- December 26 – Cyclone Lothar kills 140 people as it crosses France, southern Germany, and Switzerland.
- December 27 – A day after Cyclone Lothar, Cyclone Martin causes additional damage throughout France, Spain, Switzerland and Italy, including an emergency due to flooding at the Blayais Nuclear Power Plant.
- December 31
  - Boris Yeltsin resigns as President of Russia, leaving Prime Minister Vladimir Putin as the acting president until a new election can be held.
  - With the Torrijos–Carter Treaties being put into effect on this day, Panama gains full control of the Canal.
  - Millennium celebrations: A series of worldwide celebrations mark the end of 1999 and the beginning of the year 2000, popularly regarded as the start of the 21st century and the 3rd millennium, with fireworks displays, concerts, and public festivities held across the globe.

== Nobel Prizes ==

- Physics – Gerard 't Hooft and Martinus J. G. Veltman
- Chemistry – Ahmed Zewail
- Physiology or Medicine – Günter Blobel
- Literature – Günter Grass
- Peace – Médecins Sans Frontières
- Bank of Sweden Prize in Economic Sciences in Memory of Alfred Nobel – Robert Mundell

== New English words and terms ==
- blog
- carbon footprint
- dashcam
- epigenomics
- metabolomics
- texting
- vape
