= Phlek Chhat =

Cambodian politician

Phlek Chhat (Khmer: ផ្លែក ឆាត; 16 February 1922 – ?) is the former industry minister of Cambodia. He was also director general of the plan at the Ministry of Information.

== Selected publications ==
- La Conquête de l'Indépendance Économique du Cambodge. Ministry of Information, Phnom Penh, 1964.
