= Costas Simitis =

Prime Minister of Greece from 1996 to 2004

Konstantinos Simitis
- Κώστας Σημίτης
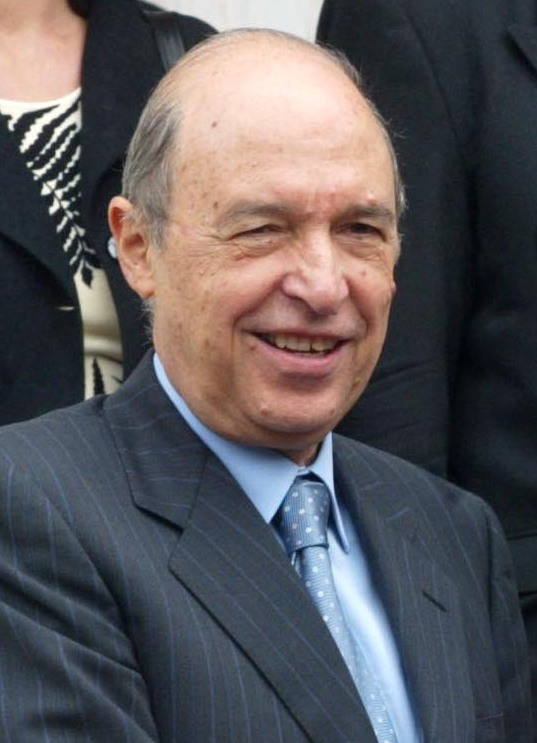
- Simitis in 2003

Prime Minister of Greece
- In office 22 January 1996 – 10 March 2004
- President: Konstantinos Stephanopoulos
- Preceded by: Andreas Papandreou
- Succeeded by: Kostas Karamanlis

President of the Panhellenic Socialist Movement
- In office 30 June 1996 – 8 February 2004
- Preceded by: Andreas Papandreou
- Succeeded by: George Papandreou
Ministerial offices
Minister of Industry, Energy, Research and Technology
In office 13 October 1993 – 15 September 1995
Prime Minister	Andreas Papandreou
Preceded by	Vasileios Kontogiannopoulos
Succeeded by	Anastasios Peponis
Minister of Trade
In office 13 October 1993 – 15 September 1995
Prime Minister	Andreas Papandreou
Preceded by	Vasileios Kontogiannopoulos
Succeeded by	Nikolaos Akritidis
Minister of National Education and Religious Affairs
In office 23 November 1989 – 13 February 1990
Prime Minister	Xenophon Zolotas
Preceded by	Konstantinos Despotopoulos
Succeeded by	Konstantinos Despotopoulos
Minister of National Economy
In office 26 July 1985 – 27 November 1987
Prime Minister	Andreas Papandreou
Preceded by	Gerasimos Arsenis
Succeeded by	Panagiotis Roumeliotis
Minister of Agriculture
In office 21 October 1981 – 26 July 1985
Prime Minister	Andreas Papandreou
Preceded by	Athanasios Kanellopoulos
Succeeded by	Ioannis Pottakis

Member of the Hellenic Parliament
- In office 2 June 1985 – 7 September 2009
- Constituency: Piraeus A

Personal details
- Born: 23 June 1936 Piraeus, Greece
- Died: 5 January 2025 (aged 88) Corinth , Greece
- Resting place: First Cemetery of Athens
- Party: Panhellenic Socialist Movement
- Other political affiliations: PASOK – Movement for Change
- Spouse: Daphne Arkadiou (m. 1964)
- Children: 2
- Relatives: Spiros Simitis (brother)
- Education: University of Marburg; London School of Economics
- Website: Costas Simitis Foundation

Konstantinos Simitis (Greek: Κωνσταντίνος Σημίτης; 23 June 1936 – 5 January 2025) was a Greek politician who led the 'Modernization' movement of Greece. He succeeded in leadership Andreas Papandreou, the founder of the Panhellenic Socialist Movement (PASOK), and served as Prime Minister of Greece from 1996 to 2004.

Simitis, a former resistance figure against the Greek Junta (1967–1974) and economics professor in Germany, was a founding member of PASOK in 1974, and gained significant ministerial experience in Papandreou's governments. Simitis' reputation was marked when he became Minister of National Economy in 1985 when PASOK's profligacy needed a new financial 'stability' imposed through an economic adjustment programme. With stability achieved and the party's popularity waning, Papandreou distanced himself from Simitis' policies, and Simitis resigned. As Minister of Trade in 1995, Simitis became the first minister to resign in protest against Papandreou, who refused to resign the premiership despite ill health and who had criticised Simitis' policies.

In January 1996, Simitis won the leadership of PASOK after Papandreou's resignation. However, the leadership transition from Papandreou to Simitis was confrontational by Papandreou's loyalists, who wanted to prevent such a transition from being realized. Simitis lacked his predecessor's charisma, and the fractured party's support limited many of his actions in government. However, by the end of his tenure in 2004, Simitis had several significant achievements and reforms in the wider society and economy to proclaim. After two decades of financial stagnation, the Greek economy was put in order and became one of the fastest-growing economies in Europe through gradual privatization policies, with an average annual increase of 4.1% of gross domestic product (GDP). The performance of the Greek economy under Simitis sealed the Greek entry into the Euro currency, closing the journey of aligning Greece with the West, which started with Eleftherios Venizelos and continued with Constantine Karamanlis.

The successful completion of the Athens 2004 Summer Olympics also boosted Greece's positive image as a modern state capable of undertaking sophisticated tasks. Moreover, a variety of large-scale infrastructure projects were completed, like the Eleftherios Venizelos airport, the Athens Ring road, Athens Metro, and Rio–Antirrio Bridge. New institutions were also introduced, such as the Greek Ombudsman and several regulatory bodies to supervise market liberalization. In foreign policy, his government's reaction to the Imia crisis in 1996 and the capture of Abdullah Öcalan in 1999 were criticized, but his refusal to intervene in the NATO bombing of Yugoslavia and the invasion of Iraq proved popular. Simitis also succeeded in the Cypriot accession into the EU, a diplomatic priority for Greece, but the Annan Plan, which his government championed, was rejected in a referendum.

After the debt crisis erupted in Greece in 2009, the legacy of Simitis was re-interpreted by critics as insufficient or misleading. However, government institutions under Simitis were developed and strengthened in their capacity to reform, appearing both more 'modern' and 'European.'

== Biography ==
Costas Simitis was born in Piraeus to Georgios Simitis, a Professor at the School of Economic and Commercial Sciences who later became a member of the National Liberation Front government in World War II, and to his wife Fani (née Christopoulou). He studied law at the University of Marburg in Germany and economics at the London School of Economics. He was married to Daphne Arkadiou (b. 1938) and had two daughters, Fiona and Marilena. He resided in the Kolonaki district of Athens. His brother Spiros Simitis was a prominent jurist specializing in data privacy in Germany.

=== Political activity before 1981 ===
In 1965, he returned to Greece and was one of the founders of the "Alexandros Papanastasiou" political research group. In 1967, after the military coup on 21 April, this group was transformed into Democratic Defense, an organization opposed to the military regime. Simitis fled abroad after planting bombs in the streets of Athens (in later years, he acknowledged his activities on the Greek MEGA TV channel) in order to avoid being jailed and became a member of the Panhellenic Liberation Movement (PAK), led by Andreas Papandreou. He also took up a position as a university lecturer in Germany. He returned to Athens in 1974 and was one of the co-founders of PAK's successor, the Panhellenic Socialist Movement (PASOK). In 1977, he took up a lecturer's post at the Panteion University.

=== Ministerial offices ===
Simitis was not a candidate for the Greek Parliament in the 1981 elections, but he was appointed Minister of Agriculture in the first PASOK government of that year. Following the 1985 elections and his election as a deputy to the Parliament, he became Minister of National Economy; he undertook an unpopular stabilization program, trying to curb inflation and reduce deficits, but resigned his post in 1987 because he felt that his policies were being undermined. In 1993, he took over the Ministry of Commerce and Industry, but in 1995, he again resigned from the ministry and the party's Executive Bureau following a public rebuke he received from Prime Minister Andreas Papandreou.

=== Rise to the offices of Prime Minister and President of PASOK ===
On 16 January 1996, Papandreou resigned as Prime Minister due to ill health. In a special election held by the party's parliamentary group on 18 January, Simitis was elected in his place over the candidacies of Akis Tsochatzopoulos, Gerasimos Arsenis and Ioannis Charalambopoulos. Papandreou, however, remained Chairman of the party for the next months until his death on 23 June (also Simitis' 60th birthday), just before a party conference would select the party's vice-president; after Papandreou's death, the conference would elect the new Party President. Simitis was elected in PASOK's Fourth Congress on 30 June, defeating Akis Tsochatzopoulos on a platform of support for the European Union.

Simitis then led the party in the national elections of 22 September 1996, gaining a mandate in his own right. He also narrowly won the national election of 2000. Although he is widely respected throughout Europe, in Greece, Simitis was regarded by some Greeks as a rather dull technocrat, lacking the charisma of Papandreou.

On 7 January 2004, with PASOK's popularity collapsing, Simitis announced that he would resign as party president and would not stand for re-election as Prime Minister in the forthcoming legislative elections. At the time, he was accused of bowing out to avoid humiliation at the polls. However, by the end of his tenure on 10 March, he would be in office for over eight consecutive years, the longest continuous term in modern Greek history. In a past interview, Simitis had already stated that he would remain prime minister for only two legislative periods since "he wanted to do other things in his life as well." On 8 January, he called elections for the party president to be held on 8 February. Simitis was succeeded as PASOK leader by the then-Minister of Foreign Affairs George Papandreou, the only candidate in these elections. Despite Papandreou's personal popularity, PASOK lost the 7 March elections to the conservative New Democracy party, whose leader Kostas Karamanlis succeeded Simitis in the office of Prime Minister.

=== Political activity after 2004 ===
After the 2004 electoral defeat, Simitis remained a Member of the Hellenic Parliament for Piraeus, sitting on the Standing Committee on National Defence and Foreign Affairs. Re-elected in September 2007, he entered into a conflict with his successor as PASOK leader, George Papandreou, on the political choices of the party. In June 2008, he was excluded from the PASOK parliamentary group after opposing Papandreou's position in favour of a referendum on the Treaty of Lisbon, which he had helped to draft as member of the Amato Group. Though never formally excluded from the party, he kept his distance with the leadership and could not come to terms with Papandreou in time to be a candidate for the 2009 elections, upon which he definitively left his MP seat for Piraeus. Before his departure, he warned of financial mismanagement that would lead to a harsh austerity regime in Greece imposed by the International Monetary Fund, which eventually came the following year.

=== Death ===
Simitis was found unconscious at his holiday home in Corinth , Greece on 5 January 2025. He was taken to a hospital, where he died hours later, aged 88. The government declared four days of official mourning and accorded Simitis a state funeral, which was held at the Metropolitan Cathedral of Athens on 9 January. He was then buried at the First Cemetery of Athens.

== Policies and legacy ==
=== Social policies ===
Various social reforms were carried out under Simitis. EKAS, an income-tested pension supplement that restored the link of minimum pension with 20 daily minimum wages, was introduced, while the pension replacement rate was set as 70% of the last five years of salaries. Seniority pensions were also introduced, along with a contributory pension scheme for farmers. Law 2738/1999 on "collective bargaining in the public administration, permanent status for workers employed under open-ended contracts and other provisions" laid down, for the first time, "the right of public servants to negotiate their terms and conditions of employment, excluding pay and pensions, and to conclude collective agreements." Law 2874/2000 on 'Employment regulations and other provisions,' in addition to working time arrangements, " regulates a range of important issues relating to labour relations, such as overtime, redundancies and matters involving leave," while Law 2839/2000 on 'Regulation of matters regarding the Ministry of Foreign Affairs, Public Administration and Decentralisation and other provisions' established a gender quota system in the public sector's various governing councils, administrative boards and collective bodies. In 2003, a substantial level of legislative activity relating to employment, workplace health and safety and social security took place.

=== Financial policies ===
Simitis is known mainly in Greece for his political philosophy, known as Eksynchronismos ("Modernization"), which focused on extensive public investment and infrastructure works as well as economic and labor reforms. His supporters credit Simitis with overcoming the chronic problems of the Greek economy and thus achieving Greece's admittance into the Eurozone. During his governance, official data presented inflation as having decreased from 15% to 3%, public deficits diminished from 14% to 3%, GDP increased at an annual average of 4%, and factual labor incomes increased at 3% per year. However, the macroeconomic data presented by Simitis' government were called into question by an audit performed by the successor government of New Democracy in 2004.

Many large-scale infrastructure projects were carried out or begun during the so-called 'era of Eksychronismos', such as the new "Eleftherios Venizelos" Athens International Airport, the Rio-Antirio Bridge, the Athens Metro and the A2 motorway (Egnatia Odos).

=== Internal issues ===
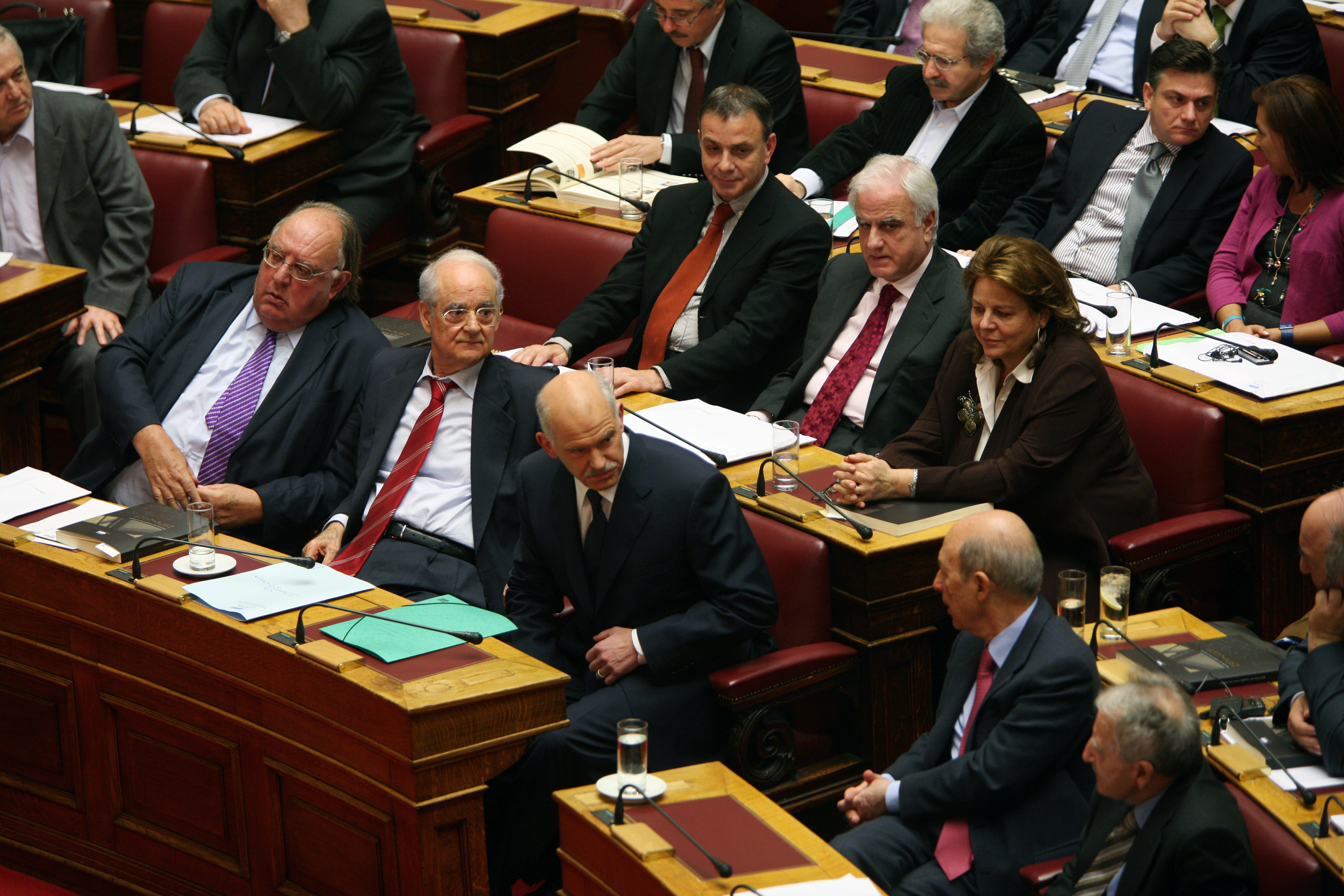
Costas Simitis in the Hellenic Parliament during budget discussions in 2009

In 2000, Simitis was embroiled in a dispute with the Archbishop of the influential Greek Orthodox Church, Christodoulos of Athens, when the Greek government sought to remove the "Religion" field from the national ID cards carried by Greek citizens on the grounds that the Hellenic Data Protection Authority recommended so; its decision also included the "Nationality" field, but was not implemented following a subsequent EE directive to the contrary. Christodoulos opposed the decision, claiming that the action pursued deviously the religious de-identification of the Greek nation. Faced with the government's robust but unpopular stance, he organized two massive demonstrations in Athens and Thessaloniki alongside a majority of bishops of the Church of Greece. Simitis' attitude gained faint-hearted support even within his party, but he found a surprisingly militant ally in the Eksychronismos opinion makers. Kostas Karamanlis, the opposition leader, signed a petition, organized by the Church of Greece, calling for a referendum on the matter and signed, too, by more than three million citizens. However, the inclusion of religious beliefs on ID cards, even on a voluntary basis, as the Church had asked, was deemed unconstitutional by the Greek courts.

=== Foreign policy ===
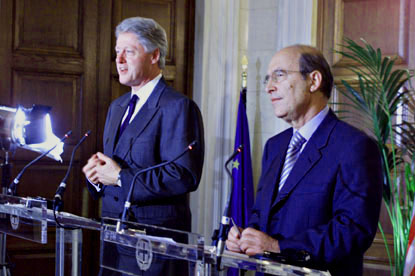
Costas Simitis with President Bill Clinton

While PASOK traditionalists disliked his move away from the more traditional/orthodox norms of the Democratic socialism of Andreas Papandreou' policies, and also his relative moderation on issues such as the Cyprus dispute and the Macedonia naming dispute, his supporters saw both of these as positive elements of the "eksynchronismos" movement that Simitis was seen as spearheading.

During January–June 2003, Simitis, as Greek Prime Minister, exercised the presidency of the European Council.

=== Controversy and criticism ===
In 1996, the appointment of the PASOK-leaning To Vima newspaper editor, Stavros Psycharis, as political administrator of Mount Athos was particularly criticized by the opposition.

==== Siemens bribery scandal ====
A significant issue during Simitis' tenure concerned corruption that was endemic in Greek public life (including the Siemens Greek bribery scandal, incidents like Akis Tsochatzopoulos, who later was imprisoned for criminal actions for the purchase of the German type 214 submarines) etc.

Siemens CEO Michalis Christoforakos testified that during his trial in Germany, he bribed (2%) both the two major political parties, ND and PASOK (through Geitonas and Tsoukatos, partner of Kostas Simitis). According to Tsoukatos, the money was put in PASOK's cash desk. As of 2018, Simitis was under prosecutor investigation regarding the Siemens Greek bribery scandal, but was later exonerated.

==== Validity of statistical data ====
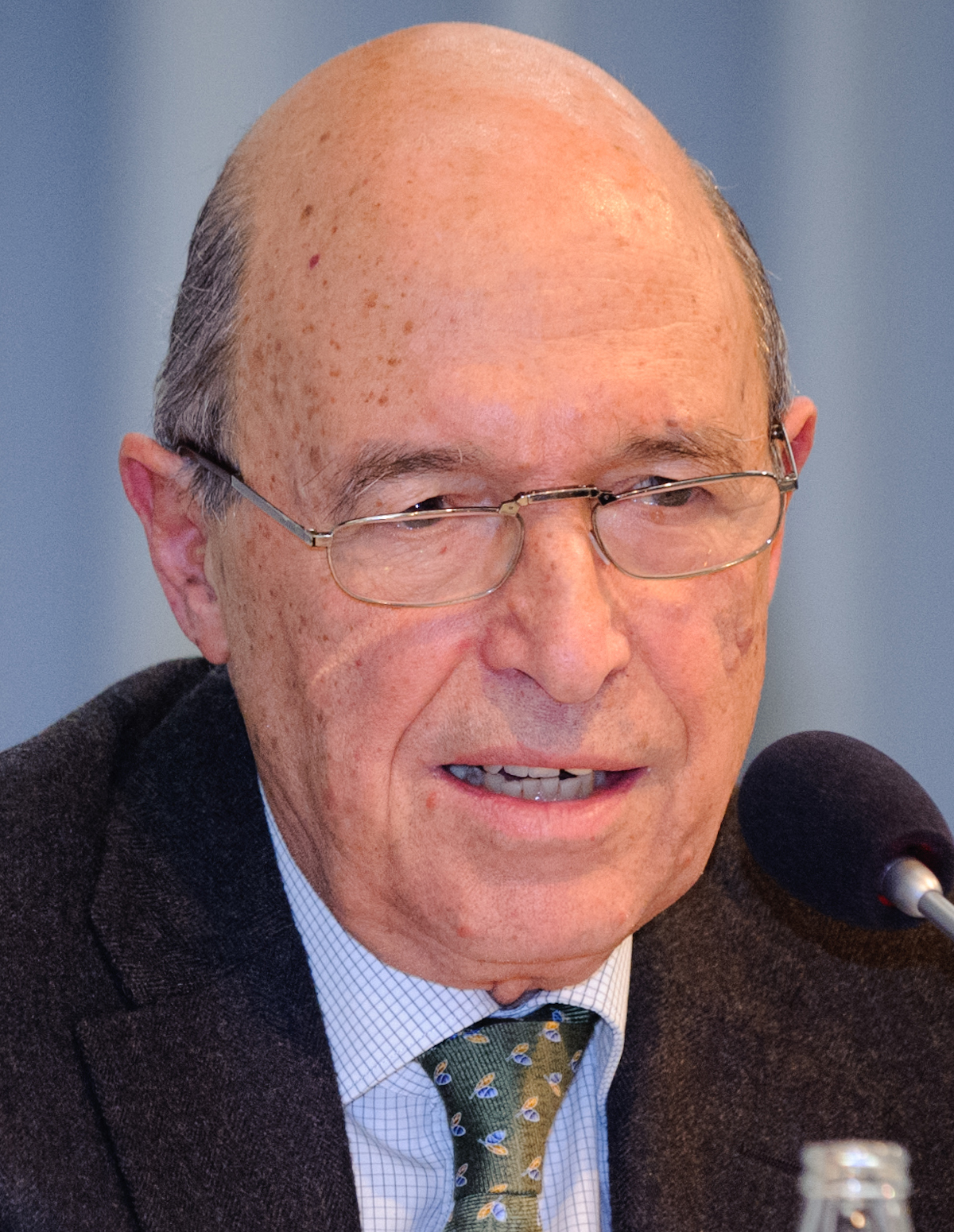
Simitis in 2012

New Democracy revised the size of the defense expenditures for the years 1997-2003 by changing the regulation for the cost accounting of the defense expenditures from the date of delivery of war material (delivery basis), which was at the time followed by half the countries of the EU, to the payment date of the advance payments (cash basis). Eurostat accepted the change, because of the lack of reliable data for the deliveries of war material. By the revision of the 1999 defense expenditures, the deficit of 1999, the year of the Greek economy's evaluation, amounted to 3.1%. Since 2005, Eurostat changed its rules and records the defense expenditures according to the delivery date for all the countries of the EU, including Greece. Eurostat requested that the member countries to correct their data retroactively. Greece did not proceed to the rectification.

The deficit of 1999, year of the Greek economy's evaluation, is still presented to be 3.1% of the Gross National product (GNP), greater than the Maastricht criterion for a deficit lower than 3% of the GNP. Subsequent revisions of the data show also other countries exceeding the fiscal deficit (government deficit) of 3% during the evaluation period. Thus, in 1997, which is the year of the evaluation of the first countries that became members of the Euro zone, the deficit of France was 3.3%, of Spain 3.4% and of Portugal 3.4%.

==== Other ====
Other points of criticism included the 1999 Greek stock market crash in the Athens Exchange, such as his handling on the Abdullah Öcalan's capture and the Imia incident regarding the foreign relations with Turkey.

Simitis rejected New Democracy's bills for accountability and transparency with regards to governmental expenditure and decisions, while New Democracy leader Kostas Karamanlis accused Simitis during a parliamentary plenum of being an "archpriest of cronyism", referencing the index of the NGO Transparency International. However, Greece's position has fallen by five places in the same index during the New Democracy government (2004–2009). Four years later Karamanlis himself admitted that he exaggerated and that he never doubted Simitis' personal integrity.

== Bibliography ==
Simitis has authored several books and articles ranging from economics and politics to legal issues.

Books

- Simitis, Costas (1979). Η δομική αντιπολίτευση [Structural Opposition] (in Greek). Athens: Καστανιώτης. ISBN 9780000300751.
- —————— (1981). Πολιτική Κυβέρνηση Δίκαιο [Politics, Government and Law] (in Greek). Athens: Καστανιώτης. ISBN 9780000302687.
- —————— (1990). Θέσεις για την πολιτική στρατηγική του Πανελλήνιου Σοσιαλιστικού Κινήματος [Views on the politic strategy of PASOK] (in Greek). Athens: Γνώση. ISBN 9780002350181.
- —————— (1992). Εθνικιστικός λαϊκισμός ή εθνική στρατηγική [Nationalist Populism or national strategy] (in Greek). Athens: Gnosi Publications. ISBN 9789602355299.
- —————— (1994). Ενωμένοι να τολμήσουμε [Let's dare united] (in Greek). Athens: Γνώση. ISBN 9780002350501.
- —————— (1995). Για μια κοινωνία ισχυρή για μια ισχυρή Ελλάδα [For a strong society and a strong Greece] (in Greek). Athens: Plethron Publications. ISBN 9789603480419.
- —————— (2002). Για μια Ελλάδα οικονομικά ισχυρή και κοινωνικά δίκαιη [For a financially strong and socially fair Greece] (in Greek). Athens: Kastanioti Publications. ISBN 9789600333398.
- —————— (2002). Για μια ισχυρή Ελλάδα στην Ευρώπη και στον κόσμο [For a strong Greece in Europe and in the world] (in Greek). Athens: Kastanioti Publications. ISBN 9789600333374.
- —————— (2002). Για μια ισχυρή Ελλάδα,σύγχρονη και δημοκρατική [For a strong, modern and democratic Greece] (in Greek). Athens: Kastanioti Publications. ISBN 9789600333381.
- —————— (2005). Πολιτική για μια Δημιουργική Ελλάδα 1996–2004 [Politics for a Creative Greece 1996–2004] (in Greek). Athens: Polis Publications. ISBN 9789604350759.
- —————— (2007). Στόχοι, στρατηγική, προοπτικές [Objectives, Strategy and Perspectives] (in Greek). Athens: Polis Publications. ISBN 9789604351374.
- —————— (2007). Η δημοκρατια σε κριση; [Democracy in Crisis?] (in Greek). Athens: Polis Publications. ISBN 9789604351527.
- —————— (2016). The European debt crisis. Manchester: Manchester University Press. ISBN 9780719095788.

Contributions

- N. Garganas; T. Thomopoulos; Costas Simitis; G. Spraos (1989). Η πολιτική της οικονομικής σταθεροποίησης [Politics of Financial stabilization] (in Greek). Athens: Gnosi Publications. ISBN 9789602350126.
- N. Mouzelis; T. Lipovach; M. Spourdalakis (1989). Λαϊκισμός και πολιτική [Populism and Politics] (in Greek). introduction by Costas Simitis. Athens: Gnosi Publications. ISBN 9789602350140.

== Additional reading ==
- Featherstone, Kevin; Sotiropoulos, Dimitri A., eds. (2020). The Oxford Handbook of Modern Greek Politics. Oxford: Oxford University Press. ISBN 978-0198825104.
- Koliopoulos, John S.; Veremis, Thanos M. [in Greek] (2009). Modern Greece A History Since 1821. Oxford: Wiley-Blackwell. ISBN 978-1-4443-1483-0.
- Close, David H. (2014). Greece since 1945: Politics, Economy and Society. London & New York: Taylor & Francis. ISBN 978-1-317-88001-1.
- Clogg, Richard (2013). A Concise History of Greece. Cambridge: Cambridge University Press. ISBN 978-1-107-65644-4.

Political offices
Preceded by Athanasios Kanellopoulos	Minister of Agriculture; 1981–1985	Succeeded by Ioannis Pottakis
Preceded by Gerasimos Arsenis	Minister of National Economy; 1985–1987	Succeeded by Panagiotis Roumeliotis
Preceded by Konstantinos Despotopoulos	Minister of National Education and Religious Affairs; 1989–1990	Succeeded by Konstantinos Despotopoulos
Preceded by Vasileios Kontogiannopoulos	Minister of Industry, Energy, Research and Technology; 1993–1995	Succeeded by Anastasios Peponis
Preceded by Vasileios Kontogiannopoulos	Minister of Trade; 1993–1995	Succeeded by Nikolaos Akritidis
Preceded by Andreas Papandreou	Prime Minister of Greece; 1996–2004	Succeeded by Kostas Karamanlis
Party political offices
Preceded by Andreas Papandreou	President of the Panhellenic Socialist Movement; 1996–2004	Succeeded by George Papandreou
Diplomatic posts
Preceded by Anders Fogh Rasmussen	President of the European Council; 2003	Succeeded by Silvio Berlusconi
