= Georgios Lianis =

Greek politician (1926–2008)

George Lianis Γεώργιος Λιάνης
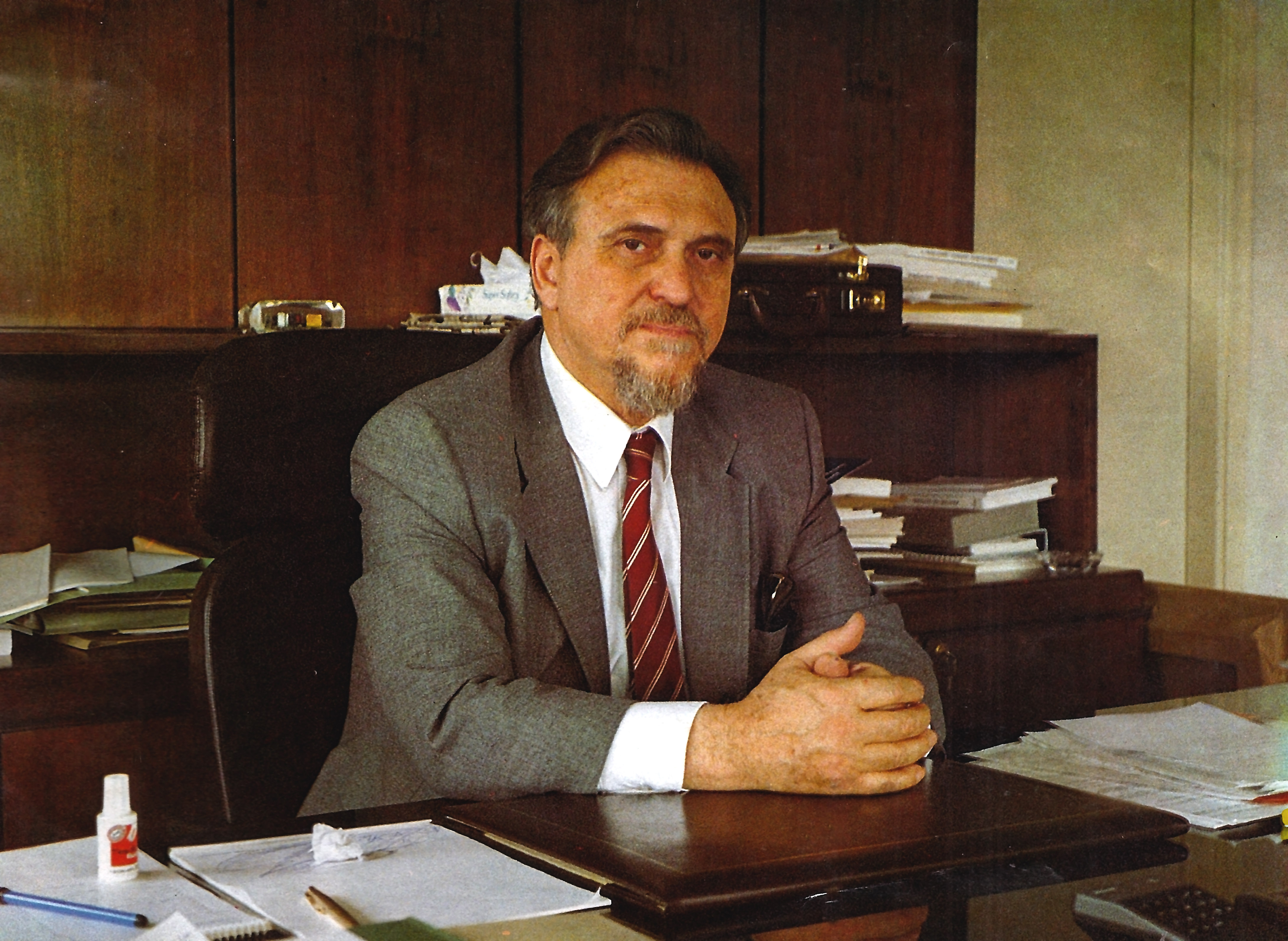
- George Lianis as Minister of Research and Technology

Deputy Minister of Education
- In office 21 October 1981 – 5 July 1982

Minister of Research and Technology
- In office 5 July 1982 – 5 June 1985
- Preceded by: -

Personal details
- Born: Georgios Lianis; 20 May 1926 Naoussa, Greece
- Died: 4 January 2008 (aged 81)
- Party: Panhellenic Socialist Movement
- Education: National Technical University of Athens; Imperial College London
- Profession: Academic; Politician

George (Georgios) Lianis (Greek: Γεώργιος Λιάνης, 20 May 1926 – 4 January 2008) was a Greek scholar, activist, diplomat, and cabinet member of the first term of government of PASOK, in 1981–1985. As cabinet member responsible for higher education, he authored the 1982 university reform that introduced the departmental system as a replacement for the professorial chair system and that established graduate schools. Then in 1983–1985, as Greece's first Minister of Research and Technology, he was instrumental in supporting the introduction of information technology and alternative energy, reorganizing the national research institutes, and establishing the system of centers of research innovation and excellence.

== Early life ==
Born in Naoussa, northern Greece, in 1926. During the Axis occupation, he was active in the youth resistance group EPON. In 1953 he graduated from the National Technical University of Athens with a degree in mechanical and electrical engineering. He received a PhD from Imperial College London in 1956 in mechanical engineering with a specialty in plasticity.

== Patras and dictatorship years ==
He had moved to the USA where he was professor of aerospace engineering at Purdue University with more than 75 publications in the fields of continuum thermodynamics and the relativistic physics of continuous media During this time, he first addressed the question of higher education reform in Greece. In 1964 he was invited to help organize at Patras, Greece, a new university incorporating a departmental system to replace the more hierarchical chair system then in use. This attempt at change ignited such overwhelming opposition, not only in the academy but also in the government itself, that any attempt at alteration was rejected.

The pursuit of reform was put on hold by the military dictatorship of 1967-1974. During this time in exile Lianis worked against the dictatorship, first as a member and later as the general secretary of the Panhellenic Liberation Movement (PAK) - North America. Upon the fall of the dictatorship he returned to Greece where he became professor in the chair of Mechanics at Aristotle University of Thessaloniki and head of PASOK - Thessaloniki.

== Higher Education Reform of 1982 ==
With the electoral victory of PASOK in 1981, Lianis joined the cabinet as Deputy Minister of Education in charge of Higher Education with the mission of enacting a substantial reform.

In 1982, Framework Law 1268/82 was passed. It established a departmental system in place of the traditional academic chair, created four levels of staff, and specified channels of promotion based on qualification exclusively. Graduate Schools were established with their own deans and faculties, and university self-governance grew to encompass junior staff and student participation. The new framework served to broaden the academic and administrative base of the university, including a less hierarchical structure and more opportunity for meritocratic advancement.

== Ministry of Research and Technology ==
In July 1982 Lianis became Greece's first Minister of Research and Technology. Early priorities were support of (then nascent) information technology and both an increase in the research budget and, crucially, new methods allowing research funding decisions to be made outside the usual cumbersome bureaucratic procedures. The latter initiative was finally codified in Law 1514/1985.

A fundamental priority of the Ministry was to cooperate in the establishment of centers of research excellence, beginning with the Research Institutes of Crete and later encompassing many national research centers as the Foundation of Research and Technology (FORTH).

At the level of the European Union, the July–December 1983 Greek presidency (during which Lianis oversaw the Council of Ministers of Research) bore fruit with the launch of ESPRIT, the first organization for pan-European information research.

== Later positions ==
After his term in the cabinet, Lianis became a member of Parliament on the honorary ticket of PASOK. He then served as Ambassador of Greece to Japan, South Korea, the Philippines, Malaysia, and several other Asian-Pacific nations. He died in 2008, at the age of 81.
