= Department of Commerce (disambiguation) =

The United States Department of Commerce is a Cabinet department of the United States government.

Department of Commerce may also refer to:

- Department of Commerce (Australia), 1932-1942
- Department of Commerce (Western Australia)
- Ohio Department of Commerce
- Oklahoma Department of Commerce
- West Virginia Department of Commerce
- Wisconsin Department of Commerce

== See also ==
- Ministry of Trade and Industry
