= 1999 Greek stock market crash =

The Greek stock market crash of 1999 (Greek: ελληνικό χρηματιστηριακό κραχ του 1999) was a sudden and sharp decline in the prices of most stocks on the Athens Stock Exchange (ATH), beginning in the fall of 1999 and continuing until the spring of 2003. This crash resulted in a significant drop in the total market capitalization of the Stock Exchange and a large reduction in nominal wealth for the majority of registered investors. The crash affected a large proportion of Greeks, as active investors had reached 1,5 million, and led to years of legal battles to find and punish potential culprits, hence becoming known widely as the "Stock Market Scandal", most of the accused were acquitted.

== The bubble ==
The rapid rise in stock prices on the Stock Market, also known as the "Stock market bubble" had started as early as 1997. As described by behavioral economics, economic bubbles are due to a combination of biases that lead to group recklessness and foolish behavior. In the case of the Greek stock market bubble of 1997–1999, a combination of economic factors, such as the lifting of many international restrictions on the movement of capital, the digital revolution and the internet, the reduction of deposit rates, Greece's entry into EMU, the hosting of the 2004 Olympic Games, the reduction of inflation, the improved fiscal picture of the country, created the impression of a significant improvement in the fundamental parameters of the Greek economy. Βy the summer of 1999, stock market activity had reached record levels. Even in small settlements services of reception and transmission of stock market orders, that functioned as brokerage offices for the purchase and sale of shares. It is estimated that over 1,300 companies were active on the Stock Exchange. Thus, the general index which was at 933 points in December 1996 reached an all-time high of 6,335 points on September 17, 1999 (an increase of 579%). The volume of daily transactions had exceeded 570 billion drachmas (1.8 billion euros), while the total capitalization of the Stock Exchange reached 212.8 billion euros, which corresponded to 182% of the GDP.

== Crash ==
The decline began on Monday, September 20, 1999, but was particularly felt from September 23 onwards, with the general index down 12.7% in 3 days and down more than 1,000 points in one week. The downward trend continued until March 2003, with the overall index falling to 1,467 points. The crash was fueled by the mass realization that there were stock-"bubbles" that had a high nominal value but no real value based on the company's economic activity.

A practice particularly widespread in stock trading is the exploitation of confidential information (insider trading). In this way, insiders with positive or negative information about a company can buy or sell its stock before that information is made public to profit financially. Some ways of exploiting confidential information are illegal in some countries. But at the time of the Greek stock market bubble, the institutional framework was porous and the supervisory mechanisms insufficient. In addition, there have always been various companies that signed contracts with the state to build projects or provide products and services. The prospect or announcement of such contracts was bound to lead to an increase in the share price of such companies, so the top executives of these companies and government officials who knew about such contracts in advance were in a privileged position and were able to exploit such insiders. information. Finally, the listing of a company's stock on the Stock Exchange required time-consuming bureaucratic procedures and this allowed people favored by the rulers to bypass the wait.

== Aftermath ==
The crash caused intense reactions, at a political and wider social level. There were even demonstrations outside the building of Stock Market. Leading officials of PASOK and the then Simitis government assured that the shocks in the Stock Exchange were temporary. Prime Minister Kostas Simitis declared in October 1999 to the Audit Office of PASOK that "in a couple of days the situation in the Stock Exchange will have been normalized", while the Minister of National Economy and Finance Giannos Papantoniou stated in April 2000, with the index already below 5,000 units, that "the period of nervousness in the stock market has an end date, it is April 9, it is the re-election of the PASOK. We, PASOK, are guarantors of the smooth running of the markets"

The case also took the path of law with an official judicial investigation that led to the control of 23 companies for stock manipulation. The case was delayed for a couple of years, which was aggravated by the involvement of the investigator in a prejudicial circuit. The Council of Misdemeanors finally decided in 2009 to refer 67 people to trial. On appeal, the defendants were reduced to 42. The appeals court unanimously acquitted all 42 defendants of fraud and money laundering in 2013. Following an application by the Supreme Court Prosecutor's Office, the Criminal Division of the Supreme Court overturned the acquittal in 2016. The second trial began in 2017 with only 36 defendants, as the other six had died. The Three-Member Court of Criminal Appeals tried the case in 2018, finally acquitting all the accused by a majority decision of 2 to 1. The Prosecutor of the seat appealed again, with the result that the case was referred to the Five-Member Court of Appeals of Athens, which, however, rejected the appeal as unjustified at the start of the procedure.
