= Ioannis Palaiokrassas =

Greek politician (1934–2021)

- Ιωάννης Παλαιοκρασσάς
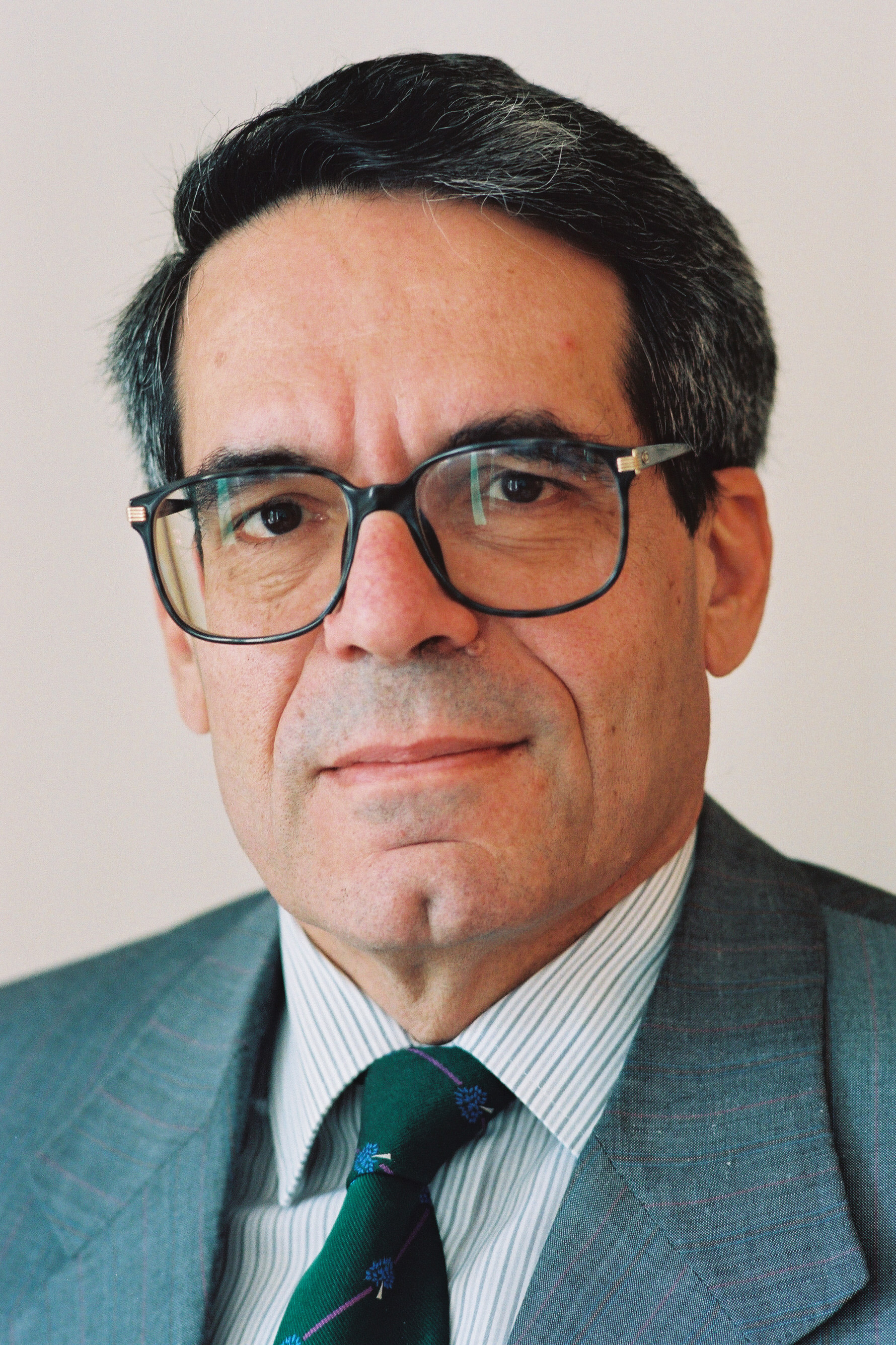
- Official portrait, 1993

European Commissioner for the Environment and Fisheries
- In office 1993–1995
- President: Jacques Delors
- Preceded by: Karel Van Miert
- Succeeded by: Ritt Bjerregaard

Personal details
- Born: 27 March 1934
- Died: 2 October 2021 (aged 87)
- Political party: New Democracy

Ioannis Palaiokrassas (Greek: Ιωάννης Παλαιοκρασσάς; 27 March 1934 – 2 October 2021) was a Greek politician.

He participated in the parliamentary committee that investigated Andreas Papandreou and his minister in the Koskotas scandal.

He was a Minister for Finance and a European Commissioner in the Delors Commission. On 14 July 1992 Palaiokrassas's car was the target of a rocket attack by November 17 in Central Athens. The attack missed its target, but killed a passer-by.

He was the chairman of the board at Logos University College.

On 2 October 2021, Palaiokrassas died at the age of 85.

Political offices
Preceded by Vasso Papandreou	Greek European Commissioner; 1993–1994	Succeeded by Christos Papoutsis
