= Minister of industry =

Descriptor for a cabinet member in charge of an economy's secondary sector

The minister of industry is a cabinet position in a government.

The title may refer to the head of the governmental department that specializes in industry. This position may also be responsible for trade and employment, areas that fall under the ministries of commerce and labour in some governments. Depending on the country, the industry minister may have a wide range of responsibilities that could include making decisions regarding utilities and electricity production, presiding over business mergers, and lobbying corporations to build facilities in their respective country.

In the United States, industry is the responsibility of the Secretary of Commerce, with an Under Secretary of Commerce for Industry and Security specifically tasked with executing policy regarding industry. In the United Kingdom, the minister of industry is called the Secretary of State for Business, Innovation and Skills, and bears the secondary title President of the Board of Trade.

== Country-related articles and lists ==
- Australia: Minister for Industry
- Azerbaijan: Minister of Economy
- Bangladesh: Minister of Industries (Bangladesh)
- Brazil: Ministry of Development, Industry and Foreign Trade (Brazil)
- Brunei: Ministry of Energy, Manpower and Industry
- Botswana: Ministry of Trade and Industry
- Canada: Minister of Industry
- People's Republic of China: Minister of Industry and Information Technology
- Colombia: Minister of Commerce, Industry and Tourism
- Czech Republic: Ministry of Industry and Trade
- Egypt: Minister of Industry and Foreign Trade
- European Union: European Commissioner for Industry and Entrepreneurship
- France: Minister of the Economy, Industry and Employment
- Ghana: Minister for Trade and Industry
- Iceland: Minister of Industry, Energy, and Tourism
- India: Minister of Commerce and Industry
- Indonesia: Minister of Industry
- Iran: Minister of Industries, Mine and Trade
- Iraq: Minister of Industry
- Ireland: Minister for Enterprise, Tourism and Employment
- Italy: Minister of Economic Development
- Israel: Industry, Trade and Labour Minister
- Japan: Minister of Economy, Trade and Industry
- Laos: Minister of Industry and Commerce
- Malaysia: Minister of International Trade and Industry
- Isle of Man: Minister of Trade and Industry
- Nepal: Minister of Industry, Commerce and Supplies
- New Zealand: Minister for Economic Development
- Norway: Minister of Trade and Industry
- Pakistan: Minister of Industry
- Philippines: Secretary of Trade and Industry
- Russia: Minister of Industry
- Singapore: Minister of Trade and Industry
- South Korea: Minister of Trade, Industry and Resources
- Spain: Minister of Industry, Trade, and Tourism
- Sweden: Minister of Industry
- Syria: Ministry of Economy and Industry
- Tanzania: Minister of Industry and Trade
- Thailand: Minister of Industry
- Turkey: Minister of Industry and Commerce
- United Kingdom: Secretary of State for Business, Innovation and Skills
- United States: Secretary of Commerce
  - Under Secretary of Commerce for Industry and Security
- Vietnam: Minister of Industry and Trade
- Zimbabwe: Minister of Industry and Commerce
- Saudi Arabia: Ministry of Industry and Mineral Resources

== See also ==
- Ministry of Commerce (including Ministry of Industry)
- Commerce minister
