= Commerce minister =

A commerce minister (sometimes business minister, trade minister or international trade minister) is a position in many governments that is responsible for regulating external trade and promoting economic growth (commercial policy). In many countries, this role is separate from a finance minister, who has more budgetary responsibilities.

== List ==
Notable examples are:

- Afghanistan: Ministry of Commerce and Industry (Afghanistan)
- Australia: Minister for Trade and Tourism
- Canada: Minister of International Trade
- China: Minister of Commerce
- Denmark: Minister of Business Affairs
- (European Union) : Commissioner for Trade and Economic Security
- Finland: Minister of Trade and Industry
- France: Minister of Commerce (France)
- Hong Kong: Secretary for Commerce and Economic Development
- Iceland: Minister of Commerce (Iceland)
- India: Minister of Commerce and Industry
- Iran: Minister for Commerce reestablished 2022
- Ireland: Minister for Enterprise, Tourism and Employment
- Israel: Ministry of Economy (Israel)
- Italy: Minister of Economy and Finance
- Nepal: Minister of Industry, Commerce and Supplies
- New Zealand: Minister of Commerce and Consumer Affairs
- North Korea: Minister of Commerce
- Norway: Minister of Trade and Shipping
- Philippines: Secretary of Trade and Industry
- Romania: Minister of Economy, Commerce and Business Environment (Romania)
- South Africa: Minister of Trade, Industry and Competition
- Tonga: Minister for Labour, Commerce and Industries (Tonga)
- United Kingdom: Secretary of State for Business, Innovation, Science and Trade
  - Minister of State for Trade
  - Northern Ireland:
    - Minister for the Economy
    - Minister of Commerce (Northern Ireland)
- United States: Secretary of Commerce
  - Oklahoma: Executive Director of the Commerce Department
- Vietnam: Minister of Industry and Trade

== See also ==
- Ministry of Trade and Industry
- Minister of industry
