= Vasso Papandreou =

Greek politician and economist (1944–2024)

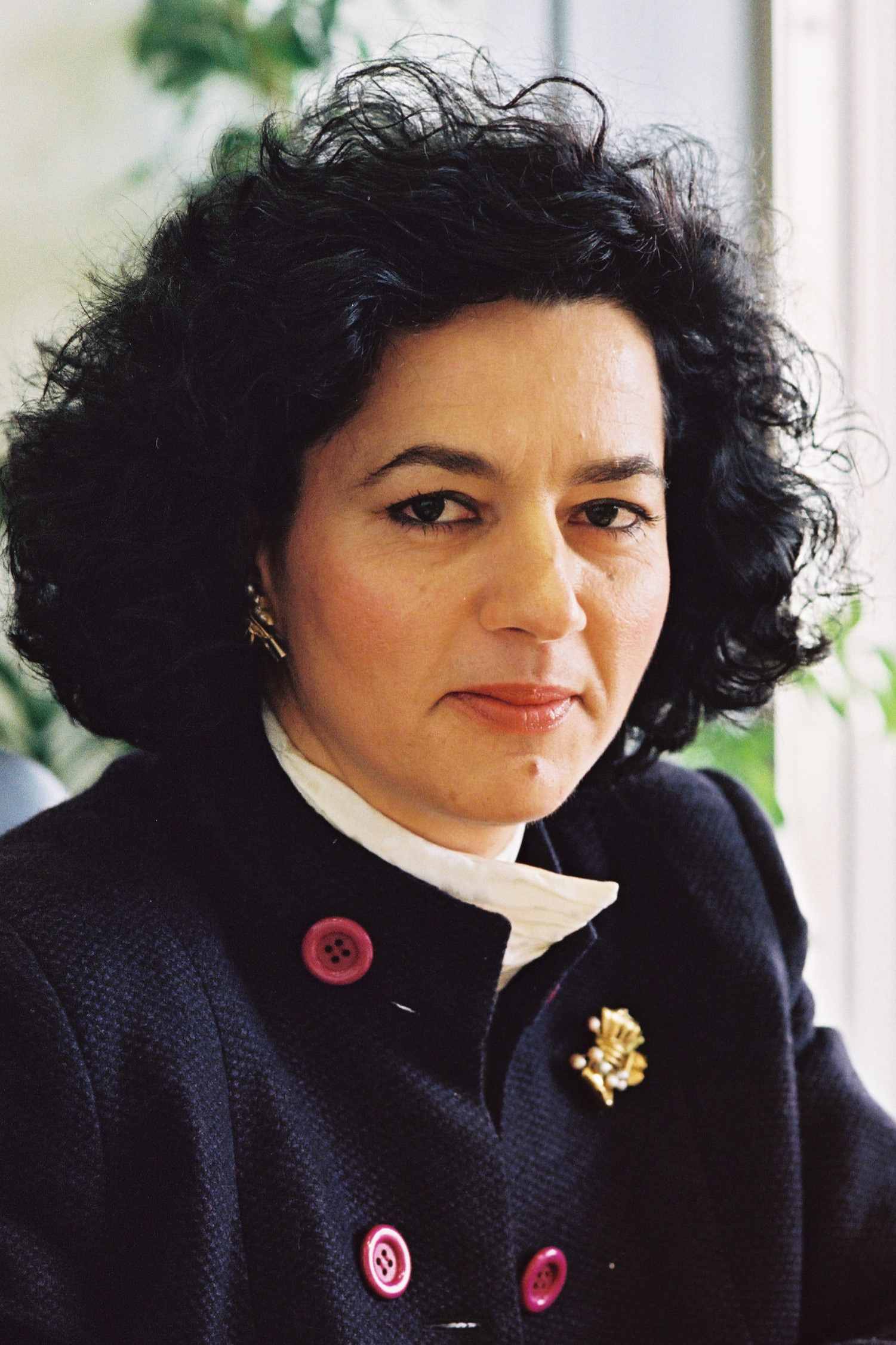
- Papandréou in 1990

Minister of the Environment, Spatial Planning and Public Works
- In office 24 October 2001 – 10 March 2004
- Prime Minister: Costas Simitis
- Preceded by: Kostas Laliotis
- Succeeded by: Georgios Souflias

Minister of the Interior, Public Administration and Decentralization
- In office 19 February 1999 – 20 March 2000
- Prime Minister: Costas Simitis
- Preceded by: Alekos Papadopoulos
- Succeeded by: Georgios Koumantos

Minister of Development
- In office 1 February 1996 – 19 February 1999
- Prime Minister: Costas Simitis
- Preceded by: Ministry created
- Succeeded by: Evangelos Venizelos

European Commissioner for Employment, Social Affairs and Equal Opportunities
- In office 1989–1992
- President: Jacques Delors
- Preceded by: Peter Sutherland
- Succeeded by: Pádraig Flynn

Member of the Hellenic Parliament for Athens B
- In office 10 October 1993 – 11 April 2012

Member of the Hellenic Parliament for National list
- In office 2 June 1985 – 14 January 1989

Personal details
- Born: 9 December 1944 Valimitika, Kingdom of Greece
- Died: 17 October 2024 (aged 79) Chalandri, Athens, Greece
- Resting place: Valimitika Cemetery
- Party: PASOK

Vasso Papandreou (Greek: Βάσω Παπανδρέου; 9 December 1944 – 17 October 2024) was a Greek politician. After being in exile during the rule of the Greek junta, she returned to Greece in 1974 and was a founding member of PASOK. In 1981, she was awarded a PhD in economics from the University of Reading.

She was a member of PASOK's Central Committee until 1988, and served as Deputy Minister of Industry, Energy and Technology from 1986 to 1987 and as Deputy Minister of Commerce in 1988.

In 1989, she was appointed Greece's European Commissioner, taking the post of Commissioner for Employment, industrial relations and social affairs in the second Delors Commission. After her term on the commission, she returned to Greek domestic politics and was elected to the Hellenic Parliament in the 1993, 1996, 2000 elections, 2004, 2007 and 2009 elections. She served in all Costas Simitis government (1996–2004) as Minister of Economic Development (1996–1999), Minister of Interior (1999–2001) and Minister for the Environment, Physical Planning and Public Works from 2001 to 2004.

She is unrelated to the Papandreou political family.

== Early life ==
Vasso Papandreou was born in Valimitika, Aigio, on 9 December 1944. She studied economics at the Athens University of Economics and Business (then ASOEE), and continued her studies in the United Kingdom, where she obtained a master's degree from the University of London and a PhD from the University of Reading. She later taught at Oxford University.

== Political career ==
She served as President of EOMMEX (1981–1985), Deputy Minister of Industry, Energy and Technology (1985–1986), Deputy Minister of Industry, Energy and Technology (1986–1987), Deputy Minister of Commerce responsible for Greek Presidency issues in the European Community (1988–1989), European Commissioner for Employment, Labour Relations and Social Affairs, Human Resources, Education and Training, and Gender Equality (1989–1993), Minister of Development (1996–1999), Minister of Interior, Public Administration, and Decentralization (1999–2001), and Minister for the Environment, Spatial Planning, and Public Works (2001–2004) in PASOK governments.

In the 1993 elections, she received 256,831 preference votes in the Athens B electoral district, a number that has not been surpassed by anyone to date.

Throughout her career, she promoted new educational opportunities, protected workers' rights, supported motherhood, and championed gender equality. She paid particular attention to retirees and individuals with special needs. She advanced the European Social Charter and secured Social Dialogue across Europe. Her impact reached international recognition, with the press referring to her as the "Caryatid of Democracy" and the "Iron Lady". Through her initiative, the legal framework was established to ensure 33% female participation in the candidate lists for the 2002 regional and municipal elections.

Significant moments in her political career:

- 1974: Founding member of PASOK and member of its Central Committee.
- 1981–1985: President of EOMMEX.
- 1982–1985: Member of the Board of Directors of Commercial Bank of Greece.
- 1984–1988: Member of the Executive Bureau of PASOK's Central Committee.
- 1985–1986: Deputy Minister of Industry, Energy and Technology.
- 1985–1989 and 1993–2012: PASOK MP.
- 1986–1987: Deputy Minister of Industry, Energy and Technology.
- 1988–1989: Deputy Minister of Commerce (responsible for Greek Presidency in the European Community).
- 1989–1993: Member of the European Commission (first female Commissioner) responsible for Employment, Labour Relations, Social Affairs, Human Resources, Education and Training, and Gender Equality.
- 1993–1996: Head of the Greek Parliamentary Delegation to the Parliamentary Assembly of the Western European Union.
- 1993–1996: Head of the Greek Parliamentary Delegation to the Parliamentary Assembly of the Council of Europe.
- 1995–1996: Vice-president of the Parliamentary Assembly of the Council of Europe.
- 1995–1996: Vice-president of the Parliamentary Assembly of the Western European Union.
- 1996–1999: Minister of Development (Minister of Industry, Energy and Technology for the first month of 1996).
- 1996–2004: Member of PASOK's Executive Bureau.
- 1999–2001: Minister of Interior, Public Administration, and Decentralization.
- 2001–2004: Minister of Environment, Spatial Planning, and Public Works.
- 2004–2007: Member of the Bureau of the Party of European Socialists.
- 2005–2007: Member of PASOK's Political Council. Responsible for the Economy sector.
- 2008–2009: Responsible for PASOK's Defense sector.
- 2009–2012: Chairwoman of the Economic Affairs Committee of the Greek Parliament.

== Personal life and death ==
Papandreou never married and had no children. In the 1970s, she had an affair with Andreas Papandreou. Despite their separation, they had good relations until their rupture in 1995, when she challenged him politically given his fragile health. In November of the same year, Andreas Papandreou fell seriously ill and was hospitalized for months, where he resigned as prime minister and a few months after his discharge, in June 1996, he died.

Vasso Papandreou died at her residence in Chalandri on 17 October 2024, at the age of 80. Her funeral was held on October 19, at the cemetery of her birthplace, in the presence of many politicians mainly from PASOK.
