= Ministry of Industry and Mines =

Government ministry of Algeria

- Ministère de l'Industrie et des Mines

Agency overview
- Jurisdiction: Algeria
- Headquarters: Algiers
- Child agency: Algerian Investment Promotion Agency (AAPI)

Ministry of Industry and Mines (French: Ministère de l'Industrie et des Mines) is a government ministry of Algeria.

Subordinate under it is the National Agency of Investment Development (French: Agence Nationale de Développement de l’Investissement, ANDIm Arabic: الوكالة الوطنية لتطوير الاستثمار). It was established in 1993 as the Agency of Promotion, Support and Follow-up of Investment (French: Agence de Promotion, de Soutien et de Suivi de l’Investissement, APSI; Arabic: وكالة ترقية و دعم و متابعة الاستثمار) and received its current name in 2001.
