= Panagiotis Roumeliotis =

Greek economist, academic, banker and politician

Panagiotis "Takis" Roumeliotis (Greek: Παναγιώτης Ρουμελιώτης, born 19 August 1947), is a Greek economist, academic, banker and politician. A friend and advisor of Andreas Papandreou, he has served as Minister of National Economy, Minister of Commerce, Member of the European Parliament for PASOK and as Greece's representative at the International Monetary Fund. Since December 2011, he has been Vice Chairman of Piraeus Bank, Greece's largest.

== Biography ==
He was born in 1947 in Suez, Egypt, the son of a Greek businessman established there. He graduated with a degree in economics from the French School for Advanced Studies in the Social Sciences (École des hautes études en sciences sociales), and later received a PhD in economics from Pantheon-Sorbonne University, also in France.

He has taught economics at various universities in France and Greece. He has also been president of the French think tank IPEMED (Institut de prospective économique du monde méditerranéen).

His political career began in 1978, when he became an economic advisor to Andreas Papandreou. After Papandreou became Greece's Prime Minister in 1981, Roumeliotis served, successively, as:

- October – December 1981: General Secretary of the Ministry of Coordination
- December 1981 – July 1982: Deputy Minister of Coordination
- July 1982 – September 1983: Deputy Minister of Finance
- April 1984 – February 1987: Deputy Minister of National Economy
- February – November 1987: Minister of Commerce
- November 1987 – July 1989: Minister of National Economy

In 1989, he was indicted along with Prime Minister Andreas Papandreou and three other ministers for the Koskotas scandal.

He was Greece's representative at the International Monetary Fund (IMF).
