= Anastasios Peponis =

Greek politician and author (1924-2011)

Anastasios Peponis (Greek: Αναστάσιος Πεπονής; 1924 – 8 August 2011) was a Greek politician and author.

== Life ==
He was born in 1924 in Athens, Greece. During the Axis Occupation of Greece in the Second World War (1941–44), Peponis was an active member of two resistance organizations: the Panhellenic Union of Fighting Youths (PEAN) and the National Coalition of Higher Education Institutions (ESAS), being involved especially in the underground press.

After the war he studied law, and began practice in 1952. In 1951–52, during his studies, he was leader of the Youth Section of the National Progressive Center Union (EPEK). As the general director of the Hellenic Broadcasting Corporation in 1964-65 he founded the Experimental Channel which began Greek public television. During the Greek military junta of 1967–1974 he was arrested five times, imprisoned, held in solitary confinement, and ordered into exile.

After the junta's fall, he became a member of the Panhellenic Socialist Movement (PASOK). From 1977 to 2000 he was elected with PASOK as a member of the Hellenic Parliament for Athens. After the accession of Greece to the EEC on January 1, 1981, he became a provisional member of the European Parliament representing Greece until the country could hold its first European Parliament elections. In successive PASOK cabinets he held the portfolios of Industry and Energy (1981–82), Industry, Energy and Research (1986–89, 1989–90 and 1995). He was Minister without portfolio in 1984, Minister to the Presidency of the Government in 1989 and in 1993–94, Minister for Justice in 1995, and Minister for Health and Welfare in 1996. In 1985–86, as MP he acted as the chief sponsor for the revision of the Greek Constitution. The proposed amendments were designed to increase the powers of the prime minister by removing the reserved powers of the president, and they had caused constitutional crisis.

As the minister responsible for energy policy he conceived of, negotiated and signed an agreement on importing natural gas to Greece from the then-Soviet Union and Algeria and started its realization in 1987–88. In the same capacity, he proposed and oversaw a strategy for disengaging foreign companies searching for oil in the northern Aegean from issues of national security and international policy.

As Minister for Public Administration he introduced and secured passage for Law 2190/94 establishing the Supreme Council for Personnel Selection (ASEP) and the system of public hiring by means of objective criteria.

Peponis died on 8 August 2011. He was 87.

== Publications ==
His books include: Personal Testimony (Athens 1970 and 2001), Wider Communication (on Mass Media; Athens 1973), On Popular Sovereignty (Athens 1975), The Constitutional Revision of 1985/86 (Athens 1986), Greece and Democracy in a New Reality (Athens 1996), 1961-81: Persons and Events (Athens 2001), On the Issue of the Aegean Sea: Oil, “Boundary Disputes,” the European Union and the Energy Connection (Athens 2008).
