= List of political families in Greece =

This article lists political families of Greece where two or more members of that family have been members or ministers of the Hellenic Parliament, the Greek Senate or of the European Parliament.

For the purposes of this list, a "family" has been defined as a group of people where each person has one of the following relationships to at least one of the other people listed:

- son, daughter, grandson or granddaughter
- father, mother, grandfather or grandmother
- nephew, niece, grandnephew or grandniece
- uncle, aunt, great uncle or great aunt
- sibling and first cousin
- spouse (husband or wife)
- connected by marriage ("-in-law" relationships)

The list has been indexed against the name of the first family member to enter one of the bodies mentioned above.

== History ==
Political dynasties have long been a feature of the Greek political landscape. They are typically characterized as families that have established their political careers usually starting from local politics and gradually moving upwards to national government or other positions of national politics. Political dynasties usually have a strong, consolidated support base, and this background and the personalities of individual members are often as important as the political positions and parties they represent. Members of such dynasties usually do not limit their involvement to political activities, and may participate in business or cultural activities. There have also been intermarriages between the political families as well.

Political dynasties started emerging in the 19th century after the Greek War of Independence and the independence of Greece. However, political dynasties became a prominent feature in Greek politics from the 20th century onwards. Among the many Greek political dynasties, the most prominent have been the Venizelos, Karamanlis, Papandreou and Mitsotakis/Bakoyannis families.

== A ==
- Konstantinos Alavanos (1872–1958): Liberal Party MP ca. 1915–1936
  - his son Nikolaos Alavanos (1913–1992): Progressive Party MP 1961–64, Centre Union MP 1964–67, Centre Union–New Forces MP 1974–77, Union of the Democratic Centre MP 1976–77
    - his son Konstantinos N. Alavanos (born 1946): Centre Union–New Forces MP 1974–76, Union of the Democratic Centre MP 1976–81
    - his son Alekos Alavanos (born 1950): Syriza MP 2004–09, leader of Synaspismos 2004–08
      - his nephew Lefteris Nikolaou-Alavanos (born 1985): Communist Party of Greece, Member of the European Parliament 2019-
- Gerasimos Arsenis (1931–2016): PASOK MP and Minister for National Economy 1982–85, Economics 1984–85, Mercantile Marine 1985, Defence 1993–96, and Education 1996–2000
  - his wife Louka Katseli, (born 1952): PASOK MP and Minister for the Economy, Competitiveness and Shipping (2009–10) and Minister for Labour and Social Security (2010–11).

== D ==
- Stavros Dimas (born 1941): New Democracy MP (1977–2004) and minister for trade 1980–1981, agriculture 1989–1990, industry, energy and technology 1990–1991, Greek European commissioner 2004–2010, and Minister for Foreign Affairs 2011–2012
  - his son Christos Dimas (born 1980): New Democracy MP (2012-)

== F ==
- Theodore Flogaitis: elected first mayor of Odessa in 1796
  - his son Nicolas Flogaitis: Greek supreme court judge
    - his son Theodore Flogaitis (died 1905): professor of constitutional law
    - his son Ioannis Flogaitis (1906-?): lawyer and politician on Lefkada
      - his son Spyridon Flogaitis (born 1950): professor of public law at the University of Athens, interim Minister of the Interior 2007 and 2009
      - his daughter-in-law Photini Pazartzis: professor of international law at the University of Athens

== G ==
- Georgios Gennimatas (1939–1994): PASOK MP and Minister for the Interior 1981–84, Health 1984–87, Labour (1987–89) and National Economy (1989, 1993–94)
  - his daughter Fofi Gennimata (1964–2021): PASOK MP and super-prefect for Athens and Piraeus 2003–09, Deputy Minister for Health 2009–10 and Education 2010–11, Deputy Minister of the Interior 2011–12, PASOK president 2015–2021

== K ==
- Konstantinos Kanaris (ca. 1790–1877): hero of the Greek War of Independence, admiral and Prime Minister 1844, 1848–49, 1864, 1864–65 and 1877
  - his son Nikolaos Kanaris (1818–1848): diplomat and MP
  - his son Miltiadis Kanaris (1822–1901): admiral, minister and MP
    - his son Epaminondas Kanaris: MP
    - his son Alexandros Kanaris (1864–1944): minister and MP
  - his son Lykourgos Kanaris (1826–1865): naval officer and lawyer
    - his son Napoleon Kanaris: MP
  - his son Aristeidis Kanaris (1831–1863): army officer
    - his son Themistoklis Kanaris: consul, MP and collaborator of Charilaos Trikoupis
    - his son Ioannis Kanaris: MP
- Andreas Karagounis (1943–2012): New Democracy MP for Aetolia-Acarnania 1989–2000, 2004–2009
  - his son Kostas Karagounis (born 1975): New Democracy MP for Aetolia-Acarnania 2009–, ND party spokesman Jan–Oct 2015
- Konstantinos Karamanlis (1907–1998): Greek Rally MP, founder of National Radical Union, Prime Minister 1955–63 and 1974–80, President of the Republic 1980–85 and 1990–95
  - his brother Achilleas Karamanlis (born 1929): New Democracy MP for Serres 1974–2009 and cabinet minister
    - his son Kostas A. Karamanlis (born 1974): New Democracy MP for Serres 2015–
  - his nephew Kostas Karamanlis (born 1956): New Democracy MP, Prime Minister 2004–09 (Kostas Karamanlis' father Alekos was Konstantinos Karamanlis' brother)
  - his nephew Michalis Liapis, New Democracy MP and Minister for Transport (2004–07) and Culture (2007–09) (Liapis' mother Antigoni was Konstantinos Karamanlis' sister)
- Ioannis Kefalogiannis (1933–2012): National Radical Union and New Democracy MP and cabinet minister
  - his daughter Olga Kefalogianni: New Democracy MP and cabinet minister
- Nikos Konstantopoulos (born 1942): Minister of the Interior 1989, MP for Synaspismos 1990–93 and 1996–2007, leader of Synaspismos 1993–2004
  - his daughter Zoe Konstantopoulou (born 1976): Syriza MP 2012–15, Parliamentary Speaker 2015
- Diomidis Kyriakos (1811–1869): Prime Minister 1863
  - his grandson Alexandros Diomidis-Kyriakos (1875–1950): Prime Minister 1949–50
- Michail Kyrkos (1893–1967): MP for the Liberal Party, Progressive Party, People's Party and the United Democratic Left.
  - his son Leonidas Kyrkos (1924–2011), MP for the United Democratic Left, MP and MEP for the Communist Party of Greece (Interior), MP for the Coalition of the Left and Progress.
    - his son Miltiadis Kyrkos (born 1959), MEP for Potami (2014–2019)

== M ==
- Vassilios Meimarakis (1884–1961): People's Party MP for Heraklion 1926–28, 1932–33 and 1936.
  - his nephew Ioannis Meimarkis: National Radical Union MP for Heraklion 1963–64
    - his son Evangelos Meimarkis: New Democracy MP for Athens B, 1989–, Minister for Defence 2006–09, Parliamentary Speaker 2012–15, New Democracy leader 2015
- Konstantinos Mitsotakis (1918–2017): Liberal Party, Centre Union and New Democracy MP, cabinet minister 1978–81, Prime Minister 1990–93
  - his son-in-law Pavlos Bakoyannis (1935–1989): New Democracy MP, assassinated by 17N
  - his daughter Dora Bakoyannis (born 1954): New Democracy MP, cabinet minister 1992–93 and 2006–09, Mayor of Athens 2003–06
    - her son Kostas Bakoyannis (born 1978): Regional governor of Central Greece and Mayor of Athens
  - his son Kyriakos Mitsotakis (born 1968): New Democracy MP, Prime Minister 2019-
  - his niece Antigone Lyberaki (born 1959): MP with Potami 2015

== P ==
- Michalis Papakonstantinou (1919–2010): Centre Union MP 1961–1967, New Democracy MP, 1977-1990s
  - his nephew Giorgos Papakonstantinou (born 1961): PASOK MP for Kozani, 2007–2009; MEP 2009; cabinet minister 2009–11
- Georgios Papandreou (1888–1968): Prime Minister 1944–45, 1963, 1964–65
  - his son Andreas Papandreou (1919–1996): founder of the Panhellenic Socialist Movement (PASOK), Prime Minister 1981–89, 1993–96
    - his son George Papandreou (born 1952): several cabinet posts incl. Foreign Minister 1999–2004, Prime Minister 2009–11
- Savvas Papapolitis (1911–1973): National Progressive Center Union MP for Piraeus, 1951–56, Liberal Democratic Union 1956–58, Centre Union 1961–67; Trade Minister 1951–52, 1963
  - his son Sotiris Papapolitis (born 1942): Piraeus MP for Centre Union–New Forces MP 1974–76, Union of the Democratic Centre 1976–77, New Democracy 1981–89, 90–93

== R ==
- Dimitrios Rallis (1844–1921): Prime Minister 1897, 1903, 1905, 1909 and 1920–21
  - his son Ioannis Rallis (1878–1946): Prime Minister 1943-44 (during the Axis Occupation of Greece)
    - his son Georgios Rallis (1918–2006): Prime Minister 1980–81

== S ==
- Dimitrios Stephanopoulos (1885–1973): MP for Achaea (1920–22, 1926–28, 1932–35), Minister for Market Regulations (1935), Minister for Supplies (1946)
  - his son Konstantinos Stephanopoulos (1926–2016): MP for Achaea the National Radical Union (1964–67), New Democracy in Achaea (1974–89) and Democratic Renewal in Athens (1989); President of Greece (1995–2005)

== T ==
- Georgios Theotokis (1844–1916): Prime Minister 1899–1901, 1903 and 1903–04 and 1905–09
  - his son Ioannis Theotokis (1880–1961): Prime Minister 1950 (caretaker).
    - his nephew Georgios Rallis (see above)
- Spyridon Trikoupis (1788–1873): Prime Minister 1833, ambassador to London 1835–1838, 1841–1843 and 1850–1861
  - his son Charilaos Trikoupis (1832–1896): Prime Minister 1875, 1878, 1880, 1882–85, 1886–90, 1892–93 and 1893–95
- Panagis Tsaldaris (1868–1936): Prime Minister 1932–33 and 1933–35
  - his nephew Konstantinos Tsaldaris: Prime Minister 1946–47 and 1947
- Georgios Tzitzikostas (1941–2000): New Democracy MP for Thessaloniki/Thessaloniki B 1974–2000, Minister for Macedonia-Thrace 1990–91
  - his son Apostolos Tzitzikostas (born 1978): New Democracy MP for Thessaloniki A 2007–09, Regional Governor of Central Macedonia 2013–

== V ==
- Miltiadis Varvitsiotis (died 1960): People's Party MP for Athens 1946–1950
  - his son Ioannis Varvitsiotis (born 1933): National Radical Union and New Democracy MP, Minister for Commerce (1975–1977), Education (1977–1980), National Defence (1989, 1990–1993), Vice President of the European People's Party and of New Democracy.
    - his son Miltiadis Varvitsiotis (born 1969): New Democracy MP
- Eleftherios Venizelos (1864–1936): prominent leader in the Cretan State, founder of the Liberal Party, Prime Minister 1910–15, 1917–20, 1924, 1928–32 and 1933
  - his son Sophoklis Venizelos (1894–1964), Liberal Party and Centre Union MP, Prime Minister 1944, 1950 and 1950–51
    - his son Nikitas Venizelos, MP for Chania, vice-speaker of the Greek Parliament
  - his nephew Kyriakos Mitsotakis, MP
    - his son Konstantinos Mitsotakis (see above)

== Z ==
- Thrasyvoulos Zaimis (1825–1889): Prime Minister 1869–70 and 1871
  - his son Alexandros Zaimis (1855–1936): Prime Minister 1897–99, 1901–02, 1915, 1916, 1917, 1926–1928, President of Greece 1929–35
