= Flogaitis =

Flogaitis is a surname. Notable people with the surname include:

- Spyridon Flogaitis
- Theodoros Flogaitis
