= Xydakis =

Xydakis (Greek: Ξυδάκης) is a Greek surname. It is the surname of:

- Nikos Xydakis (born 1952), a Greek composer, pianist, and singer
- Nikos Xydakis (born 1958), former editor in chief of Kathimerini and current Alternate Minister of Culture of Greece
