= Nikos Xydakis =

Nikos Xydakis may refer to:

- Nikos Xydakis (musician) (born 1952), Greek composer, pianist, and singer
- Nikos Xydakis (journalist) (born 1958), former editor in chief of Kathimerini and current Alternate Minister of European Affairs of Greece
