= Nepotism =

Favoritism granted to relatives

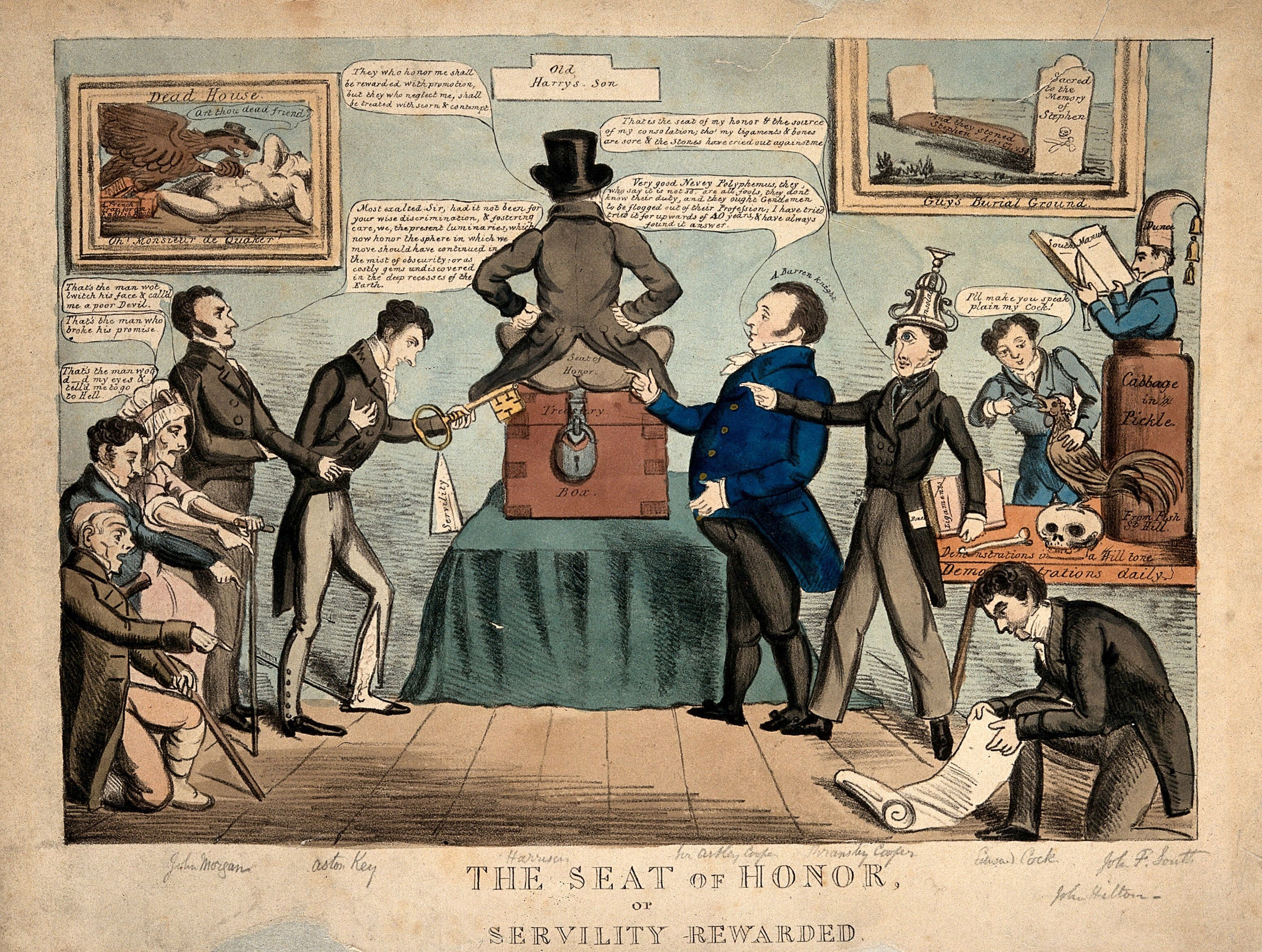
Benjamin Harrison, treasurer of Guy's Hospital in London, was shown as a dominant presiding figure, with the nepotism of Sir Astley Cooper having his tacit approval.

Nepotism is the act of granting an advantage, privilege, or position to close friends or relatives in an occupation or field. These fields can include retail, business, finance and accounting, politics, journalism, law, academia, entertainment, sports, religion, health care, and social work. In concept, it is similar to cronyism. Sociologists argue it to be a form of cultural capital to success.

The term originated with the assignment of nephews, sons, or other relatives to important positions by Catholic popes and bishops. Nepotism has been criticized since ancient history by philosophers, including Aristotle, Valluvar, and Confucius, condemning it as both evil and unwise.

== Origins ==
The term comes from the Italian word nepotismo, which is based on the Latin root nepos meaning nephew. Since the Middle Ages and until the late 17th century, some Catholic popes and bishops – who had taken vows of celibacy and, therefore, usually had no legitimate offspring of their own – gave their nephews such positions of preference as were often accorded by fathers to sons. They would also do the same with children who were the illegitimate result of broken celibacy vows, and who were claimed to be "nephews" instead of sons.

Several popes elevated nephews and other relatives to the cardinalate. Often, such appointments were a means of continuing a papal "dynasty". For instance, Pope Callixtus III, head of the Borgia family, made two of his nephews cardinals; one of them, Rodrigo, later used his position as a cardinal as a stepping stone to the papacy, becoming Pope Alexander VI. Alexander then elevated Alessandro Farnese, his mistress's brother, to cardinal; Farnese would later go on to become Pope Paul III. Paul III also engaged in nepotism, appointing, for instance, two illegitimate grandsons, aged 14 and 16, as cardinals. The practice was finally limited when Pope Innocent XII issued the bull Romanum decet Pontificem in 1692. The papal bull prohibited popes in all times from bestowing estates, offices, or revenues on any relative, with the exception that one qualified relative (at most) could be made a cardinal.

=== Mention in ancient literature ===
In the second book of the Kural literature from over 1,000 years ago, which formed a manual for governments and corporations in what is now India, philosopher Valluvar condemned favoritism as both evil and unwise:

If you choose an unfit person for your job just because you love and you like him, he will lead you to endless follies.

== Types ==
=== Political ===
Nepotism is a common accusation in politics when the relative of a powerful figure ascends to similar power seemingly without appropriate qualifications. The British English expression "Bob's your uncle" is thought to have originated when Robert Arthur Talbot Gascoyne-Cecil, 3rd Marquess of Salisbury, promoted his nephew, Arthur Balfour, to the esteemed post of Chief Secretary for Ireland, which was widely seen as an act of nepotism.

=== Economic ===
Inheritance has been viewed by some as a form of nepotism.

=== Organizational ===
Nepotism in organizations leads to monopolization of power because when members involved in institutional decision-making are related, decisions made within institutions risk favoring a group of closely connected people.

Nepotism can also occur within organizations, when a person is employed due to their familial ties. It is generally seen as unethical, both on the part of the employer and employee. One of the consequences of nepotism in an organization is the creation of a limitation in the organization's network of contacts, reducing the opportunities for negotiation with other social circles, which can lead to a reduction in the success and duration of organizations in the long term.

==== In employment ====
Nepotism at work can mean increased opportunity at a job, attaining a job or being paid more than other similarly situated people. Arguments are made both for and against employment granted due to a family connection, which is most common in small, family-run businesses. On one hand, nepotism can provide stability and continuity. Critics cite studies that demonstrate decreased morale and commitment from non-related employees, and a generally negative attitude towards superior positions filled through nepotism. A 2026 survey conducted by Kickresume of more than 1,000 respondents found that 61% of workers said they would have greater trust in their managers if promotions were based entirely on merit. An article from Forbes magazine stated, "there is no ladder to climb when the top rung is reserved for people with a certain name." Employing intimate people favors perpetuating the ideas or goals of those who employ them, knowing that the people around them will hold them. However, it can lead to a lack of competent staff or a reduction in productivity because even if the employees are not the best options for their functions, they will be protected by those who employ them.

==== In entertainment ====
Outside of national politics, accusations of "nepotism" are made in instances of prima facie favoritism to relatives.

- Peaches Geldof's role as magazine editor in an MTV reality show – produced by a company owned by her father Bob Geldof
- Tori Spelling being cast on the TV series Beverly Hills, 90210 as a result of her father, Aaron Spelling's, involvement with the show.
- Hollywood's Coppola family includes many distinguished filmmakers and actors. The careers of Sofia Coppola, Nicolas Cage, and Jason Schwartzman have been attributed to the aid of director Francis Ford Coppola who are Francis's daughter and nephews, respectively. He cast his daughter Sofia in The Godfather Part III. Cage changed his last name from Coppola to distance himself from his family professionally and minimize charges of favoritism.
- Ben Platt's role as high schooler Evan Hansen in the 2021 film adaptation of the musical Dear Evan Hansen as a result of his winning the Tony Award for Best Actor in a Musical for originating the role on Broadway in 2016, as well as the involvement of his father, Marc Platt, as one of the film's producers. The latter was never involved in the producing team of the stage version. The casting sparked controversy due to Ben Platt being ten years older than his character at the time of filming, resulting in critics and viewers deeming him too old to reprise his role. He would go on to be nominated for two Golden Raspberry Awards, including Worst Actor, for his performance.
- New York magazine's December 2022 cover (calling 2022 'The Year of the Nepo Baby') featured notable celebrities (Maude Apatow, Lily-Rose Depp, Maya Hawke, Dakota Johnson, Ben Platt, Jack Quaid, Zoë Kravitz, and John David Washington) whose career successes have been achieved through nepotism.

==== In sports ====
- Thanasis Antetokounmpo has been labeled the beneficiary of nepotism due to his brother being Giannis Antetokounmpo, even though his play is deemed by some to not be good enough for him to occupy a roster spot on the Milwaukee Bucks.
- The Los Angeles Lakers encountered allegations of nepotism when they selected Bronny James, the son of LeBron James, in the 2024 NBA draft. Although other NBA prospects exemplified greater promise, experts questioned Bronny's NBA readiness due to his lackluster performance during his only NCAA season. Reports revealed that LeBron's agent, Rich Paul, actively discouraged other teams from drafting Bronny, even going so far as to suggest that he might play overseas if selected.

==== In academia ====
Nepotism is found in academia, where it is common for professors to have their partners, and sometimes children, hired by the same faculty in which they work. In the second half of the 20th century, in the United States at least, this was far less frequent as universities typically held very strict anti-nepotism policies. Countries with high levels of corruption and higher education systems with low competition between universities generally have higher levels of corruption in academia. Italy has been noted for having particularly high levels of nepotism in its academic system, when compared to other developed nations. Nepotism is often praised for favoring female employment in academia.

== Selected examples by country ==
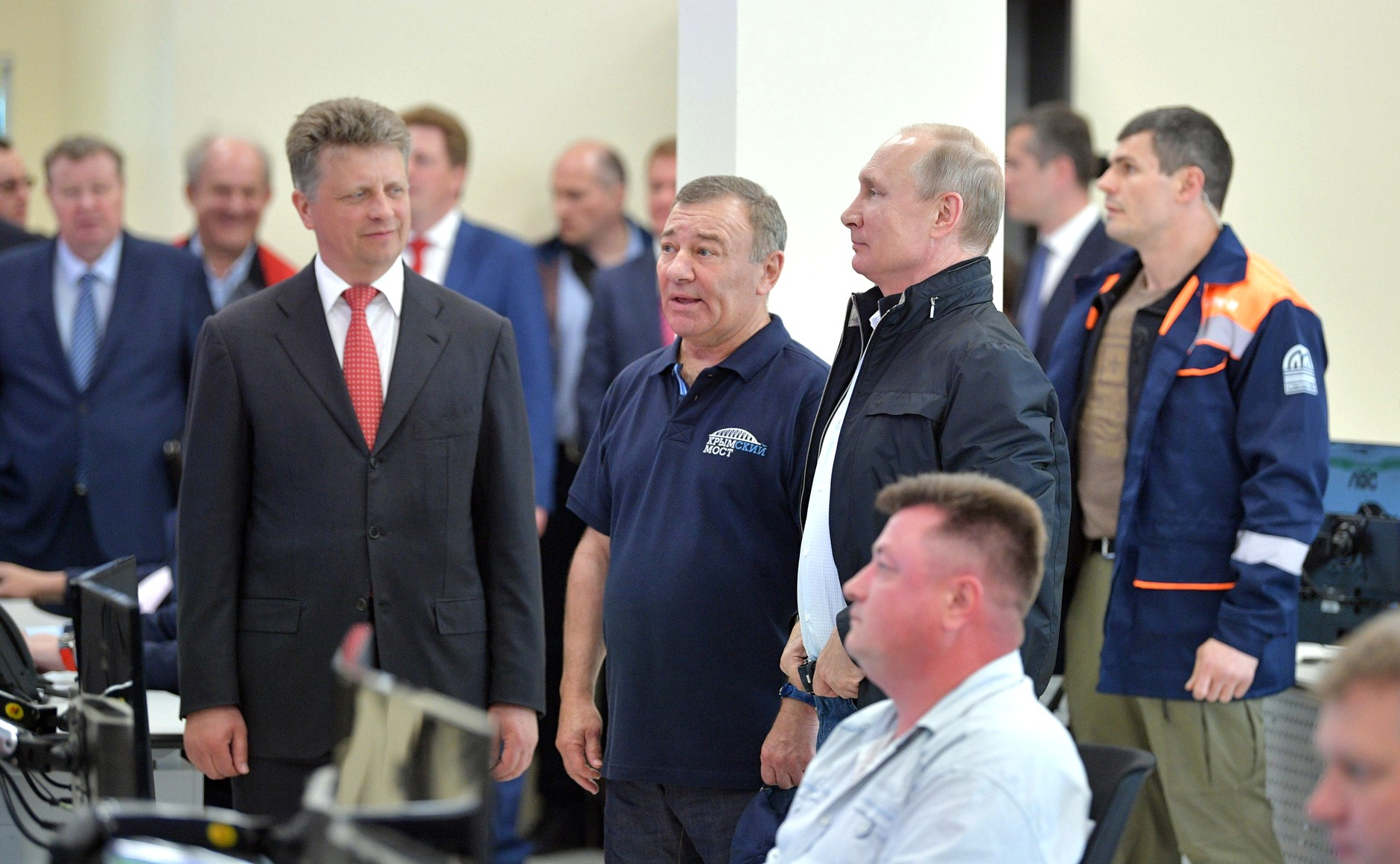
Vladimir Putin's childhood friend Arkady Rotenberg is one of the richest people in Russia.

=== Argentina ===
In Argentina, nepotism is a common practice. Although there have been various attempts at reducing it, it is difficult in a country where state jobs are used as a token of gratitude or party favoritism.

Former president Mauricio Macri has been investigated for nepotism after allegedly extending a tax amnesty to his family. Nonetheless, in 2018, the government of Mauricio Macri set a limit on nepotism through Decree 93/2018 establishing that "appointments of people could no longer be made, under any modality, throughout the National Public Sector, who have some kinship link both in straight line as well as in a collateral line up to the second degree, with the President and Vice President of the Nation, Chief of the Cabinet of Ministers, Ministers and other officials with the rank and hierarchy of Minister. The spouse and the Cohabitant Union are included. "

The Kirchnerist movement has been openly accused of believing in nepotism, treating meritocracy as a pejorative concept. The government's ministries and secretariats are reportedly plagued with friends, family and supporters of the current party leaders, many of whom have been criticized for being incompetent at their jobs.

On December 10, 2023, the libertarian president Javier Milei takes office – who campaigned criticizing the political "caste", an entelechy built to denigrate traditional political parties and among whose characteristics is that of appointing friends and family to public positions on a discretionary basis – and in one of his first measures he modifies the Mauricio Macri's Decree 93/2018 to be able to grant his sister, Karina Milei, the position of General Secretary of the Presidency. Less than two months later, Francisco Adorni, the brother of the government spokesperson Manuel Adorni, took a position as an advisor in the Ministry of Defense.

=== Australia ===
Shortly after he was appointed the Anglican Archbishop of Sydney in 2001, Peter Jensen was accused, in an Australian Broadcasting Corporation interview, of nepotism after nominating his brother Phillip Jensen as Dean of Sydney and appointing his wife Christine Jensen to an official position in the Sydney diocese.

Anna Bligh, who won the 2009 Queensland State election, has been accused of nepotism for giving her husband, Greg Withers, a position as the Office of Climate Change head.

Football Federation Australia was led by Frank Lowy from its inception in 2004 until his term limit exit in 2015. His son, Steven Lowy, who had little direct involvement in high-level sports governance, was nominated as his replacement by Frank, and was elected unopposed by a board strongly loyal to Frank. Steven's introduction exacerbated existing governance issues, with factional opposition led by City Football Group causing FIFA intervention to be threatened. Eventually, governance reforms were forced through despite opposition from the Lowy family, and it ended with Steven Lowy resigning from the role. Lowy had also been accused of nepotism regarding his sons in his corporate dealings as the founder of Westfield Group.

=== Azerbaijan ===
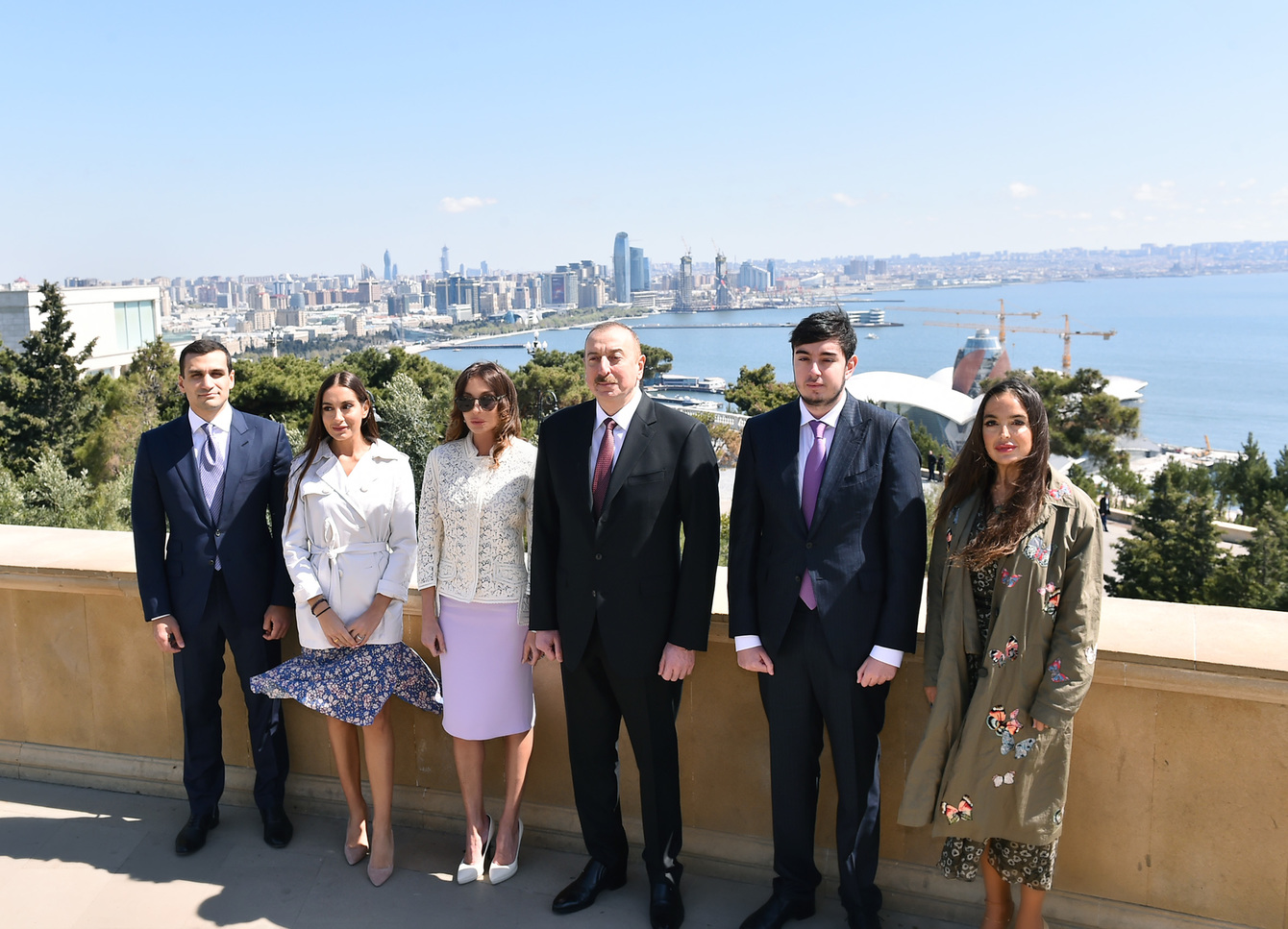
Aliyev family in 2018

On 21 February 2017, President of Azerbaijan Ilham Aliyev created the position of Vice President of Azerbaijan, then appointed his wife, Mehriban Aliyeva, to the position. Since 1993, the presidency of Azerbaijan has always been in the hands of a member of the Aliyev family: in 1993, Heydar Aliyev was elected president of Azerbaijan, and after his death in a United States hospital in 2003, his son Ilham Aliyev became president and has been since then. His regime has been accused of a lack of democratic freedoms and press freedom.

=== Belgium ===
Over the past decade, criticism has been growing over the creation of political dynasties in Belgium. This phenomenon has been explained by the fact that prominent party members control the ranking of candidates on party lists for elections and a candidate's place on a list determines who is elected. Another justification for the phenomenon is the importance of name recognition for collecting votes.

Claims of nepotism have been made against Bruno Tobback, the son of senator and former minister Louis Tobback, a member of the Flemish socialists. He became the Belgian federal government's minister for pensions and environment at 35 in 2005. Alexander De Croo, the son of former speaker of the Belgian parliament Herman De Croo, ran for the leadership of his father's party Open VLD at age 33. Finally, there is the example of Maya Detiège, the daughter of former mayor of the city of Antwerp Leona Detiège, who herself is the daughter of the former mayor of Antwerp Frans Detiège. Among other examples are former minister Freya Van Den Bossche and senator Jean-Jacques De Gucht, being the daughter and son, respectively, of former minister Luc Vandenbossche and former minister Karel De Gucht.

=== Cambodia ===
Prime Minister Hun Sen and senior members of Parliament are known for their hand in getting family members into government positions. In the 2013 Cambodian parliamentary elections, at least eight candidates were sons of high-ranking Cambodian People's Party officials. All sons of the ruling party lost but were eventually appointed to high-ranking government positions.

=== China ===
For the past 3,000 years, nepotism has been common in China's clan and extended family-based culture. Confucius wrote about the importance of balancing "filial piety with merit". The clan-based feudal system collapsed during Confucius' lifetime, yet nepotism has continued through the modern age.

=== France ===
In October 2009, Jean Sarkozy, the second son of the President of the French Republic, Nicolas Sarkozy, was poised to become the director of the major EPAD authority despite lacking any higher education degree and professional experience. In 2008, he was voted general councillor of Neuilly-sur-Seine, the town of which his father had previously been mayor.

In September 2009, rap-producer Pierre Sarkozy, the first son of then-President Nicolas Sarkozy, asked SCPP for a financial contribution of around €10000 towards an €80000 artistic project. Because he was not an SCPP member, the request was automatically rejected. Pierre Sarkozy then went to the Élysée, which led to an Élysée aide contacting the SCPP, and SCPP president Marc Guez assuring the issue would soon be favorably resolved. According to Abeille Musique president and SCPP member Yves Riesel, however, this would not happen as SCPP's financial help has been restricted to members only for months.

=== Greece ===
In Greece, it is common practice for family members of current or former party leaders to be party members and get appointed as ministers when the party is in government. In addition, there have been three prime ministers from the Papandreou family, two from the Mitsotakis family (one currently serving), two from the Karamanlis family (a third one was serving as minister of transportation until February 2023, quitting his position following the worst rail disaster in the history of the country).

=== India ===
Research conducted found that in India, family CEOs are generally paid more than professional CEOs, especially in high-performing, eponymous firms. Additionally, family CEOs in these firms exhibit greater pay-performance sensitivity, benefiting more from strong performance while remaining insulated from poor outcomes. These findings indicate that CEO compensation can be used by controlling families in emerging markets as a tool to extract private benefits, often at the expense of minority shareholders.

==== Nepotism in Indian politics ====
Since the 1980s, Indian politics has become dynastic, possibly due to the absence of elected party organization, independent civil society associations that mobilize support for a party, and centralized financing of elections. One example of dynastic politics has been the Nehru–Gandhi family, which produced three Indian prime ministers. Family members have also led the Congress Party for most of the period since 1978, when Indira Gandhi floated the then Congress(I) faction of the party. The ruling Bharatiya Janata Party also features several senior leaders who are dynasts. Dynastic politics is prevalent also in a number of political parties with regional presence such as Dravida Munnetra Kazhagam (DMK), Indian National Lok Dal (INLD), Jammu & Kashmir National Conference (JKNC), Jammu and Kashmir Peoples Democratic Party (JKPDP), All India Majlis-e-Ittehadul Muslimeen (AIMIM), Desiya Murpokku Dravida Kazhagam (DMDK), Janata Dal (Secular) (JD(s)), Jannayak Janta Party (JJP) Jharkhand Mukti Morcha (JMM), National People's Party (NPP), Nationalist Congress Party (NCP), Pattali Makkal Katchi (PMK), Rashtriya Janata Dal (RJD), Rashtriya Lok Dal (RLD), Samajwadi Party (SP), Shiromani Akali Dal (SKD), Shiv Sena (Uddhav Balasaheb Thackeray) (SS(UBT)), Bharat Rashtra Samithi (BRS), Yuvajana Shramika Rythu Congress Party (YSRCP) and Telugu Desam Party (TDP).

==== Judiciary ====
Many judges and advocates of the high courts and the Supreme Court of India are alleged to be appointed by exercising casteism, nepotism, and favoritism, primarily due to the Supreme Court and the high court appointment process called Collegium which recommends to the President, in a legally binding manner, the names of judges to be appointed or promoted to the higher judiciary. The various judicial services exams are also infamous for these practices.

==== Indian film industry ====
The Kapoor family, one of the most prolific generational families involved in Indian cinema, have been known for bringing their children into the industry with their endorsements and influence. In June 2020, a fresh debate on nepotism followed soon after the suicide of actor Sushant Singh Rajput, which fans believe was in reaction to efforts by Bollywood insiders to boycott him. Filmmaker Karan Johar, whom Rajput had worked in the Netflix film Drive (2019), was quickly accused of nepotism by actress Kangana Ranaut, with Rajput's fans calling for a boycott of Johar and his studio, Dharma Productions, as well as of actor Salman Khan and his brothers, who were accused of bullying outsiders in the past. Actors and actresses Alia Bhatt, Varun Dhawan, Janhvi Kapoor, Ishaan Khatter, Ananya Pandey, Athiya Shetty, Tiger Shroff, Arjun Kapoor and Sara Ali Khan, all of whom hail from film families, were also widely criticized.

=== Indonesia ===
Suharto, Indonesia's second president, is involved in nepotism, alongside corruption and collusion (together, they are known as the KKN in Indonesian: korupsi, kolusi, dan nepotisme). Companies belonging to Suharto's children, particularly Siti Hardiyanti Rukmana ("Tutut"), Hutomo Mandala Putra ("Tommy"), and Bambang Trihatmodjo, were given lucrative government contracts and protected from market competition by monopolies. Examples include the toll-expressway company Jasamarga (monopolized by Tutut), the national car project Timor (monopolized by Bambang and Tommy), and the cinema market (monopolized by 21 Cineplex, which is owned by Suharto's cousin Sudwikatmono). The family is said to control about 36,000 km^{2} (14,000 sq mi) of real estate in Indonesia, including 100,000 m^{2} (1,100,000 sq ft) of prime office space in Jakarta and nearly 40% of the land in East Timor. Additionally, Suharto's family members received free shares in 1,251 of Indonesia's most lucrative domestic companies (mostly run by Suharto's ethnic-Chinese cronies), while foreign-owned companies were encouraged to establish "strategic partnerships" with the former Indonesian president's family companies. In 2024, Suharto's former son in law Prabowo Subianto became President of Indonesia.

=== Mauritius ===
Since the first democratic elections in 1948, the field of politics in Mauritius has been marked by a handful of families who have controlled the four major political parties which exist to this day. They are often referred to as the "modern dynasties" of Mauritian politics, such as the Duval, Bérenger, Gunowa (Gungah), Curé, Uteem, Mohamed, Boolell, Ramgoolam and Jugnauth families. The Boolell family's involvement in politics started with Satcam Boolell in 1955, paving the way for his son Arvin Boolell, nephews Satish Boolell, Anil Gayan, and Sanjay Bhuckory, and son-in-law Sushil Kushiram to enter politics. The Duval dynasty started with ex-Lord mayor and minister Gaetan Duval, followed by his sons Xavier and Richard, as well as his grandson Adrien. Lall Jugnauth was the first of his clan to enter politics in the 1950s and was followed by his cousins Aneerood and Ashock as well as his nephew Pravind. Abdool Razack Mohamed, who migrated from India in the 1930s, became Lord Mayor and minister; his son, Yousuf and grandson, Shakeel, were also elected and served as ministers. Roshi Bhadain, who was a minister of the MSM government, is the nephew of former Labour Party minister Vasant Bunwaree. Roshi Bhadain and Akilesh Deerpalsing (Bhadain's advisor and campaign manager, who is also the son of former minister Kishore Deerpalsing) were investigated by ICAC in 2019 for suspicious recruitment practices when he was a minister.

In March 2020, Harry Ganoo, the retired brother of Minister Alan Ganoo, was nominated as the new president of the Civil Service College Mauritius, a few months after the November 2019 General Elections.

=== Malaysia ===
The appointment of Nurul Izzah Anwar as a senior economic and finance advisor by Prime Minister Anwar Ibrahim resulted in accusations of nepotism. The action was widely criticized by intellectuals, NGOs and even party members of the Pakatan Harapan coalition, who claimed it contravened principles of merit and fairness.

=== Malta ===
Due to its small native population, Malta has an entrenched culture of nepotism, which became more evident since the country gained independence from the British Empire in 1964.

In a Eurobarometer survey published in 2023, 55% of Maltese businesses reported that nepotism and patronage were primary problems, and 70% said close links between businesspeople and politicians led to corruption.

By comparison, only 37% of respondents in other EU member states saw nepotism and patronage as problematic, and 35% cited corruption as a concern.

=== Romania ===
Members of the Romanian Communist dictator Nicolae Ceaușescu's family dominated the country for decades. Elena Băsescu, the daughter of President Traian Băsescu, was elected to the European Parliament in 2009, despite having no significant professional or political experience.

=== Singapore ===
Singapore's government has been the target of numerous charges of nepotism, with several members of the Prime Minister's family holding high-ranking posts. Lee Kuan Yew, who was prime minister from 1959 to 1990, preceded his son Lee Hsien Loong. Other family members holding high positions include the elder Lee's daughter, Lee Wei Ling, the director of the National Neurological Institute, his other son, Lee Hsien Yang, the chief executive officer of Singapore Telecommunications from 1995 to 2007 and the younger Lee's wife, Ho Ching, who was appointed chief executive officer of state holding investment company Temasek Holdings. The family members dispute the charges as they arise.

=== Sri Lanka ===
Former President of Sri Lanka, Mahinda Rajapaksa, has been accused of nepotism, appointing three brothers to run important ministries and giving out other political positions to relatives, regardless of their merit. During his presidency, the Rajapaksa family held the ministries of finance, defence, ports and aviation, and highways and road development. The president's brother, Gotabhaya Rajapaksa, was given the post of Defence Secretary. He also controlled the armed forces, the police and the Coast Guard, and was responsible for immigration and emigration. Rajapaksa appointed his brother Basil Rajapaksa as Minister of Economic Development. Together, the Rajapaksa brothers controlled over 70% of Sri Lanka's public budget. Mahinda Rajapaksa's eldest brother, Chamal Rajapaksa, was appointed as the Speaker of the Parliament of Sri Lanka, and has held many other posts before, while his eldest son, Namal Rajapaksa, is also a member of the parliament and holds undisclosed portfolios.

Others include his nephew, Shashindra Rajapaksa, the former Chief Minister of Uva; one of his cousins, Jaliya Wickramasuriya, the former Sri Lankan ambassador to the United States; and another cousin, Udayanga Weeratunga, the former ambassador to Russia. Dozens of nephews, nieces, cousins, and in-laws have also been appointed heads of banks, boards, and corporations.

Chandrika Kumaratunga, who served as the former president of Sri Lanka from 1994 to 2005 and former Prime Minister of Sri Lanka in 1994, is the daughter of S. W. R. D. Bandaranaike and Sirimavo Bandaranaike, who both served as Prime Ministers of Ceylon from 1956 to 1959, 1960 to 1965, 1970 to 1977 and 1994 to 2000. Her brother Anura Bandaranaike served as the Speaker of the Parliament of Sri Lanka from 2000 to 2001

Also, former president Ranasinghe Premadasa's son Sajith Premadasa is the Opposition leader of Sri Lanka, who ran for the presidential election in 2019 as well.

Also Ranil Wickremesinghe, who served as prime minister of Sri Lanka from 1993 to 1994, 2001 to 2004, 2015 to 2018 and 2018 to 2019, is a nephew of former Sri Lankan president J. R. Jayewardene. Also, a defense state minister of his government, Ruwan Wijewardene, is a cousin of Ranil Wickremesinghe. Also, Ruwan is the great-grandson of UNP founder and Sri Lanka's first Prime Minister D. S. Senanayake. Ruwan has been given a high priority in the party by Ranil, by giving leadership roles.

=== Spain ===
Nepotism occurred in Spanish Colonial America when offices were given to family members.

Juan Antonio Samaranch Salisachs, son of Juan Antonio Samaranch (president of the International Olympic Committee (IOC) from 1980 to 2001), has been a member of the International Olympic Committee since 2001; his daughter, Maria Teresa Samaranch Salisachs, has been president of the Spanish Federation of Sports on Ice since 2005.

=== United Kingdom ===
The Marquess of Salisbury, who was prime minister for three separate occasions from 1885 to 1902 for a total of approximately 14 years, appointed his nephew, Arthur Balfour, as Chief Secretary for Ireland in 1887 and later as prime minister in 1902. This is supposedly the origin of the phrase "Bob's your uncle".

In 1977, during his father-in-law James Callaghan's term as prime minister, Peter Jay was appointed ambassador to the United States. As Jay was just 40 years old, was not a diplomat and had never held any public office; the appointment caused some controversy and accusations of nepotism.

In February 2010, Sir Christopher Kelly, chairman of the Committee on Standards in Public Life, said that more than 200 MPs used Parliamentary allowances to employ their own relatives in a variety of office roles. He suggested that the practice should be banned.

North Yorkshire Police's Chief Constable Grahame Maxwell was disciplined by the IPCC in 2011, but refused to resign, after admitting that he assisted a relative through the first stages of a recruitment process.

Many Northern Irish politicians employ family members. In 2008, 19 elected politicians of the Democratic Unionist Party (DUP) directly employed family members and relatives, comprising 27 of its 136 staff.

In 2020, Kate Bingham, the wife of British Conservative Party politician and then-Financial Secretary to the Treasury Jesse Norman, was appointed chair of the UK's Vaccine Taskforce—the group set up to lead UK efforts to find and manufacture a COVID-19 vaccine — despite other more qualified people being proposed.

=== United States ===
Nepotism is found in the United States, though some employers and government agencies enact laws or policies intended to restrict the practice.

Palm Beach County, Florida, schools reinforced nepotism rules as of 2012 to ensure an "equitable work environment".

In December 2012, a report from The Washington Post indicated various nepotism practices from the District of Columbia and Northern Virginia's Metropolitan Washington Airports Authority (MWAA), including one family with five members working for the MWAA. One of the reasons given by the associate general counsel to defend the alleged nepotism was "if [the employees are] qualified and competed for [the positions] on their own, I don't see a problem with relatives working in the same organization." The inspector general of the U.S. Department of Transportation and the US Congress pressured the MWAA to resolve practices of nepotism. Authority employees are no longer allowed to directly or indirectly influence the hiring or promotion of relatives, as documented in their ethics policy.

==== Politics ====
President John Adams appointed his eldest son, John Quincy Adams, as the first United States Minister to Prussia.

Around 30 family members or relatives of President Ulysses S. Grant prospered financially in some way from either government appointments or employment.

President Franklin Roosevelt submitted the name of his son Elliott Roosevelt to the Senate for promotion to brigadier general. Following threats of resignation and pressure, Elliott Roosevelt was made a rated pilot during World War II. A suitable vacancy could not be found for him after his father's death, and his last day of service was VJ-Day. Franklin Roosevelt also appointed his eldest son, James Roosevelt, as an administrative assistant to the president and a secretary to the president. James Roosevelt was the White House coordinator for 18 federal agencies. Time magazine suggested that he might be considered "Assistant President of the United States".

President John F. Kennedy made his brother-in-law, Sargent Shriver, the first director of the Peace Corps and his younger brother, Robert F. Kennedy, Attorney General.

President Richard Nixon faced lingering allegations stemming from the business dealings of his younger brother Donald Nixon, notably the younger Nixon's ties to the influential US defense businessman Howard Hughes, who loaned him $205,000 in 1956 to prop up his failing restaurant business; although the loan was never repaid, he subsequently maintained a close relationship to John H. Meier, a prominent Hughes lieutenant. Richard Nixon also appointed John Eisenhower as United States Ambassador to Belgium. Richard Nixon was the father of Eisenhower's daughter-in-law, Julie.

In 1979, Bill Clinton, within weeks of being newly elected as Governor of Arkansas, appointed his wife, Hillary, to chair the Rural Health Advisory Committee. In 1993, newly elected as President of the United States, he again appointed his wife to chair a Task Force on National Health Care Reform. In 2013, Bill appointed his daughter, Chelsea, a member of the governing board of the Clinton Foundation and Clinton Global Initiative.

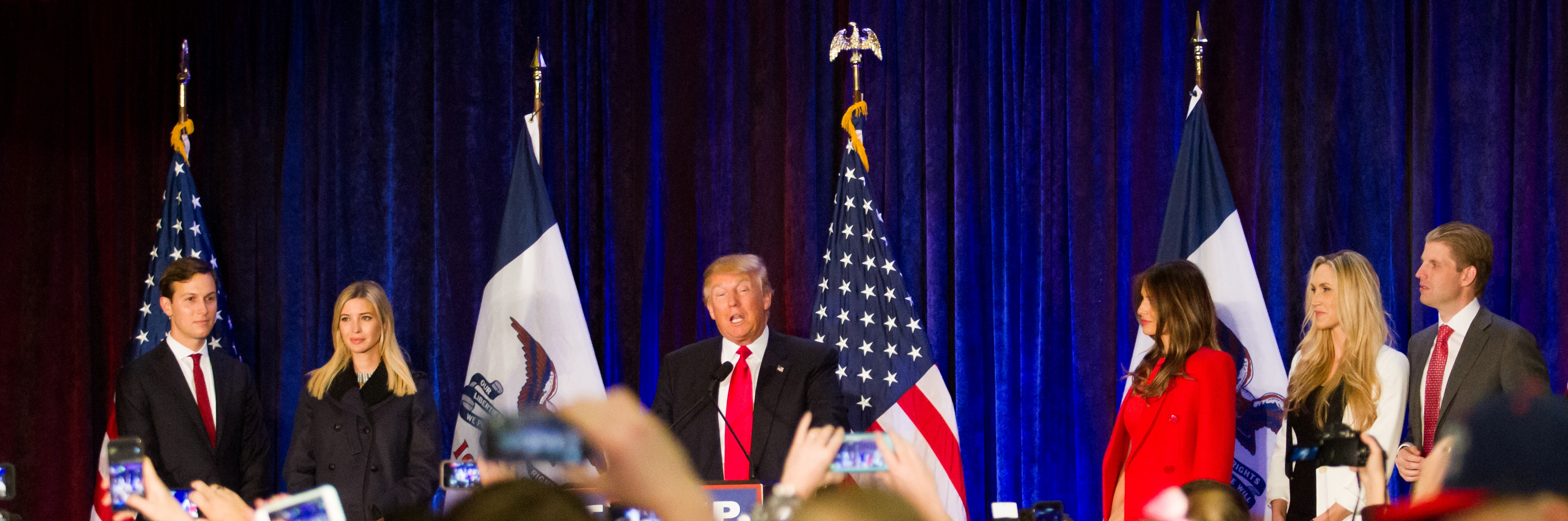
The Trump family

In 2017, President Donald Trump was accused of nepotism after appointing both his son-in-law, Jared Kushner and his older daughter Ivanka (married to Kushner) into advisory roles to the president. Neither Jared nor Ivanka had any experience in public service. In 2020, President Trump appointed Kyle Yunaska, the brother-in-law of his son Eric, to the position of NASA Deputy Chief of Staff.

In 2024, President Joe Biden was accused of nepotism for pardoning his surviving son Hunter Biden's federal felony gun and tax convictions, as well as any other offense against the United States occurring between January 1, 2014 and December 1, 2024.

==== Legality ====
Current (since 1995) US court rulings have held that the White House itself does not constitute an "agency" for the purposes of adhering to existing anti-nepotism laws on the books.

=== Venezuela ===
Nepotism is known to be practiced by the President of the Venezuelan National Assembly, Cilia Flores. Nine positions in the National Assembly were filled by Flores' family members, including a mother-in-law, aunt, three siblings, a cousin and her mother, and two nephews.

=== Zimbabwe ===
The late Robert Mugabe was reported to be preparing his wife, Grace Mugabe, to be the next president of Zimbabwe while he was president.

== Types of partiality ==
Nepotism refers to partiality to family, whereas cronyism refers to partiality to an associate or friend. Favoritism, the broadest of the terms, refers to partiality based upon being part of a favored group, rather than job performance.

== See also ==
- Political families
- Ingroup bias
- Hereditary politicians
- Aghazadeh
- Nepo baby
- Collectivism
- Cronyism
