= Prokopis Pavlopoulos =

President of Greece from 2015 to 2020

- Προκόπης Παυλόπουλος
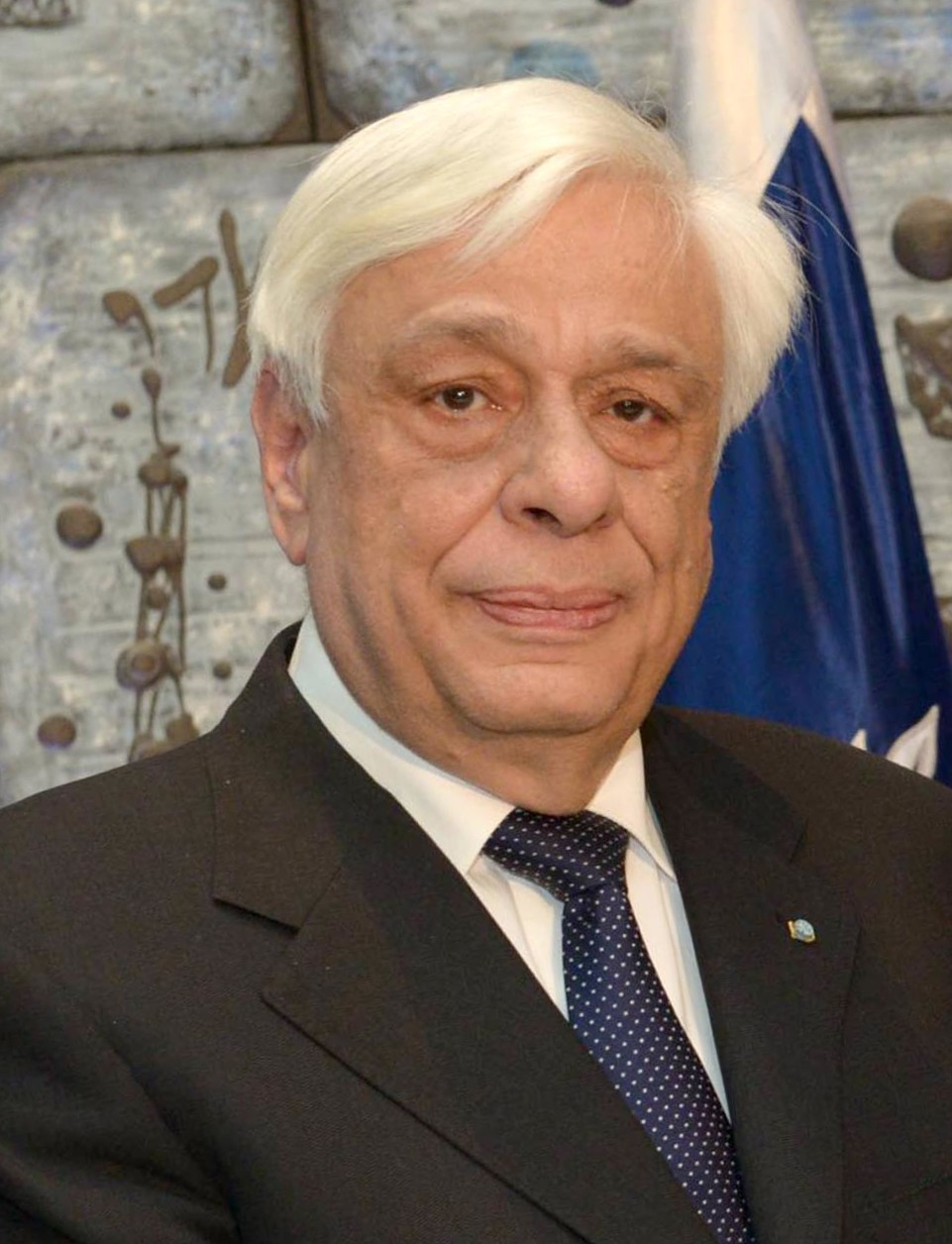
- Pavlopoulos in 2016

President of Greece
- In office 13 March 2015 – 13 March 2020
- Prime Minister: Alexis Tsipras; Vassiliki Thanou-Christophilou (caretaker); Alexis Tsipras; Kyriakos Mitsotakis
- Preceded by: Karolos Papoulias
- Succeeded by: Katerina Sakellaropoulou

Minister of the Interior
- In office 19 September 2007 – 11 September 2009
- Prime Minister: Kostas Karamanlis
- Preceded by: Spyridon Flogaitis
- Succeeded by: Spyridon Flogaitis
- In office 10 March 2004 – 24 August 2007
- Prime Minister: Kostas Karamanlis
- Preceded by: Nikos Alivizatos
- Succeeded by: Spyridon Flogaitis

Member of the Hellenic Parliament
- In office 22 September 1996 – 31 December 2014
- Constituency: Athens A

Personal details
- Born: 10 July 1950 (age 76) Kalamata, Kingdom of Greece
- Party: New Democracy
- Spouse: Vlassia Peltsemi
- Children: 3
- Education: University of Athens; Panthéon-Assas University

Prokopios "Prokopis" Pavlopoulos (Greek: Προκόπιος "Προκόπης" Παυλόπουλος, pronounced [proˈkopis pavˈlopulos]; born 10 July 1950) is a Greek retired politician, who served as the President of Greece from 2015 to 2020. A member of New Democracy, he previously was Minister of the Interior from 2004 to 2009. He was succeeded by Katerina Sakellaropoulou on 13 March 2020, who became the first woman to serve as President of Greece.

== Academic career ==
Prokopis Pavlopoulos was born in Kalamata to high school principal and classics teacher Vasilios Pavlopoulos and grew up in the same city. After finishing school in his home town, he entered the Law School of the University of Athens in 1968.

In 1975, on a government scholarship, he received his DEA from the Paris Panthéon-Assas University, followed by his PhD in 1977 on Public Law. He then returned to Greece to serve his military service in the Hellenic Army (1978–79). He was elected Lecturer at the University of Athens in 1980, and he was promoted to Reader in 1981. In 1983 he became Assistant Professor and he was promoted to Associate Professor in 1986. In 1989, he was elected (Full) Professor of Administrative Law. In 1986, Pavlopoulos was an adjunct faculty member at the Panthéon-Assas University.

== Political career ==
=== Early political career ===
Pavlopoulos was secretary to the first President of the metapolitefsi, Michail Stasinopoulos, in 1974. From November 1989 to April 1990, he served as alternate Minister for the Presidency and government spokesman in the ecumenical government headed by Xenophon Zolotas. He served as head of the legal office to President Konstantinos Karamanlis from 1990 to 1995, and political advisor to Miltiadis Evert, then chairman of New Democracy, from September 1995. He was elected as a Member of Parliament for the New Democracy party in the 1996 parliamentary election; in the 2000 parliamentary election, he was elected as an MP for the Athens A constituency. He was appointed as New Democracy's Press and Information Spokesman by Evert on 20 April 1996; he subsequently became its Parliamentary Spokesman on 14 April 2000. Pavlopoulos was successively re-elected for Athens A in the 2000, 2004, 2007, 2009 and 2012 elections.

=== Minister of the Interior (2004–2009) ===
Following the March 2004 legislative election, which was won by New Democracy, Pavlopoulos became Minister of the Interior, Public Administration and Decentralisation in the new government of the Prime Minister Kostas Karamanlis on 10 March 2004. In the government appointed following New Democracy's victory in the September 2007 parliamentary election, the Interior Ministry was merged with the Ministry of Public Order; Pavlopoulous became Minister of the Interior and Public Order.

He is a member of the Central Committee of New Democracy, and on 29 July 2004 he was designated as a member of the party's Political Council as one of seven MP candidates; no vote was necessary because there were only seven MP seats available on the Council.

=== President of Greece (2015–2020) ===
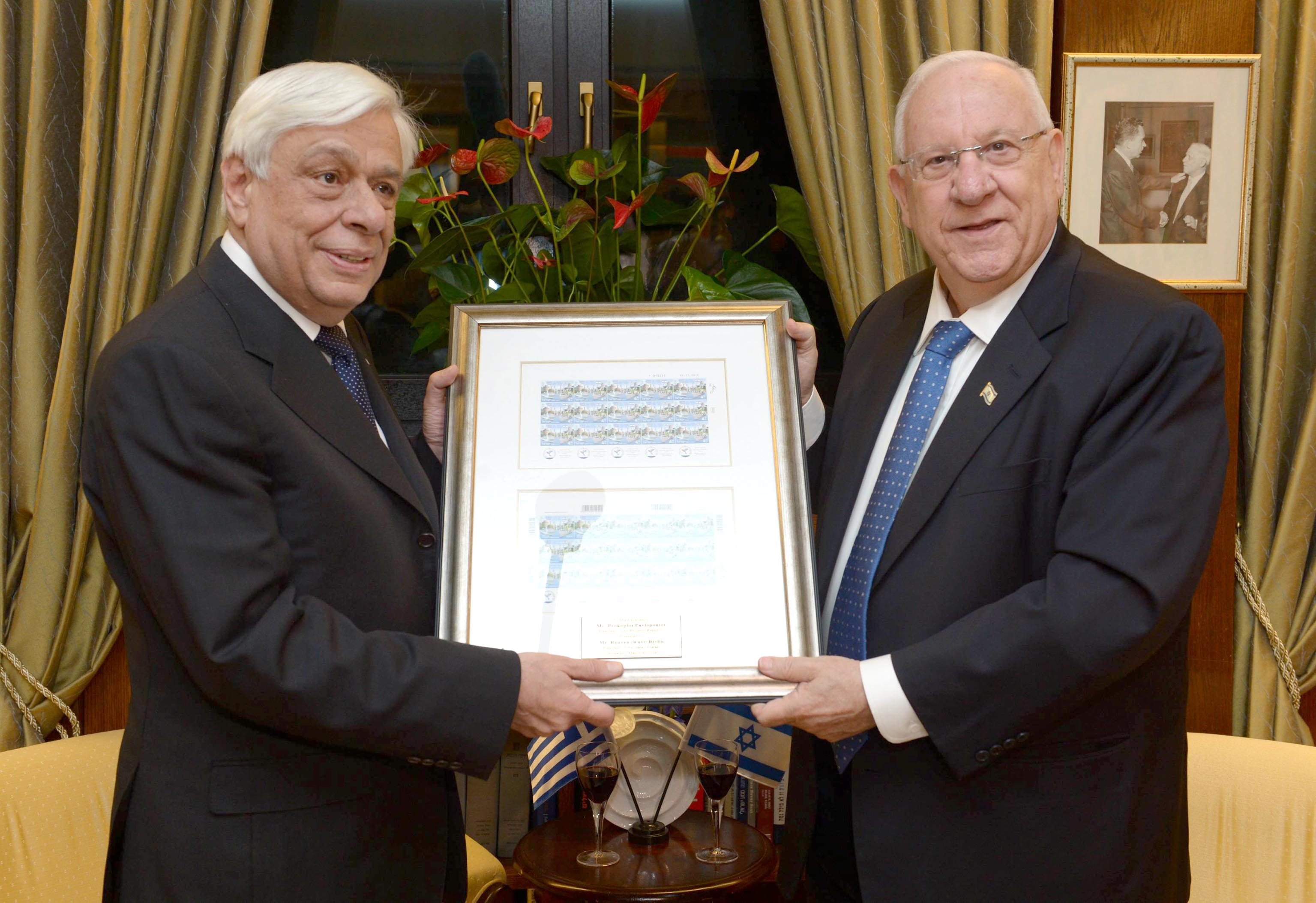
Pavlopoulos with Israeli President Reuven Rivlin, 30 March 2016

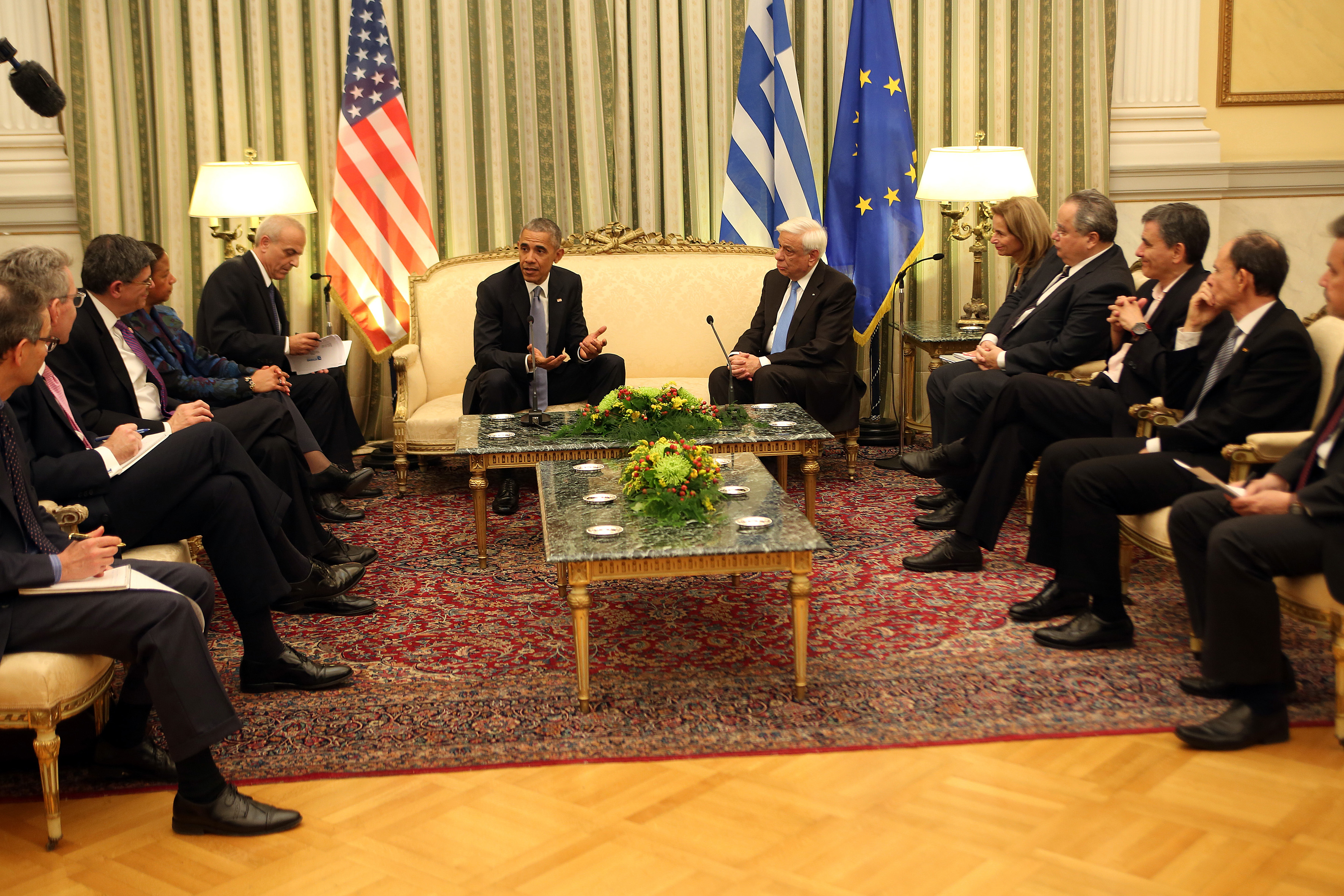
Pavlopoulos with U.S. President Barack Obama, 15 November 2016

On 17 February, Prime Minister Alexis Tsipras nominated Pavlopoulos as the ruling Syriza–ANEL coalition's candidate for the post of President of Greece in the presidential election that had begun in December 2014. On 18 February 2015, backed by Syriza, ANEL and his own New Democracy party, Pavlopoulos was elected by the Hellenic Parliament as the new President of Greece with 233 votes in favour. He succeeded Karolos Papoulias after the end of the latter's term on 13 March 2015.

== Personal life ==
Pavlopoulos is married to Vlassia Pavlopoulou-Peltsemi and together they have two daughters, Maria and Zoe, and one son, Vasilis.

David Davis, the son of Katherine, Crown Princess of Yugoslavia (and her husband Alexander Davis), is a godchild of President Prokopis Pavlopoulos.

== Honours ==
- Cyprus: Grand Collar of the Order of Makarios III – 30 March 2015
- France: Grand Cross of the Order of the Legion of Honour – 22 October 2015
- Italy: Knight Grand Cross with Collar of the Order of Merit of the Italian Republic – 23 November 2015
- Portugal: Grand Collar of the Order of Prince Henry – 27 January 2017
- Poland: Knight of the Order of the White Eagle – 18 November 2017
- Serbia: Grand Cross of the Order of the Republic of Serbia – 15 February 2021

Political offices
Preceded by Nikos Alivizatos	Minister of the Interior; 2004–2007	Succeeded by Spyridon Flogaitis
Preceded by Spyridon Flogaitis	Minister of the Interior; 2007–2009	Succeeded by Spyridon Flogaitis
Preceded by Karolos Papoulias	President of Greece; 2015–2020	Succeeded by Katerina Sakellaropoulou
