= Dimitris Moustakas =

Greek lawyer and judge

- Δημήτρης Μουστάκας

Minister of Labour and Social Solidarity
- In office 28 August 2015 – 23 September 2015
- Prime Minister: Vassiliki Thanou-Christophilou
- Preceded by: Georgios Katrougalos
- Succeeded by: Georgios Katrougalos

Personal details
- Born: Euboea, Greece
- Education: University of Athens
- Profession: Lawyer

Dimitris Moustakas (Greek: Δημήτρης Μουστάκας) is a Greek lawyer and judge who served as the Minister of Labour and Social Solidarity in the Caretaker Cabinet of Vassiliki Thanou-Christophilou.

== Early life and education ==
Moustakas was born in Euboea and studied law the University of Athens.

== Professional career ==
Moustakas joined the judiciary in 1975 and is currently a senior judge. He has edited the literary column of the Legal News, published by the Association of Judges and Prosecutors.

== Political career ==
Moustakas was appointed as the Minister of Labour and Social Solidarity in the Caretaker Cabinet of Vassiliki Thanou-Christophilou on 28 August 2015.

== Personal life ==
Moustakas has published three collections of poetry, one of which was for children. In 2001 he was awarded the first prize in National Short Story Literary Contest of the Philological Department of Piraeus Association and in 2008 he was awarded the second prize for poetry in nationwide poetry contest of Writers' Union of Northern Greece.
