= Nikolaos Chountis =

Greek politician

Nikolaos Chountis MEP
- Νικόλαος Χουντής
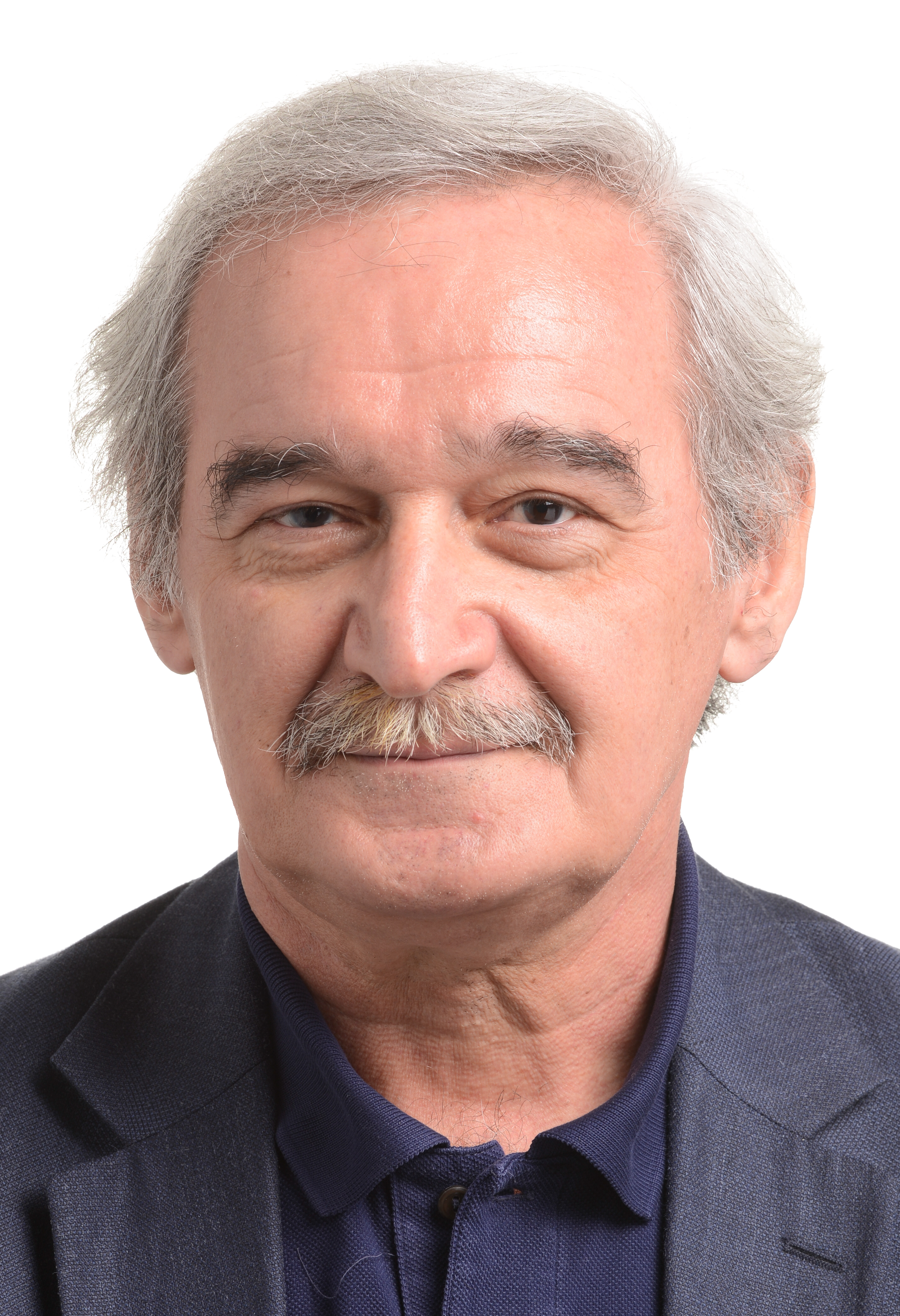

Member of the European Parliament for Greece
- In office 2014–2019
- Preceded by: Manolis Glezos
- In office 14 July 2009 – 30 June 2014
- In office 15 April 2004 – 19 July 2004
- Preceded by: Alekos Alavanos

Alternate Minister of European Affairs
- In office 27 January 2015 – 13 July 2015
- Succeeded by: Sia Anagnostopoulou

Member of the Hellenic Parliament for Athens B
- In office 25 January 2015 – 13 July 2015
- Succeeded by: Georgios Miltiadi Kyritsis

Personal details
- Born: 17 September 1953 (age 72) Langadia, Arcadia, Greece
- Party: Popular Unity
- Other political affiliations: Synaspismos, Syriza (until 2015)
- Spouse: Dr Evmorfia Sagkana
- Education: National Technical University of Athens; Panteion University
- Occupation: Electrical engineer and politician

Nikolaos Chountis (Greek: Νικόλαος Χουντής; born 17 September 1953 in Langadia, Arcadia) is a Greek politician and former Member of the European Parliament, currently serving as General Secretary of the political party Popular Unity.

== Early life and education ==
Chountis was born in Langadia, Arcadia. He graduated with a degree in electrical engineering from the National Technical University of Athens and with a degree in political science from the Panteion University.

== Political career ==
On 15 April 2004, Chountis succeeded Alekos Alavanos in his role as a Member of the European Parliament for Greece. Chountis served until 19 July 2004, following the 2004 European Parliament election. During this period he represented Synaspismos.

Following the 2009 European Parliament election, Chountis was elected as a Syriza Member of European Parliament. He served until 2014 as Syriza's only MEP.

Following the January 2015 Greek legislative election, he was elected a Member of the Hellenic Parliament for the Athens B constituency, representing Syriza. On 27 January 2015, he was appointed by Prime Minister Alexis Tsipras as the Alternate Minister of European Affairs in his cabinet.

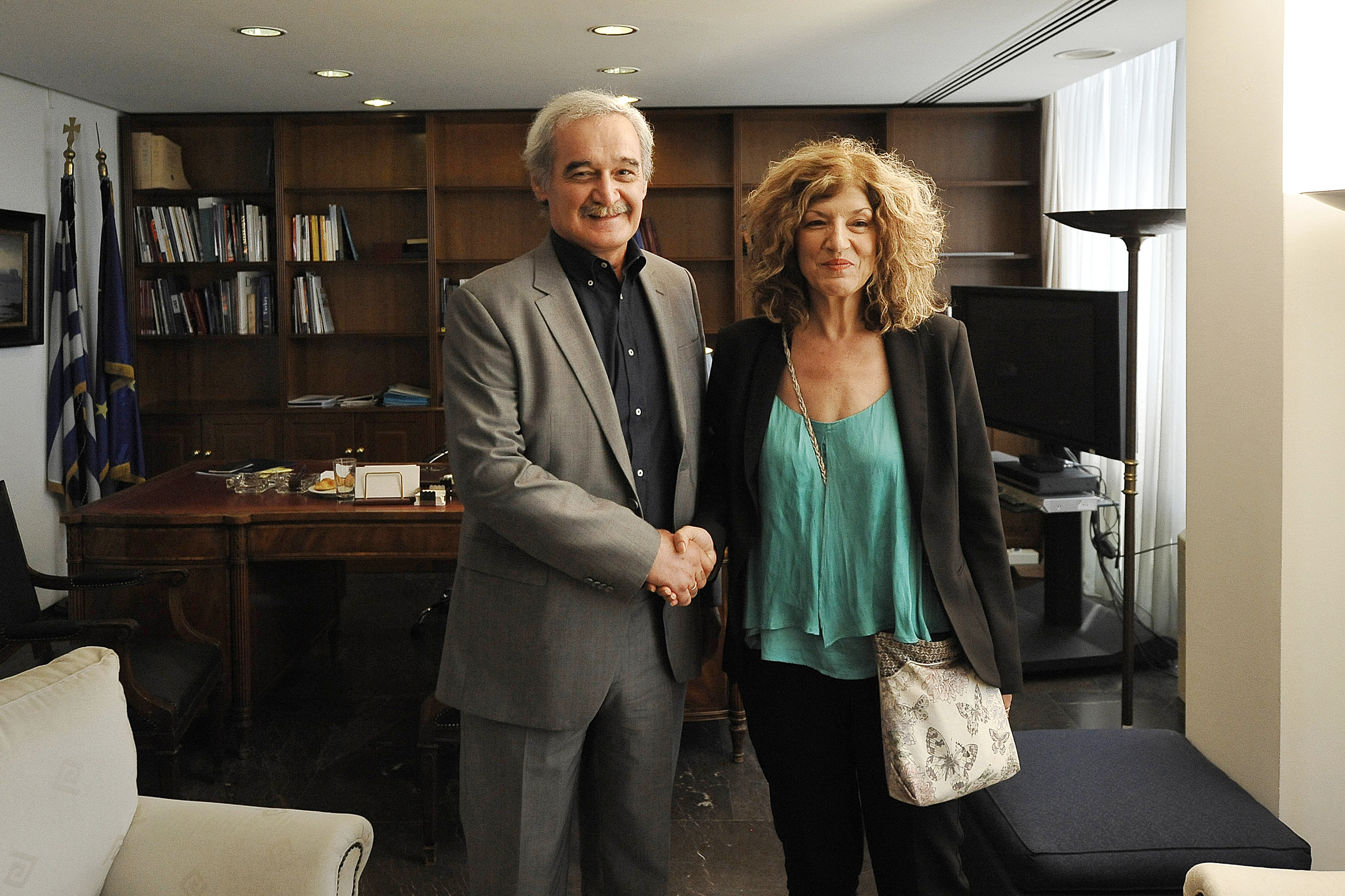
Hountis with successor Sia Anagnostopoulou.

A member of the Syriza's Left Platform, Hountis was internally opposed to the government's bridge agreement in February. On 13 July 2015, following Tsipras' agreement with the European creditors and well ahead of the parliamentary vote, Hountis resigned from his ministerial office to be replaced by Sia Anagnostopoulou. He also resigned from Parliament and was succeeded by Giorgos Kyritsis.

Succeeding the retired Manolis Glezos on 20 July 2015, he once again became a Member of the European Parliament.

On 26 August 2015, he defected to Popular Unity, alongside 52 other members of Syriza's central committee. He becomes Popular Unity's only MEP.

== Personal life ==
Chountis is married to Dr Evmorfia Sagkana.
