= Papandreou =

Papandreou (Greek: Παπανδρέου) is a Greek surname. It is the surname of:

- Georgios Papandreou (historian) (1859–1940), historian and linguist
- Georgios Papandreou (1888–1968), Greek politician and Prime Minister of Greece.
- Dimitrios Papandreou (1891–1949), Archbishop Damaskinos of Athens.
- Andreas Papandreou (1919–1996), Greek economist and politician and Prime Minister of Greece.
- Vasso Papandreou (1944–2024), Greek PASOK politician, European Commissioner
- George Papandreou (born 1952), Greek politician and Prime Minister of Greece.
- Giorgos Papandreou (born 1969), footballer

== Etymology ==
Probably borrowed from Medieval Latin: papas, from Ancient Greek: πάπας, romanized: pápas, lit. 'bishop, patriarch', variant of πάππας, páppas, 'father'. Andreou (Greek: Ανδρέου pronounced [an̪ˈðre̞u], also spelt Αντρέου) is a common surname in Greece and Cyprus. It originally meant 'son of Andrew' or 'son of Andreas'. Andreou is of pre-Christian Greek origin although in Western Europe it gained popularity during the Crusades (mostly in the form of Andreas/Andrew) and was also one of the earliest settler names in America.

== In popular culture ==
Many streets and squares in Greece are named Andreas or George Papandreou after the members of the Greek political dynasty.
