= Georgios Katrougalos =

Greek jurist & politician (born 1963)

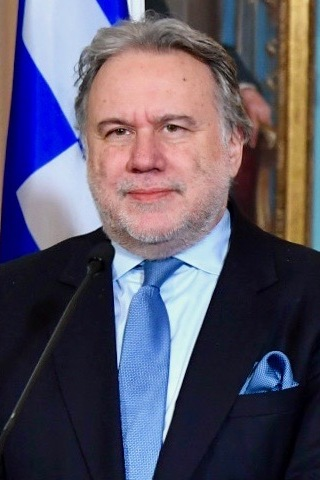

Minister of Foreign Affairs
- In office 15 February 2019 – 8 July 2019
- Prime Minister: Alexis Tsipras
- Preceded by: Alexis Tsipras
- Succeeded by: Nikos Dendias

Alternate Minister of Foreign Affairs
- In office 5 November 2016 – 15 February 2019
- Preceded by: Nikos Xydakis
- Succeeded by: Sia Anagnostopoulou

Minister of Labour, Social Insurance and Social Solidarity
- In office 23 September 2015 – 5 November 2016
- Preceded by: Dimitris Moustakas
- Succeeded by: Effie Achtsioglou
- In office 17 July 2015 – 28 August 2015
- Preceded by: Panos Skourletis
- Succeeded by: Dimitris Moustakas

Alternate Minister of Interior and Administrative Reconstruction
- In office 27 January 2015 – 17 July 2015
- Preceded by: Kyriakos Mitsotakis
- Succeeded by: Cristoforos Vernardakis

Member of the European Parliament for Greece
- In office 1 July 2014 – 26 January 2015

Personal details
- Born: 27 March 1963 (age 63) Athens, Greece
- Party: Syriza
- Education: National and Kapodistrian University of Athens; Pantheon-Sorbonne University
- Occupation: Lawyer

Georgios Katrougalos (Greek: Γιώργος Κατρούγκαλος; born 27 March 1963) is a Greek jurist and politician who served as the Minister of Foreign Affairs from February to July 2019. He is currently (since 5 April 2024) UN Independent Expert on the promotion of a democratic and equitable international order. He previously served as an Alternate Minister of Foreign Affairs from 5 November 2016 to 15 February 2019, as the Minister of Labour and Social Solidarity from 23 September 2015 to 5 November 2016 and from 18 July 2015 to 28 August 2015. From 27 January 2015 to 17 July 2015 he served as an Alternate Minister of Interior and Administrative Reconstruction in Tsipras's first cabinet.

== Education ==
Katrougalos studied Law from 1980 to 1985 at National and Kapodistrian University of Athens and continued his research studies (P.h.D) in Administrative and Constitutional Law at Pantheon-Sorbonne University (Université Paris 1 Panthéon-Sorbonne). In 1990 he was awarded a P.h.D. with “Honors”. His doctoral thesis is entitled « The legitimacy crisis of Public Administration – The case of Greece». He is a member of Athens Bar Association since 1987.

== Professional and Academic career ==
In 1994, and again from 1997 to 2002, Katrougalos was legal advisor at the Ministry of Education. Meanwhile, he lectured and conducted research as visiting professor at University Roskilde in Denmark and National and Kapodistrian University of Athens (Athens Law School). From 1997 he is a member of the Board of the Centre for European Constitutional Law. From 1998 to 2011, he was accredited as mediator and arbitrator at the Greek Organization for Mediation and Arbitration. From 2000 to 2003, he was advisor to the Greek Permanent Mission to the United Nations (for the works of the 3rd Committee of the UN General Assembly). In 2002, he was appointed Professor of Public Law at Democritus University of Thrace, where he was also President of the Department of Political Sciences and Social Administration. From 2003 to 2004, he was a member of an experts' committee in the Ministry of Foreign Affairs working on the drafting of the European Constitution. Katrougalos has also worked as advisor for law reforms in Uzbekistan, Albania, North Macedonia, Syria and Armenia. He has taught or given lectures as invited speaker at, among others, NYU, Columbia University, Humboldt University, Roskilde University, LSE, Oxford (St Antony's College), New Delhi Law School. He has published many books and articles in Greek, English, French, Russian and Spanish periodicals.

== Political career ==
Katrougalos was active at the students' movement in Greece. As a constitutional expert and professor he was involved in a number of public interest litigation, especially regarding social rights, as well as privacy rights under the threat of public surveillance systems. During the economic crisis of 2010 he sharply criticized the austerity policies dictated by the IMF, with scientific articles, public action at national and European courts. He has actively participated at the civil movement of the so-called in Greece "struggle of the squares".

At the European elections of 2014, Katrougalos was elected as a member of the European Parliament with SYRIZA party. At the EU Parliament was a member of the European United Left/Nordic Green Left European Parliamentary Group (GUE/NGL) and the Coordinator of the Group of European Left at the Committee on Constitutional Affairs (AFCO) When SYRIZA won the elections of January 2015, Katrougalos was appointed Alternate Minister of Interior and Administrative Reform. From 23 September 2015 to 5 November 2016 and from 18 July 2015 to 28 August 2015 he served as Minister for Labour and Social Solidarity. He has designed the pensions reform, which has unified the highly fragmented system of Greek Social Security.

From 5 November 2016 to 15 February 2019 he served as an Alternate Minister of Foreign Affairs and from 15 February 2019 to 8 July 2019 he served as the Minister of Foreign Affairs. He has supported the ratification of Prespa Agreement at the Hellenic Parliament.

He has been elected for the first time member of the Hellenic Parliament at the elections of September 2015 and reelected at the elections of July 2019. In the May 2023 election, he withdrew from the election battle three days before the election due to a statement he made regarding the 2016 insurance reform. He is, since 2019, Vice Chair of the Group of the United European Left at the Parliamentary Assembly of the Council of Europe (PACE) and since 2021 President of the Sub-committee on the Middle East and the Arab World of PACE. In March 2022 he has been unanimously elected President of the Group.

As minister of Foreign Affairs he has initiated the strategic dialogue of Greece with the USA, but he is also a proponent of the strategic autonomy of the European Foreign Policy and Defense vis-à-vis NATO. He is Honorary Fellow of the Foreign Policy Association

== Family ==
Katrougalos is married and has two daughters.

== Works (selection) ==
- Ανισότητες και Δίκαιο, Alexandria, Athens, 2014.
- The (Dim) Perspectives of the European Social Citizenship. Jean Monnet Working Paper Nr. 05/07, NYU School of Law, New York 2007.
- Southern European welfare states. Problems, challenges and prospects. (with G. Lazaridis.) Palgrave Macmillan, 2003.
- Constitution, Law and Rights in the Welfare State ... and beyond, first edition Forlaget Samfundsokonomi & Plaenlaegning, Roskilde, 1995, second edition A. Sakkoulas, Athens, 1998,
- The South European Welfare Model. The Greek Welfare State, in Search of an Identity. In: Journal of European Social Policy February, Band 6, Nr. 1, 1996, S. 39–60.

Political offices
Preceded by Panos Skourletis	Greek Minister for Labour and Social Solidarity; 17 July – 28 August 2015	Succeeded by Dimitris Moustakas
Preceded by Dimitris Moustakas	Greek Minister for Labour and Social Solidarity; 23 September 2015 – 5 November 2016	Succeeded by Effie Achtsioglou
Preceded by Nikos Xydakis	Alternate Minister of Foreign Affairs; 5 November 2016 – 15 February 2019	Succeeded by Sia Anagnostopoulou
Preceded by Alexis Tsipras	Minister of Foreign Affairs; 15 February – 8 July 2019	Succeeded by Nikos Dendias
