= Sia Anagnostopoulou =

Greek politician and academic (born 1959)

- Σία Αναγνωστοπούλου
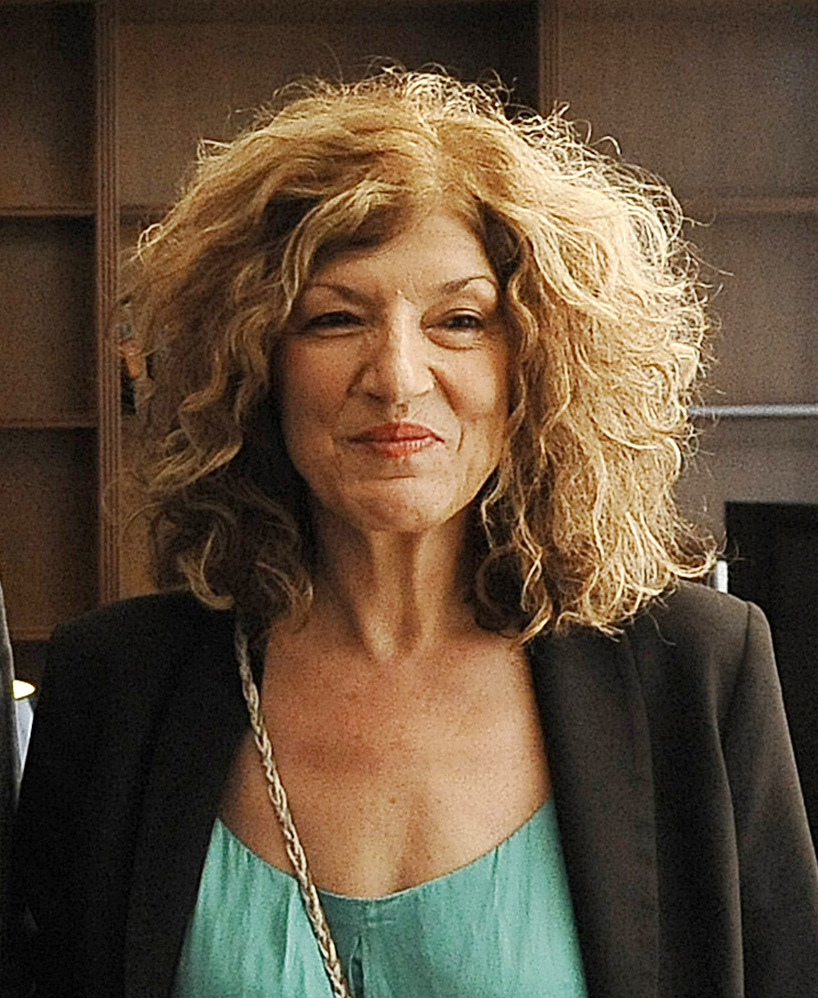

Alternate Minister of Foreign Affairs
- In office 18 February 2019 – 8 July 2019
- Prime Minister: Alexis Tsipras
- Preceded by: Georgios Katrougalos
- Succeeded by: Miltiadis I. Varvitsiotis

Alternate Minister of Education, Research and Religious Affairs
- In office 23 September 2015 – 5 November 2016
- Prime Minister: Alexis Tsipras

Alternate Minister for European Affairs
- In office 18 July 2015 – 28 August 2015
- Prime Minister: Alexis Tsipras
- Preceded by: Nikolaos Chountis
- Succeeded by: Spyridon Flogaitis

Member of the Hellenic Parliament for Achaea
- Incumbent
- Assumed office 25 January 2015

Personal details
- Born: March 1959 (age 67) Patras, Greece
- Party: New Left (since December 2023)
- Other political affiliations: Syriza (until November 2023)
- Education: University of Athens; INALCO; Pantheon-Sorbonne University; EHESS

Athanasia "Sia" Anagnostopoulou (Greek: Αθανασία "Σία" Αναγνωστοπούλου; born March 1959) is a left-wing Greek politician and academic who was the Alternate Minister of Foreign Affairs in the Second Cabinet of Alexis Tsipras. From 18 July to 28 August 2015, she served as the Alternate Minister for European Affairs in the First Cabinet of Alexis Tsipras.

Anagnostopoulou is an associate professor of history at the Panteion University (since 2004), and has been a visiting professor at the New York University, the University of Cyprus and the School for Advanced Studies in the Social Sciences.

== Early life and education ==
Anagnostopoulou was born in Patras in 1959. She attended the 4th Lyceum of Patras before moving to Athens.

Anagnostopoulou studied at the Department of Byzantine and Modern Greek Studies, of the Faculty of Philosophy at the University of Athens. She continued her studies in Paris, where she received two degrees. Firstly, a degree in Turkish language and culture from the Institut National des Langues et Civilisations Orientales (INALCO), and secondly a DEA in Histoire et Civilisations from the Pantheon-Sorbonne University.

She completed her PhD in history at the School for Advanced Studies in the Social Sciences (EHESS) in 1993.

== Academic career ==
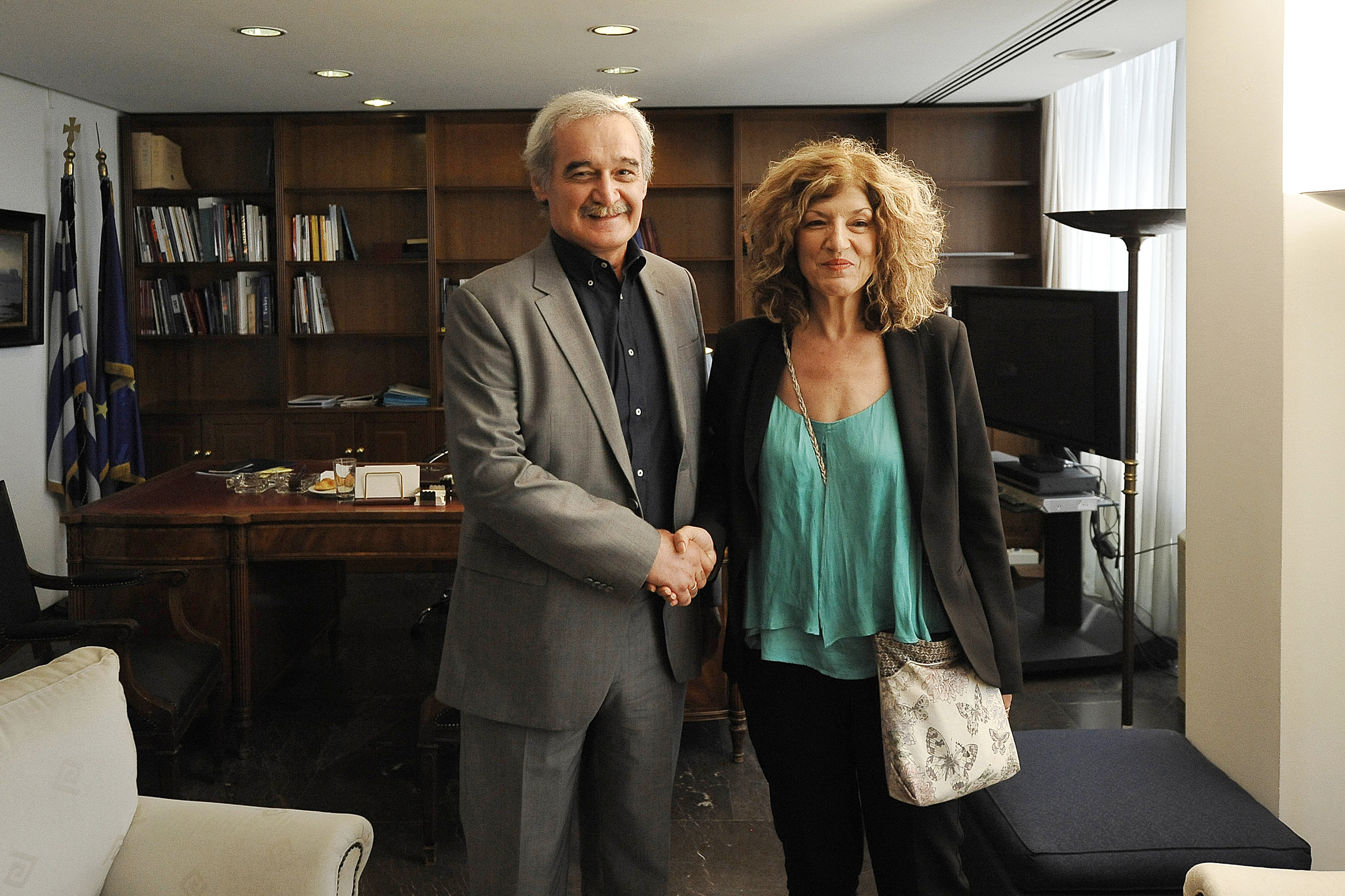
Anagnostopoulou with her predecessor as Alternate Minister, Nikolaos Chountis.

Anagnostopoulou taught for nine years, from 1995 to 2004, at the Turkish and Middle Eastern Studies Department of the University of Cyprus, and since 2004 she has taught in the Panteion University’s Political Science and History Department. She is currently an associate professor of history at the Panteion.

She has taught as a visiting professor at many universities in Europe and America, and she has published extensively. She was a visiting professor at New York University in 2000, at the University of Cyprus from 2008 to 2009, and at the School for Advanced Studies in the Social Sciences in 2011. Her main research interests are nationalism in Greece, Turkey and Cyprus, and colonialism in Cyprus.

From 2000 to 2003, Anagnostopoulou headed the Cypriot Foreign Ministry's research team on issues concerning Turkey and the Turkish-Cypriot community. She is currently on the board of the Greek Contemporary Social History Archives (ASKI), and is on the editorial board of The History (Greek: Τα Ιστορικά), an academic journal.

== Political career ==
Anagnostopoulou was elected as a Syriza Member of the Hellenic Parliament for Achaea at the January 2015 Greek legislative election. She sits on the Standing Committee on National Defense and Foreign Affairs and on the Committee on European Affairs.

On 18 July 2015, Anagnostopoulou was appointed as the Alternate Minister for European Affairs, succeeding Nikolaos Chountis, who had resigned on 13 July. Following the appointment of the Second Cabinet of Alexis Tsipras, Anagnostopoulou was made the Alternate Minister of Education, Research and Religious Affairs.

== Personal life ==
Anagnostopoulou is fluent in four languages: Greek, French, Turkish, and English.

== Works ==
=== Books ===
- The Turkish Modernization: The Tortuous Path of Kemalism (Ο Τουρκικός Εκσυγχρονισμός. Η δαιδαλώδης διαδρομή του Κεμαλισμού, Vivliorama, Athens: 2004)
- The Passage from the Ottoman Empire to the Nation-States: The Case of Greece and Cyprus (Isis Press, Istanbul: 2004)
- Asia Minor: The Greek Orthodox Communities, 19th Century - 1919 (Μικρά Ασία. Οι Ελληνορθόδοξες κοινότητες, 19ος-1919, Εllinika Grammata, Athens: 1997), ISBN 9603444200

=== Articles and papers ===
- "The Complexities of Greek Nationalism in its Cypriot Version" (A. Aktar, N. Kizilyurek, and Umut Özkirimli (ed.), Nationalism in the Troubled Triangle: Cyprus, Greece and Turkey, MacMillan, 2010)
- "The ‘Nation’ of the Rum Sings of the Sultan: The Many Faces of Ottomanism" (L. Tanatar Baruh and V. Kechriotis (ed.), Economy and Society on Both Shores of the Aegean, Alpha Bank Historical Archives, 2010, pp. 79–105)
- "The Europeanisation and de-Europeanisation of Islam", (H. Yilmaz and Cagla Aykac (ed.), Perceptions of Islam in Europe, Tauris, London, 2009)
- "The Complexities of Greek Nationalism and Turkish Cypriots for their Release" ("Les complexités du nationalisme Grec et Turc à leur version Chypriote"; F. Tsimpiridou and D. Stamatopoulos (ed.), Οrientalism aux limites: De l’Empire Ottoman au Moyen Orient contemporaine, Κritiki, Athens, 2008, pp. 35–62)
- "1919-1922: The Ethnarchismos of the Ecumenical Patriarchate in the Frame of the Great Idea" ("1919-1922: Ο εθναρχισμός του Οικουμενικού Πατριαρχείου στο πλαίσιο της Μεγάλης Ιδέας"; Istorica, Volume 25, (47/2007), pp. 373–420.)
- "Bin Yasa Padisahimiz: The Millet-i Rum Singing the Praises of the Sultan in the Framework of Helleno-Ottomanism" (Archivum Ottomanicum: Mélanges en l’honneur d’Elizabeth A. Zachariadou, Harrassowitz Verlag, Wiesbaden, 2006, pp. 47–78)
- "The problem of identities in the second half of the 20th century in Cyprus", (G. Bellingeri and M. Kappler (ed.), Cipro oggi, Casa Editrice Il Ponte, Venice, 2005, pp. 57–65)
