= Bob's your uncle =

British phrase

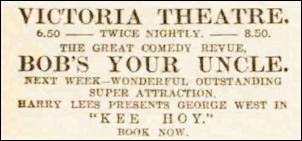
Early appearance of "Bob's your uncle" in print, an advertisement in the Dundee Evening Telegraph on 19 June 1924

"Bob's your uncle" is an idiom commonly used in the United Kingdom and Commonwealth countries that means "and there it is", "and there you have it" or "it's done". Typically, someone says it to conclude a set of simple instructions or when a result is reached. The meaning is similar to that of the French expression "et voilà!".

== Origin ==
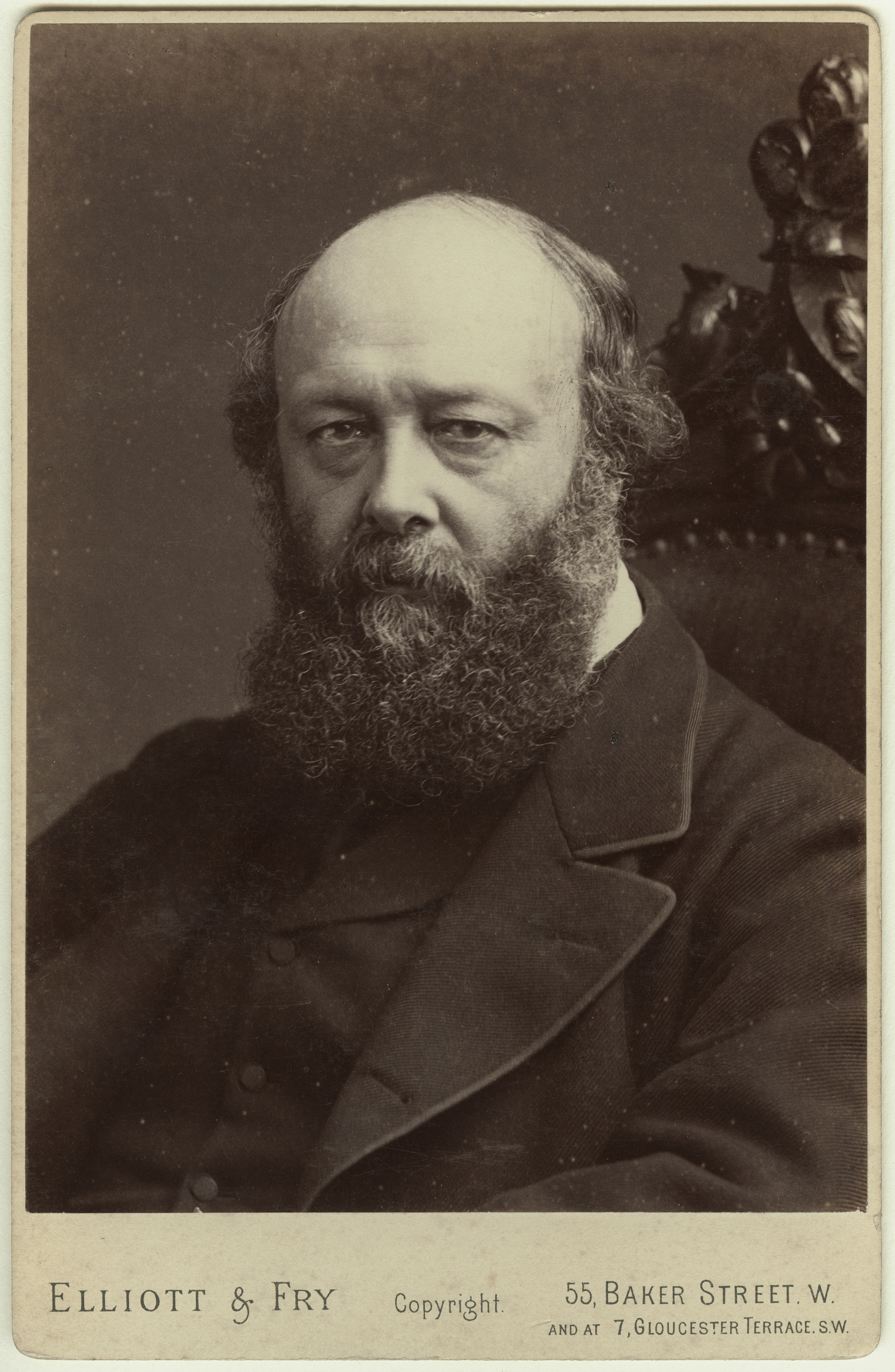
Robert "Bob" Cecil

The origins are uncertain, but a common hypothesis is that the expression arose after Conservative Prime Minister Robert Gascoyne-Cecil, 3rd Marquess of Salisbury ("Bob"), appointed his nephew Arthur Balfour as Chief Secretary for Ireland in 1887, an act of nepotism, which was apparently both surprising and unpopular. Whatever other qualifications Balfour might have had, "Bob's your uncle" was seen as the conclusive one.

A suggested weakness in this hypothesis is that the first documented usage of "Bob's Your Uncle" is in the title of a new song in an advertisement for Herman Darewski Music Publishing Co., published in The Stage (London) on 11 January 1923. In one author's opinion, if Salisbury's notorious nepotism toward Balfour in the 1880s had been so widely spoken of to inspire a popular phrase, it is unlikely that it would have taken nearly forty years for it to appear in print for the first time.

== See also ==
- Garnet Wolseley, 1st Viscount Wolseley, inspiration for "everything's all Sir Garnet"
