= Bakoyannis =

Bakoyannis (or Bakoyiannis; Greek: Μπακογιάννης) with the female form being Bakoyanni (or Bakoyianni; Μπακογιάννη) is a Greek surname. It is the surname of:

- Dora Bakoyannis (born 1954), Greek politician and government minister
- Kostas Bakoyannis (born 1978), Greek politician and regional governor
- Niki Bakoyianni (born 1968), Greek high-jumper
- Pavlos Bakoyannis (1935–1989), Greek politician and parliamentary leader
