= Mitsotakis =

Mitsotakis is a Greek surname. Notable people with the surname include:

- Maria Mitsotáki (1907–1974), Athens socialite and a principal character in epic poem The Changing Light at Sandover
- Konstantinos Mitsotakis (1918–2017), Greek Prime Minister from 1990 to 1993
- Dora Bakoyannis (née Mitsotakis) (born 1954), politician and Greek Foreign Minister; daughter of Prime Minister Konstantinos Mitsotakis
- Mareva Grabowski-Mitsotakis (born 1967), Greek business executive
- Kyriakos Mitsotakis (born 1968) Greek Prime Minister since 2019; son of Konstantinos Mitsotakis
