= Theodoros Flogaitis =

Greek jurist, politician and author

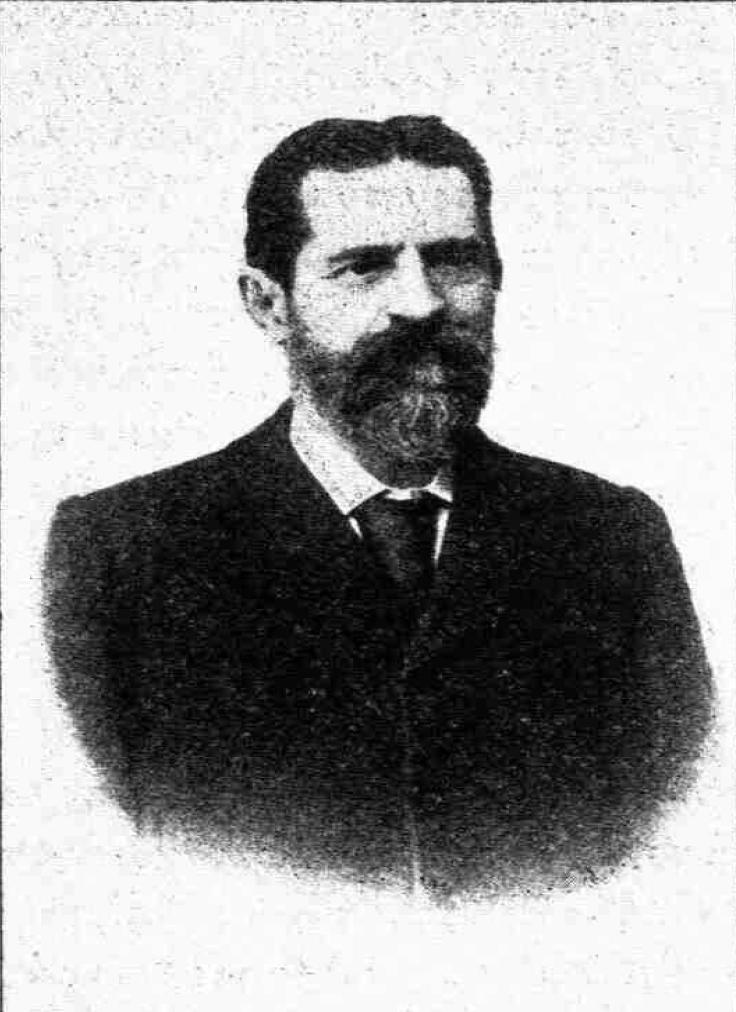
Theodore Flogaitis

Theodoros Flogaitis (Greek: Θεόδωρος Φλογαΐτης; 1840/48–1905) was a Greek jurist, politician and author.

== Early life ==
Flogaitis was born in Nafplio in either 1840 or 1848. His father was Nikolaos Flogaitis.

== Career ==
Flogaitis was the director of the newspaper, Syntagmatikos Ellin ("Constitutional Greek"), which was active in the aftermath of the October 1862 revolution that ousted King Otto of Greece. He later became a practising lawyer in Chalcis, before moving to Athens to lecture in constitutional law. In 1879 he was elected as an MP for Chalcis, and was a political opponent of Alexandros Koumoundouros. In 1890, he was elected to represent Euboea. He became a columnist and was later proposed as a professor of law, but turned it down to continue journalism. He wrote several books on law in Greece and around the world.

== Personal life ==
Flogaitis was the grandson of another Theodoros Flogaitis, the first mayor of Odessa. His nephew, Ioannis Flogaitis, was a politician in Lefkada, and one of his sons was Spyridon Flogaitis.
