= Spyridon Flogaitis =

Greek lawyer (born 1950)

Spyridon Flogaitis Σπυρίδων Φλογαΐτης
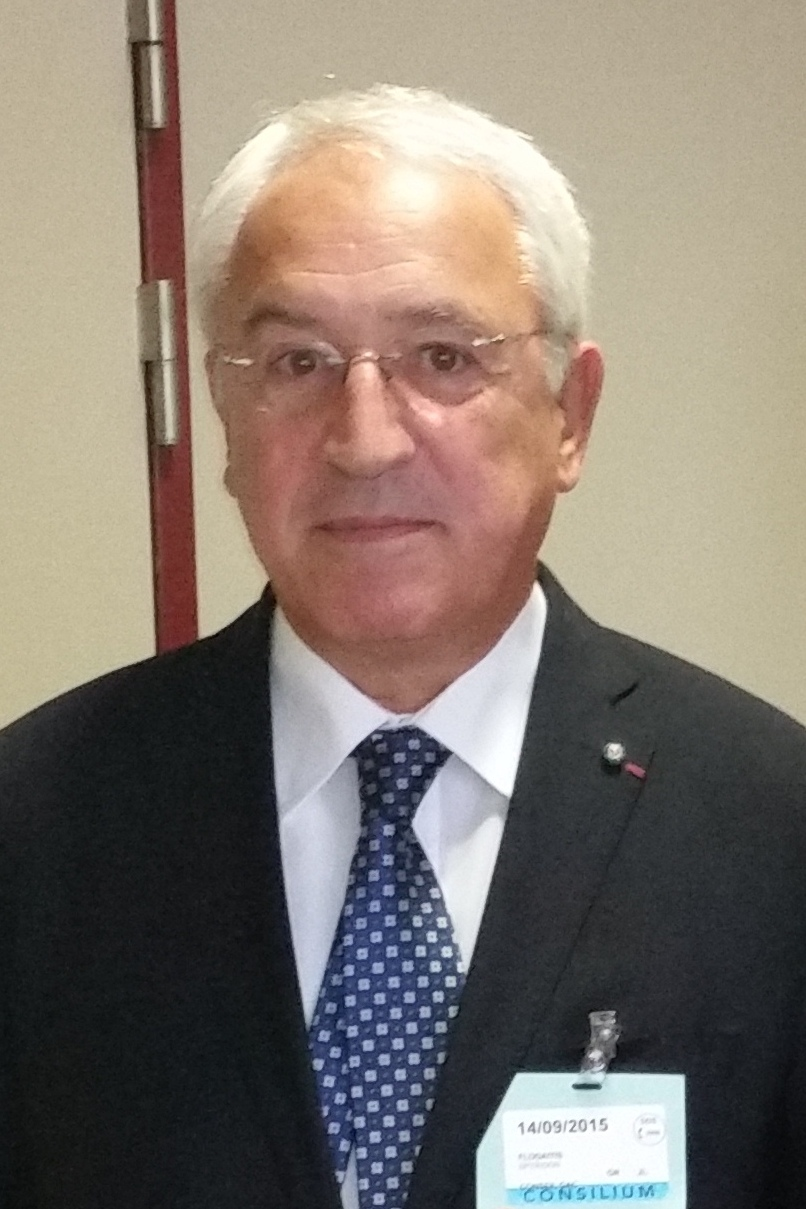

Alternate Minister of European Affairs
- In office 28 August 2015 – 23 September 2015
- President: Prokopis Pavlopoulos
- Prime Minister: Vassiliki Thanou-Christophilou; Alexis Tsipras
- Preceded by: Sia Anagnostopoulou
- Succeeded by: Nikos Xydakis

Minister of the Interior Minister of the Interior, Public Administration and Decentralization (2007)
- In office 24 August 2007 – 19 September 2007
- Preceded by: Position established
- Succeeded by: Prokopis Pavlopoulos

Personal details
- Born: 22 July 1950 (age 76) Lefkada, Greece
- Party: Independent
- Spouse: Photini Pazartzis
- Education: University of Athens; Panthéon-Assas University; Pantheon-Sorbonne University

Spyridon Flogaitis (Greek: Σπυρίδων Φλογαΐτης; born 22 July 1950), is a Greek lawyer, jurist and academic who is currently a professor of public law at the University of Athens. He is the editor and founder of numerous legal journals, and is also a judge in the Greek Council of State.

Flogaitis has formerly served as an Alternate Minister of European Affairs in the Caretaker Cabinet of Vassiliki Thanou-Christophilou. He has also formerly served as an interim Minister of the Interior in 2007.

== Early life and education ==
Flogaitis was born in Lefkada to Ioannis Flogaitis.

In 1968, Flogaitis received his high school diploma from the 5th High School of Athens. In 1973, he received an undergraduate degree in law from the University of Athens. From 1973 to 1974, he completed a Diplôme d'études supérieures in public law at the Panthéon-Assas University. Flogaitis then completed a law doctorate at Panthéon-Assas in 1978, under the directorship of Jean Rivero. His thesis title was: "La notion de décentralisation en France, en Allemagne et en Italie". He also completed a doctorate in history in 1978 at the Pantheon-Sorbonne University, under the directorship of Nicolas Svoronos. His thesis subject was: "Système vénitien de successions ab intestat et structures familiales dans les îles ioniennes".

== Academic career ==
From 1980 to 1982, Flogaitis was an assistant in the faculty of law at the University of Athens. From 1982 to 1985, he was a lecturer in the department, before becoming an associate professor in 1985. From 1992 to presently, he has been a professor of public law in the department.

In 1993, Flogaitis became a member of the board of the Ionian University. In 1994, he co-founded Critical Review of Legal Theory and Practice alongside Michael Stathopoulos, and became its first editor. Also in 1994, he co-founded the Greek journal, Environment and Law, alongside Gl Sioutis and J Karakostas. In 1995, he became the first director of the European Public Law Center, and stayed in that role until 2007. In 2004, he co-founded, in Greek Energy and Law, alongside Gl Sioutis. In 2006, he founded the Journal of Administrative Law, and became its first editor.

== Legal career ==
Since 1974, Flogaitis has been an attorney-at-law at the Athens Bar. From 1981 to 1982, Flogaitis was Assistant to the Legal Advisor to the Prime Minister of Greece, who at the time was Andreas Papandreou. In 1984, Flogaitis became an attorney in the Council of State. In 2011, Flogaitis became a judge in the Council of State.

In 1990, Flogaitis founded Flogaitis-Sioutis Law Firm alongside Glykeria Sioutis, a prestigious firm with a Greek and International clientele.

In 1985, Flogaitis served as the director of the Institute of Public Administration, part of the National Centre for Public Administration and Local Government. Since 2007, Flogaitis has been a member of the board of directors of the Hellenic Foundation for Culture.

Since 2011, Flogaitis has been a member of the Appeals Board of the European Space Agency, and since 2013 he has been vice president of the board.

From 2000 to 2009, he was a member of the United Nations Administrative Tribunal, and from 2004 to 2005, served as a vice president of the tribunal. From 2006 to 2009, he was president of the tribunal.

== Political career ==
Flogaitis has twice served as an interim Greek Minister of the Interior, once in the run-up to the 2007 legislative election and once in the run-up to the 2009 legislative election. On 28 August 2015, Flogaitis was appointed the interim Alternate Minister of European Affairs in the caretaker cabinet of Vassiliki Thanou-Christophilou.

== Personal life ==
Flogaitis is the nephew of Theodoros Flogaitis, a politician and professor of constitutional law, and the great nephew Nikolaos Flogaitis, a judge of the Greek supreme court. In turn, Nikolaos's father, Theodoros Flogaitis, was elected as the first Mayor of Odessa in 1796.

Flogaitis is married to Photini Pazartzis, an associate professor of international law at the University of Athens.

== Honours ==
Flogaitis is one of only a few foreign recipients of the Legion of Honour, having received the degree of Chevalier. He is also a Knight of the Order of Merit of the Italian Republic.
