= Nikos Xydakis (journalist) =

Greek journalist, art critic, and politician

Nikos Xydakis MP
- Νίκος Ξυδάκης
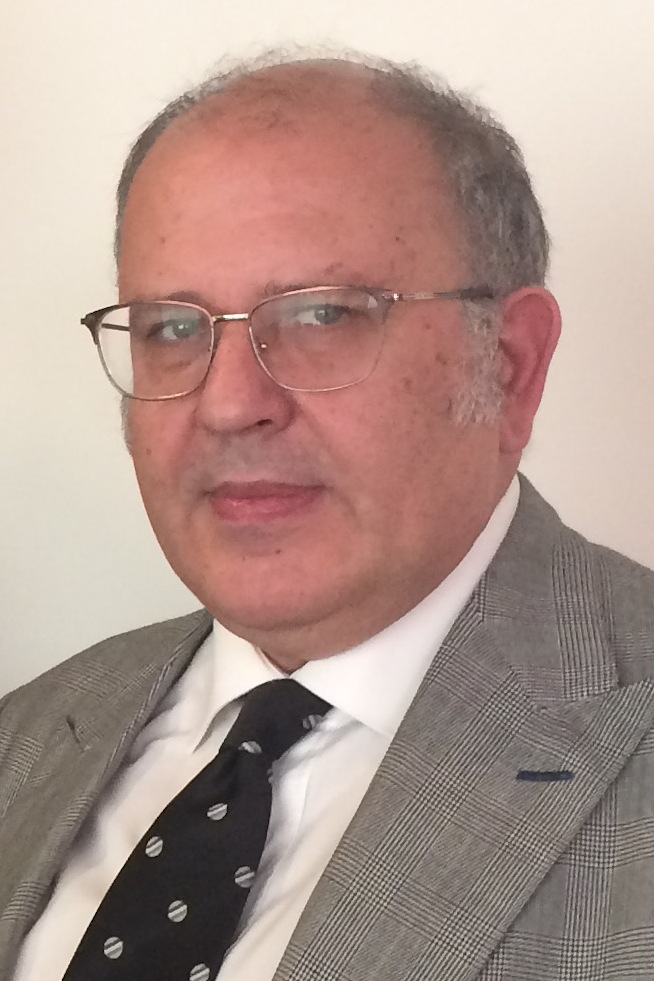

Alternate Foreign Minister
- In office 23 September 2015 – 5 November 2016
- Prime Minister: Alexis Tsipras
- Minister: Nikos Kotzias
- Preceded by: Spyridon Flogaitis
- Succeeded by: Georgios Katrougalos

Alternate Minister for Culture
- In office 27 January 2015 – 27 August 2015
- Prime Minister: Alexis Tsipras
- Minister: Aristides Baltas
- Preceded by: Konstantinos Tasoulas (as Minister for Culture)
- Succeeded by: Marina Lambraki-Plaka

Personal details
- Born: 1958 (age 67–68) Piraeus, Greece
- Party: Syriza
- Education: University of Athens
- Profession: Journalist

Nikos Xydakis (Greek: Νίκος Ξυδάκης; born 1958) is a Greek journalist, art critic, and left-wing politician. From 27 January to 28 August 2015, he served as the Alternate Minister for Culture in the cabinet of Alexis Tsipras. From 23 September 2015 to 5 November 2016, he served as the Alternate Foreign Minister for European Affairs.

== Biography ==
Xydakis was born in Piraeus in 1958. He studied graphic arts at the Technological Educational Institute of Athens from 1976 to 1977 before attaining a degree in dentistry from the University of Athens in 1984, where he later went on to pursue postgraduate studies in history of art from 1998 to 2002.

Having joined Kathimerini in 1992, Xydakis became arts editor of the newspaper in 1999 and subsequently editor-in-chief from 2003 to 2014. He received an award from the Athanassios Botsis Journalism Foundation in 2009. From 2002 to 2005 he was General Secretary of the Greek section of the International Association of Art Critics.

In the January 2015 election, Xydakis stood as a candidate for the Coalition of the Radical Left (SYRIZA). He was elected MP for the Athens B constituency, and following the formation of a Syriza-led coalition government under Alexis Tsipras, Xydakis was appointed Alternate Minister of Culture in the combined Ministry of Culture, Education and Religious Affairs, serving under Aristides Baltas.

The Syriza–ANEL coalition resigned on the 20 August 2015 and remained in office until a caretaker cabinet led by Vassiliki Thanou was appointed. Speaking to the Observer before the September 2015 election, Xydakis said: "We have all aged. It seems like years since we were elected, and yet it was only months ago. So much has happened, events have been so big, it has almost been too much for anyone to take in."

He was re-elected to parliament for the Athens B electoral district in the second election of 2015, but failed to win re-election at the 2019 election.
