= Nikos Kotzias =

Greek politician and academic

Nikolaos Kotzias
- Νικόλαος Κοτζιάς
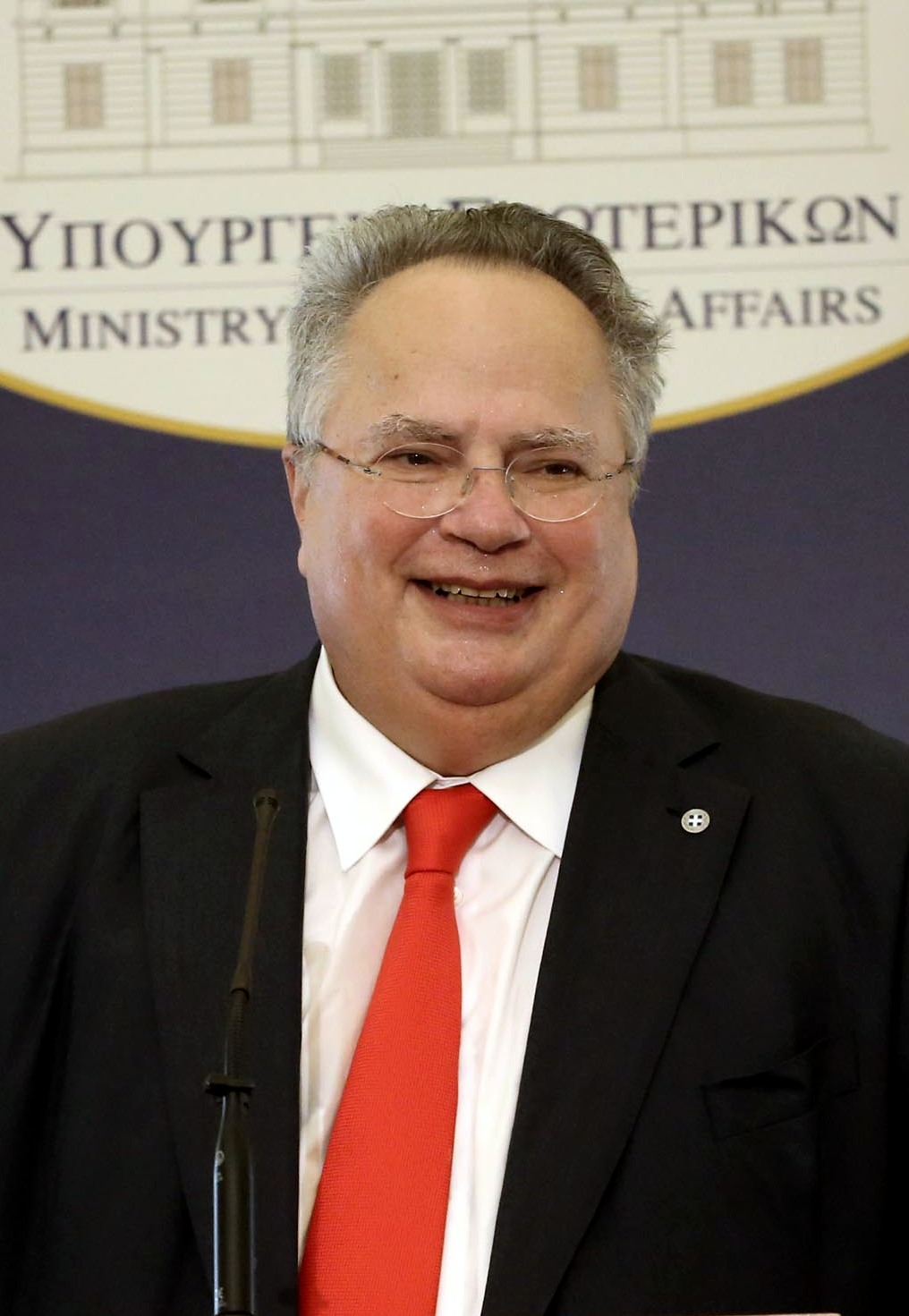

Minister for Foreign Affairs
- In office 23 September 2015 – 20 October 2018
- Prime Minister: Alexis Tsipras
- Preceded by: Petros Molyviatis
- Succeeded by: Alexis Tsipras (Acting)
- In office 27 January 2015 – 28 August 2015
- Prime Minister: Alexis Tsipras
- Preceded by: Evangelos Venizelos
- Succeeded by: Petros Molyviatis

Personal details
- Born: 21 December 1950 (age 75) Athens, Greece
- Party: Syriza
- Education: University of Giessen
- Website: Official website

Nikolaos Kotzias, GCM (Greek: Νικόλαος Κοτζιάς; born 21 December 1950) is a Greek politician and diplomat who served as Minister for Foreign Affairs from 2015 to 2018.

He was Foreign Minister from 23 September 2015 until his resignation on 17 October 2018; previously he held the same post from 27 January to 28 August 2015. Nominated by SYRIZA, he was sworn in as a member of the Cabinet of Prime Minister Alexis Tsipras in January 2015.

== Early life and career ==
Kotzias studied economics (Diploma) and Political Science and Philosophy (MA) in Athens and Law and Politics of European Integration (PhD and Post-doc) at the University of Giessen in Germany. According to his online biography worked as a researcher and taught at the Universities of Marburg, Oxford and Cambridge and he holds from 2008 on the position of Professor of Political Theories and International and European Studies at the University of Piraeus. He has specialized in issues of policy and political systems, societies and foreign policy of Brazil, India and Russia. He has been a member of many globally recognized international research teams on contemporary issues.

In addition to numerous other publications, he wrote 24 scientific books, published the German philosopher in the tradition of critical theory Jürgen Habermas in Greece and also released a collection of poems

== Political career ==
Kotzias was active as a student in the Lambrakis Democratic Youth and during the right-wing military dictatorship in Greece was a member of the Communist Youth of Greece. He was a secretary of the Federation of Greek Fraternities in Germany as well as the coordination point of the anti-dictatorship student organizations. Later he was a member of the Central Committee of the Communist Party of Greece and was repeatedly condemned by military courts. During his years in the Greek Communist Party, he became the party's ideological instructor. He was often praised for his masterful rhetoric and his profound knowledge of Marxist philosophy. During the 1980s, he praised the Polish government's crackdown on the Solidarity movement.

Kotzias broke with the Communist Party after the majority's decision to co-ally with the conservatives in order to bring Prime Minister Andreas Papandreou to trial for corruption. Along with other party members, he characterized that decision as an "unholy alliance" and declared their resignation which subsequently led to the creation of a new leftist group.

He is a founding member of Nikos Poulantzas leftist think tank, which was named after a Franco-Greek, Marxist oriented sociologist and political philosopher.

From 1993 to 2008, he was in the diplomatic service in the Ministry of Foreign Affairs, with the rank of ambassador beginning in 2005. As a chief diplomat, he was involved in negotiations on the Amsterdam Treaty, Agenda 2000, the Greek-Turkish relations and the European Constitution.

Kotzias played an important role during the "spring" of the Greek-Turkish relations in 1999, implementing the "earthquake diplomacy" at the time when the two countries were struck by catastrophic earthquakes. He has supported the Greek-Turkish rapprochement as a new policy doctrine and introduced the confidence-building measures (CBMs).

He was also the Greek representative in the 2002 Helsinki agreement which regulated Turkey's candidacy status for EU membership and paved the way for Cyprus' accession in 2004.

In September 2012, Kotzias founded the progressive and democratic political movement named Pratto, whose purpose is "to form a radical, patriotic, democratic and social movement, advocating the interests of the country, the Greek people, the workers and the Greek natural environment". Current Minister of Public Order and Citizen Protection and MP Nikos Toskas is also a founding member of Pratto.

In one of his interviews in Spiegel Online on 9 February 2015 he noted that he is an atheist.

He speaks Greek, German as native and fluent English.

Since January 2015 Kotzias is Foreign Minister in a cabinet in coalition with Independent Greeks, a right wing conservative party that also opposes austerity.

=== Foreign policy views ===
Nikos Kotzias is an advocate of a multidimensional, energetic and democratic attitude towards foreign policy. He supports the view that even a relatively small state, in terms of economic power, can take advantage of the changes that occur in a global context and increase its capacities to allow it to exercise an autonomous foreign policy according to the national interest. Supporting the view that the world has already begun to move towards multipolarity, Kotzias believes that states that wish to increase their influence and capacities should seek to forge concrete relations with the emerging powers (BRICS).

=== "Debt colony" theory ===
In one of his latest books "The Colony of Debt", Nikos Kotzias claims that the European Union is developing empire characteristics, as it perceives markets, the bureaucracy in Brussels and Germany as focal elements of its structure. In this way, he argues, the EU is rendering in a two-tier region of a rich North and poor South.

=== Minister of Foreign Affairs ===
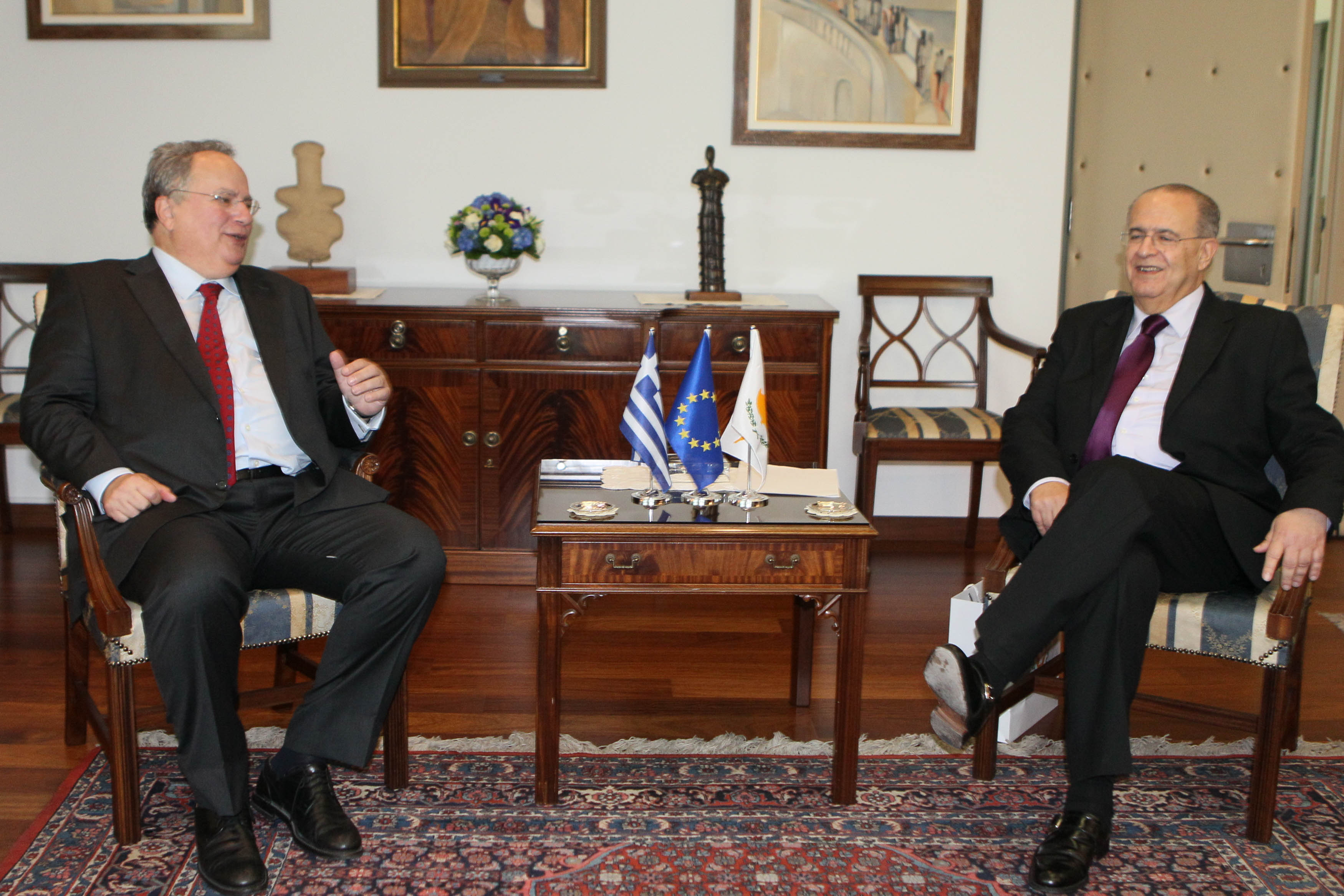
Nikos Kotzias with Foreign Minister of Cyprus Ioannis Kasoulidis

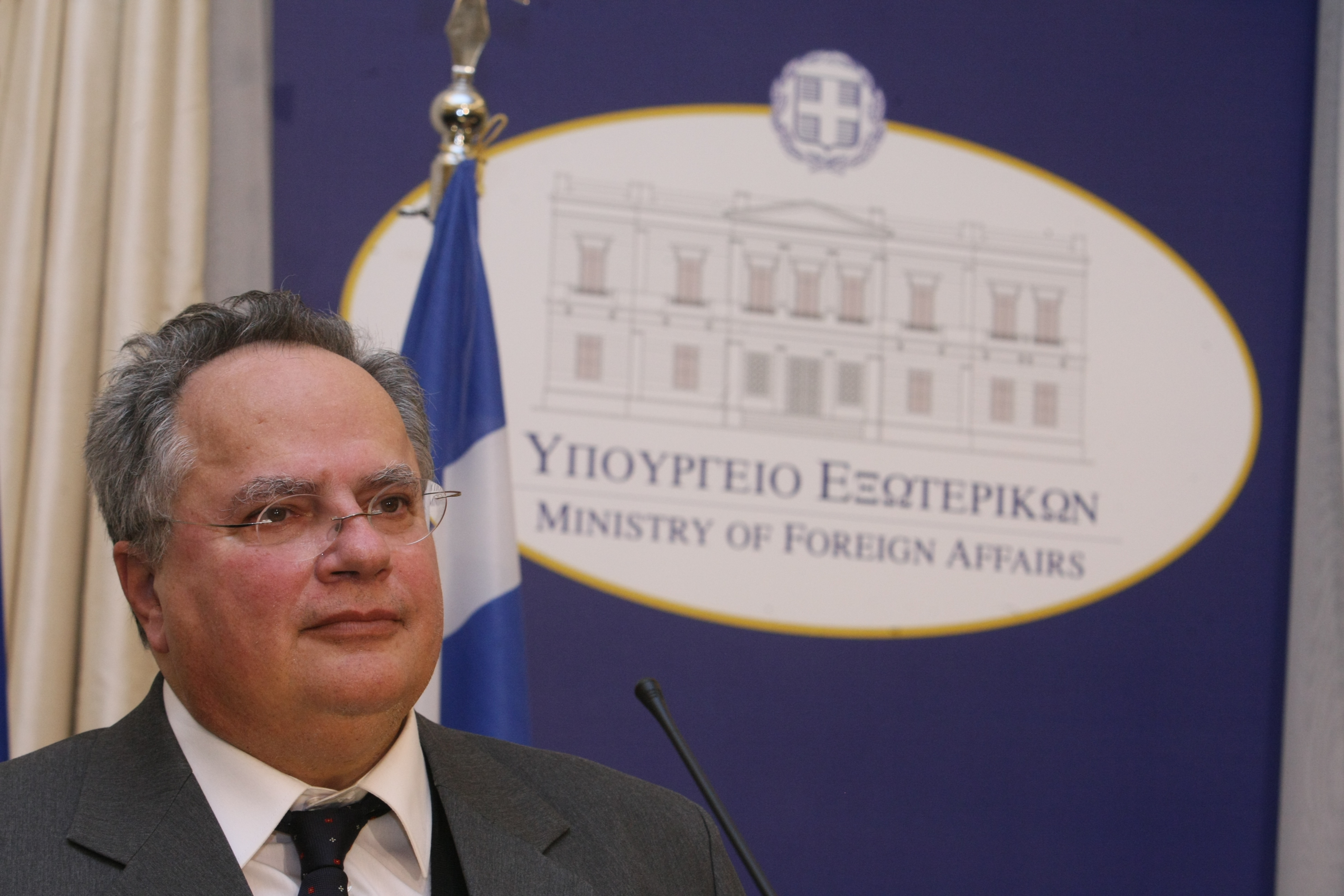
Ministerial handover to Kotzias, January 2015

On 27 January 2015, Nikos Kotzias was appointed as Minister of Foreign Affairs, despite not being a member of parliament. During the ceremony of the handing of the ministry, Kotzias gave a notion of his political approach stating: "We look forward to bridges with the new emerging world. We do not see our membership in European institutions as conflictual to our relations with emerging powers."

In the same night of Kotzias's appointment, the Greek Ministry of Foreign Affairs released a statement, issuing Greece's unwillingness to agree to key passage of statement, delaying agreement for further EU sanctions against Russia-backed separatists in Ukraine, before the extraordinary meeting of the EU Council of Foreign Ministers, which was scheduled on 29 January 2015 in Brussels. The new minister argued that "certain of our partners attempted to present us with a fait accomplis before the new government had even been sworn". He also underlined that Greece "would not relinquish its sovereignty and active contribution to European policy as this would be an act that circumvents a vital principle of Europeanism."

The 29 January meeting resulted to an improved and softened version of the statement, extending the ongoing sanctions but avoiding to include further measures, mainly due to the position that the Greek minister held. Federica Mogherini, the European Union's High Representative for Foreign Affairs and Security Policy, stated that Kotzias's "attitude was extremely constructive" during the meeting and that "this was an extremely positive exercise" which led to "a consensual and substantial decision."

=== Second term as Minister of Foreign Affairs and resignation ===
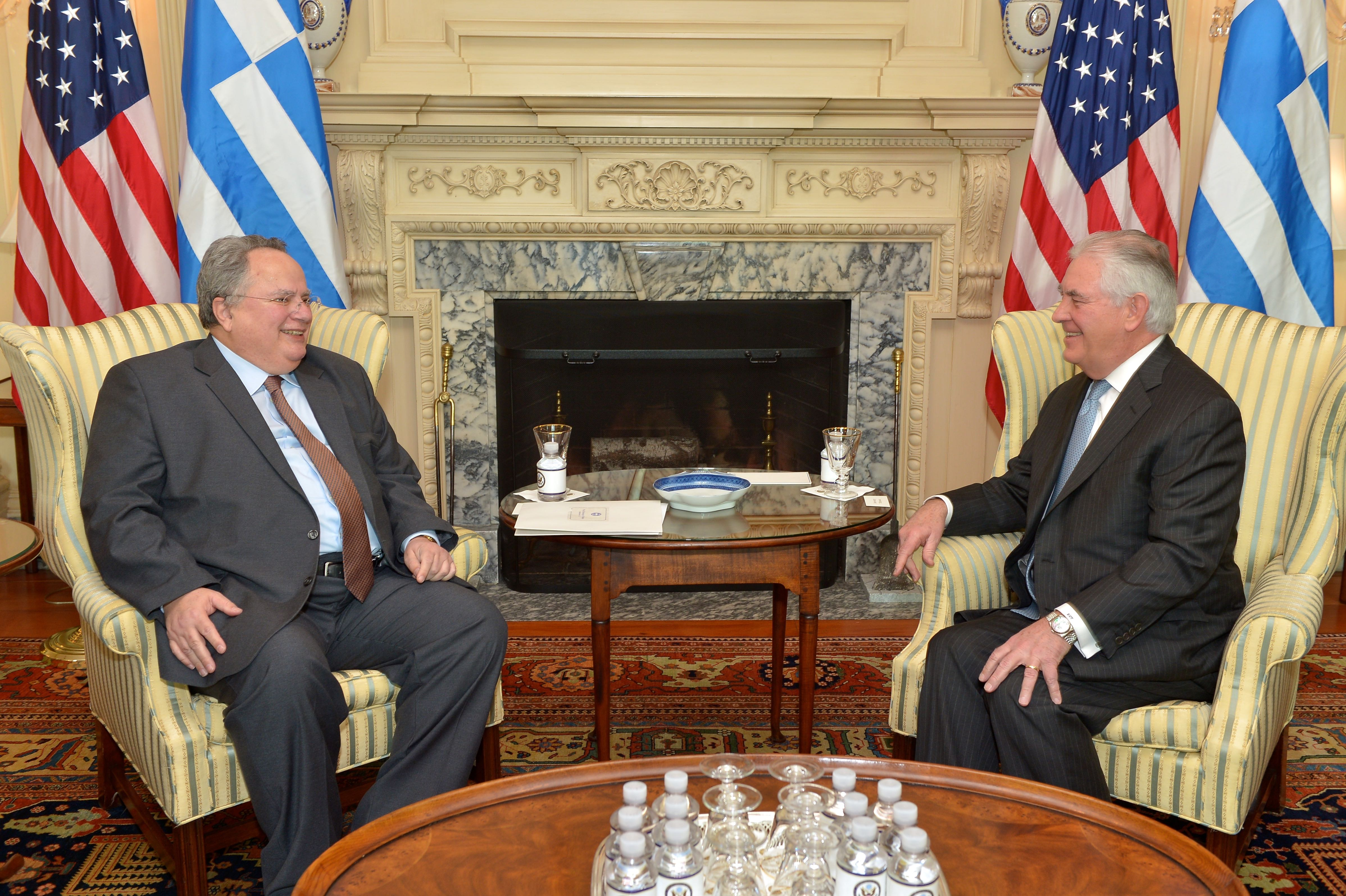
Kotzias with U.S. Secretary of State Rex Tillerson, 13 March 2017

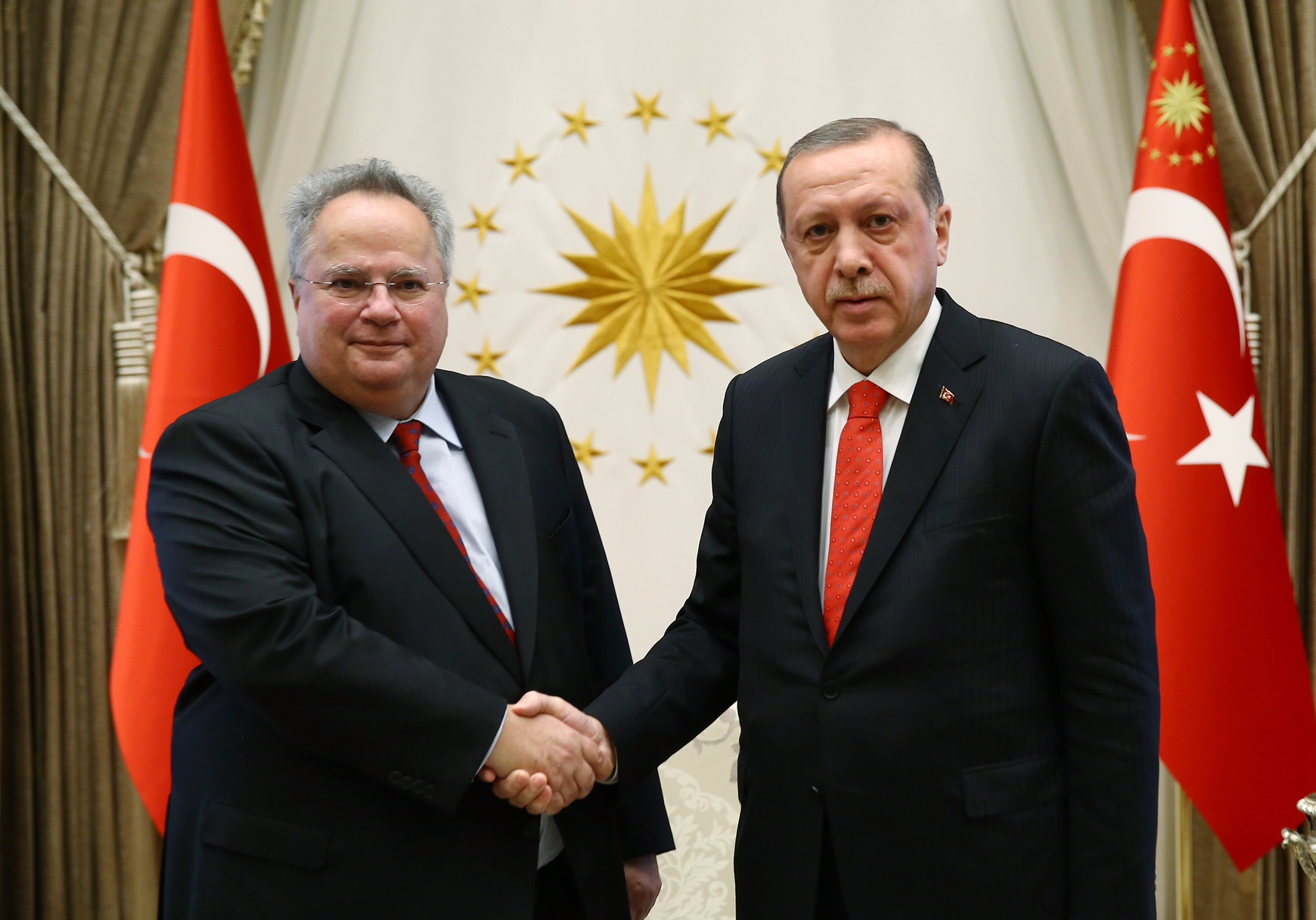
Kotzias with Turkish President Recep Tayyip Erdoğan, 24 October 2017

After the announcement for early legislative elections on 20 September 2015, Nikos Kotzias was nominated as a candidate on SYRIZA national ballots after the agreement of Pratto to co-ally with SYRIZA, and he was elected as a member of the Greek Parliament.

On 23 September 2015, after the formation of a coalition government between SYRIZA and Independent Greeks, Kotzias was appointed as Minister of Foreign Affairs for a second time, succeeding the caretaker minister Petros Molyviatis.

On 17 October 2018 Kotzias submitted his resignation, a day after a cabinet meeting during which he clashed over the Prespa agreement with Defense Minister Panos Kammenos, who has opposed the deal. He was succeeded by then PM Alexis Tsipras.

== Selected books and articles ==
- Poland and Ourselves. Synchroni Epochi (1981)
- Globalization, The historical place and the future. Kastaniotis Publications (2003) ISBN 978-960-03-3505-7
- The active democratic State. Nation State and Globalization (co-written with Petros Liacouras) Kastaniotis Publications (2004) ISBN 960-03-3646-6
- EU–US Relations: Repairing the Transatlantic Rift. (ed. with Petros Liacouras) Palgrave Macmillan (2006) ISBN 1-4039-3520-3
- Beyond high politics: Promise and limits of rapprochement. In: Anastasakis et al.: In the Long Shadow of Europe: Greeks and Turks in the Era of Postnationalism, Brill, 2009, ISBN 978-90-04-17112-1
- Greek Foreign Policy on the 21st Century. For a new, active, democratic strategy in the era of Globalisation Kastaniotis publications (2010) ISBN 978-960-03-5077-7
- The Rescue politics against Troika and the democratic Greece Livanis Publications (2012) ISBN 978-960-14-2488-0
- Greece, a Debt Colony. European Empire and German Primacy Patakis publications (2013) ISBN 978-960-16-4966-5
- Patriotism and the Left Patakis Publications (2014) ISBN 978-960-16-6066-0

== Honours ==
Kotzias has been awarded the following foreign orders:

- Grand Cross of the Order of Merit (Portugal) - 30 January 2017

== See also ==
- List of foreign ministers in 2017
- List of current foreign ministers

Political offices
Preceded by Evangelos Venizelos	Minister of Foreign Affairs; 2015	Succeeded by Petros Molyviatis
Preceded by Petros Molyviatis	Minister of Foreign Affairs; 2015–2018	Succeeded by Alexis Tsipras
