= Petros Molyviatis =

Greek politician and diplomat (1928–2025)

Petros Molyviatis Πέτρος Μολυβιάτης
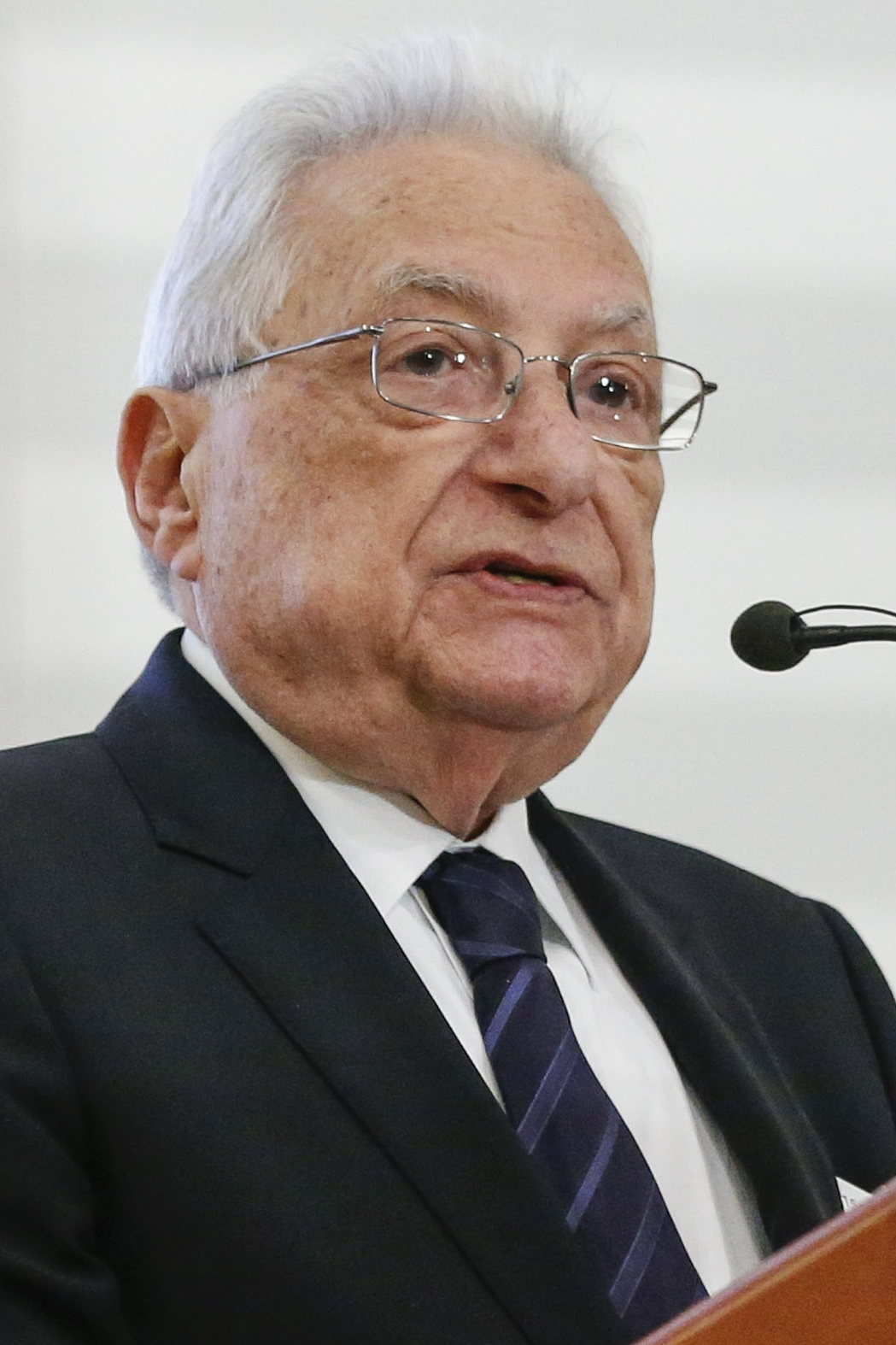
- Molyviatis in 2013

Minister for Foreign Affairs
- In office 28 August 2015 – 23 September 2015
- Prime Minister: Vassiliki Thanou-Christophilou
- Preceded by: Nikos Kotzias
- Succeeded by: Nikos Kotzias
- In office 17 May 2012 – 21 June 2012
- Prime Minister: Panayiotis Pikrammenos
- Preceded by: Stavros Dimas
- Succeeded by: Dimitris Avramopoulos
- In office 10 March 2004 – 15 February 2006
- Prime Minister: Kostas Karamanlis
- Preceded by: Tassos Yiannitsis
- Succeeded by: Dora Bakoyannis

Personal details
- Born: 12 June 1928 Chios, Greece
- Died: 4 May 2025 (aged 96) Athens, Greece
- Party: New Democracy
- Education: University of Athens

Petros G. Molyviatis (Greek: Πέτρος Γ. Μολυβιάτης; 12 June 1928 – 4 May 2025) was a Greek politician and diplomat who served three times as Minister for Foreign Affairs from 2004 to 2006, May to June 2012, and August to September 2015.

From 28 August to 23 September 2015, was the Minister for Foreign Affairs in the caretaker cabinet of Vassiliki Thanou-Christophilou. He had previously served as Minister for Foreign Affairs from 17 May to 21 June 2012 in the caretaker cabinet of Panayiotis Pikrammenos, and from 10 March 2004 to 15 February 2006 in the first cabinet of Kostas Karamanlis.

== Early life and education ==
Born in Chios, Molyviatis studied Law at the National and Kapodistrian University of Athens and entered the Greek Foreign Ministry after graduation. His mother Agapi was the sister of the writer Elias Venezis and came from Ayvalik in Asia Minor.

== Career ==
As a career diplomat, he served in the Permanent Delegation of Greece to the United Nations in New York and NATO in Brussels. He also served in the Greek embassies in Moscow, Pretoria and Ankara. From 1974 to 1980, Molyviatis was diplomatic advisor and director general of the political cabinet of Prime Minister Constantine Karamanlis. During the terms of office of Constantine Karamanlis as Greek president from 1980 to 1985 and 1990 to 1995, he was secretary general of the Presidential office.

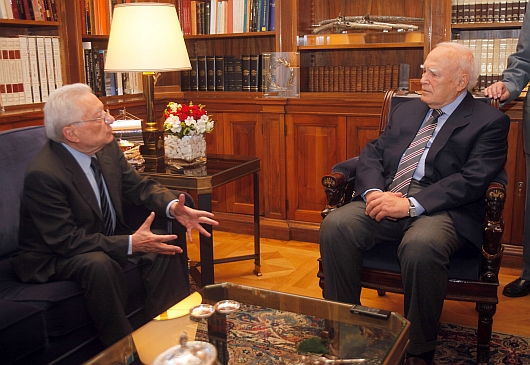
Molyviatis with then-President of Greece Karolos Papoulias.

In the 1996 and 2000 legislative elections he was elected a member of the Greek parliament for the New Democracy party. He was appointed Greek Foreign Minister in May 2004 following the victory of New Democracy party in the legislative election of 7 March 2004. As Minister for Foreign Affairs, Molyviatis was a signatory to the Treaty establishing a Constitution for Europe, which was never fully ratified and never entered into force.

His name was mentioned as a potential candidate for prime minister of Greece of the coalition government decided between government and opposition in November 2011.

From 17 May to 21 June 2012, he served again as Minister for Foreign Affairs in the caretaker cabinet of Panayiotis Pikrammenos. Molyviatis was again appointed, on 28 August 2015, as an interim Minister for Foreign Affairs in the caretaker cabinet of Vassiliki Thanou-Christophilou.

== Personal life and death ==
Molyviatis spoke English and French. He was chairman of the Konstantinos Karamanlis Foundation. Molyviatis was married and had one daughter and one son.

Molyviatis died from respiratory failure at a hospital in Athens, on 4 May 2025, at the age of 96.

Political offices
| Preceded by Tassos Yiannitsis | Minister of Foreign Affairs; 2004–2006 | Succeeded by Dora Bakoyannis |
| Preceded by Stavros Dimas | Minister of Foreign Affairs (caretaker); 2012 | Succeeded by Dimitris Avramopoulos |
| Preceded by Nikos Kotzias | Minister of Foreign Affairs (caretaker); 2015 | Succeeded by Nikos Kotzias |
