= Chase Johnsey =

American ballet dancer

- Born: Winter Haven, Florida
- Education: Lois Cowles Harrison Center for the Visual and Performing Arts
- Occupation: Ballet dancer
- Spouse: Carlos Renedo (m. 2015; div. 2024)
- Career
- Former groups: Les Ballets Trockadero de Monte Carlo, English National Ballet

Chase Johnsey is an American ballet dancer. He is the co-founding and current Artistic Director of Ballet de Barcelona. He was a former principal dancer with Les Ballets Trockadero de Monte Carlo and a former first artist with the English National Ballet. Johnsey, who identifies as genderfluid but uses he/him pronouns, is reportedly the first male dancer to join the female ensemble of an international ballet company.

== Early life and training ==
Johnsey was born in Winter Haven, Florida. As a child he competed in national dance competitions for American clogging. He took his first classical ballet class at the age of fourteen. He was discouraged by his teachers in pursuing a career in classical ballet due to his effeminate physical features and slender, short build which differed from the masculine, "heroic" physique typically required for men in ballet. Despite discouragement, Johnsey continued to pursue a career in classical ballet. He trained at Virginia School of the Arts, Lois Cowles Harrison Center for the Visual and Performing Arts, and Florida Dance Theatre.

== Career ==
In 2004, Johnsey joined Les Ballets Trockadero de Monte Carlo, an all-male ballet company that performs comedic parodies of classical ballets, often in drag. He performed both male and female roles with the Trocks under the stage names Roland Deaulin and Yakatarina Verbosovitch. He has received critical acclaim for his quick footwork and technique, articulate pointe work, and execution of female roles. He danced the roles of Kitri from Don Quixote, Paquita, and Odette and Odile from Swan Lake.

In 2008, Johnsey was listed in Dance Magazine's 25 to Watch. He also won best male dancer at the National Dance Awards.

On January 1, 2018, Johnsey resigned from Les Ballets Trockadero de Monte Carlo, after a fourteen-year career with the company, on the grounds that he was harassed and humiliated, alleging that the Trocks had discriminated against him and other dancers for appearing too feminine and threatening to end his employment if he should choose to undergo gender transitioning. He claimed that dancers, including himself, were mistreated, sexually harassed, and discriminated against for appearing too feminine in classes and rehearsals and not living up to the company's expectations of what a "gay man is". The Trocks issued a statement denying Johnsey's claims of harassment and discrimination but hired an independent investigator to look into the allegations, which were found by the investigator to be unsubstantiated.

He joined the English National Ballet as a first artist and danced female roles with the company.

In May 2019, he co-founded Ballet de Barcelona, alongside Carlos Renedo and Carolina Masjuan.

== Personal life ==
Johnsey married Spanish ballet dancer Carlos Renedo, at the time a fellow dancer with Les Ballets Trockadero de Monte Carlo, in November 2015.

Johnsey identifies as genderfluid and uses male pronouns. Johnsey underwent facial feminization surgery and worked with a trainer, ballet mistress, and a nutritionist from the English National Ballet to help make changes to his body in order to appear more feminine.

Johnsey and Renedo divorced in March 2024. Johnsey acquired Ballet de Barcelona as part of the divorce settlement, and now acts as CEO, as well as continuing to serve as artistic director.
