= Stavros Dimas =

Greek politician (born 1941)

- Σταύρος Δήμας
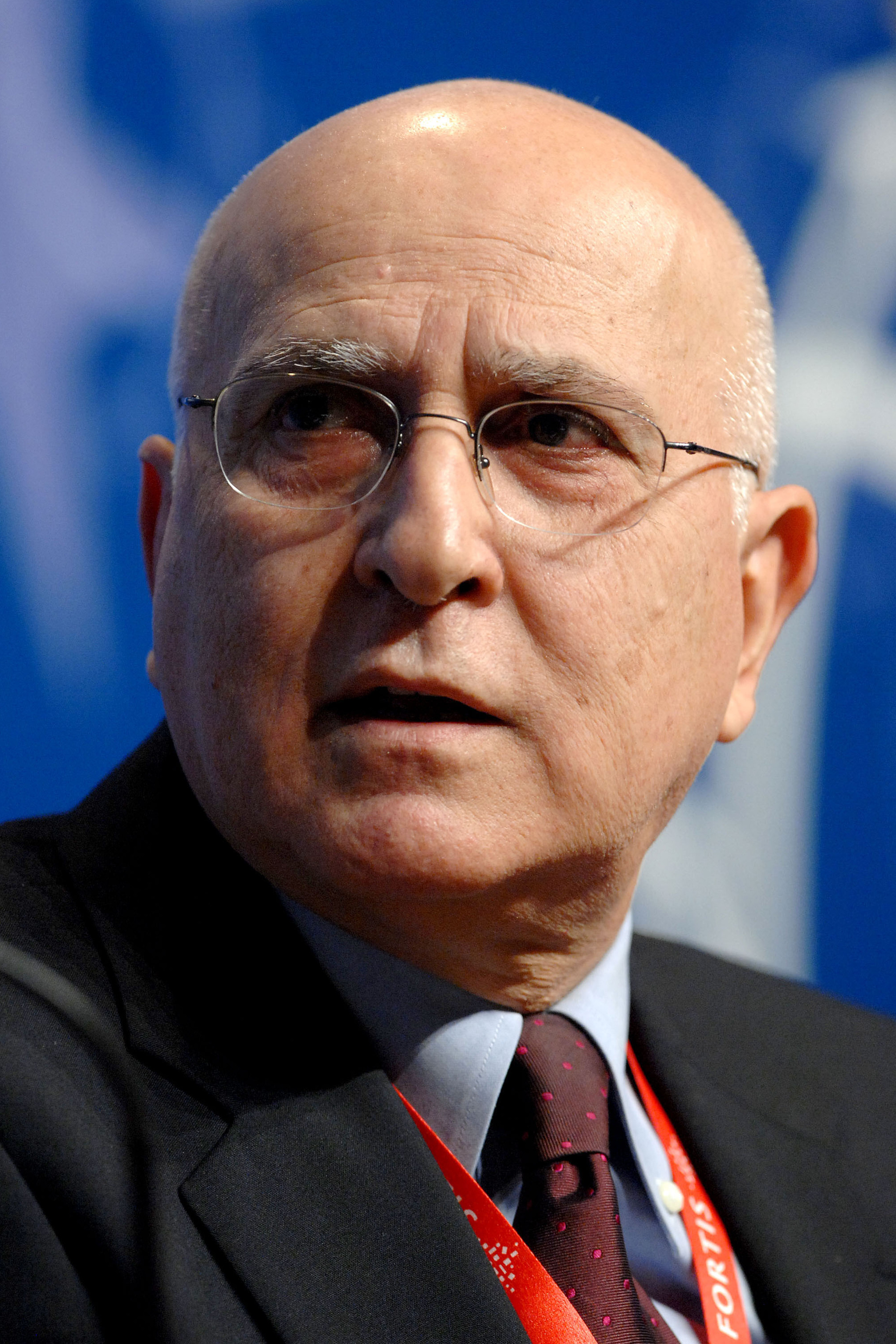
- Dimas in 2008

Minister for Foreign Affairs
- In office 11 November 2011 – 17 May 2012
- Prime Minister: Lucas Papademos
- Preceded by: Stavros Lambrinidis
- Succeeded by: Petros Molyviatis

Deputy Leader of New Democracy
- In office 2 July 2010 – 24 November 2015
- Leader: Antonis Samaras Vangelis Meimarakis
- Preceded by: Position established

European Commissioner for the Environment
- In office 22 November 2004 – 9 February 2010
- President: José Manuel Barroso
- Preceded by: Margot Wallström
- Succeeded by: Janez Potočnik

European Commissioner for Employment and Social Affairs
- In office 18 February 2004 – 22 November 2004
- President: Romano Prodi
- Preceded by: Anna Diamantopoulou
- Succeeded by: Vladimír Špidla (Employment, Social Affairs and Equal Opportunities)

Personal details
- Born: 30 April 1941 (age 85) Klenia, Greece
- Party: New Democracy
- Children: 3, including Christos
- Education: University of Athens; New York University

Stavros Dimas (Greek: Σταύρος Δήμας, Greek pronunciation: [ˈstavros ˈðimas]; born 30 April 1941) is a Greek politician who was European Commissioner for the Environment from 2004 to 2009. From November 2011 to May 2012, he served in the government of Greece as Minister for Foreign Affairs. The New Democracy–PASOK coalition government nominated him for the post of President of Greece in December 2014, but he failed to achieve the necessary votes, forcing the dissolution of parliament.

== Early life and education ==
Stavros Dimas was born in 1941 in the village of Klenia, Corinthia. Dimas studied law at the University of Athens and went on to earn a Master of Laws from New York University.

== Career ==
In 1968 he began working as a lawyer for a firm on Wall Street, moving to the World Bank the following year, where he worked on investments in Africa and the Middle East. In 1975 he returned to Greece to take up the post of deputy governor of the Hellenic Industrial Development Bank (ETVA), while also being a member of the committee preparing Greek accession to the EEC.

=== Entry into politics ===
From 1977 he was active in Greek politics as a member of the conservative New Democracy party, being elected as an MP on the nationwide list. He was elected to the Greek parliament ten consecutive times that year.

He went on to hold a variety of ministerial and other political positions:

- Deputy Minister of Economic Coordination (28 November 1977 – 10 May 1980)
- Minister of Trade (10 May – 11 October 1980)
- Minister without Portfolio (11 October 1980 – 21 October 1981)
- Parliamentary spokesperson for the New Democracy party (October 1985 – June 1989)
- Minister of Agriculture (2 July – 12 October 1989)
- Minister of Agriculture (23 November 1989 – 13 February 1990)
- Minister of Industry, Energy and Technology (11 April 1990 – 29 July 1991)
- Secretary-General of New Democracy (1995–2000)
- Senior Member of the Political Analysis Steering Committee of New Democracy (2000–2003)
- Head of the New Democracy delegation to the Council of Europe (2000–2004)

=== European Commission ===
Dimas served briefly in the Prodi Commission. He was appointed European Commissioner for Employment and Social Affairs in March 2004, taking over the role from the previous Greek Commissioner Anna Diamantopoulou. A major focus of his work during this time involved making it more difficult for states to opt out of the Working Time Directive. The Greek government nominated Dimas for the incoming Barroso Commission which took office on 22 November 2004.

In a speech to a committee of the European Parliament Dimas announced four main priorities for his term in office: climate change, biodiversity, public health, and sustainability. He emphasised the importance of the Kyoto Protocol, the Natura 2000 project, the REACH directive, and the need to better enforce existing EU environmental legislation.

==== Selection hearing ====
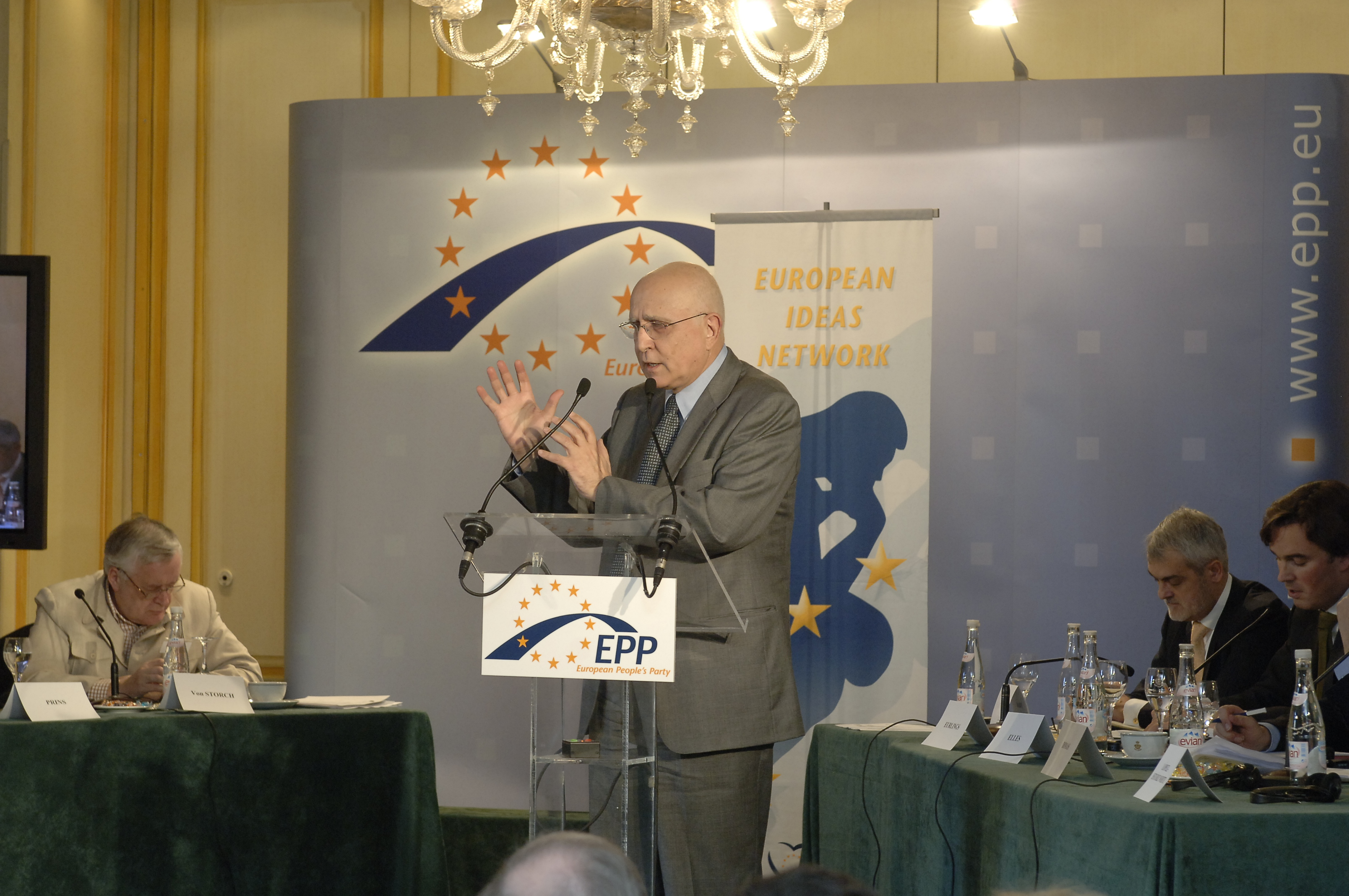
EPP convention on climate change in Madrid between 6–7 February 2008

Concerns were raised in advance by MEPs and many NGOs that by appointing a former Wall Street lawyer and industry minister to the environment post the EU had signalled a decreased commitment to environmental issues in favour of promoting economic competitiveness. However, after some months time, the environment unions quickly endorsed his programme and publicly congratulated him for being able to support the positions of the environmental organizations with great success within the commission. Dimas' role was vital especially since the President, Mr Barroso, was ready to disregard the effects on the environment due to the need to improve economic development.

Questioned by the European Parliament, Dimas took the view that preserving the environment and promoting competitiveness went hand in hand, and that environmental policy could provide a stimulus for technological innovation. Among other statements, he said that GM residues in seeds should be the lowest technically feasible.

Following his hearing Dimas received a sceptical response from most MEPs. Many believed him to have insufficient experience to fulfill the role. Karl-Heinz Florenz, chair of the Environment Committee and a member of the conservative EPP-ED, said that European environment policy needed, "more than just declarations of intention.... If Commission President-designate Barroso puts the Lisbon Strategy on top of the agenda, this must not mean that the primacy of economic over environment policy gets cemented." However, he stressed the need to give Dimas time to 'grow into' his role. The Socialists gave him a qualified approval but criticised his plans as too vague. The Greens and the left-wing GUE/NGL opposed his appointment outright, with the Greens naming him as one of the three "incompetent" Commissioners-designate who prompted them to vote against the commission as a whole. Representatives of industry and the business community welcomed his appointment to the environment post.

In a dramatic change of stance, the Greens endorsed the programme plan by Commissioner Dimas and have argued that their cooperation in environmental issues is harmonic.

==== Stance on climate change ====
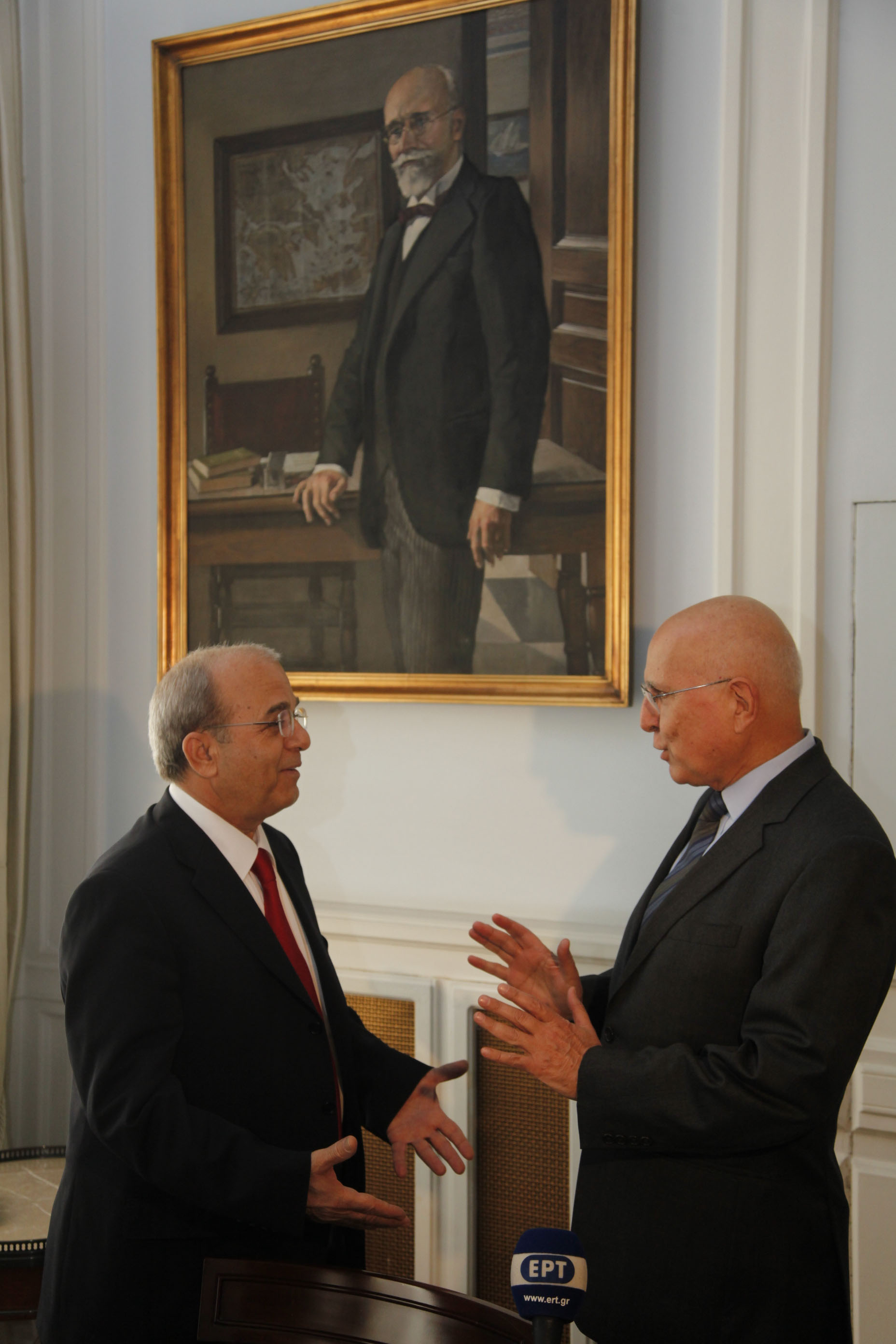
Foreign Minister of Greece Stavros Dimas (right) meeting with the Ambassador of Cyprus, Joseph Joseph, in 2011

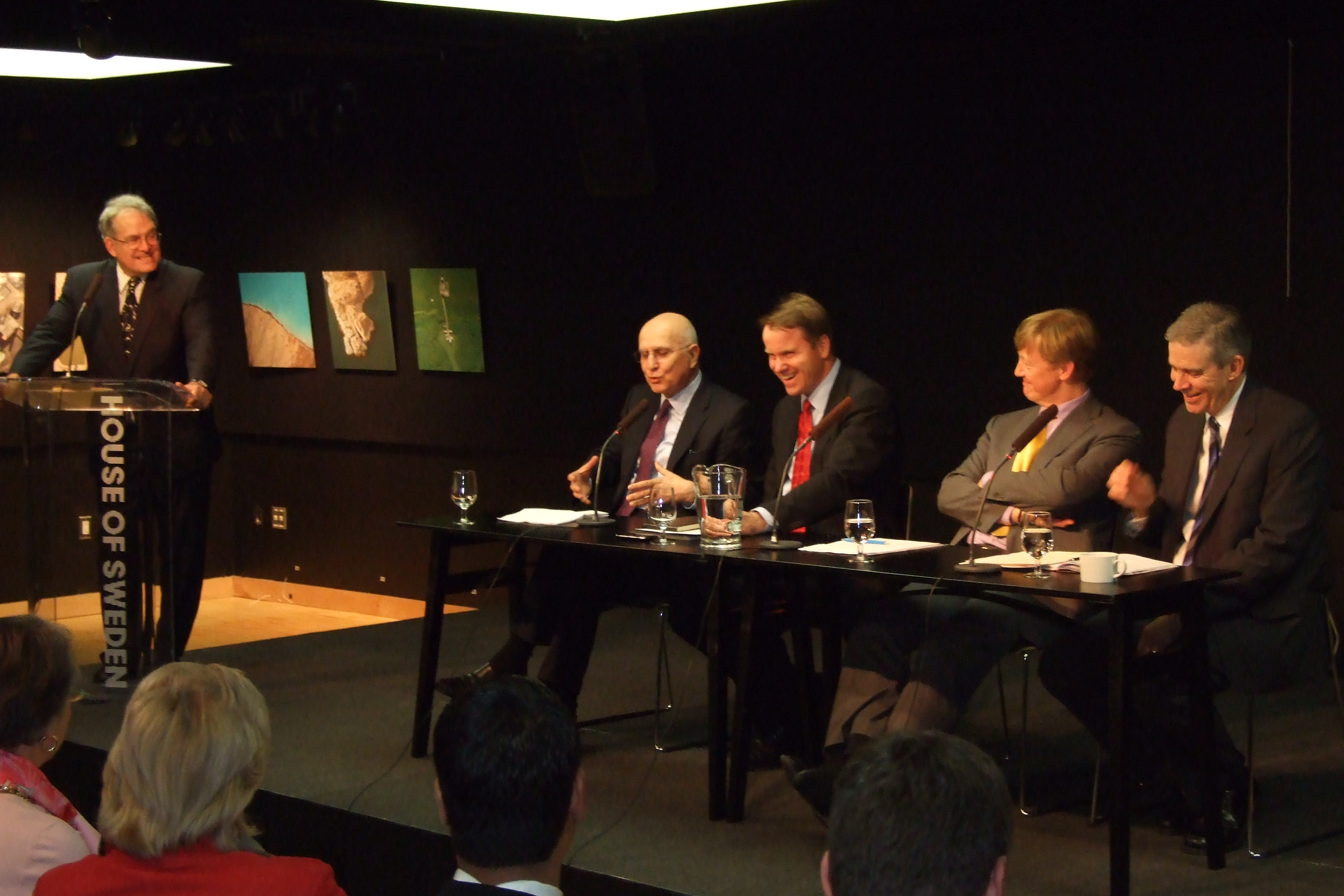
Stavros Dimas discussing with Martin Bursik and Andreas Carlgrenin the House of Sweden in September 2011

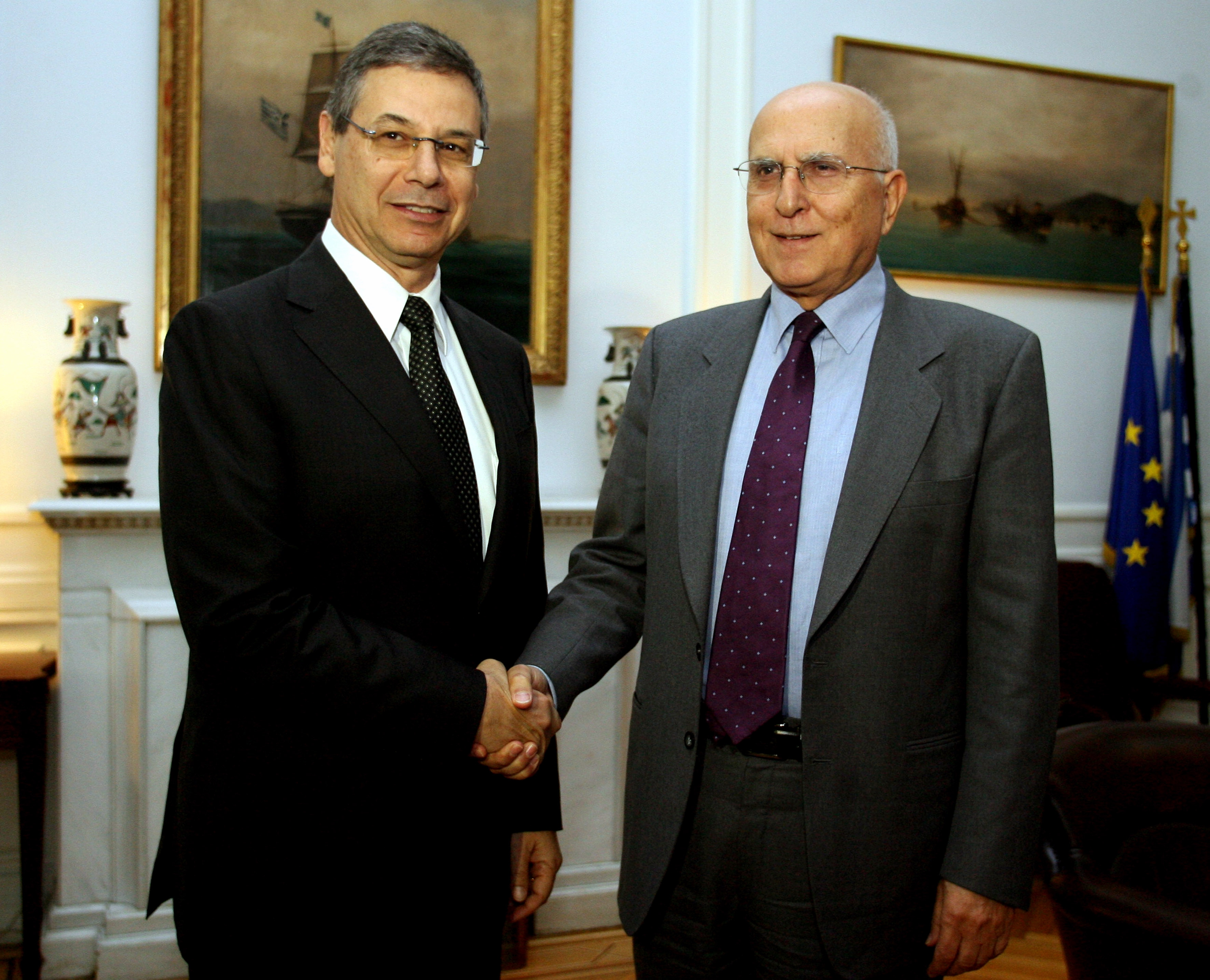
Deputy Foreign Minister of Israel Daniel Ayalon with Foreign Minister Stavros Dimas of Greece in November 2011

Dimas led the EU in its tough line on climate change during the first weeks of the new Commission. At UN talks on climate change in Buenos Aires in December 2004 he attempted to negotiate a new system of mandatory emissions reductions to follow the expiration of the initial Kyoto targets in 2012. This approach met with fierce opposition from the U.S., representatives of which refused to even discuss the matter. The Italian environment minister Altero Matteoli broke EU ranks on the issue, proposing voluntary targets after 2012, and saying that it was, "unthinkable to go ahead without the US, China and India."

In response to the refusal of countries to sign Kyoto, such as the United States and Australia (the latter of which exchanged viewpoints with the EU on the matter), the EU has been looking to tax products imported from those countries not taking low-carbon policies on board (Border Tax Adjustments).

When defending the commission's new proposals to climate change in 2007, he claimed "It is clear that the fight against climate change is much more than a battle. It is a world war that will last for many years."

Dimas oversaw the introduction of the EU's emissions trading scheme, that took effect on 1 January 2005, despite emissions reduction plans from Poland, Italy, the Czech Republic and Greece not having been approved on time. He also sought to include companies operating aircraft under the emissions trading regime.

In February 2007 the Commissioner put forward his plans to increase fuel efficiency standards of cars so that emissions are no more than 130g of CO_{2} per km, down from 162g/km in 2005. This caused anger from the European car industry which was stoked by the Commissioner requesting a Japanese car, a Toyota Prius, instead of a European make due to the Toyota's better environmental standards.

=== Return to Greece ===
In July 2010 the president of New Democracy Antonis Samaras appointed Stavros Dimas as vice-president of the party with responsibility for economic and social affairs. From 11 November 2011 to 17 May 2012 he served as Minister for Foreign Affairs in the Lucas Papademos interim cabinet.

On 9 December 2014, Prime Minister Samaras announced the candidacy of Dimas, jointly supported by New Democracy and PASOK, for the Presidency of Greece, which took place in three ballots on 17, 23 and 29 December. He failed to achieve the necessary votes, forcing the dissolution of parliament.

Political offices
Preceded by Georgios Panagiotopoulos	Minister of Trade; 1980	Succeeded by Aristides Kalantzakis
Preceded by Ioannis Pottakis	Minister of Agriculture; 1989	Succeeded by Ioannis Liapis
Preceded by Ioannis Liapis	Minister of Agriculture; 1989–1990	Succeeded by Ioannis Liapis
Preceded by Pavlos Sakellarides	Minister for Industry, Energy and Technology; 1990–1991	Succeeded by Andreas Andrianopoulos
Preceded by Anna Diamantopoulou	Greek European Commissioner; 2004–2010	Succeeded by Maria Damanaki
Preceded by Anna Diamantopoulou	European Commissioner for Employment and Social Affairs; 2004	Succeeded by Vladimír Špidla as European Commissioner for Employment, Social Affairs and Equal Opportunities
Preceded by Margot Wallström	European Commissioner for the Environment; 2004–2010	Succeeded by Janez Potočnik
Preceded by Stavros Lambrinidis	Minister of Foreign Affairs; 2011–2012	Succeeded by Petros Molyviatis
