= Pretto =

Pretto is a surname. Notable people with the surname include:

- Adão Pretto (1945–2009), Brazilian politician
- Alby Sabrina Pretto (born 1985), Italian ballet dancer
- Mario Pretto (1915–1984), Italian footballer and manager
- Olinto De Pretto (1857–1921), Italian industrialist and geologist
- Rino Pretto (born 1959), Australian rules footballer
- Satcha Pretto (born 1980), Honduran journalist
