= Harrison School for the Arts =

Lois Cowles Harrison Center for the Visual and Performing Arts

Location
- 750 Hollingsworth Road; Lakeland, Florida; U.S. 28.035812°N 81.940726°W

Information
- Type: Magnet high school
- Motto: "Fostering creativity that lasts a lifetime."
- Established: 1989
- Principal: Gian Carlo Monacelli
- Grades: 9-12
- Enrollment: 604
- Student Union/Association: Harrison Arts Council
- Website: www.harrisonarts.com

The Lois Cowles Harrison Center for the Visual and Performing Arts, also called the Harrison School for the Arts, is a high school in Lakeland, Florida, United States. The school was founded in 1989 and named after community member and art patron Lois Cowles Harrison. It is a magnet school that draws its student population from communities throughout Polk County. Students may specialize in dance, classical guitar, orchestra, piano, choir, jazz, theatre, technical theatre, musical theatre, film, visual arts, or creative writing. Students take general education classes at Lakeland High School, which is adjacent to Harrison. The school received an expansion in 2008, with renovations and the addition of 95,000 square feet to the building.

== History ==
Harrison School for the Arts opened in 1989, after much debate about whether to open Polk County's first arts school. The school started off with only 154 students, and 5 departments: Chorus, Orchestra, Dance, Musical Theater, and Art. Students in Chorus and Orchestra had to be bused everyday to nearby Florida Southern College to receive their classes. Through years of expansion, the current departments were added, now resulting in 12 total departments. Before the major renovations of 2008, Harrison shared with Lakeland High School the only chorus room and orchestra room available. The only building Harrison could call its own was the current 649-seat theater. After 2008, Harrison was able to expand into two multi-million dollar buildings. The new Harrison Arts Center is now home to a brand new 130-seat movie theater, a blackbox theater, recording studios, three art labs, three dance studios, a Musical Theatre/Vocal room, chorus room, orchestra room, jazz band room and other technologically advanced classrooms. Lakeland's fine arts sector now has their own building as well. Tom McDonald was the founding principal.

== Departments and education ==
Harrison is the house for students to take their Arts classes, while general education classes are taken at Lakeland High School. The school day is divided into 7 periods. Underclassmen take five general education periods in Lakeland High School, while their two arts classes are taken in Harrison. Upperclassmen resort to four general education classes, and three arts classes in Harrison. There are 12 departments in Harrison: Dance, Motion Picture Arts, Choral, Guitar, Piano, Jazz Band, Orchestra, Musical Theater, Theater, Theater Tech, Visual Arts, and Creative Writing. Students take their department class plus one more (two if upperclassmen) other class that will enhance their knowledge in the area. All departments require an audition to be accepted. While students that attend Harrison, are dignified as "Harrison" students, they can also take part of extra-curricular activities offered in Lakeland High School such as: Sports, Clubs, Leadership, FCA, and others.

Dance
One of the original departments, this is dedicated to students' learning in Contemporary Dance and Ballet. Areas such as Jazz Dance, Hip Hop and Modern Dance are also explored. Students also take classes in dance history, functional anatomy, and improvisation. The department hosts two concerts and two senior choreographed concerts.

Motion Picture Arts
Added in the 2008 expansion, MPA is dedicated to enhancing students' knowledge in film writing, film screening, directing, and editing. Screenwriting in three levels, Digital Editing in four levels, and Cinematography are the classes taken by students who are accepted in MPA.

Choral
Choral was one of the original departments, starting off with 21 students. Chorus is dedicated into improving vocal technique, chorus music, music history, theory, and music appreciation. Students can also take an AP Theory course, or a World Choir class which enhances in music from different regions of the world. There are currently three choirs: Women's for girls in grades 9–12, Men's for boys in grades 9–12, Chamber for boys in grades 9-12 and any girl that wants to audition, and Harrison Singers, an all-combined choir.

Guitar
Added in the 2008 expansion, Guitar is dedicated to helping the basic and advanced knowledge in Guitar playing, improvisation, theory, and technique. Students in Guitar are also eligible for the AP theory course, which involves a rigorous curriculum in theory, sight reading, and composition.

Piano
Piano enhances knowledge in basic and advanced skills in piano playing as well as music history, theory, classical and modern piano music, and improvisation. Piano hosts two concerts per year, exploring in all types of repertoire including classical, jazz, and blues music.

Jazz Band
Jazz Band explores jazz history, different types of jazz, theory, and instrument technique. Jazz Band also participates in various concerts hosted by other departments.

Orchestra
Orchestra strives for its students to master the skill of symphonic sound through instrument tech, music appreciation, and theory. Harrison's Symphonic Orchestra is well known around the nation.

Musical Theater
Musical theater focuses in the development of acting, singing, and dancing. Students take classes in Tap, Ballet, Hip Hop, Swing, and Fusion for Dance and practice different techniques for Vocal. Acting is categorized by theater history and acting technique.

Theater

Harrison's theater department is another original, going back to the day of Harrison's inception. The theater department is categorized by theater performance, with emphasis on acting technique, improvisation, creative writing, and directing. Students also engage in dramatic theory, theater history, and stagecraft.

Theater Tech
Theater Tech is in charge of every aspect of the show without performing in it. Students take control of the theater sound system for concerts, lights, stage props, stagecraft, and other aspects that are needed to run the show. Students also take part of a semester in acting. Students in theater tech are fully in charge on how shows will go.

Visual Arts
Harrison's renowned Visual Arts department is categorized by all forms of art: Painting, Sculpting, Photography, and Drawing. Students also take part of 2-D and 3-D animations using the 3-D art lab in Harrison. Harrison as well has their own gallery of all projects done so forth by the Visual Arts department and examples are also shown in the nearby Polk Museum of Art. Students are constantly recognized around the nation for their creations and many can be seen in places such as the Smithsonian in Washington D.C, Museum of Miami, and others.

Creative Writing
Added in 2014, this department includes Fiction, Non-Fiction, Scripting, Screenwriting and Poetry. Principal Ward himself was a Creative Writing student at his alma mater, Florida State University, and thought that a Creative Writing Department was needed.

== Notable alumni ==
- Charleene Closshey (Orchestra Department, 1999 Valedictorian), actor, musician, composer, and producer
- Quentin Earl Darrington, actor
- Chase Johnsey, ballet dancer, artistic director of Ballet de Barcelona
- Aaron Marsh (Orchestra Department, Class of 1999), singer/songwriter; lead singer, Copeland
- Lauren Miller, actor and screenwriter
- Elliott Morgan (Theatre Department, Class of 2005), actor, writer, host, producer and YouTube personality.
- Karen Olivo, stage and television actor
- Susan Sherouse (Orchestra Department, Class of 2001), violinist
