= Ministry of Foreign Affairs (Greece) =

Government ministry of Greece

- Υπουργείο Εξωτερικών

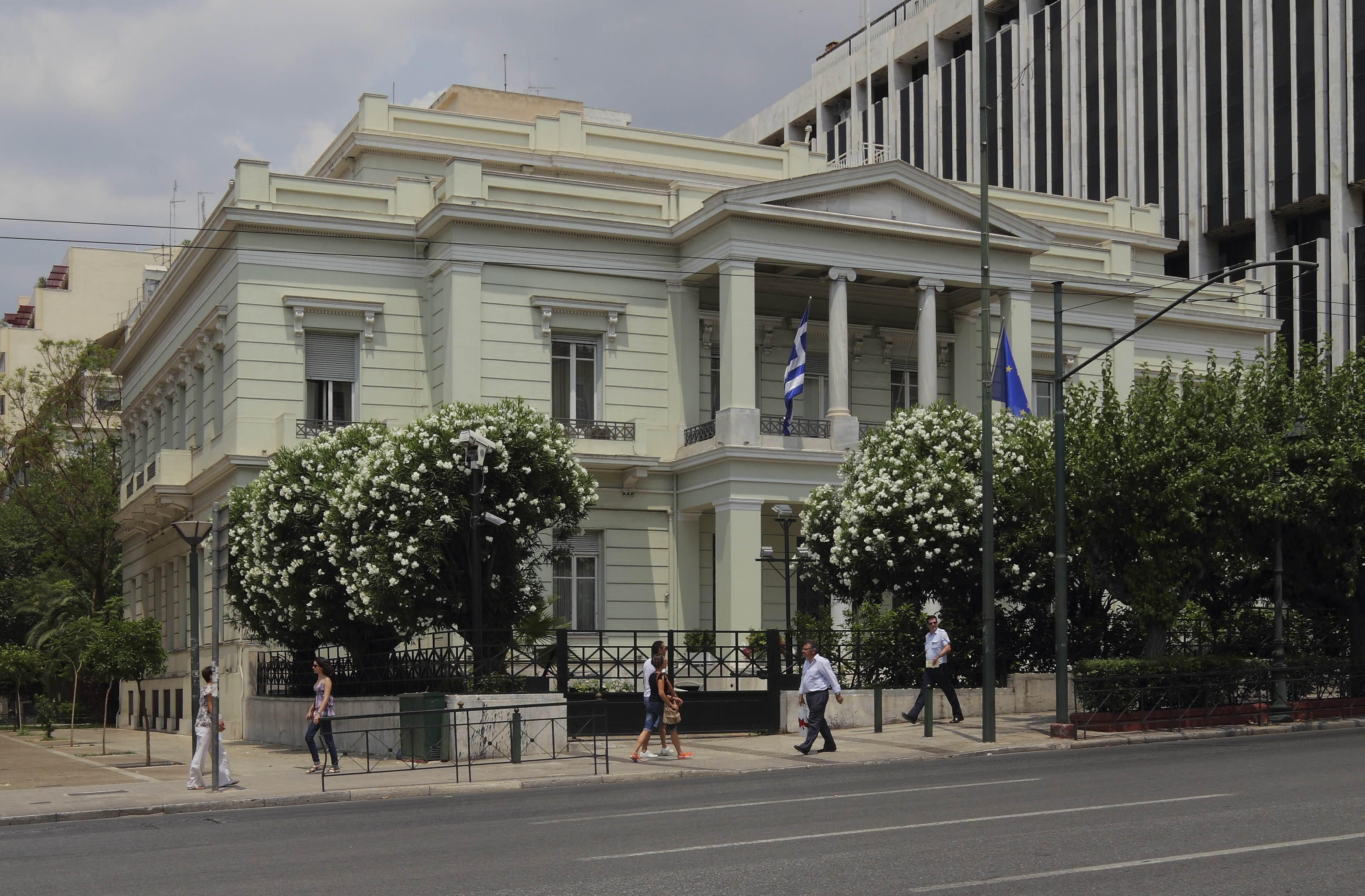
- Syggrou Mansion -Ministry of Foreign Affairs' headquarters

Agency overview
- Preceding agency: Ministry of the Royal House and Foreign Affairs (up to 1863)
- Jurisdiction: Government of Greece
- Headquarters: Syggrou Mansion, Vasilissis Sofias Avenue 5 - Athens; 37°58′35″N 23°44′15″E
- Employees: 1.847 (2024); 1.860 (2016)
- Annual budget: 420.237.000 euro (2025)
- Minister responsible: Giorgos Gerapetritis
- Deputy minister responsible: Alexandra Papadopoulou Deputy Minister with enhanced responsibilities; Tasos Hatzivasileiou, for Greek diaspora; Giannis Loverdos, for economic diplomacy and extroversion
- Agency executive: Teresa – Paraskevi Angelatou, Secretary General
- Child agencies: Secretary General for International Economic Affairs; Secretary General for Greeks Abroad and Public Diplomacy
- Website: www.mfa.gr

The Hellenic Ministry of Foreign Affairs (Greek: Υπουργείο Εξωτερικών, romanized: Ypourgeío Exōterikṓn) is a government department of Greece, headed by the Minister for Foreign Affairs. The ministry has its headquarters in Athens.

The incumbent minister is Giorgos Gerapetritis in the Second Cabinet of Kyriakos Mitsotakis.

== History ==
The Ministry of Foreign Affairs is one of Greece’s oldest ministries. Theodoros Negris is regarded as its first minister, serving from 1822 to 1823.
However, the ministry was dissolved in May 1823, as Greece had not yet gained official recognition from any state. It was re-established in 1827 as an independent entity under the name Secretariat of State for Foreign Affairs and Merchant Marine. In 1828, Greece was formally recognized as a state by the three protecting powers, leading to the appointment of the first ambassadors to the country. This title persisted until April 1833, when, following the arrival of King Otto, it was renamed the Secretariat of State for the Royal House and Foreign Affairs, with Spyridon Trikoupis as its first minister.During this period, Greece expanded its diplomatic relations with Austrian Empire, Belgium, Danish Unitary State, the Kingdom of the Netherlands, the Kingdom of the Two Sicilies, and the Kingdom of Sweden and Norway. In 1846, the title was updated to the Ministry of the Royal House and Foreign Affairs. In February 1863, it adopted its current official name, the Ministry of Foreign Affairs.

== Responsibilities ==
The mission of the Ministry is to implement the country's foreign policy, and its responsibilities include, among others:

- Supporting and promoting Greek interests in foreign states and the international community
- Providing information and updates on Greek issues and positions
- Representing the Hellenic Republic and its government in international organizations and bodies
- Offering diplomatic support to state institutions, public enterprises and organizations, political parties, and members of parliament during their international contacts
- Promoting and protecting the rights and interests of Greeks abroad
- Promoting and safeguarding Greece's economic, commercial, maritime, tourism, and other interests abroad
- Managing the diplomatic correspondence of the President of the Republic
- Maintaining relations of the Hellenic Republic with the Ecumenical Patriarchate, autocephalous Orthodox churches, and other religious denominations
- Politically administering Mount Athos
- Handling matters related to the awarding of Greek Orders of Excellence and the authorization to accept foreign distinctions

== List of ministers for foreign affairs since 1974 ==
Photo	Name	Took office	Left office	Party
	Georgios Mavros	24 July 1974	9 October 1974	Centre Union
	Dimitrios Bitsios	17 October 1974	20 November 1977	New Democracy
	Panagiotis Papaligouras	29 November 1977	10 May 1978	New Democracy
	Georgios Rallis	10 May 1978	10 May 1980	New Democracy
	Konstantinos Mitsotakis	10 May 1980	21 October 1981	New Democracy
	Ioannis Charalambopoulos	21 October 1981	26 July 1985	PASOK
	Karolos Papoulias	26 July 1985	2 July 1989	PASOK
	Tzannis Tzannetakis	2 July 1989	12 October 1989	New Democracy
	Georgios Papoulias	12 October 1989	23 November 1989	Independent
	Antonis Samaras	23 November 1989	16 February 1990	New Democracy
	Georgios Papoulias	16 February 1990	11 April 1990	Independent
	Antonis Samaras	11 April 1990	14 April 1992	New Democracy
	Konstantinos Mitsotakis	14 April 1992	7 August 1992	New Democracy
	Michalis Papakonstantinou	7 August 1992	13 October 1993	New Democracy
	Karolos Papoulias	13 October 1993	22 January 1996	PASOK
	Theodoros Pangalos	22 January 1996	18 February 1999	PASOK
	George Papandreou	18 February 1999	13 February 2004	PASOK
	Tasos Giannitsis	13 February 2004	10 March 2004	PASOK
	Petros Molyviatis	10 March 2004	15 February 2006	New Democracy
	Dora Bakoyannis	15 February 2006	7 October 2009	New Democracy
	George Papandreou	7 October 2009	7 September 2010	PASOK
	Dimitris Droutsas	7 September 2010	17 June 2011	PASOK
	Stavros Lambrinidis	17 June 2011	11 November 2011	PASOK
	Stavros Dimas	11 November 2011	17 May 2012	New Democracy
	Petros Molyviatis	17 May 2012	21 June 2012	New Democracy
	Dimitris Avramopoulos	21 June 2012	25 June 2013	New Democracy
	Evangelos Venizelos	25 June 2013	27 January 2015	PASOK
	Nikos Kotzias	27 January 2015	27 August 2015	Syriza
	Petros Molyviatis	28 August 2015	21 September 2015	New Democracy
	Nikos Kotzias	23 September 2015	20 October 2018	Syriza
	Alexis Tsipras (also PM)	20 October 2018	15 February 2019	Syriza
	Georgios Katrougalos	15 February 2019	9 July 2019	Syriza
	Nikos Dendias	9 July 2019	25 May 2023	New Democracy
	Vasilis Kaskarelis	25 May 2023	27 June 2023	Independent
	Giorgos Gerapetritis	27 June 2023	present	New Democracy

== See also ==
- List of foreign ministers of Greece
