= Les Ballets Trockadero de Monte Carlo =

American comedy drag ballet company

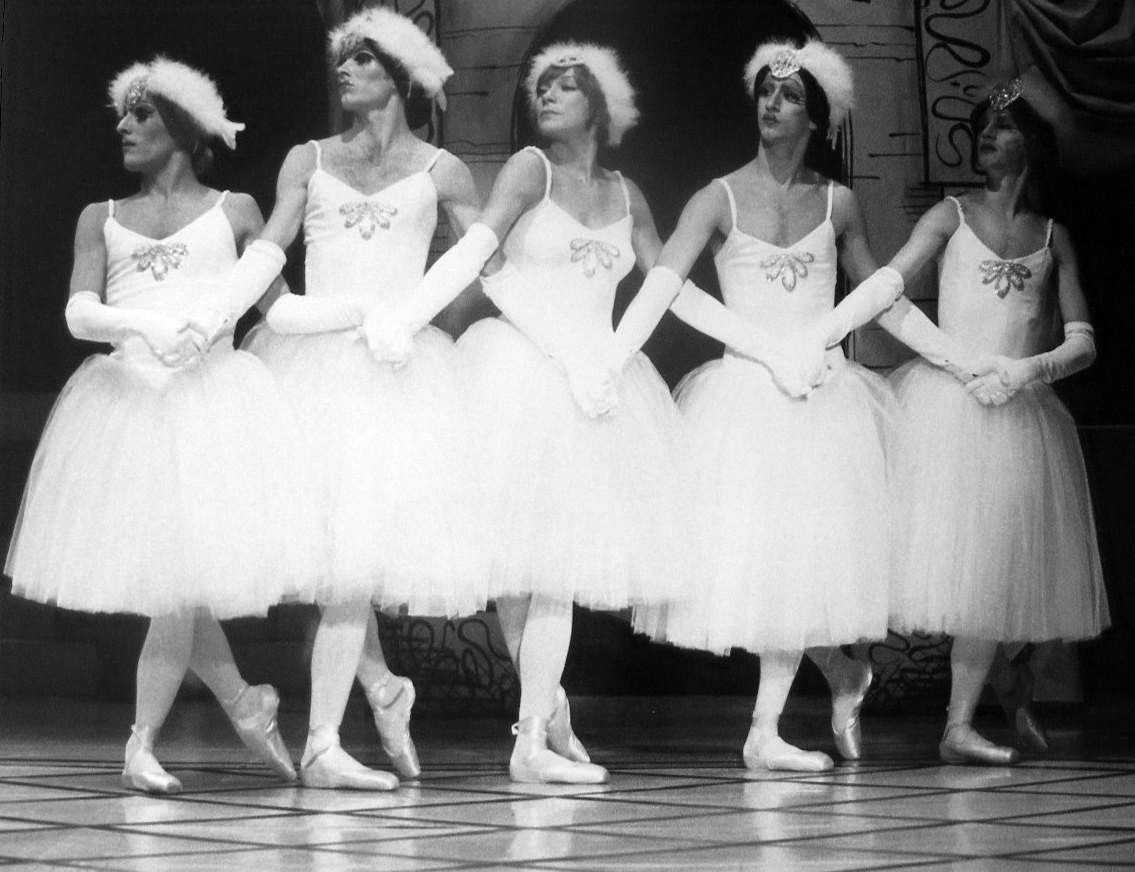
The troupe performs with Shirley MacLaine (center) on her 1977 television special "Where Do We Go From Here?"

Les Ballets Trockadero de Monte Carlo is an all-male drag ballet troupe that parodies the conventions of romantic and classical ballet. The company's current artistic director is Tory Dobrin.

The dancers portray both male and female roles in a humorous style that combines parodies of ballet, posing, and physical comedy with "straighter" pieces intended to show off the performers' technical skills. Much of the humor is the male dancers performing en travesti in roles usually reserved for females, while wearing tutus and dancing en pointe.

== History ==
Prior to the founding of Les Ballets Trockadero de Monte Carlo, members of Charles Ludlam's Ridiculous Theatre Company formed a company called the Trockadero Gloxinia Ballet Company in 1972. This company included Larry Ree, Richard Goldberger, Lohr Wilson, Roy Blakey, Peter Anastos, Natch Taylor, and Anthony Bassae. They often performed at La MaMa Experimental Theatre Club in the East Village of Manhattan.

Productions at La MaMa included Sobechenskaya Dances in 1972, multiple productions titled Ekathrina Sobechenskaya Dances with the Troxadero Gloxinia Ballet Company in 1974, and Ekathrina Sobechenskaya Dances with the Original Trockadero Gloxinia Ballet Company in 1975. They continued to perform at La MaMa in 1976 and 1977, then returned in 1982, twice in 1987, and in 1990, with Madame Ekathrina Sobechenskaya's Original Trocadero Gloxinia Ballet.

Les Ballets Trockadero de Monte Carlo was co-founded by Peter Anastos, Natch Taylor, and Anthony Bassae, all of the Trockadero Gloxinia Ballet Company, in 1974. They initially produced small, late-night shows in off-off-Broadway spaces. The troupe's first show was on September 9, 1974 in a second-story loft on 14th Street in the Meatpacking District. After receiving a favorable review in The New Yorker by Arlene Croce, the company was discovered by a wider audience. The "Trocks" toured the world, with prolonged engagements in many major cities.

In 2008, they performed at the Royal Variety Performance in front of Prince Charles. In 2017, the troupe were profiled in Bobbi Jo Hart's documentary film Rebels on Pointe.

== Dancers ==
Name	Birthplace	Joined the company	Female role	Male role
Raydel Caceres	Pinar del Río, Cuba	August 2023	Blagovesta Zlotmachinskaya	Mikhail Mudkin
Robert Carter	Charleston, South Carolina	November 1995	Olga Supphozova	Yuri Smirnov
Ugo Cirri	Lausanne, Switzerland	May 2019	Minnie Van Driver	William Vanilla
Boysie Dikobe	Brits, South Africa	February 2011	Sonia Leftova	Andrei Leftov
Matias Dominguez Escrig	Santiago, Chile	October 2023	Gerard Törd	Pavel Törd
Andrea Fabbri	Lugo, Italy	October 2023	Tatiana Youbetyabootskaya	Araf Legupski
Gabriel Foley	Overland Park, Kansas	July 2023	Resi Oachikatzlschwoaf	Ilya Bobovnikov
Kevin Garcia	Gran Canaria, Spain	August 2017	Elvira Khababgallina	Sergey Legupski
Duane Gosa	Chicago, Illinois	September 2013	Helen Highwaters	Vladimir Legupski
Carlos Hopuy	Havana, Cuba	February 2012	Alla Snizova	Innokenti Smoktumuchsky
Jack Furlong, Jr.	Boston, Massachusetts	September 2014	Guzella Verbitskaya	Mikhail Mudkin
Shohei Iwahama	Komae-shi, Tokyo, Japan	March 2022	Anya Marx	Chip Pididouda
Philip Martin-Nielson	Middletown, New York	September 2012	Nadia Doumiafeyva	Kravlji Snepek
Felix Molinero del Paso	Grenana, Spain	October 2021	Holly Dey-Abroad	Bruno Backpfeifengesicht
Trent Montgomery	McGehee, Arkansas	August 2021	Ludmila Beaulemova	Jens Witzelsucht
Raffaele Morra	Fossano, Italy	May 2001	Lariska Dumbchenko	Pepe Dufka
Sergio Najera	Mexico City, Mexico	February 2023	Bertha Vinayshinsky	Irving Verschemelt
Christopher Ouellette	San Francisco, California	May 2014	Colette Adae	Marat Legupski
Giovanni Ravelo	Bucaramanga, Colombia	October 2008	Irina Kolesterolikova	Boris Mudko
Alejandro Gonzalez Rodriguez	Holguín, Cuba	May 2019	Maria Clubfoot	Tino Xirau-Lopez
Salvador Sasot Sellart	Lleida, Spain	August 2019	Grunya Protazova	Marat Legupski
Jake Speakman	Philadelphia, Pennsylvania	November 2021	Colette Adae	Timur Legupski
Joshua Thake	Providence, Rhode Island	November 2011	Eugenia Repelskii	Jacques d’Aniels
Roberto Vega	Manatí, Puerto Rico	August 2017	Ludmila Beaulemova	Mikhail Mypansarov
Haojun Xie	Xi'an, China	August 2018	Maya Thickenthighya	Nicholas Khachafallenjar
Takaomi Yoshino	Osaka, Japan	August 2018	Varvara Laptopova	Boris Dumbkopf
Long Zou	Liling, China	May 2009; rejoined January 2016	Nina Enimenimynimova	Ketevan Iosifidi

=== Notable former dancers ===
- Chase Johnsey
- Brock Hayhoe
- Sabrina Pretto

== Repertoire ==
From the classical repertoire

- Swan Lake Act II (choreography by Lev Ivanov, music by Pyotr Ilyich Tchaikovsky)
- The Black Swan (Black Swan Pas de Deux from Swan Lake) (choreography after Marius Petipa, music by Tchaikovsky and revised by Riccardo Drigo)
- Don Quixote Act I (choreography after Petipa and Alexander Gorsky, music by Ludwig Minkus)
- Don Quixote Grand Pas de Deux (choreography after Petipa and Gorsky, music by Minkus)
- Le Corsaire Pas de Deux (choreography after Petipa, music by Drigo, Gerber, and Boris Fitinhof-Schell)
- Grand Pas de Trois des Odalisques from Le Corsaire (choreography by Petipa, music by Adolphe Adam and Cesare Pugni)
- Grand Pas de Deux from Act III of The Sleeping Beauty (choreography by Petipa, music by Tchaikovsky)
- The Bluebird from Act III of The Sleeping Beauty (choreography by Petipa, music by Tchaikovsky)
- Pas de Trois from The Fairy Doll (choreography after Sergei Legat and Nikolai Legat, music by Drigo)
- The Little Humpbacked Horse (Grand Ballabile from the Under-water Scene) (choreography by Petipa and Gorsky after Arthur Saint-Léon, music by Pugni)
- Diane and Actéon Pas de Deux (choreography by Agrippina Vaganova, music by Pugni and adapted by Drigo)
- The Nutcracker (choreography by Pamela Pribisco, music by Tchaikovsky)
- Pas de Quatre (choreography by Anton Dolin after Doin Trutti Gasparinetti, music by Pugni and orchestrated by Leighton Lucas)
- Raymonda's Wedding (Act III of Raymonda (choreography by Konstantin Sergeyev after Petipa, music by Alexander Glazunov)
- Les Sylphides (choreography by Mikhail Fokine, music by Frederic Chopin)
- Flower Festival at Genzano Pas de Deux (choreography by August Bournonville, music by Holger Simon Paulli)
- Grand Pas Classique from Le Dieu et la Bayadère (choreography by Victor Gsovsky, music by Daniel Auber)

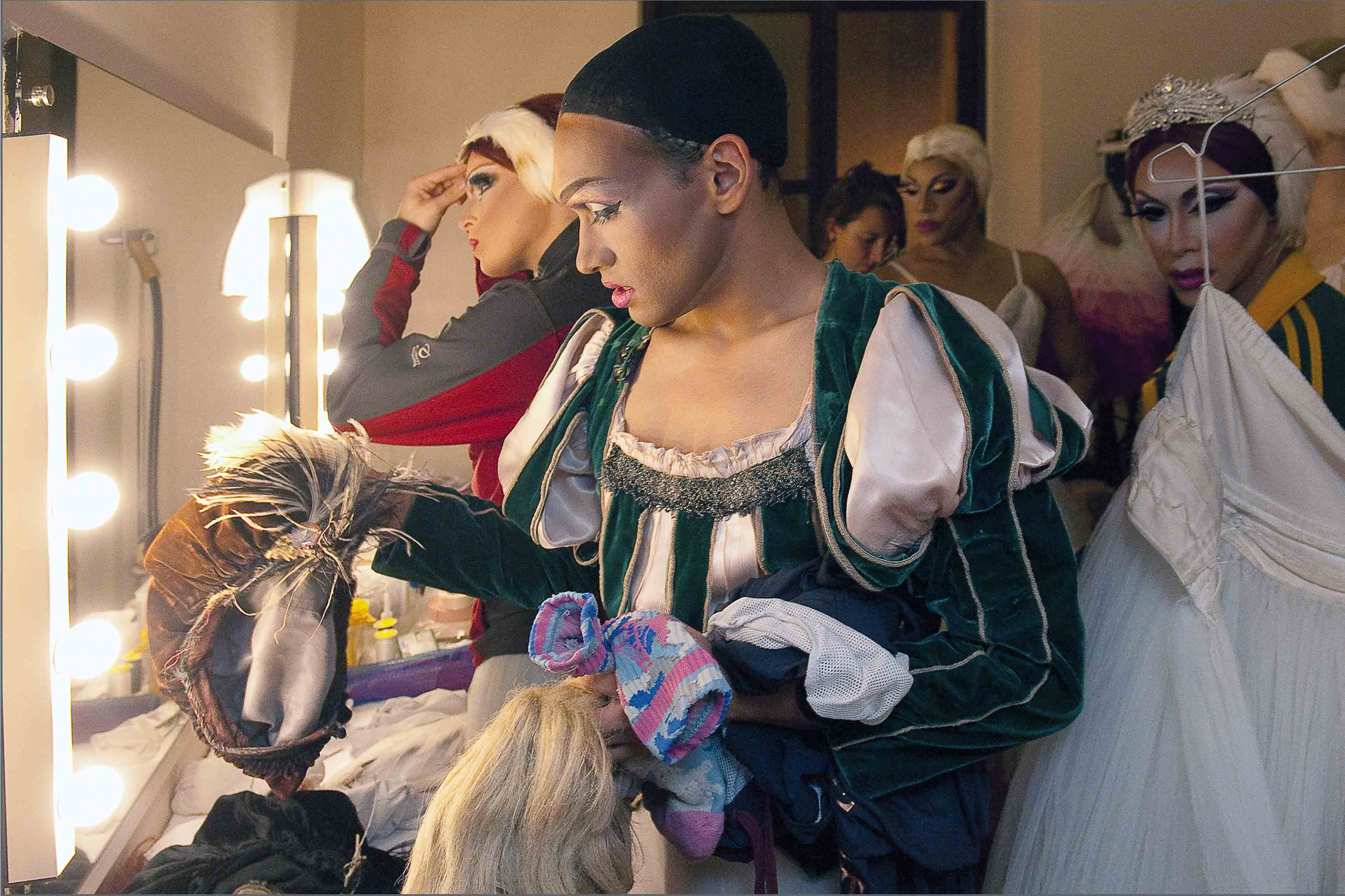
In the dressing room of the Coccia theatre, in Novara (Italy)

Other works

- École de Ballet
- Go for Barocco (parody of George Balanchine's choreography)
- Cross Currents (for 3 dancers)
- The Dance of Liberation
- Gaîté Parisienne
- The Dances of Isadora
- Vivaldi Suite
- La Trovatiara Pas de Cinq (from a lost Giueseppe Verdi opera)
- Yes Virginia, Another Piano Ballet (5 dancers in a rehearsal studio in the style of Jerome Robbins, music by Chopin)
- Stars & Stripes Forever
- Dances of Ruth St. Denis
- Spring Waters
- Debut at the Opera
- Gambol
- I Wanted to Dance With You
- Lamentation of Jane Eyre
- Patterns in Space

Solo works

- The Dying Swan (choreography by Michel Fokine after staging by Trutti Gasparinetti) Debut at the Opera; Ribbon Dance; Russian Dance

== Reviews ==
- Gus Solomons Jr. (March 1996). "Les Ballets Trockadero de Monte Carlo, Sylvia and Danny Kaye Playhouse, December 12–17". Dance Magazine. Vol. 70, no. 3. Archived from the original on June 16, 2011.
- Elizabeth Zimmer (August 20, 2002). "Trocks Transcendent: Attitude With Altitude and Horsepower to Spare". The Village Voice. Archived from the original on October 31, 2007.
