= Tory Dobrin =

Tory Dobrin is the artistic director of the American all-male Les Ballets Trockadero de Monte Carlo. He first joined the Trocks (as they are widely known) in 1980 as a dancer.

== See also ==
- Dance in the United States
- List of ballet companies in the United States
