= 2014–2015 Greek presidential election =

Indirect presidential election

- 17 December 2014 – 18 February 2015

300 members of the Hellenic Parliament First round: 200 votes needed to win Final round: 180 votes needed to win
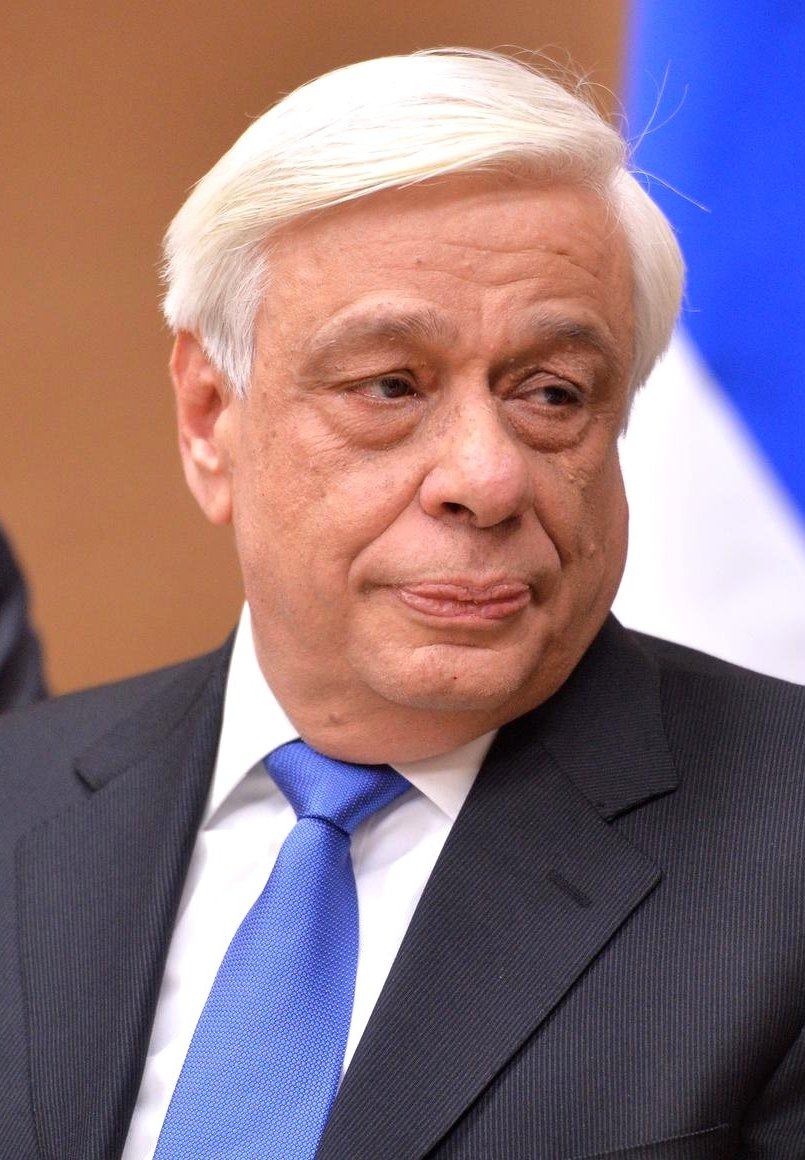

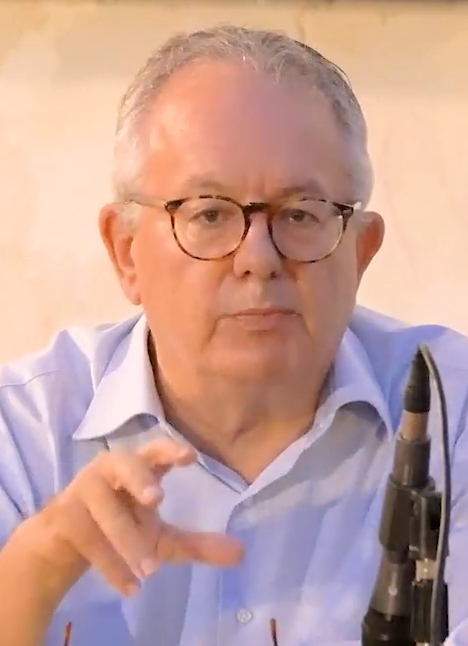

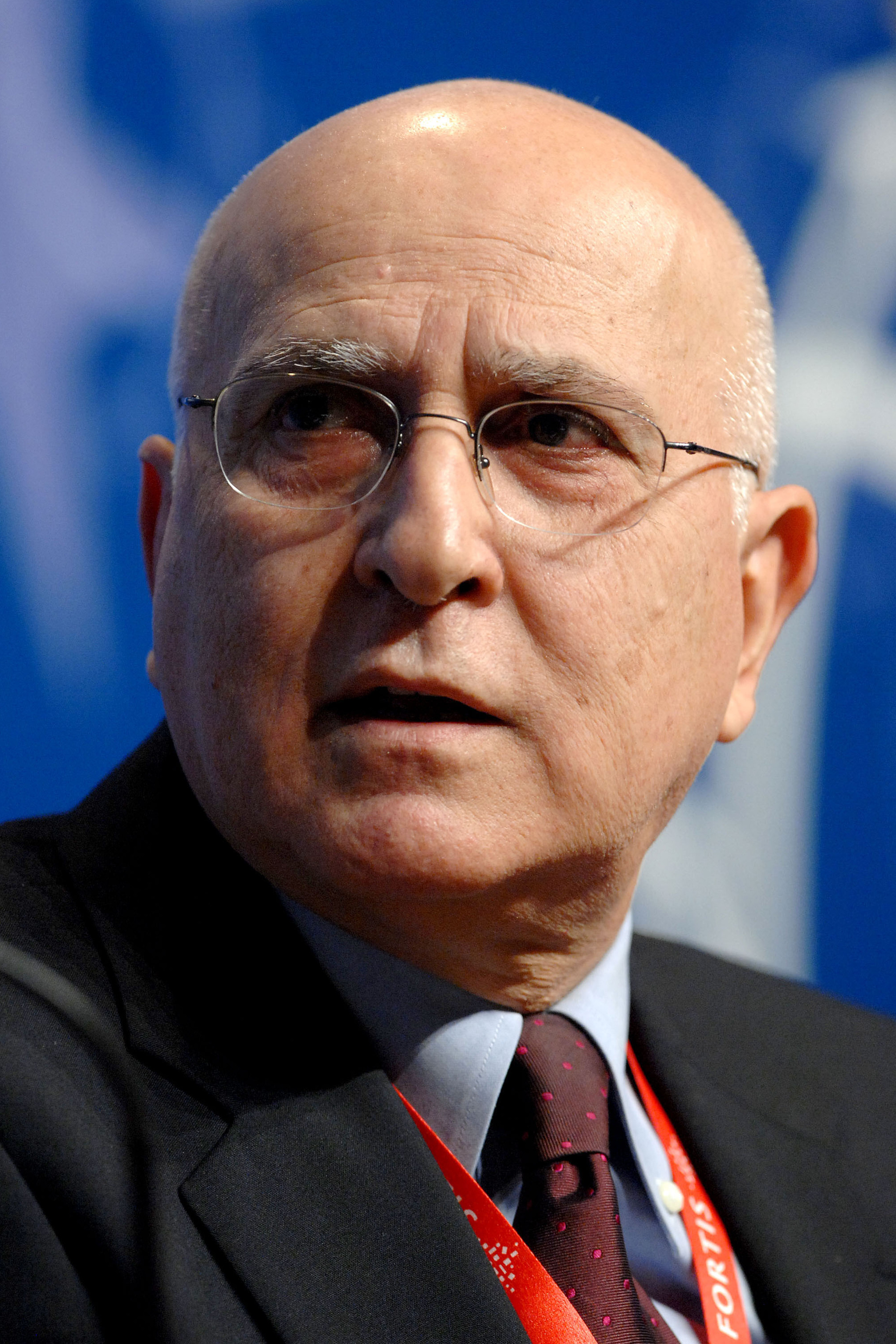

Nominee	Prokopis Pavlopoulos	Nikos Alivizatos
Party	ND	Independent
Alliance	Syriza, ND & ANEL	The River & PASOK
First round	-	-
Final round	233 (77.6%)	30 (10.0%)
Nominee	Stavros Dimas	Present/Abstents
Party	ND
Alliance	ND & PASOK
First round	160 (53.3%)	140 (46.6%)
Final round	-	37 (12.3%)
President before election
Karolos Papoulias
PASOK
President after election
Prokopis Pavlopoulos
ND

Indirect presidential elections were held in Greece in December 2014 and February 2015 for the succession to Karolos Papoulias as President of the Hellenic Republic. The candidate of the ND–PASOK government, Stavros Dimas, failed to secure the required majority of MPs of the Hellenic Parliament in the first three rounds of voting in December. According to the provisions of the Constitution of Greece, a snap election was held on 25 January 2015, which was won by the left-wing Syriza party. Following the convening of the new Parliament, the presidential election resumed. On 18 February 2015, veteran ND politician Prokopis Pavlopoulos, backed by the Syriza-ANEL coalition government, was elected with 233 votes.

== Date ==
Prime Minister Antonis Samaras and Deputy Prime Minister Evangelos Venizelos asked (9 December) the Speaker of the Parliament for the procedure of presidential elections to move as quickly as possible.

The presidential election was brought forward by a few months, and the first round was held on 17 December, the second on 23 December and the third on 29 December. On 9 December 2014, Samaras announced the candidacy of New Democracy politician Stavros Dimas, jointly supported by the ruling New Democracy–PASOK coalition, for the presidency.

== Constitutional provisions ==
According to Article 32 the Greek Constitution, the president is elected for a five-year term by the Hellenic Parliament in a special session at least a month before the incumbent's term expires. The first and second rounds require a supermajority of 200 out of the 300-strong body, dropping to 180 on the third.

In the event of a non-election even after the third ballot, the parliament is to be dissolved and a snap election to be called within ten days. After reconvening, the new parliament holds a maximum of three further rounds of voting, with the required majority at 180 votes in the fourth and a simple majority of 151 votes in the fifth round. A sixth and last round would be contested between the two candidates with the most votes and decided by a relative majority.

== Procedure ==
Distribution of seats in the Hellenic Parliament in December 2014: New Democracy: 125; Syriza: 71; PASOK: 27; Golden Dawn: 16; Indep. Democrat MPs: 16; Democratic Left: 14; ANEL: 13; Communist Party: 12; Independent: 6

=== First three rounds ===
On the first ballot, held on 17 December, Dimas received 160 votes, i.e. the 155 votes of ND and PASOK, plus five votes from independent MPs. 135 MPs voted "present" and five MPs were absent or abstained.

On the second ballot, held 23 December, Dimas received 168 votes. 131 MPs voted "present" and one MP was absent or abstained. On both ballots, 200 votes would have been necessary for election.

On the third ballot, held 29 December, Dimas again received 168 votes, still not meeting the lowered quorum of 180 votes required to be elected in the third round.

=== Dissolution of Parliament ===
After being asked by prime minister Samaras, incumbent president Papoulias on 31 December issued a presidential decree formally dissolving the parliament, as required by the constitution. The new election was set to be held on 25 January and the new parliament to reconvene on 5 February 2015.

=== Following SYRIZA's victory ===
Distribution of seats in the Hellenic Parliament in February 2015: Syriza: 149; New Democracy: 76; Golden Dawn: 17; The River: 17; Communist Party: 15; ANEL: 13; PASOK: 13

Following the electoral victory of SYRIZA in the 25 January election, the new parliament was inaugurated on 5 February, and elected its speaker and presidium the next day. According to the provisions of the Constitution, the new parliament would then immediately have to resume the presidential election. The first of the three rounds was initially expected to be held either on 7 or on 8 February, but was postponed for 13 February. The date was subsequently postponed again, due to the new government's preoccupation with negotiations with the other Eurozone members over Greece's debt, with SYRIZA's candidate for the presidency to be announced on the weekend of 14–15 February.

In the aftermath of its victory, it fell to SYRIZA to nominate the main candidate for the second round of the presidential election. According to Greek media, the most likely choice was the Greek EU Commissioner and vice chairman of New Democracy, Dimitris Avramopoulos. The nomination would have been seen both as a gesture of conciliation with the right, but would crucially also have enabled SYRIZA to nominate its own EU Commissioner. Although an unofficial rumour, the suggestion caused a few days of internal dissension within ND. In order to calm spirits within his party, on 30 January Samaras phoned Avramopoulos and assured him that ND would support his eventual candidacy. It was also revealed that SYRIZA initially approached the former chairman of ND and Prime Minister in 2004–09, Kostas Karamanlis, but that he turned the offer down. The possibility of Avramopoulos' candidacy however raised voices of protest from SYRIZA MPs as well due to his association with the "policies of the memorandum". Greek newspaper To Vima disclosed that high representatives of Syriza also considered the candidacy of the widely respected Eastern Orthodox Archbishop of Tirana, Durrës and All Albania, Anastasios. Anastasios declined stating that "an Orthodox pontiff has only one defined ecclesiastical task. He cannot take over a political position". By 11 February, the two main figures tipped for the office were Karamanlis and Avramopoulos, with government source reporting that any other candidacy would be a radical departure from current plans. In the unlikely event of such an outsider candidature, however, author Ioanna Karystiani and film director Costas Gavras were considered as likely choices, while the candidacy of former Synaspismos chairman Nikos Konstantopoulos would be unlikely since his daughter Zoi Konstantopoulou was the new Speaker of Parliament.

=== Fourth round ===
The announcement of SYRIZA's candidate was expected on Sunday 15 February, but was again postponed for 17 February and the convention of the parliamentary groups of SYRIZA and its government partner ANEL, due to vehement opposition towards Avramopoulos by SYRIZA's inner-party opposition, chiefly the Left Platform led by Panagiotis Lafazanis. The next round of voting was scheduled to be held on the next day, 18 February. On 17 February, Prime Minister Alexis Tsipras nominated veteran New Democracy politician and former Interior Minister Prokopis Pavlopoulos for the post. In reaction, The River proposed the distinguished jurist Nikos Alivizatos as its own candidate for the presidency. New Democracy was expected to support Pavlopoulos, while PASOK announced its support for Alivizatos. The Communist Party of Greece declared that regardless of the candidate, its MPs would vote "present". Given party strength in Parliament, where SYRIZA held 149 seats, ANEL 13 seats, and New Democracy 76 seats, Pavlopoulos was expected to comfortably pass the necessary majority of 180 votes.

On 18 February, Pavlopoulos was elected as the new president of the republic with 233 votes in favour, while 30 were for Alivizatos, and 32 MPs (from the Communists and Golden Dawn) voted "present". Five MPs were absent, with two ND MPs being abroad, and two SYRIZA and one ND MPs deliberately abstaining.

== Rounds overview ==
Votes	1st Round 17 December 2014	2nd Round 23 December 2014	3rd Round 29 December 2014	4th Round 18 February 2015
Stavros Dimas (ND, PASOK)	160	168	168	–
Prokopis Pavlopoulos (Syriza, ANEL, ND)	–	–	–	233
Nikos Alivizatos (The River, PASOK)	–	–	–	30
Present	135	131	132	32
Abstents	5	1	0	5
Total	300	300	300	300
Votes required	200	200	180	180

== Reactions ==
As the ruling ND–PASOK coalition did not have enough seats to ensure the election of a president of the republic, the possibility of snap elections, which could be won by the leftist anti-austerity Syriza party and its leader Alexis Tsipras, that was then leading in opinion polls, caused widespread anxiety over Greece's future, struggling to exit a prolonged government-debt crisis. On Tuesday, 30 December 2014, following the announcement of the elections being brought forward, the Athens Stock Exchange fell by 9.5% and interest rates for 10-year loans of Greece went up to 9%.

The president of the European Commission Jean-Claude Juncker all but supported the coalition candidate Stavros Dimas. In a television debate on 11 December he said: "I think that the Greeks - who have a very difficult life - know very well what a wrong election result would mean for Greece and the eurozone."

== See also ==
- Greek withdrawal from the eurozone

== Footnotes ==
a: There is precedent of an ecclesiastical head of state or government in Eastern Orthodox countries: Archbishop Makarios III served as President of Cyprus, Archbishop Damaskinos of Athens served as regent and Prime Minister of Greece, Archbishop Kliment of Tarnovo served as Prime Minister of Bulgaria, and Patriarch Miron of Romania served as regent and Prime Minister of his country.
