= Aristides Kalantzakis =

Greek politician

Aristides Kalantzakos

Minister of Labor
- In office April 11, 1990 – October 13, 1993
- Prime Minister: Konstantinos Mitsotakis
- Preceded by: Ιωάννης Κουκιάδης
- Succeeded by: Evangelos Yannopoulos

Minister for Trade
- In office October 11, 1980 – October 21, 1981
- Prime Minister: Georgios Rallis
- Preceded by: Stavros Dimas
- Succeeded by: Nikolaos Akritidis

Member of the Hellenic Parliament
- In office 1974–1996
- Constituency: Messenia

Member of the Hellenic Parliament
- In office 1958–1967
- Constituency: Messenia

Personal details
- Born: April 10, 1928 Kyparissia, Greece
- Died: February 26, 2017 (aged 88)
- Party: New Democracy

Aristides Kalantzakos (Greek: Αριστείδης Καλαντζάκος April 10, 1928 – February 26, 2017) was a Greek politician and member of the New Democracy party. Kalantzakos served in the Hellenic Parliament, representing the Messenia constituency, from 1958 to 1967 and 1974 to 1996. His portfolios as a New Democracy government minister included the now defunct Minister for Trade from 1980 to 1981 and Minister of Labor from 1990 to 1993.

Kalantzakos studied law at the University of Athens. He then continued his studies in Paris and Nancy, France. He was first elected to the Hellenic Parliament in the 1958 legislative election, representing Messenia, and won re-election in 1961, 1963, and 1964. He then briefly held the position of Deputy Finance Minister from April 4, 1967, until April 21, 1967, when a coup installed the Greek military junta of 1967–74.

In 1974, the military junta ended, allowing for the 1974 Greek legislative election in which Kalantzakos returned to Parliament. He was re-elected to the Hellenic Parliament in the 1977, 1981, 1985, June 1989, November 1989, 1990 and 1993 legislative elections. Kalantzakos served as the Deputy Minister of Coordination and Planning in the Konstantinos Karamanlis government from September 10, 1976 until October 21, 1977. He also held the portfolios of Minister for Trade from October 11, 1980 until October 21, 1981, and Minister of Labor from April 11, 1990 until October 13, 1993.

Aristides Kalantzakos died on February 26, 2017, at the age of 89.
