= Pratto =

Pratto is a surname. Notable people with the surname include:

- Felicia Pratto (born 1961), social psychologist
- Lucas Pratto (born 1988), Argentine footballer
- Nick Pratto (born 1998), American baseball player

== See also ==
- Pretto
- Prato
