= Sabrina Pretto =

Italian ballet dancer

Sabrina Sophie Pretto
- Born: Vicenza, Italy
- Education: Académie de Danse Classique Princesse Grace
- Occupation: Ballet dancer
- Years active: 2008–present
- Career
- Former groups: Les Ballets Trockadero de Monte Carlo; English National Ballet; Stadtheater Koblenz; Les Ballet Grandiva

Sabrina Sophie Pretto is an Italian ballet dancer. She was formerly a soloist with Les Ballets Trockadero de Monte Carlo ballet company. She was previously a company member with Stadtheater Koblenz and Les Ballets Grandiva, and danced as a guest artist with English National Ballet and Fondazione Arena of Verona. Pretto was a finalist in an international shoe design contest in 2000, organized by Sammauro Industria, and launched a dancewear line called Albypretty.

== Biography ==
Sabrina Pretto was born in Vicenza. She started training in classical ballet when she was fourteen, studying under Maria Berica Dalla Vecchia. In 2004, she moved to Monaco and enrolled at the Académie de Danse Classique Princesse Grace in Monte Carlo. She graduated in March 2008 from the academy. Upon graduating, she competed in the International Dance Competition in Spoleto and won the third place prize in classical ballet after dancing a variation from Bournonville's Napoli Pas de Six. Later that year, Pretto danced with the English National Ballet in their production of Strictly Gershwin and with the Fondazione Arena of Verona in the opera Aida.

In 2008, Pretto danced as a member of the company at Stadtheater Koblenz in Koblenz, Germany, for two seasons. In 2010, she joined Les Ballets Grandiva, a comedy ballet company, and went on tour with the company in Japan. She danced solo roles with Les Ballets Grandiva in Westward Symmetry, Gottschalk Pas de Trois, Pas de Quatre Noveau (Brian Norris), Paquita Pas de Trois, and Night Crawlers (Peter Anastos).

Pretto joined Les Ballets Trockadero de Monte Carlo in January 2011 and performed with the company under the stage names Nina Immobilashvili and Stanislas Kokitch. With the Trockaderos she has danced soloist roles including La Tarantella Pas de Deux, Paquita, Walpurgishnacht, Esmerelda, and Les Sylphides, as well as the Dying Swan..

Pretto also performed as a drag queen under the stage name Lolita Golightly.

Pretto is a fashion designer, and was a finalist in an international shoe design contest in 2000 that was organized by Sammauro Industria. She designs a line of dancewear called Albypretty.
